= Northern Theatre Command (India) =

Proposed Indian military integrated command

- Country: India
- Branch: Indian Armed Forces
- Type: Integrated tri-services command
- Headquarters: Lucknow, Uttar Pradesh

Northern Theatre Command is a proposed Integrated Theatre Command of the Indian Armed Forces. The command will be responsible for looking after the 3,488 kilometres of the Line of Actual Control (LAC), India's de facto border with China, starting from Ladakh to Kibithu, Arunachal Pradesh.

The Commander-in-Chief for the command will be an General from the Indian Army who will report to the Joint Chiefs of Staff Committee headed by the Chief of Defence Staff (CDS).

== History ==
The concept of Theatre Commands was first proposed by the Kargil Review Committee after the Kargil War, which promoted increasing jointness and integration. The plan for establishment of three different commands was first revealed in June 2023. The commands will be — one for managing border with China (Northern Theatre Command), another for managing the border with Pakistan (Western Theatre Command) and the third as the Maritime Theatre Command. There are currently 17 single service commands — 7 of the Army, 7 of the Air Force and 3 of the Navy. Each of these commands is located at a separate base.

In July 2024, the Defence Ministry identified Lucknow as the base for the Northern Theatre Command.

On 4 and 5 September 2024, the first Joint Commander's Conference (JCC) was held at Lucknow (current headquarters Army Central Command). The Chief of Defence Staff, General Anil Chauhan, inaugurated the first conference. The other attendees of the meeting included Defence Minister Rajnath Singh, Defence Secretary Giridhar Aramane, the 3 Service Chiefs, the 17 Commander-in-Chiefs of current Commands of the Services, the 2 Commander-in-Chiefs of current Tri-service Commands, DRDO chairman and other senior personalities of the Ministry of Defence. During the conference, Defence Minister received the "detailed modalities" for the creation of Integrated Theatre Commands prepared from the Armed Forces Services. The Armed Forces will rollout the timeline of the introduction of the Theatre Commands. Here, it was also revealed that the Commander-in-Chief of the Theatre Commands and Vice Chief of Defence Staff will be a four-star rank officer like the Chiefs of the Services (General, Air Chief Marshal and Admiral).

During September 2024, it was reported that the Commander will be appointed in rotation between an Army General and an Air Chief Marshal for a period of 18 months. The formal proposal for setting up three Integrated Theatre Commands (ITC) was submitted. This is expected to be approved by the Ministry of Defence soon. The concept of ITCs were developed under the leadership of the Chief of Defence Staff, General Anil Chauhan, for 20 months. He expects the military reform will take 2 years for full implementation.

As of September 2024, the formal proposal for setting up three Integrated Theatre Commands (ITC) was submitted. This is expected to be approved by the Ministry of Defence soon. The concept of ITCs were developed under the leadership of Chief of Defence Staff, General Anil Chauhan, for 20 months. He expects the military reform will take 2 years for full implementation.

As reported by the Hindustan Times on 2 February 2025, the three proposed theatre commands is expected to be established before the tenure of General Anil Chauhan ends as the Chief of Defence Staff on 30 May 2026. The next step is a note to the Cabinet Committee on Security, led by the Prime Minister for final approval. Meanwhile, the Defence Minister has cleared the concept in-principle, the National Security Advisor has examined the proposal and the three service chiefs and the CDS have signed the documents for their approvals. The Prime Minister has already given his support and explained the necessity to establish the structure during the Combined Commanders’ Conference in Kolkata in September 2025.

By April 2026, the broader leadership structure of the theatre commands was finalised by the Armed Forces. This will be later reviewed by the defence ministry and apex political leadership. The Northern Theatre Command will be headed by an Army General. Unlike the earlier rotation of command proposal, the theatre commander will be fixed. The deputy commanders will be from another service. The Northern front is expected to require more ground troops as per an assessment, hence, an Army officer would lead the theatre.

== See also ==
Integrated entities

- Defence Planning Committee, tri-services command at policy level with NSA as its chief
- Chief of Defence Staff (India), professional head of the Indian Armed Forces
- Integrated Defence Staff, tri-services command at strategic level composed of MoD, MEA and tri-services staff
- Indian Armed Forces Tri-Service Commands
  - Western Theatre Command (India)
  - Maritime Theatre Command
  - Andaman and Nicobar Command
  - Air Defence Command (India)
  - Strategic Forces Command, nuclear command of India
    - Indian Nuclear Command Authority, Strategic Forces Command
  - Defence Cyber Agency
  - Defence Space Agency
  - Special Operations Division

Assets

- List of Indian Air Force stations
- List of Indian Navy bases
- List of active Indian Navy ships
- India's overseas military bases

General concepts

- Joint warfare, general concept
- Credible minimum deterrence
- List of cyber warfare forces of other nations
