= Maritime Theatre Command =

Proposed Indian military integrated command

- Country: India
- Branch: Indian Armed Forces
- Type: Integrated tri-services command
- Role: Command and control of naval assets; Coastal defence
- Headquarters: Thiruvananthapuram, Kerala

Maritime Theatre Command (MTC), previously referred to as Peninsular Command, is a proposed integrated tri-services command of the Indian Armed Forces whose responsibilities may include the command and control of the entire Indian naval fleet and coastal defence operations. It is envisioned to include assets from all the branches of the Indian military.

The commander of the MTC will be a four-star Indian Navy officer (Admiral) who will report to the Joint Chiefs of Staff Committee headed by the Chief of Defence Staff (CDS).

== History ==
In 2001, the Andaman and Nicobar Command (ANC) was raised as a planned precursor to the MTC. According to India Today, this plan could not fructify due to the turf rivalries between the branches of the Indian military and a lack of will in India's political leadership. An Indian military plan published in 2017, the ‘Joint Forces Doctrine’, called for integrated commands like the MTC. The subsequent appointment of the CDS started the process of realising this doctrine. In 2020, a detailed study to implement the MTC was prepared by the Indian Navy.

The MTC will be a first of its kind since it will reduce the powers that the Indian naval chief will have over the naval fleet. In 2024, Thiruvananthapuram is identified as the command base for the Maritime Theatre Command.

As reported by the Hindustan Times on 2 February 2025, the three proposed theatre commands is expected to be established before the tenure of General Anil Chauhan ends as the Chief of Defence Staff on 30 May 2026. The next step is a note to the Cabinet Committee on Security, led by the Prime Minister for final approval. Meanwhile, the Defence Minister has cleared the concept in-principle, the National Security Advisor has examined the proposal and the three service chiefs and the CDS have signed the documents for their approvals. The Prime Minister has already given his support and explained the necessity to establish the structure during the Combined Commanders’ Conference in Kolkata in September 2025.

== Overview ==
The MTC may be headquartered at Thiruvananthapuram. The commander of the MTC may be an admiral from the Indian Navy. The MTC will incorporate the Andaman and Nicobar Command, the Western Naval Command, the Eastern Naval Command, and may be given the command and control of the Indian Coast Guard. The command may become operational by 2022.

Around two amphibious brigades under the Reorganised Amphibious Formation (RAMFOR) of the Indian Army, consisting of around 12,000 soldiers, will be placed under the MTC. These brigades are stationed at Port Blair and Thiruvananthapuram respectively. Moreover, Indian Air Force fighter aircraft including Su-30MKIs, Tejas and Jaguars will be placed under MTC's command.

== See also ==
Integrated entities

- Defence Planning Committee, tri-services command at policy level with NSA as its chief
- Chief of Defence Staff (India), professional head of the Indian Armed Forces
- Integrated Defence Staff, tri-services command at strategic level composed of MoD, MEA and tri-services staff
- Indian Armed Forces Tri-Service Commands
  - Northern Theatre Command (India)
  - Western Theatre Command (India)
  - Andaman and Nicobar Command
  - Air Defence Command (India)
  - Strategic Forces Command, nuclear command of India
    - Indian Nuclear Command Authority, Strategic Forces Command
  - Defence Cyber Agency
  - Defence Space Agency
  - Special Operations Division

Assets

- List of Indian Air Force stations
- List of Indian Navy bases
- List of active Indian Navy ships
- India's overseas military bases

General concepts

- Joint warfare, general concept
- Credible minimum deterrence
- List of cyber warfare forces of other nations
