= Air Defence Command (India) =

Previously planned Indian military integrated command

- Country: India
- Type: Integrated military command
- Role: Air defence
- Part of: Indian Armed Forces

Air Defence Command was a proposed unified tri-services command of the Indian Armed Forces. The command would be headed by a three-star Indian Air Force officer.

== History ==
After Bipin Rawat took office as the first Chief of Defence Staff in January 2020, he proposed the creation of an integrated military command that would coordinate air defence operations of the Indian military. Discussions were held in the Indian military establishment over this and it was decided that a proposal to create such command would be prepared by 30 June 2020. Work on creating the Air Defence Command was subsequently scheduled to start in 2021.

In June 2023, reports confirmed that the proposed Air Defence Command would not be established as the Indian Air Force stated a different command for air defence would be "counter-productive" because "air defence" and "offensive air" operations are inter-dependent. The air force also cited "that dividing limited air assets into separate commands would be unwise."

== Organisation ==
It was reported that a three-star officer from the Indian Air Force would head the proposed Air Defence Command. This command would have been responsible for air defence operations of the Indian military. It would have integrated all the relevant assets of three branches of the Indian Armed Forces under a single command authority.

== See also ==
Integrated entities

- Defence Planning Committee, tri-services command at policy level with NSA as its chief
- Chief of Defence Staff (India), professional head of the Indian Armed Forces
- Integrated Defence Staff, tri-services command at strategic level composed of MoD, MEA and tri-services staff
- Indian Armed Forces Tri-Service Commands
  - Northern Theatre Command (India)
  - Western Theatre Command (India)
  - Maritime Theatre Command
  - Andaman and Nicobar Command
  - Strategic Forces Command, nuclear command of India
    - Indian Nuclear Command Authority, Strategic Forces Command
  - Defence Cyber Agency
  - Defence Space Agency
  - Special Operations Division

Assets

- List of Indian Air Force stations
- List of Indian Navy bases
- List of active Indian Navy ships
- India's overseas military bases

General concepts

- Joint warfare, general concept
- Credible minimum deterrence
- List of cyber warfare forces of other nations
