= Defence Space Agency =

Indian Armed Forces Agency/Unit responsible for space warfare

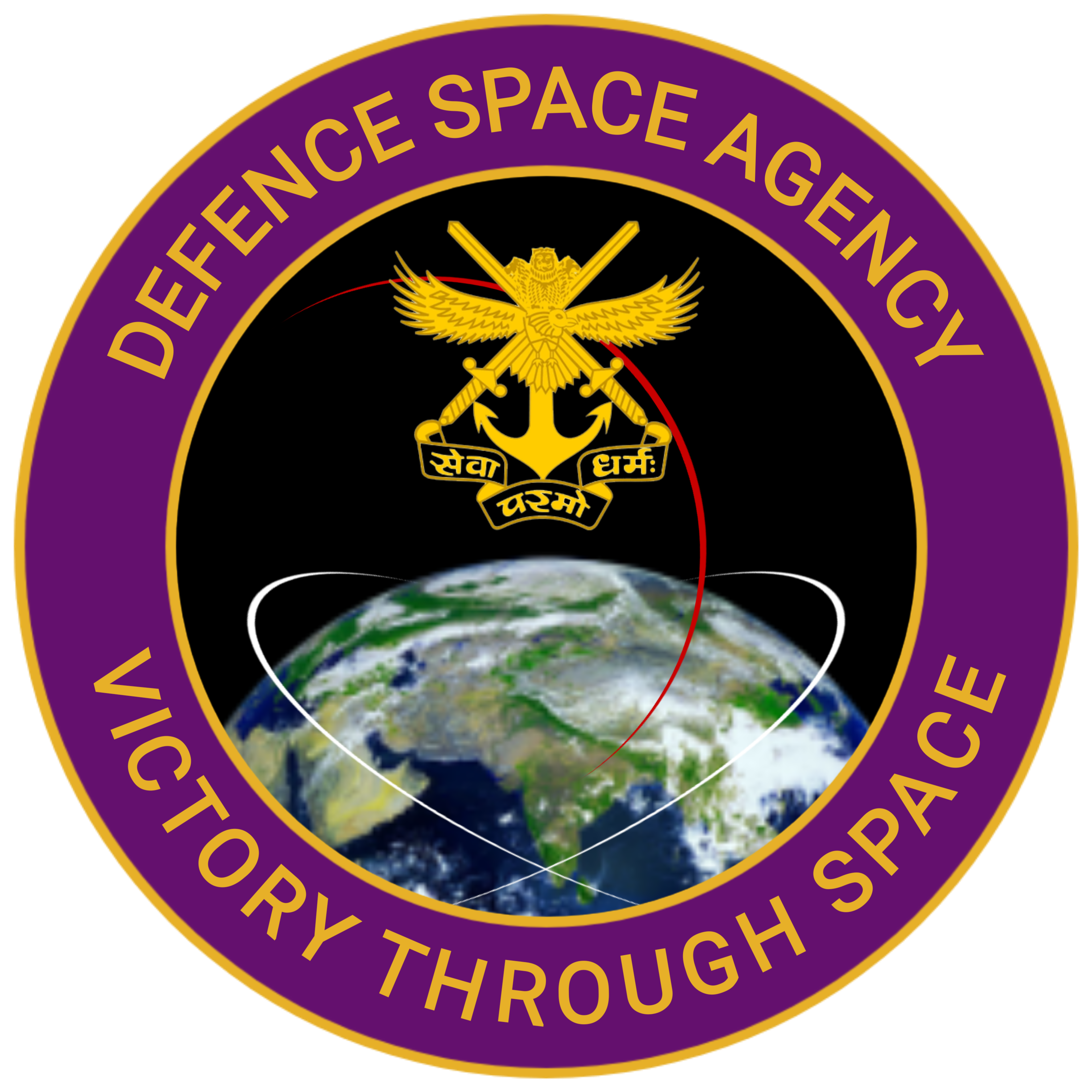
- Insignia of the Defence Space Agency
- Active: Established: 28 September 2018; 8 years ago; Operational: November 2019; 6 years ago
- Country: India
- Type: Integrated tri-services agency
- Role: Space warfare; Satellite Intelligence
- Part of: Integrated Defence Staff
- Headquarters: Bengaluru

Commanders
- Current commander: Air Vice Marshal Pavan Kumar, VM

The Defence Space Agency (DSA) is an integrated tri-services agency of the Indian Armed Forces headquartered in Bengaluru, Karnataka. The agency is tasked with operating the space warfare and satellite intelligence assets of India. The DSA draws personnel from all three branches of the Armed Forces.

The agency is expected to be converted into a full sized tri-service military command in the future.

== Background ==
=== History ===
The Naresh Chandra Task Force was set up in July 2011 by National Security Advisor Shivshankar Menon to review the recommendations of the Kargil Review Committee, assess the implementation progress and further suggest new reforms related to national security. The task force was led by Naresh Chandra, retired Indian Administrative Service officer, and comprised 13 other members, including Gopalaswami Parthasarathy, Air Chief Marshal Srinivasapuram Krishnaswamy (Retd), Admiral Arun Prakash (Retd), Lt Gen V. R. Raghavan (Retd), Anil Kakodkar, K C Verma and V K Duggal. The committee conducted the first holistic review of national security since the Kargil Review Committee and submitted its classified report to Prime Minister Manmohan Singh on 23 May 2012. Among its recommendations, the Task Force recommended the creation of a cyber command, an aerospace command and a special operations command. All three units were proposed to be tri-service commands. The DSA is a downsized implementation of this proposal.

The creation of the Defence Space Agency (DSA), the Defence Cyber Agency (DCA), and the Armed Forces Special Operations Division (AFSOD) was approved by Prime Minister Narendra Modi during the Combined Commanders' Conference at Jodhpur Air Force Station on 28 September 2018. The Defence Imagery Processing and Analysis Centre in Delhi and the Defence Satellite Control Centre in Bhopal were subsumed by the DSA.

On 7 April 2024, India’s Chief of Defence Staff (CDS), General Anil Chauhan, announced the forthcoming release of a dedicated military space doctrine within two to three months as well as the underway formulation of a national military space policy. The "Joint Military Space Doctrine" was released on 16 September 2025, the second day of Combined Commanders' Conference (CCC) 2025, at the headquarters Army Eastern Command, Fort William, Kolkata.

=== Organisation ===
DSA, headquartered in Bangalore and functioning under the Integrated Defence Staff with military personnel from all the three branches of the Indian Armed Forces deputed to the agency, became fully operational in 2019 with the aim to protect Indian interests in outer space, develop a space warfare strategy, and deal with potential space wars by leveraging the Signals Intelligence (SIGINT), Electronic Intelligence (ELINT), Communication Intelligence (COMINT), and space-based surveillance and tracking systems.

=== Defence Space Research Agency ===
The Defence Space Research Agency (DSRA) is the scientific organisation responsible for developing space-warfare systems and technologies for the Defence Space Agency. The DSRA was approved by the Government of India in June 2019. The DSRA is composed of scientists who undertake research and development in close coordination with the Integrated Defence Staff. Various types of Anti-satellite weapon systems are currently under development.

== Space Command ==
In 2023, Indian Air Force proposed to transition itself into Indian Air and Space Force (IASF) with an enhanced focus on space-based capabilities, including plans to operate over 100 small and large military satellites within next 7 to 8 years by expanding the role of DSA to a full-fledged Space Command.

In order to strengthen DSA and other related organizations by increasing manpower, ground-based infrastructure, and space-based assets to enhance India's space-centric warfare, space asset protection, and risk mitigation capabilities, the Department of Military Affairs presented a comprehensive transition plan to the key stakeholders, including the MoD, ISRO and DRDO, in December 2024. The Indian government had previously accepted DSA's SBS-III project, which calls for the launch of 52 military communication and surveillance satellites for the Indian military between 2025 and 2029, prior to the presentation of this transition plan.

== Anti-satellite programme ==
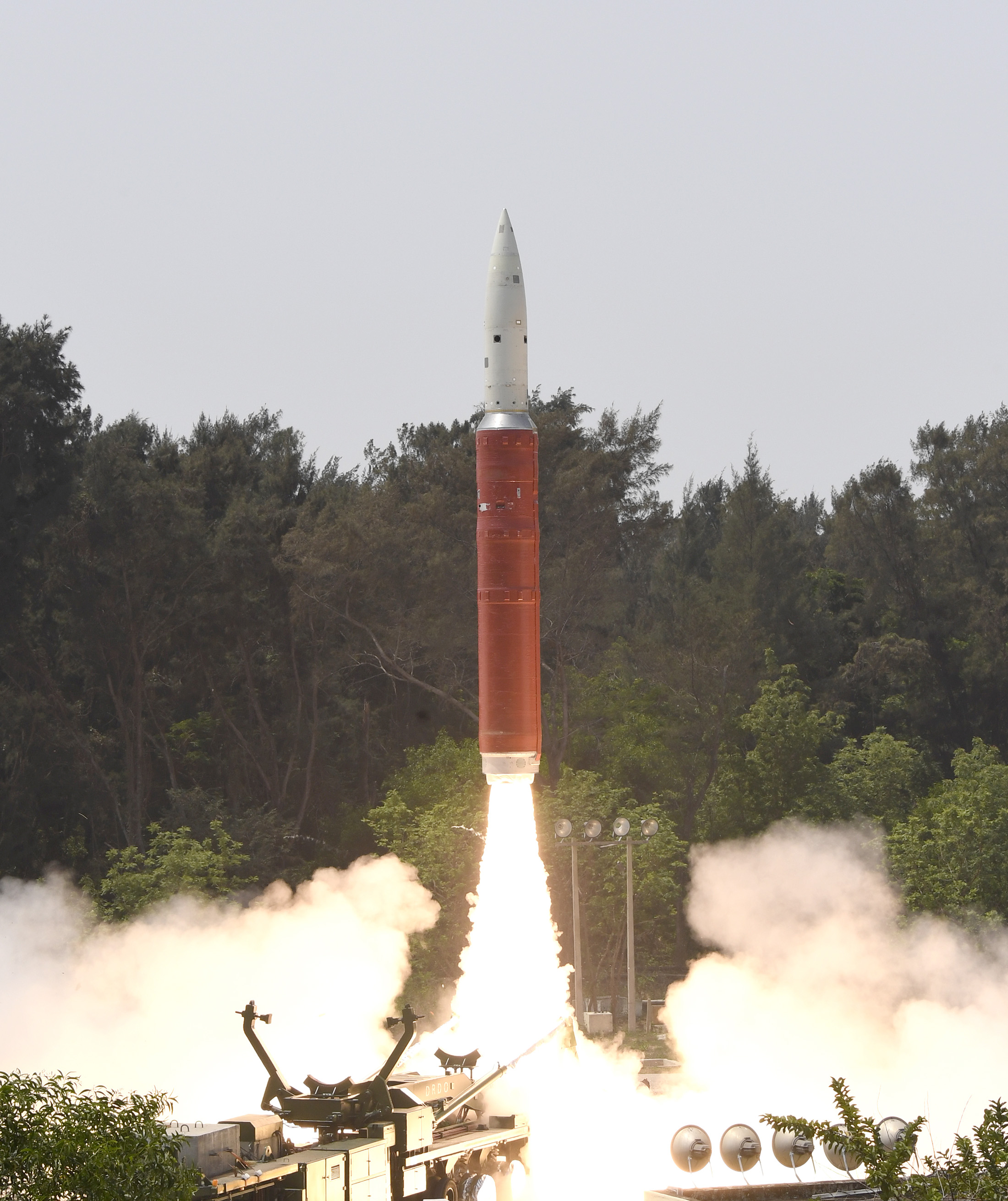
Indian ASAT missile, taking off during test in March 2019.

=== Origin: BMD (Ballistic Missile Defence) programme ===
The origin of the Indian ASAT programme can be traced back to its BMD program, which began in 1999 in response to threats posed by the Ballistic missiles of Pakistan and China. In 2006 and 2007, India tested its first exo atmospheric interceptor and has developed many interceptors since then. On 18 March 2008, DRDO Chief V. K. Saraswat stated that India possessed technology required for an ASAT missile, reiterating it in February 2010. India is known to have been developing an exo-atmospheric kill vehicle that can be integrated with the missile to engage satellites. In April 2012, Saraswat again said that India possessed the critical technologies for an ASAT weapon from radars and interceptors developed for Indian Ballistic Missile Defence Programme. India had begun work on its ASAT soon after the 2007 Chinese anti-satellite missile test.

=== ASAT: Anti-satellite weapons ===
India's Anti-satellite weapon (ASAT) program commenced in March 2019, months before the operationalisation of the Defence Space Agency, when India conducted an ASAT test aimed at demonstrating India's anti-satellite capability. In 2019, India was working on directed energy ASAT weapons, co-orbital ASAT weapons, lasers and electromagnetic pulse (EMP) based ASAT weapons. The ability to protect space assets from hostile electronic and physical attacks was also being developed by India.

== Military exercises ==
=== IndSpaceEx 2019 ===
India conducted its first simulated space warfare exercise on 25 and 26 July 2019, called IndSpaceEx. The exercise was conducted under the supervision of the Integrated Defence Staff. The exercise was aimed at obtaining an assessment of threats and the creation of a joint space warfare doctrine.

=== Antariksha Abhyan (2024-present) ===
The first edition of the exercise was conducted from 11 to 13 November 2024 by Headquarters Integrated Defence Staff. The exercise simulated various scenarios of war-game the growing threats from and to Space Based Assets and Services.

== Space assets ==
=== Space Based Surveillance (SBS) project ===
The Space Based Surveillance is a series of projects taken up by the Government of India to launch a constellation of satellites for earth observation roles. Additionally, the Indian Armed Forces also operates communications satellites of the GSAT-7 series of which GSAT-7 and GSAT-7A are active while GSAT-7B, GSAT-7C and GSAT-7R are planned for launch.

=== Mission DefSpace ===
Mission DefSpace is an initiative launched in October 2022 by the Defence Innovation Organisation (DIO) under the iDEX framework to promote indigenous development of dual-use technologies for India’s defence-space ecosystem with DSA. The programme was announced at DefExpo 2022 and introduced 75 “Defence Space Challenges” covering areas such as launch system, satellite system, communication and payload system, ground system and software system.

Through challenge-based funding and procurement-linked grants, Mission DefSpace enables start-ups, MSMEs, and research institutions to co-develop technologies that complement the operational needs of the Defence Space Agency and the Indian armed forces. Companies signing iDEX agreements include Sisir Radar (developing L- and P-band SAR payloads and an unfurlable antenna), Space Kidz India (CubeSat deployers), and Kepler Aerospace (CubeSat-class surveillance satellites), among others.

Mission DefSpace represents a major step toward self-reliance under the Atmanirbhar Bharat initiative, fostering public–private collaboration in space-based intelligence, surveillance, communications, and situational awareness for India’s defence establishment.

The CEO of the Defence Innovation Organization and the Additional Secretary of Defence Production signed the first iDEX contract for a micro-propulsion system for cubesats on May 15, 2023. A gas-based technology is being developed for this purpose by the Indian firm InspeCity. Once this technology is established, it can be merged with other satellites, such as the cubesat swarm under Mission DefSpace.

On July 25, 2023, Pixxel received funding from iDEX to produce small, multi-payload satellites for the IAF that might weigh up to 150 kg (330 lb). These satellites will be built for hyperspectral, infrared, electro-optical, and synthetic aperture radar applications. The funding is a component of the SPARKS project.

== List of Indian military satellites ==
As of 2024, India operates 9 military satellites. Of these, three strategic satellites including two communication satellites (GSAT-7 and GSAT-7A) are for dedicated military use, while the rest are dual-purpose satellites with military and civilian applications.

=== Operational ===
- RISAT-2B series
1. RISAT-2B: Launched on 22 May 2019 has replaced the retired RISAT-2. The primary requirement of the satellite is military surveillance along with secondary civilian purposes like disaster management, agriculture and forestry.
2. RISAT-2BR1: Launched on 11 December 2019 as a part of RISAT series. It can distinguish between objects which are 35 cm apart.
- Cartosat-2 series
1. CARTOSAT-2B carries a panchromatic (PAN) camera capable of taking black-and-white pictures in the visible region of electromagnetic spectrum which has a resolution of 80 centimetres. The highly agile CARTOSAT-2B can be steered up to 45 deg along as well as across the direction of its movement to facilitate imaging of any area more frequently and offers multiple spot scene imagery.
2. Cartosat-2C: Launched in June 2016, the satellite was used in reconnaissance purposes before and during 2016 Indian Line of Control strike.
3. Cartosat-2E: Launched on 23 June 2017, the Cartosat-2E satellite was designed to collect high-resolution (0.6 m×0.6 m), large scale imagery. The satellite provides an edge in warfare with clearer images. The satellite is also used for urban planning, infrastructure development and traffic management.
- EOS series
1. EOS-01 (previously RISAT-2BR2)
- GSAT-7 series
1. GSAT-7 was launched in 2013 for the exclusive use of the Indian Navy to monitor the Indian Ocean Region (IOR) with the satellite's 2,000 nautical mile ‘footprint’ and real-time input capabilities to Indian warships, submarines and maritime aircraft. To boost its network-centric operations, the IAF is also likely to get another satellite GSAT-7C within a few years.
2. GSAT-7R: Launched on 2 November 2025 to replace GSAT-7 for the Indian Navy.
3. GSAT-7A: Launched in December 2018 for the exclusive military use for the Indian Air Force. GSAT-7A allows IAF to interlink different ground radar stations, ground airbase, aircraft to aircraft Real-time Control System, AEW&C aircraft such as Beriev A-50-based Phalcon and DRDO Netra. The satellite enhances network-centric warfare capabilities of the Indian Air Force and its global operations. The satellite is also used by Indian Army's Aviation Corps for real-time control and communication of its aviation operations.
- HySIS series
1. HySIS, a dual use satellite, was also launched in November 2013, which is used by the navy. HySIS carries two payloads, the first in the Visible Near Infrared (VNIR) spectral range of 0.4 to 0.95 micrometres with 60 contiguous spectral bands and the second in the Shortwave Infrared Range (SWIR) spectral range of 0.85 to 2.4 micrometres with a 10 nanometre bandwidth and 256 contiguous spectral bands. The satellite will have a spatial resolution of 30 meters and a swath of 30 km from its 630 km sun-synchronous orbit.
- EMISAT series
1. EMISAT: Launched on 1 April 2019, is a reconnaissance satellite under DRDO's project Kautilya which will provide space-based electronic intelligence or ELINT, especially to improve the situational awareness of the Indian Armed Forces by providing information and location of enemy radars.

=== Planned ===
- Cartosat-3 series
1. Cartosat-3A (EOS-8): Planned to be launched on PSLV-XL. Will have a panchromatic resolution of 0.25 metres and a high quality resolution of 1 metre. To be launched in 2024.
2. Cartosat-3B: Planned to be launched on PSLV-XL. Will have a panchromatic resolution of 0.25 metres and a high quality resolution of 1 metre. To be launched in 2025.
- GSAT-7 series
1. GSAT-7B, planned to be first dedicated military satellite for the Indian Army. The approval was granted by Defence Acquisition Council (DAC) on 21 March 2023. The multiband military satellite, featuring integrated communication for network-centric operations, will be launched in 2–3 years. The contract for a 5-tonne satellite was signed with NewSpace India Limited (NSIL), worth ₹2,963 crore (equivalent to ₹32 billion or US$340 million in 2026) on 29 March 2023. The satellite would provide beyond line of sight communication to troops and formations as well as weapon and airborne platforms.
2. GSAT-7C, to replace GSAT-7A and serve the Indian Air Force exclusively. The satellite was approved was granted by Defence Acquisition Council (DAC) on 23 November 2021 at a cost of ₹2,236 crore (equivalent to ₹27 billion or US$280 million in 2026). It will be based on ISRO's I-2000 kg (I-2K) Bus. The ₹2,563 crore (US$270 million) contract to manufacture and launch the satellite was signed with NSIL on 15 October 2026.
- Additional 52 surveillance satellites under the Phase 3 of Space Based Surveillance (SBS) project to be launched between 2025–29.

=== Decommissioned ===
1. Technology Experiment Satellite or (TES) is an experimental satellite to demonstrate and validate, in orbit, technologies that could be used in the future satellites of Indian Space Research Organisation (ISRO). The Technology Experiment Satellite (TES) has a panchromatic camera capable of producing images of 1 meter resolution for remote sensing. The launch of TES made India the second country in the world after the United States that can commercially offer images with one meter resolution. It is used for remote sensing of civilian areas, mapping industry and geographical information services.
2. RISAT-2, or Radar Imaging Satellite 2 has a primary sensor, the synthetic aperture radar from Israel Aerospace Industries (IAI). RISAT-2 is India's first satellite with a synthetic aperture radar. It has a day-night, all-weather monitoring capability and has a resolution of one metre. Potential applications include tracking hostile ships at sea. Though the Indian Space Research Organisation sought to underplay the satellite's defence capabilities in its website and in its announcements, a majority of the media preferred to classify it as a spy satellite. ISRO claims that the satellite will enhance ISRO's capability for earth observation, especially during floods, cyclones, landslides and in disaster management in a more effective way.
3. CARTOSAT-2 carries a state-of-the-art panchromatic (PAN) camera that take black and white pictures of the Earth in the visible region of the electromagnetic spectrum. The swath covered by these high resolution PAN cameras is 9.6 km and their spatial resolution is 80 centimetres. The satellite can be steered up to 45 degrees along as well as across the track. CARTOSAT-2 is an advanced remote sensing satellite capable of providing scene-specific spot imagery. The data from the satellite will be used for detailed mapping and other cartographic applications at cadastral level, urban and rural infrastructure development and management, as well as applications in Land Information System (LIS) and Geographical Information System (GIS). Cartosat was decommissioned and the perigee lowered by controlled burns between March and Sep 2020 as debris mitigation activities. This will result in the orbit naturally decaying and re-entry within 10 years.
4. GSAT-6A is a dedicated satellite for army as a replacement for GSAT-6 which lost communication after its launch.
5. Microsat-R, a dedicated military satellite for the Indian Armed Forces, was launched on 24 January 2019. The 760 kg imaging satellite was launched using PSLV C-44 rocket.

== Re-orientation and optimization plan ==
The Ministry of Defense has been aiming for a three-layered constellation of multi-functional satellites since 2024. Satellites having the ability to uplink and downlink encrypted data are to be placed in low (up to 2,000 km), medium (between 2,000 km and 35,780 km), and geo-stationary (above 35,780 km) orbits. This program analyzes the lessons learned from the Russo-Ukrainian War of 2022 and allows the frequency bands to be licensed from private satellite agencies if necessary. The Defense Space Agency is in charge of the initiative.

== See also ==
- Space Force
- TSAT-1A
- Mission Sudarshan Chakra - proposed multi-layer defense system for India

Integrated entities

- Defence Planning Committee, tri-services command at policy level with NSA as its chief
- Chief of Defence Staff (India), professional head of the Indian Armed Forces
- Integrated Defence Staff, tri-services command at strategic level composed of MoD, MEA and tri-services staff
- Indian Armed Forces Tri-Service Commands
  - Northern Theatre Command (India)
  - Western Theatre Command (India)
  - Maritime Theatre Command
  - Air Defence Command (India)
  - Strategic Forces Command, nuclear command of India
    - Indian Nuclear Command Authority, Strategic Forces Command
  - Defence Cyber Agency
  - Special Operations Division

Assets

- List of Indian Air Force stations
- List of Indian Navy bases
- List of active Indian Navy ships
- India's overseas military bases

Other nations

- Space Forces (Russia) - Russian equivalent command
- Space Operations Command (US) - U.S. equivalent command

General concepts

- Joint warfare, general concept
- Credible minimum deterrence
- List of cyber warfare forces of other nations
