= Integrated Theatre Command (India) =

Service of the Indian Armed Forces

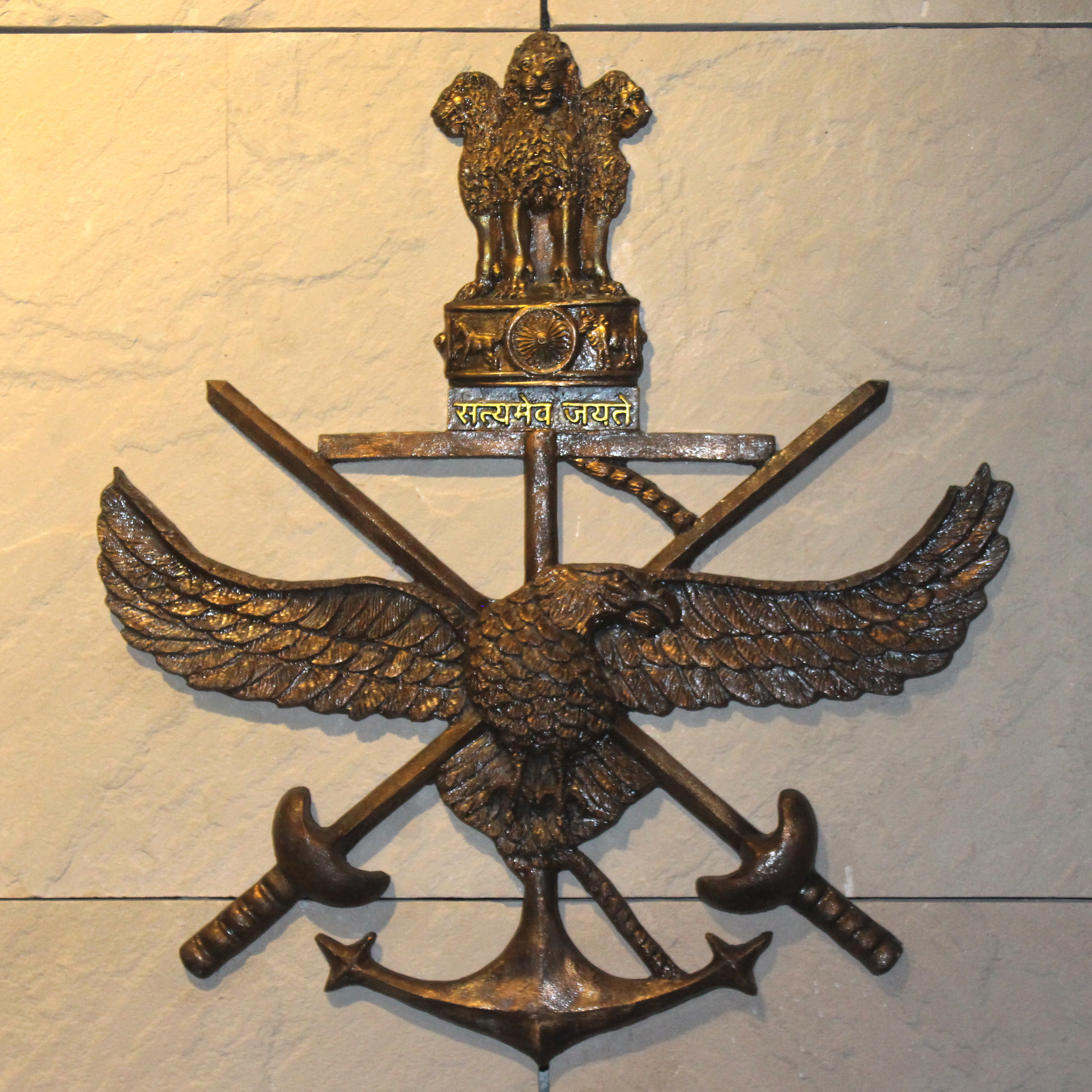
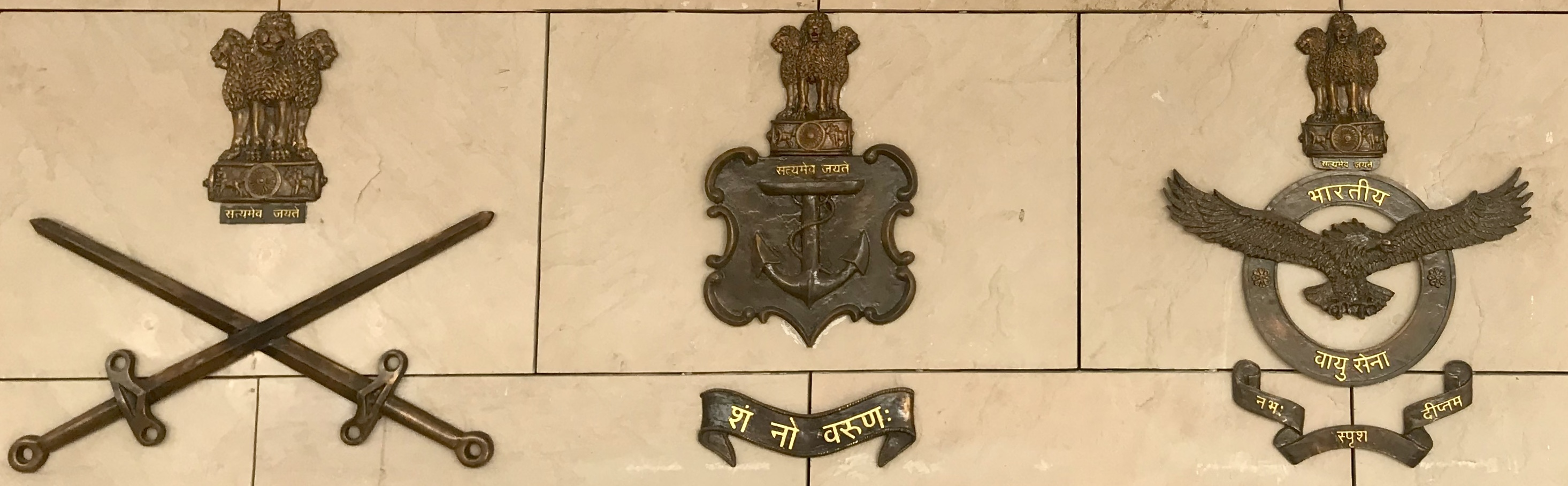
The emblem of the Indian Armed Forces (top), signifying the synergy of the three services of the Indian military. The tri-services logo (top) is a combination of the logos of the three services (bottom).

Integrated Theatre Commands of the Indian Armed Forces are varying degrees of synergy and cross-service cooperation between the military branches of the Armed Forces. In 1947, after Independence, a joint educational framework was set up, starting with the first (Note: "A decision was taken by the Government of India on 22 Sep 1945, that an academy to train officers for the three-armed force branches together, should be started. No such institution existed anywhere else in the world at that time. Government approval was accorded on 17 February 1948.") tri-service academy in the world, the National Defence Academy, and over the years this joint educational framework has been expanded to bring officers from the different services together at different stages of their careers.

Jointness and integration are achieved through tri–service organisations such as the Integrated Defence Staff. The creation of the post of the Chief of Defence Staff (CDS) in January 2020 was seen as a major push for the indigenous joint warfare and theaterisation process of the Indian Armed Forces. So too were efforts to enhance civil–military cooperation, including the creation of the Department of Military Affairs. These are considered key to orienting India's defence toward a more joint approach.

The recommendations of the Kargil Review Committee promoted increasing jointness and integration. Subsequent committees such as the Shekatkar Committee in 2016 included the creation of three integrated theatres commands. In February 2020, CDS Bipin Rawat said two to five theatre commands may be set up. The completion of the creation of theatre commands, both integrated and joint commands, will take several years. Indian Air Force opposed the formation of unified theatre commands citing limitation of resources.

India currently has service–a specific commands system. However, joint and integrated commands, also known as unified commands; and further divided into theatre or functional commands, have been set up and more are proposed. The only fully functional theatre command is the Andaman and Nicobar Command set up in 2001, while the Strategic Forces Command, set up in 2003, is an integrated functional command or specified combatant command. Recently constructed integrated functional commands under the Integrated Defence Staff include the Defence Cyber Agency, Defence Space Agency and the Special Operations Division.

== History ==
One of the earliest forms of jointness was the integration of infantry and cavalry. In the United States, during the Siege of Vicksburg in 1863, joint operations were seen in the actions of General Ulysses S. Grant and Admiral David D. Porter, who went on to leverage the combined power of the army and navy. The United Kingdom was the first country to have a Chiefs of Staff Committee in 1923. In the Second World War, General Douglas MacArthur and General Dwight D. Eisenhower were put in roles in which they commanded vast tri-service military operations. Despite the victory in the war, major structural flaws were observed, resulting in the creation of the Chairman, Joint Chiefs of Staff as the principal military adviser in the United States. In the United Kingdom, by the 1960s, the three military headquarters were integrated into the Ministry of Defence, and the post of Chief of Defence Staff was created as the principal military adviser. Over the years in both the United States and the United Kingdom changes towards greater integration have been seen, for example, the passage of the Goldwater–Nichols Act in 1986. France, Germany and Australia have also shifted to a more integrated defence management system. In Russia the creation of strategic commands was laid down in 2010 and soon after China followed with the 2015 People's Republic of China military reform and the creation of five theatre commands.

=== Joint Services Institutions in the Indian Armed Forces ===
Tri Service military exercise Bharat Shakti 2024 in Pokhran

Following Independence, India set up a Joint Services Wing, commissioned in 1949, to train cadets before they would go on for further training in their respective service institutions. By 1954, the Joint Services Wing would go on to become the National Defence Academy, the first tri-service military academy in the world. By 1950, the Defence Services Staff College was also converted to a fully integrated institution. In 1960 and 1970, the National Defence College and the College of Defence Management were commissioned, respectively. This joint educational framework that brought officers together at different stages of their careers has been beneficial in increasing inter-service camaraderie.

In his book, "My Years with the IAF", Retd. Air Chief Marshal P. C. Lal wrote that "The Bangladesh war demonstrated that the three Services working closely together were strong and decisive in their actions. Inter-Services cooperation was indeed the most important lesson of that war." However, Air Marshal Vinod Patney pointed out that one of India's first experiences with jointness did not work out so well. He writes that India had attempted to try out a Theatre Commander during the initial stages of the Indian intervention in the Sri Lankan Civil War with the deployment of the Indian Peace Keeping Force. However, after helicopters were sent on missions without proper advice, resulting in avoidable loss of life and machinery, air and naval assets were once again positioned under respective air and naval commanders. Under this structure, the operations continued till the end of the peacekeeping operations in 1990.

Following the Kargil War in 1999, the Kargil Review Committee was set up to review where India went wrong during the limited war with Pakistan and suggest changes to the security apparatus accordingly. Subsequently, a Group of Ministers was formed and, in turn, four task forces. Among the numerous recommendations suggested were "integration of the services both with each other and with the Ministry of Defence, the creation of a chief of defence staff and joint operational commands". The Manohar Parrikar-led Ministry of Defence appointed a committee of experts, chaired by Retd.Lt General DB Shekatkar, submitted its report in December 2016. Among the recommendations of the Shekatkar Committee was the creation of three integrated theatre commands.

== About ==
The Department of Military Affairs under the Chief of Defence Staff has the mandate for the "Facilitation of restructuring of Military Commands for optimal utilisation of resources by bringing about jointness in operations, including through establishment of joint/theatre commands". India's Chief of Defence Staff Bipin Rawat has said that India will find its way of constructing its unified commands. Integrated Theatre Commands are allocated specific geographical theatres and can operate independently. In June 2020, Lt General (Dr) Prakash Menon wrote that "The main aim of Theatre Commands is to facilitate integrated planning and coordinated application".

=== Terminology ===
According to the 2017 Joint Doctrine publication of the Headquarters Integrated Defence Staff:

Jointness: Jointness implies or denotes possessing an optimised capability to engage in Joint Warfighting. [...] Joint operations as well as single-Service operations are subsets of the larger whole of 'conceptual Jointness'. Cooperative centralised planning enables the appropriate concentration of forces [...]. With Jointness, a high level of cross-domain synergy is attained. Integration: Integration in contemporary military matters is about the integration of 'processes' across all operational domains of land, air, maritime, cyberspace, and aerospace, towards optimisation of costs and enhancing readiness. Integration is embodied across all functions: Operations, Intelligence, Technology Management, Perspective Plans, Logistics, and Human Resources Development (HRD).[...] Beyond the Armed Forces, it also requires collaboration with the Diplomatic, Economic, and Information instruments of the National Power, at all levels – strategic, operational, and tactical.

According to the former Chief of India's Army Staff Deepak Kapoor, who recommended theatre commands as early as the 1980s, "integration is a step ahead of jointness in ensuring a synergised approach to operations". While in a joint command, the parent service remains part of the decision-making process, in integrated commands, resources from the three services are already placed under one commander. In the case of an integrated command, the commander must be able to fully understand the workings of all the services under his command.

== Implementation ==
India, as of May 2025, has two fully functional unified commands — the Andaman and Nicobar Command (ANC) set up in 2001 and the Strategic Forces Command (SFC) set up in 2003. While the ANC is an integrated theatre command, the SFC is an integrated functional command (or specified combatant command). There are 17 single-service commands — 7 of the Army, 7 of the Air Force, and 3 of the Navy. Each of these commands is located at a separate base.

=== 2020 ===
The Air Defence Command was expected to be the first command to be undertaken as of 2020. Integrated commands set up as specialised service providers have also been formed: Defence Cyber Agency, Defence Space Agency, and the Armed Forces Special Operations Division that are agencies of Integrated Defence Staff. The Defence Cyber Agency could go on to form the Information Warfare Command. Other proposed commands include the Logistics Command and the Training & Doctrinal Command. The Integrated Defence Staff and the Defence Planning Committee are an integral part of the theaterisation process. In February, the then Chief of Defence Staff (CDS) General Bipin Rawat said two to five theatre commands are being looked into.

=== 2023 ===
In June, reports confirmed that Air Defence Command will not be operationalised due to Indian Air Force stating a different Command for Air Defence shall be "counter-productive" because "air defence" and "offensive air" operations are inter-dependent. Air Force also cited "that dividing limited air assets into separate [sic] commands would be unwise." Hence, as of 2023, three different commands will be set up, one for managing the border with China, another one for managing the border with Pakistan, and the third as the Maritime Theatre Command. Each of the commands will be headed by three-star officers from the Indian Armed Forces.

=== 2024 ===
In July, the Defence Ministry identified Jaipur as the base for the Western Theatre Command; Lucknow as the base for the Northern Theatre Command and the base for Maritime Theatre Command at Thiruvananthapuram. The maintenance facilities for common platforms used by more than one branch like AK-203 rifle, HAL Dhruv, AH-64E Apache, HAL Prachand, Dassault Rafale, etc. are also planned to be brought under an Integrated Maintenance Command.

On 4 and 5 September, the first Joint Commander's Conference (JCC) was held at Lucknow (current headquarters Army Central Command). The CDS General Anil Chauhan inaugurated the first conference. The other attendees of the meeting included Defence Minister Rajnath Singh, Defence Secretary Giridhar Aramane, the 3 Service Chiefs, the 17 Commanders-in-Chief of current Commands of the Services, the 2 Commanders-in-Chief of current Tri-service Commands, DRDO chairman and other senior personalities of the Ministry of Defence. During the conference, the defence minister received the "detailed modalities" for the creation of Integrated Theatre Commands prepared by the Armed Forces Services. The Armed Forces would roll out the timeline of the introduction of the Theatre Commands. The plans to set up four Joint Logistics Nodes (JLN) at Leh, Siliguri, Sulur, and Prayagraj were to be proposed in addition to the already-established ones at Mumbai, Guwahati, and Port Blair. It was also noted that Commanders-in-Chief of the three Theatre Commands and the Vice Chief of Defence Staff are proposed to be four-star rank officers equivalent to the Chiefs of the Services (General, Air Chief Marshal and Admiral). The theatre commanders will handle operational security, while the role of the service chiefs will be to strengthen other administrative functions of the Armed Forces. An Army and Air Force officer would head the Western and Northern Command for 18 months in rotation, while a Navy officer would head the Maritime Command. There has been many developments and discussions in the last 2 years for setting up the Theatre Commands.

During the JCC meeting, a formal proposal for setting up three Integrated Theatre Commands (ITC) was submitted. This is expected to be approved by the Ministry of Defence soon. The transition to the ‘one border, one force’ concept from a service-specific command shall be the largest military reform in India since independence. The concept of ITCs was developed under the leadership of CDS Anil Chauhan for 20 months. He expects the military reform will take 2 years for full implementation. This plan also includes setting up cyber, space, and underwater sub-commands. On 23 October, Army Chief General Upendra Dwivedi announced during a press conference that the formal proposal for the Theatre Commands are at a "mature" stage and is ready to be sent to the Government for decision-making.

=== January–June 2025 ===
On 1 January, it was reported that the Defence Ministry has recognised 2025 as the "Year of Reforms" and the primary objective would be the roll-out of the theatre commands, development of domains like cyber security and space, and emerging technologies like artificial intelligence, machine learning, hypersonic, and robotics. Steps would be taken to streamline the process of defence acquisition procedures and make them more time-sensitive. From the same day, changes were also observed in the appointment of Aide-de-Camp (personal staff officers) of the Chiefs of Staffs. Earlier, the ADC officers were selected by the Chiefs from the units of their own branch or service. However, from 2025, the same would be selected from the sister services of the respective Chiefs. None of the high-ranking officials were against the theaterisation concept during the meetings since September 2022. By August, the Navy Chief had an ADC from the Army while the Air Chief had a naval Flight Lieutenant-ranked ADC officer.

As for air defence, the Akastheer system of the Indian Army is being integrated with the Integrated Air Command and Control System (IACCS) of the Indian Air Force to increase the efficiency of the Armed Forces to defend the Indian airspace. This brings the radars of the Army through Akashteer and the Air Force radars and civilian radars through the IACCS under the Joint Air Defence Centre (JADC) level. Post integration, IAF will be in charge of the JADC. As of January, integration for one site is complete, while that for the other sites is underway. In the book "Ready, Relevant and Resurgent: A Blueprint for the Transformation of India’s Military" authoured by CDS Anil Chauhan which was released on 22 May, he described that following the Theaterisation the Command Chiefs will be tasked for Force Application or operational aspects while the Service Chiefs will be tasked for Force Generation or to "Raise, Train and Sustain" the branches of the Armed Forces.

On 24 June, the Defence Minister Rajnath Singh authorised the CDS and Secretary, Department of Military Affairs, to issue Joint Instructions and Joint Orders applicable which would be applicable for to the Army, Air Force, as well as Navy. This is against the earlier norm of issuing separate instructions and orders for each different service. The first Joint Order, titled "Approval, Promulgation and Numbering of Joint Instructions and Joint Orders," was issued the same day.

=== August–December 2025 ===
On 7 August, the CDS Anil Chauhan and the Secretary of the Department of Military Affairs released the "Joint Doctrine for Cyberspace Operations" and "Joint Doctrine for Amphibious Operations" during the Chiefs of Staff Committee meeting in New Delhi. While the former aims to defend national cyberspace interests through integrated offensive-defensive capabilities, real-time intelligence, and joint cyber force development, the latter is meant to enable coordinated maritime-air-land operations for power projection ashore through interoperability, rapid response, and joint force application. Multiple other doctrines and premiers, including the ones for Military Space Operations, Special Forces Operations, Airborne & Heliborne Operations, Integrated Logistics, and Multi Domain Operations, are being drafted.

On 27 August, the CDS Anil Chauhan released the "Joint Doctrine for Special Forces Operations" and "Joint Doctrine for Airborne & Heliborne Operations" during the Ran Samwad tri-service seminar at the Army War College, Mhow. This doctrine was formulated under the leadership of the Doctrine Directorate, Headquarters of the Integrated Defence Staff, in coordination with the three Services. The doctrine is meant to document the principles, concepts, and frameworks for conducting Special Forces missions and Airborne Operations, respectively.

During this first-of-its-kind seminar, certain differences among CDS Anil Chauhan, CNS Admiral Dinesh K Tripathi and CAS Air Chief Marshal A P Singh were reportedly evident from their speeches. While the latter suggested not to rush to establish Integrated Theatre Commands in the Indian Armed Forces while following foreign models, the Navy Chief embraced the proposal and expressed the force's commitment to integrate its command and control, communications, and combat capabilities with the other services to achieve theaterisation. The CDS, meanwhile, said any "dissonance" within the Armed Forces on the creation of the theatre commands would be solved in the "best interest of the nation". The Air Force Chief, however, supported an idea of setting up a centralised "joint planning and coordination centre" in the National Capital of Delhi under the Chief of Staff Committee to enhance jointness and synergy in the Armed Forces.

The Combined Commanders' Conference (CCC) 2025 of the Indian Army took place in Fort William, Kolkata, West Bengal (current headquarters Army Eastern Command). between 15 and 17 September. The conference was inaugurated by the Prime Minister of India, Narendra Modi. The theme of the conference was Year of Reforms - Transforming for the Future, with the focus being on reforms, transformation, and change, and operational preparedness, and emphasising the Indian Armed Forces' necessary institutional reforms, deeper integration, technological modernisation, and sustained multi-domain operational readiness. The CCC is the Armed Forces' biennial apex-level forum. The 16th edition will see the participation of the nation's top civil and military leaders including the Defence Minister, National Security Advisor, Minister of State for Defence, Chief of Defence Staff, Defence Secretary as well as officers from the three Services and the Integrated Defence Staff. The last CCC was hosted in Bhopal, Madhya Pradesh in 2023. The Prime Minister would also be reportedly briefed of the planned higher level reforms in the Armed Forces especially the creation of three Integrated Theatre Commands.

The conference began with demonstrations by the Joint Operations Command Centre and a live Air Defence demonstration, exhibiting the modern capabilities in air surveillance, missile defence, and counter-drone operations. The CDS also summarised the progress on the major reforms undertaken over the last two years. The Prime Minister also gave his speech on the first day, followed by the Defence Minister. The second day focused on information warfare and was followed by a session organised by Headquarters Integrated Defence Staff. The "Joint Military Space Doctrine" was also released the same day. The third day was reserved for the requirement of jointness and integration across the Services as well as fostering interoperability, streamlining decision-making, and reforming institutional structures for space, cyber, information, and special operations domains. Two announcements were made on the third day itself. One of them was the establishment of a tri-service Education Corps through the merger of the education institutions of the three Services, while the other was the setting up creation of three Joint Military Stations.

The Joint Military Stations will be established in Thiruvananthapuram, Visakhapatnam, and Gandhinagar in the first phase. The Armed Forces also aims to standardise equipment, supply chains for logistics and procurement across the services, in addition to joint training at all levels, more cross-postings, exposure to other services, and even greater social interaction among personnel to enhance jointness and integration within the military. The expansion of the tri-service communication network is also planned. Multiple changes are being incorporated to increase the jointness. These include reworking of vacancies and syllabi of certain courses and phasing out or harmonising some service-specific customs or traditions.

As reported in November, the defence ministry has fast-tracked the process to establish theatre commands. The commands will be structured with the assistance of the Chief of Defence Staff. Preliminary work to enhance the integrity of the three services has been completed. This includes increasing the frequency of meetings among the services and the Department of Military Affairs (DMA). The proposal to activate the formations at the cabinet level is to be completed soon. Thereafter, the same would be presented to the Defence Minister and the National Security Advisor.

=== 2026 ===
As reported by the Hindustan Times on 2 February 2025, the three proposed theatre commands is expected to be established before the tenure of General Anil Chauhan ends as the Chief of Defence Staff on 30 May 2026. The next step is a note to the Cabinet Committee on Security (CCS), led by the Prime Minister for final approval. Meanwhile, the Defence Minister has cleared the concept in-principle, the National Security Advisor has examined the proposal and the three service chiefs and the CDS have signed the documents for their approvals. The Prime Minister has already given his support and explained the necessity to establish the structure during the Combined Commanders’ Conference in Kolkata in September 2025.

The second edition of Ran Samwad tri-service seminar is scheduled on 9 and 10 April at Air Force Training Command, Bengaluru. By then, the broader leadership structure of the theatre commands was finalised by the Armed Forces. This will be later reviewed by the defence ministry and apex political leadership. There would be eight four star officers — the Chief of Defence Staff (CDS), the Vice Chief of the Defence Staff (V-CDS), three Theatre Commanders and three Service Chiefs. While the CDS will head the Joint Chiefs of Staff Committee and focus in his role as the Secretary, Department of Military Affairs, the V-CDS will oversee day-to-day operational matters. Further, the Northern and Western Theatre Commands will have a four star rank commander-in-chief from the Indian Army (General) and Air Force (Air Chief Marshal), respectively. The division of Air Force assets, however, is yet to be announced with possibilities remaining where the air assets would be controlled centrally. Several table top exercises are being conducted simulating varying scenarios and their results. Force multiplier assets like AEW&CS, aerial refueling tanker aircraft and electronic-warfare aircraft are likely to be controlled centrally and deployed as per mission requirements. Even the fighter fleet could be divided to theatre command control and centralised control.

On 4 May, CDS Anil Chauhan said that the military will have an operational Joint Operations Control Centre (JOCC) at the Delhi Cantonment by the end of the month. The JOCC will integrated the operational planning and battlefield execution across the three services. Such a joint planning and coordination centre was proposed by the Air Force chief in Ran Samwad 2025. Another deep underground JOCC is also planned at an alternate location. By April, 90% of the groundwork on the ITC framework was completed and the proposal had been moved to the defence ministry for vetting before being placed before higher political authorities including the CCS. The defence forces will make their presentations before the defence minister and other ministry officials on 7–8 May. The ultimate implementation of the theatre commands will require a larger legal framework compared to the Inter-Services Organisations (Command, Control & Discipline) Act, 2023. The CDS also noted the establishment of a Defence Geospatial Agency (DGA), tri-service Drone Force and a Cognitive Warfare Action Force under the Defence Forces Vision 2047 roadmap. The Defence Space Agency (DSA) will also see an expansion under the roadmap.

On 13 July, Hindustan Times reported that the newly-appointed CDS, N. S. Raja Subramani, will make a detailed presentation tom the defence minister and all stakeholders on the current roadmap of the process of theaterisation. The then CDS, Anil Chauhan, has already submitted his final draft proposal on the subject before demitting the office. Once the approval is received from the minister, the theatre command plan will be forwarded to the Prime Minister-led CCS as a note for the final nod.

== Foundational legislation ==
=== Inter-Services Organisations (Command, Control & Discipline) Act, 2023 ===
During the Monsoon Session of 2023, Parliament of India passed the Inter-Services Organisations (Command, Control & Discipline) Act, 2023. The Bill received the President's assent on August 15, 2023. As notified through Gazette Notification No SRO 72 dated December 27, 2024, this is:

An Act to empower the Commander-in-Chief or the Officer-in-Command of Inter-services Organisations in respect of service personnel who are subject to the Air Force Act, 1950, the Army Act, 1950 and the Navy Act, 1957, who are serving under or attached to his command, for the maintenance of discipline and proper discharge of their duties, and for matters connected therewith or incidental thereto

According to an official press release, "The Act empowers Commanders-in-Chief and Officers-in-Command of ISOs to exercise control over Service personnel, serving under them, for effective maintenance of discipline and administration, without disturbing the unique service conditions of each Service. With the notification, the Act will empower the Heads of ISOs and pave the way for expeditious disposal of cases, avoid multiple proceedings, and will be a step towards greater integration & jointness among the Armed Forces personnel." This confirmed the progress in the matters of establishment of theatre commands under the Indian Armed Forces. The Act was enforced into effect from 10 May 2024 as a replacement for the provisions contained in the specific service acts—Army Act 1950, Navy Act 1957 and Air Force Act 1950—in the ISOs.

=== Inter-Services Organisations (Command, Control & Discipline) Rules, 2025 ===
The Inter-Services Organisations (Command, Control & Discipline) Rules, 2025 are a set of subordinate legislation enacted under Section 11 of the ISO Act. These rules provide the detailed administrative, operational, and procedural framework for implementing the provisions of the Act, particularly in the context of India's evolving joint military structures, including Joint Services Commands. The implementation of the Rules from 27 May 2025 fully operationalises the ISO Act.

- Inter-services unit: A military unit, ship, or establishment comprising personnel from two or more branches of the Indian Armed Forces (Army, Navy, and Air Force), commanded by an officer from any of these services and authorised under Section 8 of the Act.
- Joint Services Command: A higher-level military command consisting of personnel from multiple branches of the Indian Armed Forces, led by a Commander-in-Chief holding the rank of Lieutenant General, Air Marshal, or Vice Admiral.

== List of Integrated Theatre Commands ==
Name	Insignia	Established	Status	HQ	Commander			Ref
Name	Insignia	Established	Status	HQ	Image	Incumbent	Branch	Ref
Theatre commands
Andaman and Nicobar Command		2001	Operational	Sri Vijaya Puram		Vice Admiral Vineet McCarty	IN	
Northern Theatre Command		2026 (expected)	Proposed	Lucknow			IA	
Western Theatre Command		2026 (expected)	Proposed	Jaipur			IAF	
Maritime Theatre Command		2026 (expected)	Proposed	Thiruvananthapuram			IN	
Functional commands
Strategic Forces Command		2003	Operational			Lieutenant General Dinesh Singh Rana	IA	
Logistics Command		—N/a	Proposed					
Training & Doctrinal Command		—N/a	Proposed					
Functional agencies or units under the Integrated Defence Staff (Note: Expected to evolve into full-fledged commands.)
Defence Cyber Agency		2019	Operational			Rear Admiral Sanjay Sachdeva	IN	
Defence Space Agency		2019	Operational			Air Vice Marshal Pavan Kumar	IAF	
Special Operations Division		2019	Operational			Major General M. S. Bains	IA	
Defence Geospatial Agency		—N/a	Proposed					

=== Previously Planned Commands ===
- Air Defence Command — The plan to raise the functional command was dropped due to "limited assets" as cited by the Air Force.

== Defence Communication Network ==
To enable the tri-services to exchange information, intelligence, and situational awareness, the Department of Telecommunications, in collaboration with the Ministry of Defence, established an indigenous, sophisticated, secure Defence Communication Network (DCN) covering all Indian territories. A 57,000-kilometre fibre-optic cable has been installed by BSNL as of April 2020. Satellite links or microwave radios will be used to connect remote military bases. Along 100 kilometres of the international boundary, a Defence Interest Zone and exclusive defence band were established, where spectrum was set aside exclusively for the Armed Forces' usage. It was officially launched on 30 June 2016 by Minister of Defence Manohar Parrikar.

The DCN is the first tri-services network specifically designed to improve jointness, even though the Indian Army, Indian Air Force, and Indian Navy each have their own command, communication, and intelligence networks The DCN project worth ₹600 crore, is designed and developed by HCLTech. Initially, it provided 111 military sites with high-quality phone, video, and data services. It has been installed on a variety of military vehicles and can function on both satellite and terrestrial communication channels. HCL Infosystems began nationwide implementation on 30 June 2018. DCN functions during military and rescue operations. The Strategic Forces Command, the Integrated Defense Staff, the Indian Army, the Indian Air Force, and the Indian Navy are all connected by DCN. It is the single largest satellite network in the Indian Armed Forces. Along with all the commands of the three services, DCN integrates the entire nation, from Ladakh to the northeast to the island territories of Lakshwadeep.

The Union Cabinet authorised ₹24,664 crore (US$2.6 billion) for the fibre-optic cable network in May 2018. On 19 April 2020, Rediff reported that Larsen & Toubro had been assigned to oversee the communications network, also known as the Armed Forces Network (AFN), which links 414 military sites. There will be an additional 60,000 kilometres of fibre-optic cable installed. The network will be managed, supported, and run by L&T's developed Unified Network Management System (UNMS) within 18 months starting 14 April 2020 at the cost ₹2,700 crore (US$280 million). Network assets will be visible and monitored in real-time by UNMS's Next Generation Operations Support System. Call routing and connection, alternative routing, system repair, and data transmission, video, and audio functionality are all included. With the help of data centre infrastructure, which handles networking, routing, switching, server and storage provision, and military network firewall, it will oversee the addition and removal of services. L&T will set up a Security Operations Centre to handle logs, alerts, archives, and security threats.

== Integrated Rocket Force ==
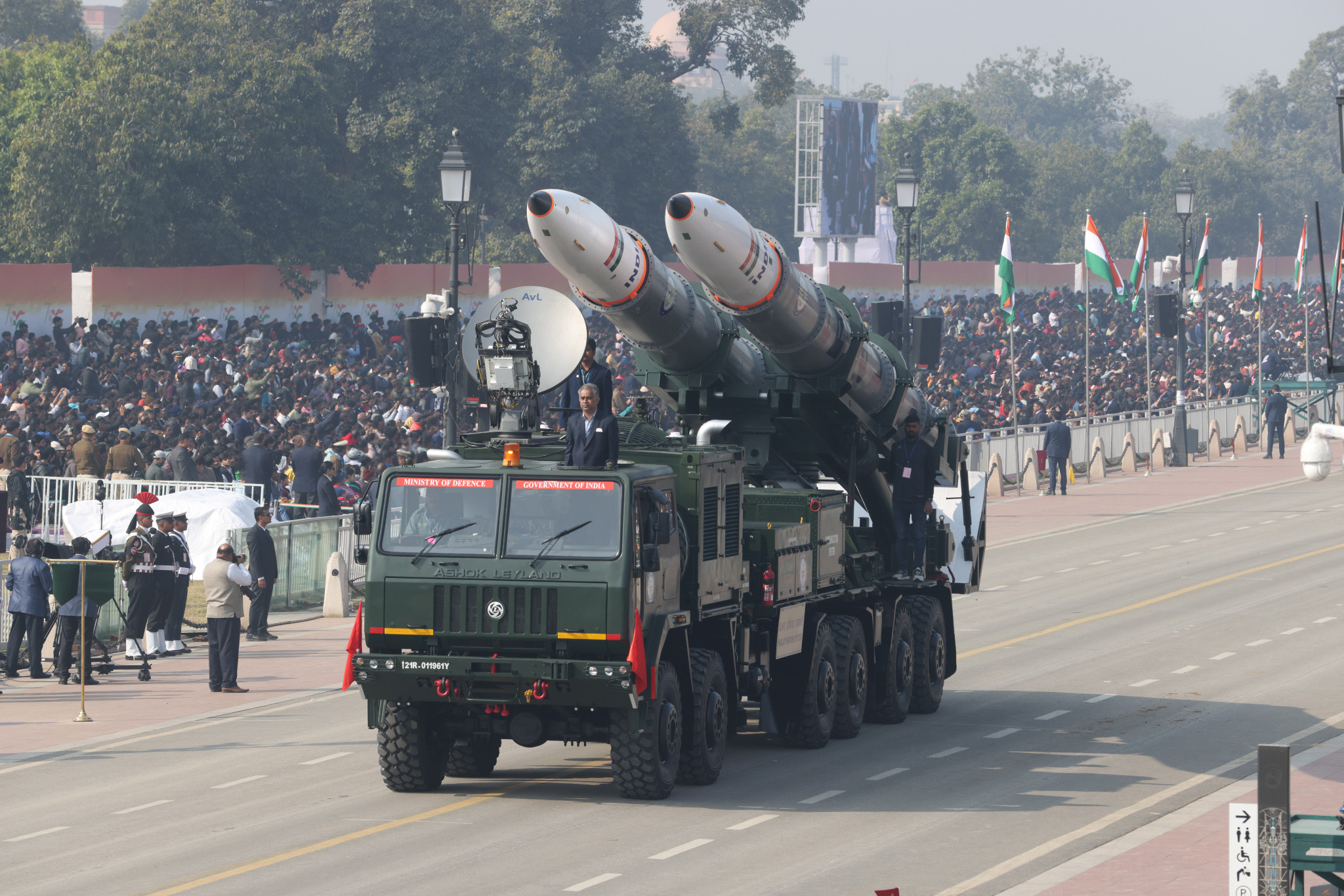
Pralay missile

== Critical commentary ==
Retd. Air Chief Marshal S Krishnaswamy, the former Chief of Air Staff, wrote an article in The Indian Express titled, "Why theatre commands is an unnecessary idea" where he conveys that the idea of dividing India into "Theatre Command(s) may seemingly have some operational advantage" but "the permanency of dividing our territory into Operational Theatres as a defence measure seems preposterous. And to state that such a division is required to defend our country more effectively sounds alarming." Air Marshal Narayan Menon writes that Integrated Theatre Commands work for United States, Russia and China is because militarily they are countries which are self-sufficient while "India is in a completely different and subordinate class" in terms of military expenditure and "shortages in personnel, equipment and firepower" in all three of the services. Maj Gen (Retd) SB Asthana notes that the idea of Integrated Theatre Commands in India "seems to be driven more by economic considerations and less by operational inadequacies".

Group Captain Anant Bewoor (Retd.) opposes theaterisation for India, stating that countries with Integrated Theatre Commands, such as the United States, Russia, and China, have different international expeditionary goals as compared to India. India neither has the forces for Integrated Commands, nor the geographical and strategic need, nor the international expeditionary ambitions. He also points out that Pakistan, which does not have Integrated Theatre Commands, causes so much damage to India, nevertheless. Air Commodore Jasjit Singh (Retd.) also commented that theatre commands are generally used for foreign operations, and India does not need such a force. Air Commodore Singh also argued that the specialisation that the current framework allows may be lost with unified commands and that if the services couldn't work together now, under the theatre process, the situation may be worse.

== See also ==
- Exercise TROPEX
- Technical Support Division
- Civilian control of the military
- Civil–military relations

=== Comparable military structures ===
- Unified combatant command
- Theater command
