= Defence Cyber Agency =

Command of the Indian Armed Forces

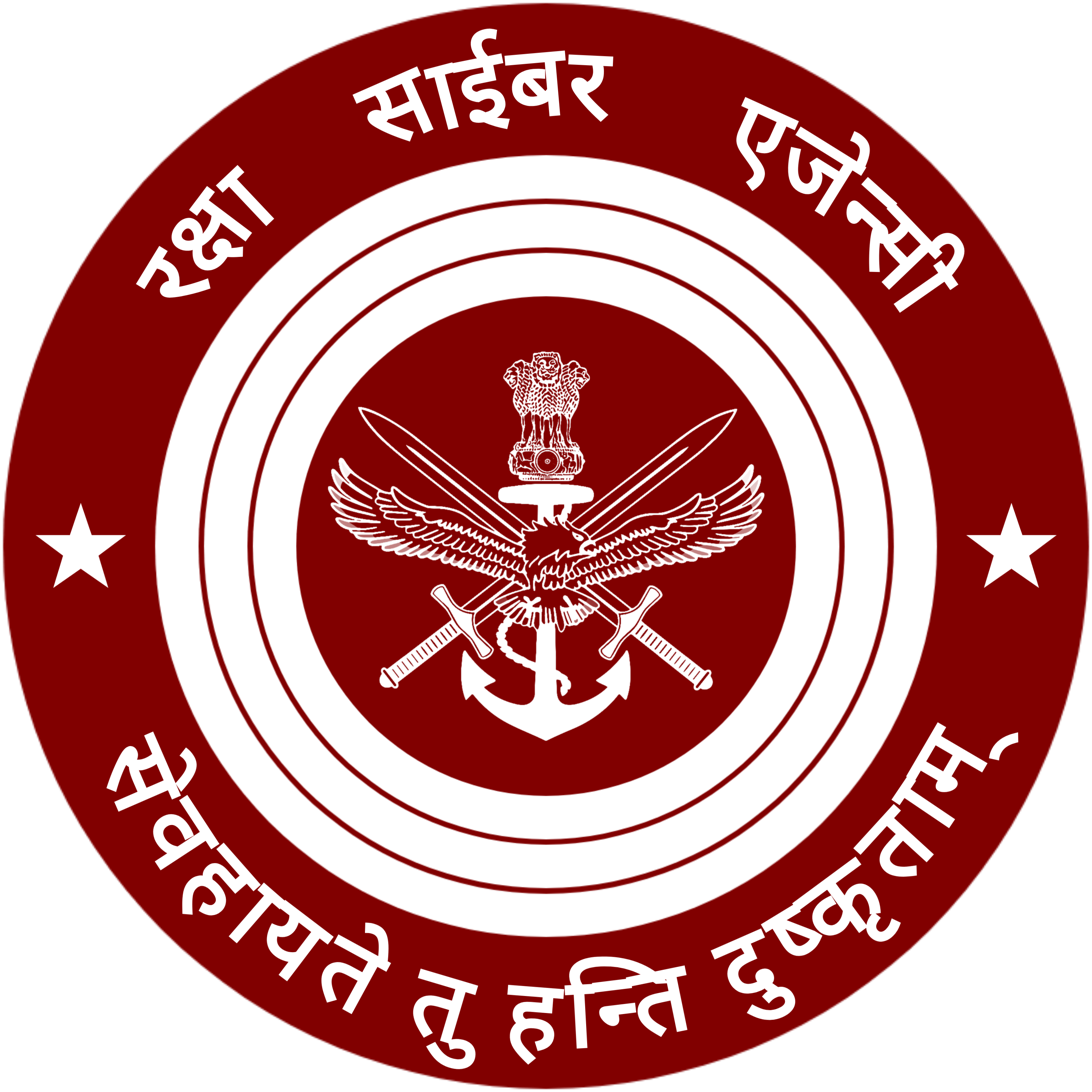
- Insignia of the Defence Cyber Agency
- Active: Established: 28 September 2018; Activated: November 2019; Operational: August 2021
- Country: India
- Type: Integrated tri-services agency
- Role: Cyber Warfare
- Part of: Integrated Defence Staff (IDS)
- Headquarters: New Delhi, India
- Nickname: DCyA
- Motto: sevahāyate tu hanti duṣkṛtām

Commanders
- Director General: Rear Admiral Sanjay Sachdeva, NM

The Defence Cyber Agency (DCyA) is an integrated tri-services agency of the Indian Armed Forces. Headquartered in New Delhi, the agency is tasked with handling cyber security threats. The DCyA draws personnel from all three branches of the Armed Forces. The head of the DCyA is an officer of two-star rank, and reports to the Chief of Defence Staff (CDS) through the Integrated Defence Staff (IDS).

Indian Navy Rear Admiral Mohit Gupta was appointed in May 2019 as the first head of the DCyA. The DCyA was expected to be operational by November 2019. As of 2021, DCyA was fully operational with Army, Air Force, and Navy establishing their respective Cyber Emergency Response Teams (CERT).

== History ==
The Naresh Chandra Task Force was set up in July 2011 by National Security Advisor Shivshankar Menon to review the recommendations of the Kargil Review Committee, assess the implementation progress, and suggest new reforms related to national security. The task force was led by Naresh Chandra, a retired Indian Administrative Service officer, and comprised 13 other members, including Gopalaswami Parthasarathy, Air Chief Marshal Srinivasapuram Krishnaswamy (retired), Admiral Arun Prakash (retired), Lieutenant General V. R. Raghavan (retired), Anil Kakodkar, K. C. Verma, and V. K. Duggal. The committee conducted the first holistic review of national security since the Kargil Review Committee and submitted its classified report to Prime Minister Manmohan Singh on 23 May 2012. Among its recommendations, the Task Force recommended the creation of a cyber command (DCyA), an aerospace command and a special operations command. All three units were proposed to be tri-service commands in order to bring the various special forces units of the military under a unified command and control structure.

The creation of the Defence Cyber Agency (DCyA), the Defence Space Agency (DSA), and the Armed Forces Special Operations Division (AFSOD) was approved by Prime Minister Narendra Modi during the Combined Commanders' Conference at Jodhpur Air Force Station on 28 September 2018. The existing Defence Information Assurance and Research Agency was upgraded to form the new Defence Cyber Agency.

On 7 August 2025, the Chief of Defence Staff General Anil Chauhan and Secretary of Department of Military Affairs released the "Joint Doctrine for Cyberspace Operations" and "Joint Doctrine for Amphibious Operations" during the Chiefs of Staff Committee meeting in New Delhi. While the former aims to defend national cyberspace interests through integrated offensive-defensive capabilities, real-time intelligence and joint cyber force development, the latter is meant to enable coordinated maritime-air-land operations for power projection ashore through interoperability, rapid response and joint force application.

== Area of responsibility ==
The Week reported that the DCyA would have the capability to hack into networks, mount surveillance operations, lay honeypots, recover deleted data from hard drives and cellphones, break into encrypted communication channels, and perform other complex objectives. According to Lieutenant General Deependra Singh Hooda, the DCyA would have the responsibility of framing a long-term policy for the security of military networks, including eliminating the use of foreign hardware and software in the Indian Armed Forces, and preparing a cyberwarfare doctrine.

== See also ==
- List of cyber warfare forces of other nations

Integrated entities

- Defence Planning Committee, tri-services command at policy level with NSA as its chief
- Chief of Defence Staff (India), professional head of the Indian Armed Forces
- Integrated Defence Staff, tri-services command at strategic level composed of MoD, MEA and tri-services staff
- Indian Armed Forces Tri-Service Commands
  - Northern Theatre Command (India)
  - Western Theatre Command (India)
  - Maritime Theatre Command
  - Air Defence Command (India)
  - Strategic Forces Command, nuclear command of India
    - Indian Nuclear Command Authority, Strategic Forces Command
  - Defence Space Agency
  - Special Operations Division

Assets

- List of Indian Air Force stations
- List of Indian Navy bases
- List of active Indian Navy ships
- India's overseas military bases

General concepts

- Joint warfare, general concept
- Credible minimum deterrence
- List of cyber warfare forces of other nations
