= Armed Forces Special Operations Division =

Joint formation of the Indian Armed Forces responsible for special operations

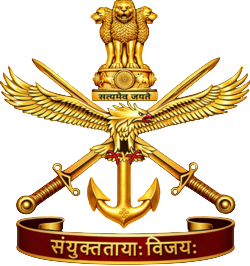
- Logo of The Integrated Defence Staff
- Active: 28 September 2018 (established); November 2019 – present (operational)
- Country: India
- Allegiance: India
- Type: Integrated tri-services division
- Role: Special Operations Forces
- Size: 3,000 (estimate)
- Part of: Integrated Defence Staff
- Headquarters: Bengaluru

Commanders
- Current commander: Major General M. S. Bains

The Armed Forces Special Operations Division (AFSOD) is an integrated tri-services division of the Indian Armed Forces. The division is tasked to carry out special operations. The AFSOD draws personnel from all three special warfare branches of the Indian Armed Forces.

Indian Army Major General A. K. Dhingra, who is a military veteran from the Para SF, was appointed in May 2019 as the first head of the AFSOD. The division is expected to be converted into a full sized tri-service command in the future.

== History ==
=== Origins ===
The Naresh Chandra Task Force was set up in July 2011 by National Security Advisor Shivshankar Menon to review the recommendations of the Kargil Review Committee, assess the implementation progress, and further suggest new reforms related to national security. The task force was led by Naresh Chandra, retired Indian Administrative Service officer, and comprised 13 other members, including Gopalaswami Parthasarathy, Air Chief Marshal Srinivasapuram Krishnaswamy (Retd), Admiral Arun Prakash (Retd), Lieutenant General V. R. Raghavan (Retd), Anil Kakodkar, K. C. Verma and V. K. Duggal. The committee conducted the first holistic review of national security since the Kargil Review Committee and submitted its classified report to Prime Minister Manmohan Singh on 23 May 2012. Among its recommendations, the Task Force recommended the creation of a cyber command, an aerospace command and a special operations command. All three units were proposed to be tri-service commands to bring the various special forces units of the military under a unified command and control structure. The AFSOD is a downsized implementation of this proposal.

The creation of the AFSOD was approved by Prime Minister Narendra Modi during the Combined Commanders' Conference at Jodhpur Air Force Station on 28 September 2018. On 27 August 2025, the Chief of Defence Staff General Anil Chauhan released the "Joint Doctrine for Special Forces Operations" and "Joint Doctrine for Airborne & Heliborne Operations" during the Ran Samwad tri-service seminar at the Army War College, Mhow. This doctrine was formulated under the leadership of the Doctrine Directorate, Headquarters of the Integrated Defence Staff, in coordination with the three Services. The doctrine is meant to document the principles, concepts, and frameworks for conducting Special Forces missions and Airborne Operations, respectively.

=== Initial exercises ===
- The division concluded its first exercise, code-named 'Smelling Field', on 28 September 2019. The exercise was carried out in the district of Kutch in the state of Gujarat. The exercise was meant to help in ironing out, and subsequently addressing the challenges faced by the division.
- The second exercise was, code named 'DANX-2019', was subsequently held in the Andaman and Nicobar Islands. The exercise aims for the mobilization and field manoeuvre to validate defensive plans of ANC HQ ensuring territorial integrity of A&N Island

== Organisation ==
The AFSOD will function under the Integrated Defence Staff. Units from all the three special forces of the Indian Armed Forces will be stationed in the division. The division is expected to be fully operational by November 2019.

=== Role ===
The AFSOD is expected to serve as the main organisation responsible for carrying out special operations within and outside India. They are expected to carry out missions such as targeting high-value installations and degrading the war-fighting capabilities of hostile nations. The rationale behind the creation of this division is to pool the special abilities of each of the special forces units of the Armed Forces and enable them to operate together. The division will also help in reducing operational costs, since it will enable each of the special warfare units to utilise common equipment.

=== Components ===
The division is expected to have around 3,000 soldiers, though the exact number remains classified. The main components of the AFSOD are:

- Para (Special Forces): The Para SF is the special warfare branch of the Indian Army. They will form a major portion of the AFSOD with ten battalions of 620 operators each.
- MARCOS: The MARCOS is the special warfare branch of the Indian Navy. It is specialised in operations in a maritime environment, although it can operate in all environments. The force is estimated to include 1,400 personnel.
- Garud Commando Force: The Garud Commando Force is the special warfare branch of the Indian Air Force. They are tasked to undertake missions in support of air operations. They are deployed at important military bases and assets and conduct search and rescue missions during wartime. As of 2025, Garud reportedly includes 27 'flights' with 1,600 personnel.
- Other systems: The division will be given operational control of transport aircraft, specialised weapon systems, and surveillance equipment.

== Deployments ==
=== Jammu and Kashmir ===
On 24 November 2019, the AFSOD was operationally deployed for the first time in Jammu and Kashmir to conduct counter-insurgency operations in the region.

== See also ==
Integrated entities

- Defence Planning Committee, tri-services command at the policy level with NSA as its chief
- Chief of Defence Staff (India), professional head of the Indian Armed Forces
- Integrated Defence Staff, tri-services command at the strategic level composed of the MoD, MEA, and tri-services staff
- Indian Armed Forces Tri-Service Commands
  - Northern Theatre Command (India)
  - Western Theatre Command (India)
  - Maritime Theatre Command
  - Air Defence Command (India)
  - Strategic Forces Command, nuclear command of India
    - Indian Nuclear Command Authority, Strategic Forces Command
  - Defence Cyber Agency
  - Defence Space Agency
  - Defence Intelligence Agency (India)
  - Armed Forces Special Operations Division

Assets

- List of Indian Air Force stations
- List of Indian Navy bases
- List of active Indian Navy ships
- India's overseas military bases

Other nations

- Special Operations Forces Command (KSSO) - Russian equivalent command
- Special Operations Command - U.S. equivalent command

General concepts

- Joint warfare, general concept
- Minimum Credible Deterrence
- List of cyber warfare forces of other nations
