= Western Command =

Western Command can refer to one of the following:

- Western Command (Australia)
- Western Theatre Command (India), Indian Armed Forces
- Western Command (India), Indian Army
- Western Air Command (India), Indian Air Force
- Western Naval Command, Indian Navy
- South Western Command (India), Indian Army
- Western Command (Philippines)
- Western Command (United Kingdom)
- Western Command (United States)
- Western Hemisphere Command (United States)
