= D. B. Shekatkar =

Lieutenant General D. B. Shekatkar PVSM, AVSM, VSM

Personal details
- Education: Indian Military Academy
- Awards: Param Vishisht Seva; Ati Vishisht Seva; Vishisht Seva

Military service
- Allegiance: India
- Branch: Indian Army
- Service years: 30 June 1963 – 2002
- Unit: Maratha Light Infantry

Lieutenant General D. B. Shekatkar PVSM, AVSM, VSM is a retired Indian army officer. He was commissioned on 30 June 1963 into the Maratha Light Infantry. He is currently the chancellor of Sikkim University.

== Role in Kashmir ==
General Shekatkar was instrumental in the surrender of 1267 terrorists in Jammu and Kashmir who had been trained in Afghanistan and Pakistan. Post-surrender, the militants returned to normal life.

The largest number of surrenders in a day also took place under Shekatkar's command in 1995 when he was a major general — 95 militants surrendered in Aragam and Malanam in Baramulla district on 1 October which was the largest surrender of militants in the valley till then. Majority of the militants were from Hizbul Mujaheddin.

Shekatkar briefly served as Commandant of Infantry School starting in 2002.
