= Defence Planning Committee =

Senior decision making body of GoI in defence matters

Committee overview
- Formed: 19 April 2018; 8 years ago
- Jurisdiction: India
- Minister responsible: Rajnath Singh, Minister of Defence
- Deputy Minister responsible: Sanjay Seth, Minister of State for Defence
- Committee executive: Ajit Doval, IPS, National Security Adviser and ex-officio chairperson
- Parent department: Ministry of Defence, Government of India

The Defence Planning Committee is a senior decision-making organisation created on 19 April 2018 by the Government of India.

== History ==
The Defence Planning Committee was notified by the Ministry of Defence (MoD) in April 2018, the National Security Adviser (NSA) was appointed as the chairperson of the committee, with the chairperson, Foreign Secretary, Defence Secretary, Chief of Defence Staff, Chief of the Army Staff, Chief of the Air Staff, Chief of the Naval Staff, and expenditure secretaries of Ministry of Finance being its members and the chief of the Integrated Defence Staff (CIDS) being its member-secretary, the NSA was also given the mandate to co-opt members as they see fit. The Integrated Defence Staff headquarters at Kashmir House, New Delhi was to serve as the committee's secretariat.

NSA Ajit Doval chaired the committee's first meeting on 3 May 2018, which was attended by the three chiefs of staff, and defence, foreign and expenditure secretaries. The first meeting discussed the topics under mandate of DPC.

== Mandate ==
The mandate of DPC is manifold; the committee is empowered to "analyse and evaluate all relevant inputs relating to defence planning", which consists of—amongst others—"national defence and security priorities, foreign policy imperatives, operational directives and associated requirements, relevant strategic and security-related doctrines, defence acquisition and infrastructure development plans, including the 15-year Long-Term Integrated Perspective Plan (LTIPP), defence technology and development of the Indian defence industry and global technological advancement".

The committee is also vested with the power of preparing different drafts, including—but not limited to—drafts on: "national security strategy, strategic defence review and doctrines; international defence engagement strategy; roadmap to build defence manufacturing eco-system; and prioritised capability development plans for the armed forces over different time-frames in consonance with the overall priorities, strategies and likely resource flows."

The DPC answers to—and submits its reports to—the Raksha Mantri (Minister of Defence), currently Rajnath Singh.

According to the notification issued by Indian Government the DPC will have several mandates namely to

1. Prepare a draft National Security Strategy.
2. Develop a capability development plan.
3. Work on defence diplomacy issues.
4. Improving defence manufacturing ecosystem in India.

== Organisation ==
Four sub-committees on: policy and strategy, plans and capability development, defence diplomacy and defence manufacturing ecosystem come under the DPC; the terms of reference and membership of the sub-committees are finalised separately. Specific issues are managed by the committee through its sub-committees.

DPC is chaired by the National Security Adviser, with the service chiefs, defence, expenditure and foreign secretaries being its members and the IDS chief being its member-secretary. The Integrated Defence Staff headquarters in New Delhi serves as the secretariat for the committee. The DPC submit its reports to the Raksha Mantri (Minister of Defence).

=== Members ===
Members of the Defence Planning Committee
Position	Incumbent	Portrait	Ex-officio status
National Security Adviser	Ajit Doval, IPS (retd.)		Chairperson
Chief of Defence Staff and Permanent Chairman, Chiefs of Staff Committee	General N. S. Raja Subramani		Member
Chief of the Army Staff	General Dhiraj Seth		Member
Chief of the Air Staff	Air Chief Marshal Ashutosh Dixit		Member
Chief of the Naval Staff	Admiral Krishna Swaminathan		Member
Defence Secretary	Rajesh Kumar Singh, IAS		Member
Foreign Secretary	Vikram Misri, IFS		Member
Expenditure Secretary	Vumlunmang Vualnam, IAS		Member
Chief of Integrated Defence Staff	Air Marshal Tejinder Singh		Member Secretary

== Reception ==
Former Chief of the Air Staff, Air Chief Marshal Srinivasapuram Krishnaswamy—who was a part of the Naresh Chandra task-force—praised the move, calling it "an outstanding move"; but, criticised the government's decision to not include the Defence Production Secretary and Defence Research and Development Organisation (DRDO) chairperson in the committee, dubbing them "key players" in the government's flagship Make in India initiative.

Amit Cowshish, a former Financial Adviser (Acquisition) in the Ministry of Defence, criticised the committee's "wide mandate", calling it an obstacle from "swift reform". Cowshish also criticised the timing of DPC's creation, calling it a step taken "four years too late", further adding that the creation of the committee called "into question the relevance of the existing long-term, five-year and annual plans of the armed forces".

Mohinder Puri, a former deputy chief of the army, praised the government's decision, saying, "on the face of it, the DPC looks good, as it takes the overall view of national and international security". A The Week column questioned the decision of naming the NSA as DPC's chairperson, arguing that NSA is already overworked as it is being the PM's special representative on border issues with China and chief of the executive council of Nuclear Command Authority.

== See also ==
Integrated entities

- Integrated Defence Staff, tri-services command at strategic level composed of MoD, MEA and tri-services staff
- Defence Cyber Agency, tri-services command
- Armed Forces Special Operations Division, tri-services command at operational level
- Defence Space Agency, draws staff from all 3 services of Indian Armed Forces
- Strategic Forces Command, nuclear command of India
  - Indian Nuclear Command Authority, Strategic Forces Command
  - Special Forces of India, tri-services, RAW and internal Security each has own units
- Andaman and Nicobar Command, first operational tri-services command

Assets

- List of Indian Air Force stations
- List of Indian Navy bases
- List of active Indian Navy ships
- India's overseas military bases

Other nations

- Special Operations Forces Command (KSSO) - Russian equivalent command
- Joint Special Operations Command (JSOC) - U.S. equivalent command

General concepts

- Joint warfare, general concept
- Minimum Credible Deterrence
- List of cyber warfare forces of other nations
