= Integrated Defence Staff =

Tri-service Defence organisation of the Indian Armed Forces

- Insignia of Integrated Defence Staff

- Flag of Integrated Defence Staff.

Agency overview
- Formed: 1 October 2001; 25 years ago
- Motto: Victory Through Jointness
- Minister responsible: Rajnath Singh, Minister of Defence
- Deputy Minister responsible: Sanjay Seth, Minister of State, Ministry of Defence
- Agency executives: General N. S. Raja Subramani, Chief of Defence Staff; Air Marshal Tejinder Singh, Chief of Integrated Defence Staff
- Parent department: Ministry of Defence, Government of India
- Child agencies: Defence Space Agency; Special Operations Division; Defence Cyber Agency
- Website: ids.nic.in

The Integrated Defence Staff (IDS) is an organisation responsible for fostering coordination and enabling prioritisation across the different branches of the Indian Armed Forces. It is composed of representatives from the Indian Army, Indian Navy, Indian Air Force, Ministry of External Affairs, Defence Research and Development Organisation (DRDO), Ministry of Defence and Ministry of Finance. The IDS is headed by Chief of Integrated Defence Staff along with Deputy Chiefs of Integrated Defence Staff.

On December 24, 2019, the Cabinet Committee on Security (CCS) established the post of Chief of Defence Staff, a four-star general, a tri-service Chief, that shall lead the defence forces as well as play the role of head of the Department of Military Affairs. The body advises and assists the Chief of Defence Staff.

== Role and Responsibilities ==
Roles of the IDS includes facilitating the efficient functioning of multi-service bodies, providing secretarial and domain expertise to the Minister of Defence in all proposals of capital defence procurements and providing the building of cooperation through intra-service deliberations for procurements, joint doctrines, joint training and common procedures. The Defence Cyber Agency, the Defence Space Agency, the Armed Forces Special Operations Division and the Armed Force Strategic Missile/Rocket Command, will function under the IDS. The colour of jointmanship of the three services is purple, hence, the term 'Purple Fraternity' is applied to their ranks.

== History ==
Post-independence, a military wing was created inside the Cabinet Secretariat. The wing was later shifted to the Ministry of Defence. The wing was headed by Joint Secretary (Military), a major general (or equivalent)-level officer, who was responsible for keeping the Cabinet Secretary informed through the Defence Secretary about defence-related issues and had various other responsibilities including on coordination-related matters.

The Defence Planning Staff was established under the Ministry of Defence in 1986 to provide assistance to the Chiefs of Staff Committee. Comprising representatives from the Ministry of External Affairs, the Ministry of Defence (including one scientist from the Defence Research and Development Organisation) and the Ministry of Finance, the organisation was headed by Director General Defence Planning Staff (DG DPS), a Lieutenant general (or equivalent)-level position held in rotation by the three services, and had five divisions. The DG DPS had the status of a vice chief of staff.

After the Kargil War between India and Pakistan, the Kargil Review Committee (KRC) was set up by the Government of India on 29 July 1999 under the chairpersonship of retired Indian Administrative Service officer and former Defence Production Secretary, K. Subrahmanyam. The committee submitted its report to the prime minister, Atal Bihari Vajpayee, on 7 January 2000 and was tabled in the Parliament of India on 23 February 2000.

Following KRC's report, a group of ministers (GoM) was set up on 17 April 2000 to consider the recommendations in the Kargil Review Committee Report, as well as to review national security more thoroughly. The GoM consisted of L. K. Advani, George Fernandes, Jaswant Singh, Yashwant Sinha, the ministers of home affairs, defence, external affairs, and finance, respectively. Brajesh Mishra, National Security Advisor, was assigned as a special guest to the meetings of the GoM and the Cabinet Secretariat (National Security Council Secretariat) provided any help required. The GoM came out with its own report, "Reforming the National Security System". The GoM report was submitted by them to Prime Minister Vajpayee on 26 February 2001.

Pursuant to the recommendations of the KRC and GoM, as well as prior recommendations by the Standing Committee on Defence of the Parliament of India, the Government of India constituted the Integrated Defence Staff under the Ministry of Defence through a notification on 23 November 2001. The Defence Planning Staff and the Military Wing inside the Ministry of Defence were merged into IDS. IDS celebrates its raising day on 1 October every year, 2026 being the 26th.

From 9 to 13 September 2024, Headquarters Integrated Defence Staff (HQ IDS) will implement a Combined Operational Review and Evaluation (CORE) Programme. The senior officers of the tri-services will participate in the CORE programme to enhance their strategic planning and operational capabilities. The programme, held at the United Services Institution (USI), aims to train senior military personnel for future leadership positions, according to the Ministry of Defence. It is intended for officers of the rank Major General and equivalent officers from all three services, along with officers from the Ministry of Defence, Ministry of External Affairs, and Ministry of Home Affairs.

== Organisational structure ==
The body is headed by the Chief of Integrated Defence Staff, who is a Vice Chief of Staff rank-level officer and is also Vice Chief of Defence Staff. It consists of various branches, divisions, and directorates. The CISC is assisted by five Deputy Chiefs of Integrated Staff, who are Lieutenant general or equivalent level officers and head different branches. An assistant chief of integrated defence staff— Major general (or equivalent) level officer heads a division, whilst a deputy assistant chief of integrated staff heads a directorate. The organisation is staffed by officers and personnel from the three services, together with officials from the Ministry of External Affairs and the Defence Accounts Department and the Defence Research and Development Organisation of the Ministry of Defence.

Different branches under the Chiefs of Staff Committee are:
Branch	Appointee	Photo	Reference
Policy Planning & Force Development (PP & FD)	Air Marshal Praveen Keshav Vohra, UYSM, AVSM, VM		
Operations (Ops)	Lieutenant General Zubin A. Minwalla, UYSM, AVSM, YSM		
Doctrine, Organisation and Training (DOT)	Vice Admiral Rajesh Dhankhar, AVSM, NM		
Intelligence (Defence Intelligence Agency)	Lieutenant General V. Hariharan, AVSM, SM		
Medical	Surgeon Vice Admiral Krishna M Adhikari		

=== Headquarters ===
The Headquarters of the Integrated Defence Staff (HQ-IDS) is located in New Delhi. The Chiefs of Staff Committee (COSC), its secretariat, and certain other components are situated in South Block, Secretariat Building, New Delhi. The major portion of the HQ-IDS is located at Kashmir House, New Delhi. The HQ IDS functions as the secretariat to the chairman of COSC. The new HQ Integrated Defence Staff building complex is at Mehram Nagar, Delhi Cantonment.

== See also ==
Integrated entities

- Defence Planning Committee, tri-services command at the policy level with NSA as its chief
- Defence Cyber Agency, tri-services command
- Defence Space Agency draws staff from all 3 services of the Indian Armed Forces
- Integrated Rocket Force, planned tri-services missile/rocket force
- Armed Forces Special Operations Division, tri-services command at the operational level under the Integrated Defence Staff
- Indian Nuclear Command Authority
  - Strategic Forces Command, nuclear command of India
- Andaman and Nicobar Command, first operational tri-services command

Assets

- List of Indian Air Force stations
- List of Indian Navy bases
- List of active Indian Navy ships
- India's overseas military bases

Other nations

- Special Operations Forces Command (KSSO) - Russian equivalent command
- Joint Special Operations Command (JSOC) - U.S. equivalent command

General concepts

- Joint warfare, general concept
- Minimum Credible Deterrence
- List of cyber warfare forces of other nations

== Bibliography ==
- Integrated Defence Staff. "History" (PDF). Integrated Defence Staff.
- Controller of Defence Accounts (Integrated Defence Staff). Defence Accounts Department Office Manual 2014 Edition Chapter 1. The Controller General of Defence Accounts. National Informatics Centre.
