= Kashmir House =

Coordinates: 28.601097°N 77.222825°E

Kashmir House is the former residence of the Maharajah of Kashmir in Delhi, India. It is located on Rajaji Marg in Delhi.

The Engineer-in-Chief's branch is headquartered at Kashmir House.
