= Kargil Review Committee =

Indian governmental committee

The Kargil Review Committee (KRC) was set up by the Government of India on 29 July 1999, three days after the end of the Kargil War. The committee was set up "to examine the sequence of events and make recommendations for the future".

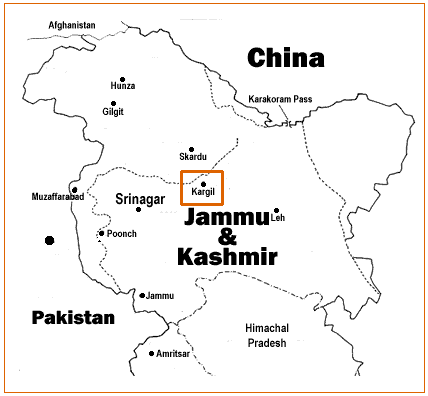
Site of the conflict

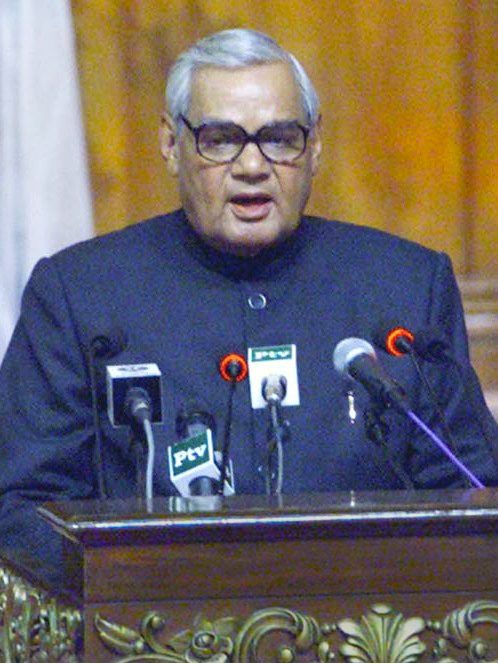
The report was submitted to the Prime Minister of India, Atal Bihari Vajpayee, on 7 January 2000

Over a hundred senior military, civil service and intelligence officials, politicians, including former prime ministers, diplomats and journalists were interviewed by the committee over a period of five months. The report was completed on 15 December 1999 and was tabled in the Parliament of India on 23 February 2000. Certain parts of the final KRC report, such as the findings, have remained confidential and classified.

The Committee found numerous flaws on multiple level of intelligence collection, operational strategies and procedural sharing of data. As per the KRC's recommendations, a Group of Ministers (GoM) and several task forces were set up to do a complete review of the Indian security system. The GoM subsequently conducted a comprehensive review of the entire security apparatus. This became the first review of its kind in independent India's history to be made public, although in the interests of national security, the government initially redacted several parts. The recommendations of the KRC report and the GoM report led to far-reaching changes in the Indian security apparatus.

== Background ==
The Kargil Review Committee laid out the context of the report. They noted that the national security system in the country had seen very little changes since the 52-year-old framework outlined by Hastings Ismay and recommended by Louis Mountbatten. In these 52 years, India had undergone the Sino-Indian War, the Indo-Pakistani War of 1965, and the Indo-Pakistani War of 1971, as well as increased nuclear danger, the Cold War, persistence of the hybrid war in Kashmir for more than ten years, and a revolution in military affairs elsewhere.

India tried major defence reforms following the Sino-Indian War in 1962, but these did not address national security in a holistic way. They decided to assess defence needs on a five-year basis, leading to the First Defence Plan. The Ministry of Defence and, subsequently the Department of Defence Production, Defence Research and Development Organisation and services headquarters, set up planning cells and units. A Joint Intelligence Committee was also formed. The Directorate General of Defence Planning Staff, composed of officers of various services, was formed to synergise defence planning under the Chiefs of Staff Committee in 1986.

== Members ==
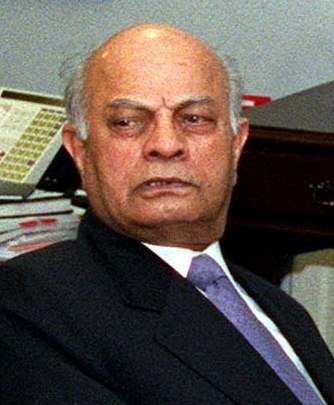
Brajesh Mishra, the national security advisor at the time.

The committee consisted of:

- K. Subrahmanyam (chairperson), retired Indian Administrative Service officer and head of the National Security Council Advisory Board (NSCAB)
- Lt Gen K. K. Hazari, former Vice Chief of the Army Staff
- B.G. Verghese, member National Security Council Advisory Board
- Satish Chandra, secretary of the National Security Council Secretariat and member-secretary of KRC

Brajesh Mishra, the national security advisor at the time, assisted in the establishment of the Kargil Review Committee.

== Timeline ==
- 3 May 1999: A Pakistani intrusion in Kargil is reported by local shepherds.
- 24 July 1999: The Union cabinet of India gathers a committee to look into the Kargil War.
- 26 July 1999: The Kargil War officially comes to an end and the Indian Army announces complete eviction of Pakistani intruders.
- 29 July 1999: Kargil Review Committee (KRC) is set up.
- 15 December 1999: KRC Report finalised.
- 7 January 2000: The committee submits its report to the prime minister, Atal Bihari Vajpayee, on 7 January 2000
- 23 February 2000: KRC Report tables in Parliament.
- 17 April 2000: The government establishes a Group of Ministers (GoM) to comprehensively scrutinise the national security system in its totality and "in particular to consider the recommendations of the Kargil Review Committee and formulate specific proposals for implementation".
- 26 February 2001: The GoM finalises its report.

== Kargil Review Committee report ==
The Kargil Review Committee was initially given a period of three months to submit the report. The deadline was later extended to 15 December 1999, giving the committee five months instead. In the report, the committee pointed out that they would not assign any individual blame. The report's scope was to

review the events leading up to the Pakistani aggression in the Kargil District of Ladakh in Jammu & Kashmir; and to recommend such measures as are considered necessary to safeguard national security against such armed intrusions.

Over a hundred senior military, civil service and intelligence officials, politicians, including former prime ministers, diplomats and journalists were interviewed. Unlike previous reports of a similar nature, this report was published and made publicly available, though some parts were blanked.

The second and third chapters of the report are devoted to a historical background of the events leading up to the war, covering issues such as the Simla Agreement, Pakistan's attempts at internationalising the Kashmir issue, the "Rajiv-Benazir" interlude, Siachen, the Indo-Pak dialogue in general and the impact of the proxy war on the Indian Army. Chapter 5 reconstructs the Kargil intrusion. In Chapter 6, the committee outlines the role and function of intelligence agencies. Chapters 7 and 8 discusses and analyses intelligence on the Kargil issue, as well as the army's subsequent response. Chapter 13 and 14 summarises the findings and offers further recommendations.

=== Findings ===
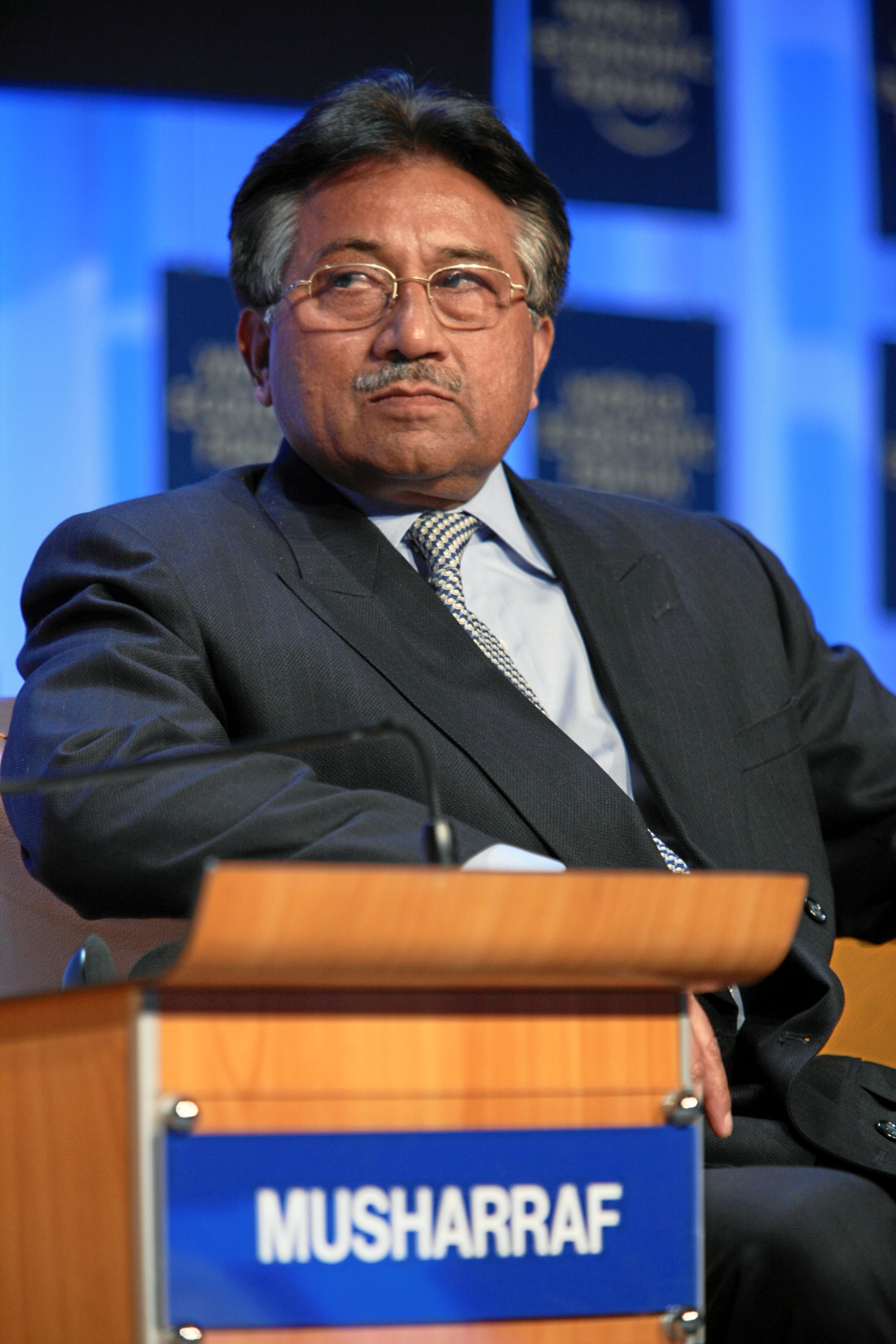
General Pervez Musharraf

Chapter 13 of the report outlines the findings of the committee. It clearly states that the intrusion had been a surprise for the Indian government. After elaborating on the history of the "Kargil plan", the committee discusses the government's, army's, and media's respective responses. They then outline the intelligence findings, elaborating on the role of the Research and Analysis Wing (R&AW), Intelligence Bureau and the military intelligence collection just prior to the war, as well as the lack of inter-agency coordination. The Kargil Review Committee found R&AW's human intelligence to be weak, but Chapter 14 also praises the interception of telephone conversations of Pervez Musharraf in China. The KRC report also acknowledges the work of the Aviation Research Centre of R&AW, which produced aerial intelligence after the intrusion's detection. The report goes into detail regarding the nuclear, technological and media effects of the incident.

The report also mentions that the Kargil War could perhaps have been avoided if troops had been stationed there, but also notes that had troops been stationed there all year round and the conflict had still occurred, it would have resulted in huge costs "and enabled Pakistan to bleed India."

=== Recommendations ===
The KRC suggested a "thorough review of the national security system in its entirety", conducted by a credible body of experts. It also suggested that various task forces should also review specific parts of the system, including:

- National Security Council
- Intelligence
- Counter-terrorist operations
- Border Management
- Defence Budget and Modernisation
- National Security Management and Apex Decision Making
- India's Nuclear Policy
- Media Relations and Information
- Technology
- Civil–Military Liaison
- Declaratory Policy for LOC

== Group of Ministers ==
Following the Kargil Review Committee report, a Group of Ministers (GoM) was set up by the Cabinet Committee on Security (CCS) on 17 April 2000 to consider the recommendations in the Kargil Review Committee. The GoM consisted of the ministers of home affairs, defence, external affairs and finance. Brajesh Mishra, the National Security Advisor, was also assigned as a special guest to the meetings of the GoM and the Cabinet Secretariat provided help to the group.

The GoM established task forces, as suggested in the KRC report:

- Task Force on Intelligence Apparatus: G. C. Saxena, a retired Indian Police Service officer, the Jammu and Kashmir governor at the time and a former RAW chief
- Task Force on Internal Security: N. N. Vohra, a retired Indian Administrative Service officer and Principal Secretary to the Prime Minister of India, Defence Secretary and Home Secretary
- Task Force on Border Management: Madhav Godbole, retired Indian Administrative Service officer and former Home Secretary
- Task Force on Management of Defence: Arun Singh, advisor in the Ministry of External Affairs and former Minister of State for Defence

The GoM came out with its own report "Reforming the National Security System". It was submitted to Prime Minister Vajpayee on 26 February 2001.

== Implementation and impact ==
Among the recommendations in the Kargil Review Committee report, the following have been implemented:

- A thorough review of the national security system in India, which was done by the GoM
- A full-time National Security Advisor
- Improved aerial surveillance, which has been accomplished by setting up RISAT satellites and inducting UAVs.
- A centralised communication and electronic intelligence agency, which resulted in the establishment of the National Technical Research Organisation in 2004.
- A Defence Intelligence Agency
- The establishment of think tanks, which has resulted in organizations like the Centre for Joint Warfare Studies.
- The reduction of the age profile in the army

The Kargil Review Committee also recommended that the government find ways to reduce the pension expenditure, which has not yet been implemented.

From among the recommendations in the GoM report, the following have been implemented:

- The creation of the post for a Chief of Defence Staff, which was accepted by the Cabinet Committee on Security and was implemented in December 2019.
- The creation of additional tri-services organisations; in particular, the Integrated Defence Staff, the Andaman and Nicobar Command, the Nuclear Command Authority, Strategic Forces Command, the Department of Ex-servicemen Welfare, the Defence Technology Council and the Defence Acquisition Council have been established.
- An identity card, which has been implemented as the Aadhaar card.

== Aftermath ==
Following the Kargil Review Committee, Group of Ministers and the task forces, other committees have been formed to follow up on the Kargil Review Committee recommendations and further assess national security. These groups include the Standing Committee on Defence in 2007, Naresh Chandra task force in 2011 and the Ravindra Gupta task force in 2012.

=== Standing Committee on Defence review ===
In July 2007, the Standing Committee on Defence and the Ministry of Defence presented a report titled "Review of Implementation Status of Group of Ministers (GoMs) Report on Reforming National Security System in Pursuance to Kargil Review Committee Report—A Special Reference to Management of Defence" as a follow-up to the Kargil Review Committee report and the Group of Minister report.

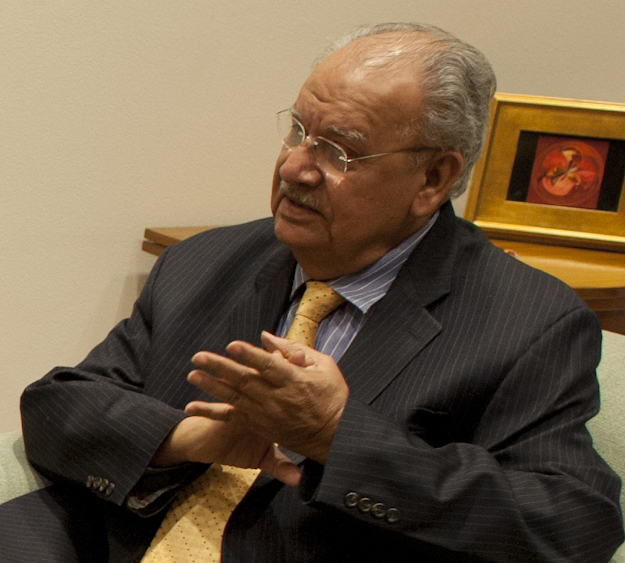
Naresh Chandra

=== Naresh Chandra task force ===
In 2011, the Naresh Chandra task force reviewed the recommendations of the Kargil Review Committee, assessed the implementation and accordingly suggested new changes needed related to national security. The task force was led by Naresh Chandra and comprised thirteen other members. The committee submitted its report on 23 May 2012.

According to the task force many of the main recommendations of the Kargil Review Committee have not been implemented, such as recommendations related to defence procurement. The task force further suggested framing a National Security Doctrine (National Security Strategy) among other things.

== Bibliography ==
- Kargil Review Committee (July 2000). From Surprise To Reckoning: The Kargil Review Committee Report. New Delhi. Sage Publications. ISBN 9780761994664
- Report of the Group of Ministers on National Security, Retrieved from original from Vivekananda International Foundation on 12 December 2018.
- Standing Committee on Defence (2006–2007), Ministry of Defence, 14th Lok Sabha (July 2007). "Twenty-Second Report. Review of Implementation Status of Group of Ministers (GoMs) Report on Reforming National Security System in Pursuance to Kargil Review Committee Report—A Special Reference to Management of Defence" Lok Sabha Secretariat. New Delhi. Archived from the original on 21 October 2012. Retrieved on 12 December 2018 from Institute for Defence Studies and Analyses.
- Anit Mukherjee (March 2011), Failing to Deliver: Post-Crises Defence Reforms in India, 1998–2010. Institute for Defence Studies and Analyses (IDSA), New Delhi. ISBN 81-86019-88-X
- (25 February 2000). Kargil Review Committee report, Executive Summary Retrieved from nuclearweaponarchive.org, 12 December 2018.
