= Strategic Forces Command =

Tri-service strategic command of the Indian Armed Forces

- Formation Sign of the Strategic Forces Command
- Founded: 4 January 2003; 23 years ago
- Country: India
- Branch: Indian Armed Forces
- Type: Integrated tri-service command
- Role: Management and administration of India's strategic forces
- Nickname: SFC

Commanders
- Commander-in-Chief: Lieutenant General Dinesh Singh Rana

The Strategic Forces Command (SFC) is an integrated tri-service command of the Indian Armed Forces responsible for the management and administration of India's strategic forces. It forms part of the command-and-control structure established under the Nuclear Command Authority (NCA).

The command was established on 4 January 2003, when the Cabinet Committee on Security approved the appointment of a Commander-in-Chief, Strategic Forces Command for the management and administration of India's strategic forces.

As of 2026, the Commander-in-Chief is Lieutenant General Dinesh Singh Rana.

== History ==
The Strategic Forces Command was created as part of the institutional arrangements adopted by the Government of India for implementing the country's nuclear doctrine.

On 4 January 2003, the Cabinet Committee on Security formally constituted the two-tier Nuclear Command Authority, consisting of a Political Council chaired by the Prime Minister of India and an Executive Council chaired by the National Security Adviser.

At the same time, the government approved the appointment of a Commander-in-Chief of the Strategic Forces Command to manage and administer the country's strategic forces.

Air Marshal Teja Mohan Asthana became the first Commander-in-Chief of the command.

== Command and organisation ==
The Strategic Forces Command is a tri-service organisation drawing personnel from the Indian Army, Indian Navy and Indian Air Force.

The command is headed by the Commander-in-Chief, Strategic Forces Command (C-in-C SFC), a three-star officer of the Indian Armed Forces.

The SFC forms part of India's nuclear command-and-control architecture and is responsible for implementing directions issued through the Nuclear Command Authority.

Following the creation of the post of Chief of Defence Staff (CDS), the CDS was assigned the role of military adviser to the Nuclear Command Authority.

The SFC is also one of the integrated tri-service organisations functioning directly under the Chiefs of Staff Committee. In May 2023, the command received a CDS Unit Citation for its performance during 2021–22.

== Role ==
The command manages and administers the military forces assigned to India's strategic deterrent and provides the military component of the country's nuclear command-and-control structure.

The authority to approve the use of nuclear weapons does not reside with the SFC. Under India's publicly declared command structure, that authority rests solely with the Political Council of the Nuclear Command Authority chaired by the Prime Minister.

The SFC conducts user-training and operational-validation launches of strategic missile systems. The Ministry of Defence has repeatedly described such launches as being conducted either by, or under the aegis of, the Strategic Forces Command.

== Missile operations and tests ==
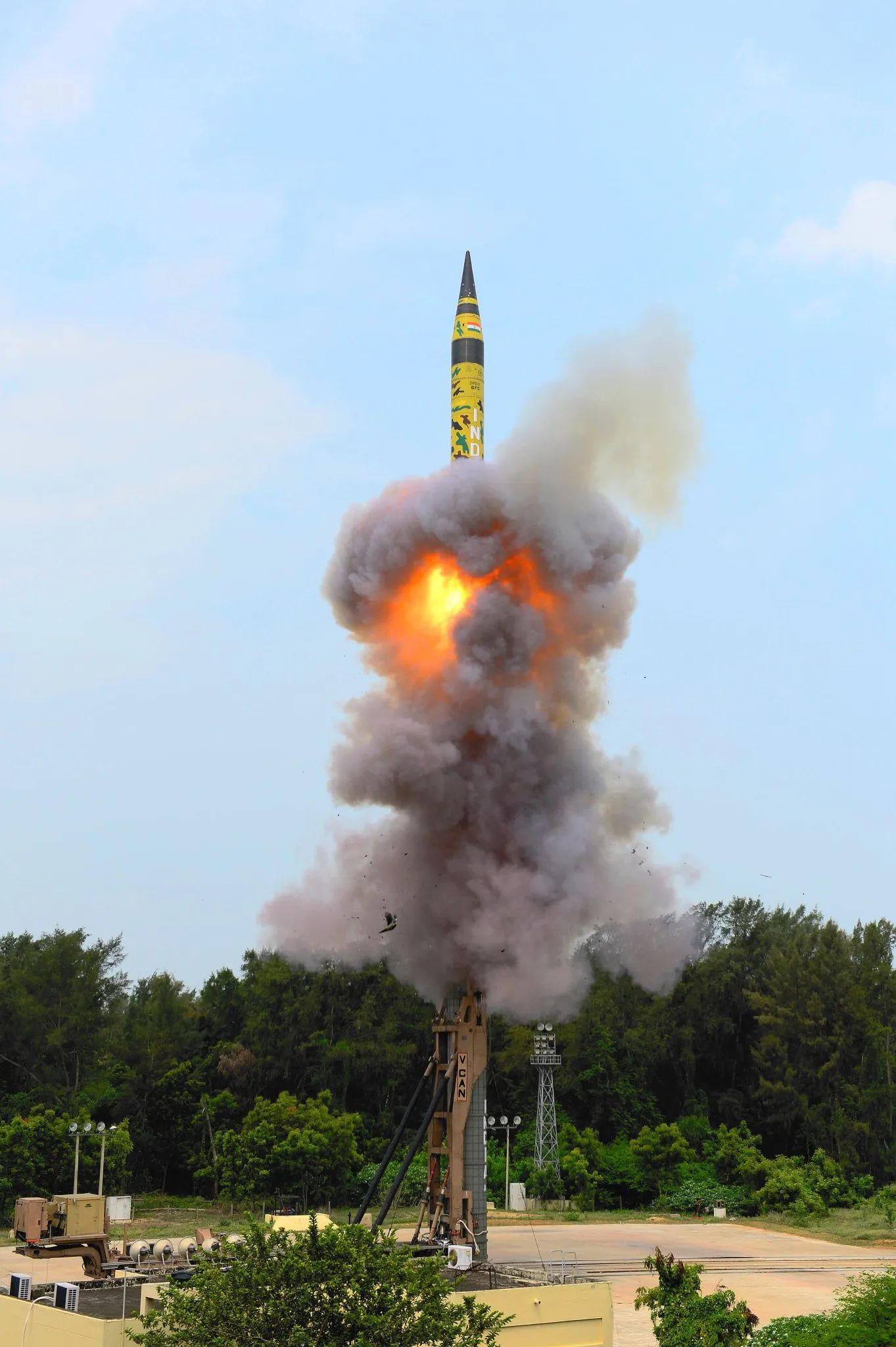
An Agni-V missile during a canisterised launch test in 2018.

Public announcements by the Ministry of Defence provide information about a number of missile launches conducted by or under the aegis of the Strategic Forces Command. They do not provide a complete public inventory of systems assigned to the command.

=== Agni series ===
The SFC has conducted operational and training launches involving several members of the Agni missile family.

In November 2022, an Agni-III intermediate-range ballistic missile was launched from Dr. Abdul Kalam Island as part of a routine user-training launch conducted under the aegis of the Strategic Forces Command. The Ministry of Defence stated that the launch validated the operational parameters of the system.

On 22 May 2026, an Agni-I ballistic missile was successfully test-launched from the Integrated Test Range at Chandipur, Odisha. The Ministry of Defence stated that the launch validated the system's operational and technical parameters and was conducted under the aegis of the Strategic Forces Command.

On 6 August 2026, an Agni-IV ballistic missile was test-fired from the Integrated Test Range at Chandipur. The government stated that the launch validated all operational and technical parameters and was conducted under the aegis of the SFC.

=== Agni-Prime ===
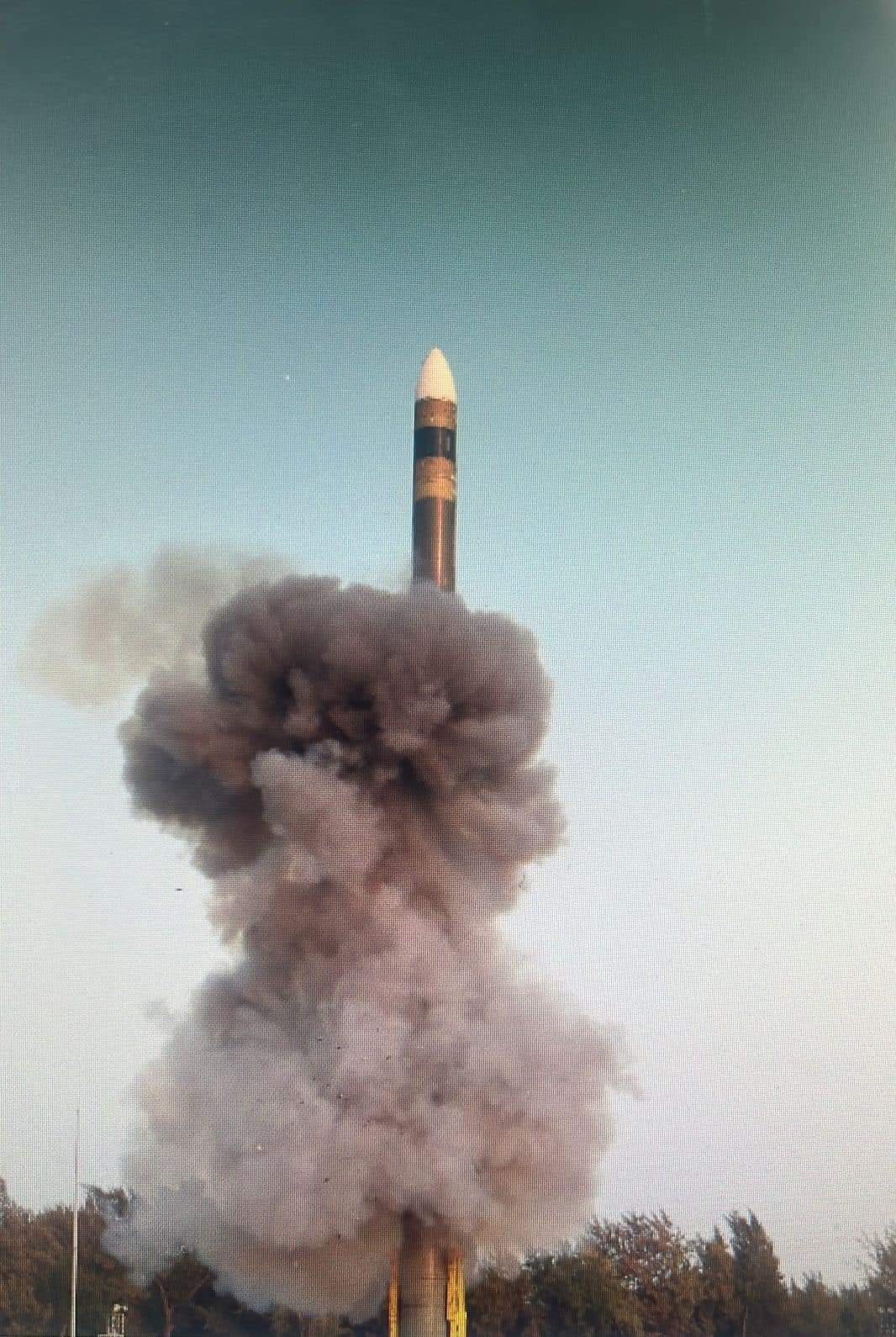
An Agni-series missile test in 2024.

On 3 April 2024, the Strategic Forces Command and the Defence Research and Development Organisation (DRDO) jointly conducted a flight test of the new-generation Agni-P ballistic missile from Dr. APJ Abdul Kalam Island. The test met its stated trial objectives and was observed by the Chief of Defence Staff, the Chief of Strategic Forces Command and senior DRDO and Indian Army officials.

On 24 September 2025, DRDO and the Strategic Forces Command conducted an Agni-Prime launch from a specially designed rail-based mobile launcher under what the Ministry of Defence described as a full operational scenario.

The government stated following the September 2025 test that the road-mobile version of Agni-P had already been inducted after a series of successful flight trials.

== Relationship with the Nuclear Command Authority ==
The Nuclear Command Authority is the political and executive command structure governing India's nuclear forces, while the Strategic Forces Command constitutes its principal military operational component.

The NCA consists of:

- the Political Council, chaired by the Prime Minister of India; and
- the Executive Council, chaired by the National Security Adviser.

The Political Council is the sole body authorised to approve the use of nuclear weapons. The Executive Council provides information and advice to the Political Council and implements its directives.

The SFC operates within this framework and manages the strategic forces required to implement authorised directives.

== Nuclear doctrine ==
The creation of the Strategic Forces Command accompanied the formal operationalisation of India's nuclear doctrine in January 2003.

India's declared doctrine is based on maintaining a credible minimum deterrent and a policy of No First Use. The government has stated that nuclear weapons would be used in retaliation against a nuclear attack on Indian territory or Indian forces.

The doctrine also provides that nuclear retaliation can be authorised only by the civilian political leadership through the Nuclear Command Authority.

== Commander-in-Chief ==
The Commander-in-Chief of the Strategic Forces Command is a three-star officer drawn from the Indian Armed Forces.

Lieutenant General Dinesh Singh Rana was appointed Commander-in-Chief in 2025, succeeding Vice Admiral Suraj Berry. Rana was publicly serving in the appointment during 2026.

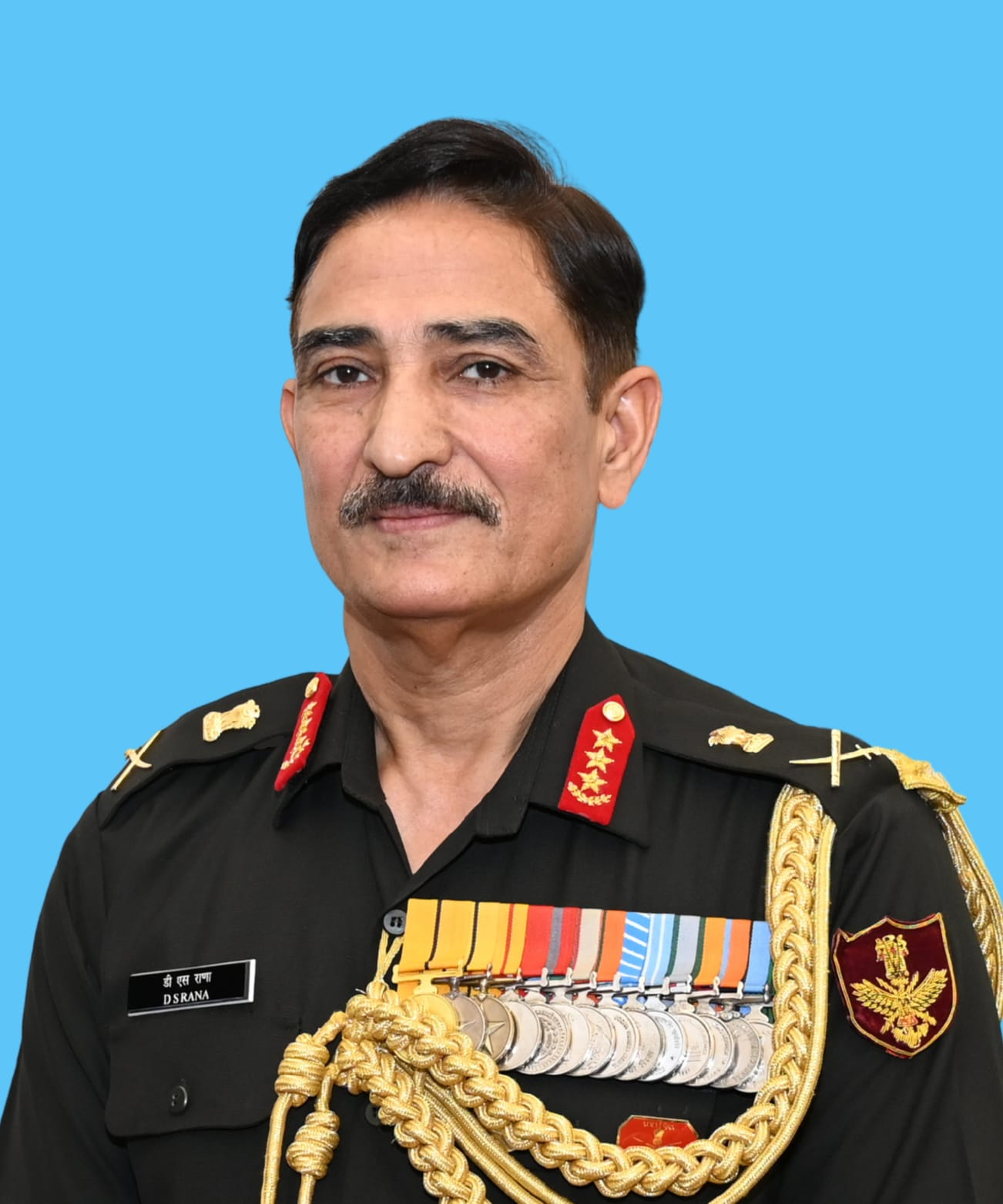
Lieutenant General Dinesh Singh Rana, Commander-in-Chief of the Strategic Forces Command.

Previous commanders have been drawn from the Army, Navy and Air Force, reflecting the tri-service character of the organisation.

== See also ==
- Nuclear Command Authority (India)
- Commander-in-Chief, Strategic Forces Command
- Chief of Defence Staff (India)
- Integrated Defence Staff
- India and weapons of mass destruction
- Nuclear weapons of India
- Nuclear doctrine of India
- Agni (missile)
- Agni-P
- Nuclear triad
- Arihant-class submarine
- Defence Research and Development Organisation
- Indian Armed Forces Tri-Service Commands
