= Nuclear Command Authority (India) =

Indian government agency

- Emblem of the Government of India

Agency overview
- Formed: 4 January 2003; 23 years ago
- Jurisdiction: Government of India
- Headquarters: New Delhi, India
- Agency executives: Prime Minister of India, Chair, Political Council; National Security Adviser, Chair, Executive Council; Chief of Defence Staff, Military Adviser

The Nuclear Command Authority (NCA) is India's apex command-and-control structure for decisions concerning the use of India's nuclear weapons. It was formally established by the Cabinet Committee on Security on 4 January 2003 as part of the operationalisation of India's nuclear doctrine.

The NCA consists of two bodies: a Political Council chaired by the Prime Minister of India and an Executive Council chaired by the National Security Adviser. The Political Council is the sole body authorised to approve the use of nuclear weapons. The Executive Council provides inputs for decision-making and implements directives issued by the Political Council.

India's nuclear command structure is based on civilian political control. In 2018, the Government of India described the country's arrangements as involving a robust nuclear command-and-control structure, a safety-assurance architecture and strict political control under the NCA.

== History ==
Following India's Pokhran-II nuclear tests in May 1998, the government developed a formal doctrine and command structure for the country's nuclear forces.

On 4 January 2003, the Cabinet Committee on Security reviewed progress in operationalising India's nuclear doctrine and formally constituted the Nuclear Command Authority.

The same decision established the two-tier Political Council and Executive Council structure and approved the appointment of a Commander-in-Chief, Strategic Forces Command to manage and administer India's strategic forces.

The government also approved arrangements for alternative chains of command for retaliatory nuclear strikes in different circumstances, although the details of those arrangements have not been made public.

The NCA subsequently met in September 2003 to review the arrangements established for India's strategic forces.

In October 2004, the NCA reviewed India's nuclear capabilities and the command-and-control structures that had been established and approved measures intended to sustain the country's nuclear and missile capabilities within the framework of India's nuclear doctrine.

== Structure ==
=== Political Council ===
The Political Council is chaired by the Prime Minister of India. Under the arrangements announced in January 2003, it is the sole body empowered to authorise the use of nuclear weapons.

The Political Council constitutes the highest political level of India's nuclear command structure and is intended to maintain civilian control over decisions concerning nuclear-weapon use.

=== Executive Council ===
The Executive Council is chaired by the National Security Adviser. It provides information and advice for decisions by the Nuclear Command Authority and is responsible for executing directives issued by the Political Council.

=== Chief of Defence Staff ===
The Chief of Defence Staff (CDS) serves as the Military Adviser to the Nuclear Command Authority. This function was formally included among the responsibilities of the CDS when the post was created in 2019.

The CDS therefore provides the NCA with professional military advice while decisions concerning nuclear use remain under the political command structure.

== Nuclear doctrine ==
The Cabinet Committee on Security's January 2003 decision set out the principal elements of India's operational nuclear doctrine.

The doctrine is based on a credible minimum deterrent and a policy of No First Use. Under the declared policy, nuclear weapons are intended for retaliation against a nuclear attack on Indian territory or on Indian forces.

The doctrine states that nuclear retaliation to a first strike would be intended to inflict unacceptable damage. Nuclear retaliatory attacks may be authorised only by the civilian political leadership through the Nuclear Command Authority.

India has also declared that nuclear weapons will not be used against non-nuclear-weapon states. The 2003 doctrine, however, reserved the option of nuclear retaliation in the event of a major attack against India or Indian forces using chemical or biological weapons.

The government reiterated the principles of credible minimum deterrence and No First Use in November 2018 following the first deterrence patrol of INS Arihant.

== Strategic Forces Command ==
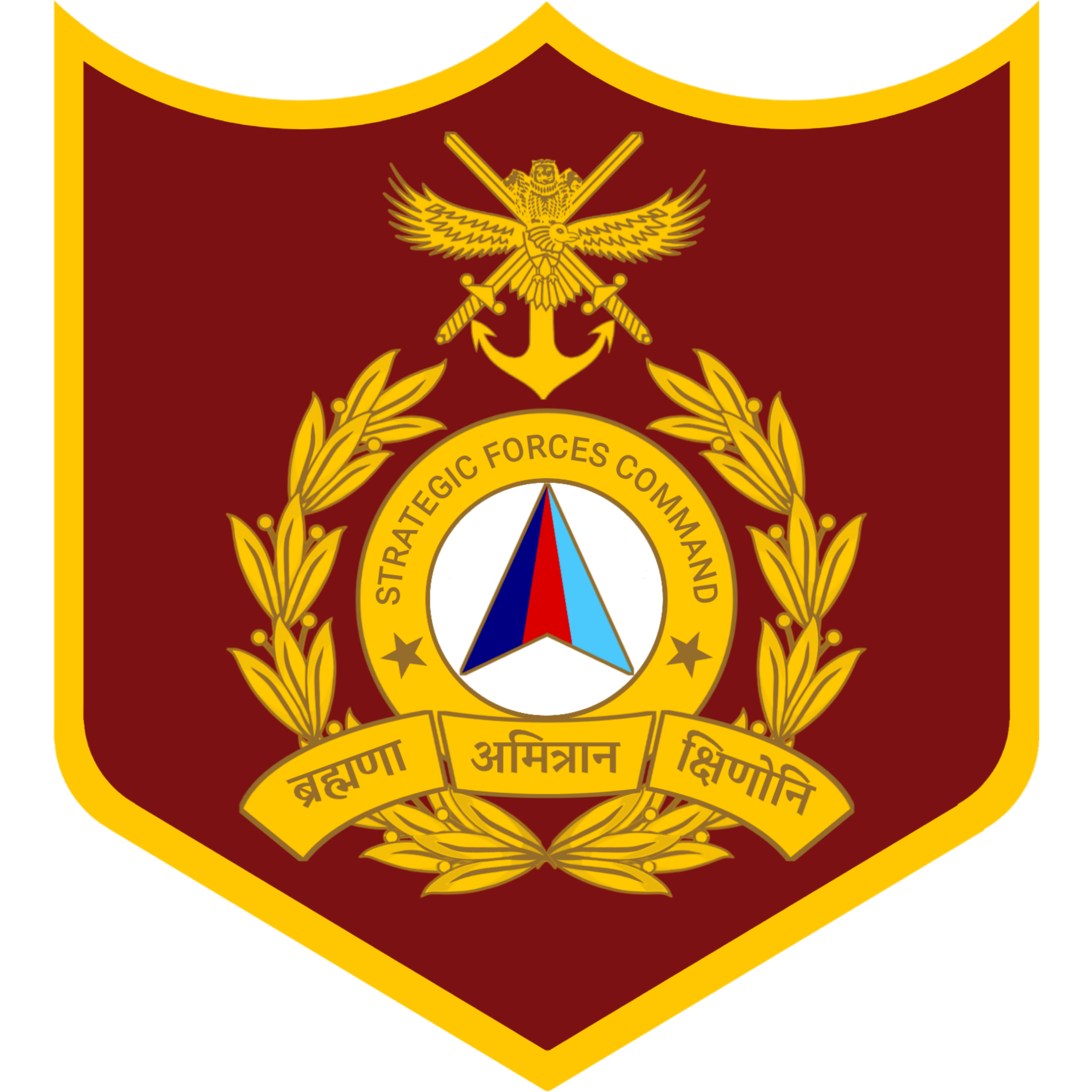
Insignia of the Strategic Forces Command.

The Strategic Forces Command (SFC) is the tri-service military command responsible for the management and administration of India's strategic forces.

Its establishment was approved alongside the Nuclear Command Authority on 4 January 2003. The Cabinet Committee on Security authorised the appointment of a Commander-in-Chief, Strategic Forces Command for the management and administration of strategic forces.

The SFC functions as the military organisation responsible for implementing directives issued through the nuclear command structure.

The command conducts operational and training launches of strategic missile systems. For example, in November 2022 an Agni-III training launch was conducted under the aegis of the Strategic Forces Command.

In September 2025, the Defence Research and Development Organisation and Strategic Forces Command carried out a launch of the Agni-P missile from a rail-based mobile launcher. The Ministry of Defence stated that the road-mobile version of Agni-P had already been inducted into service.

== Nuclear triad ==
India has developed land-, air- and sea-based strategic capabilities intended to support a nuclear triad.

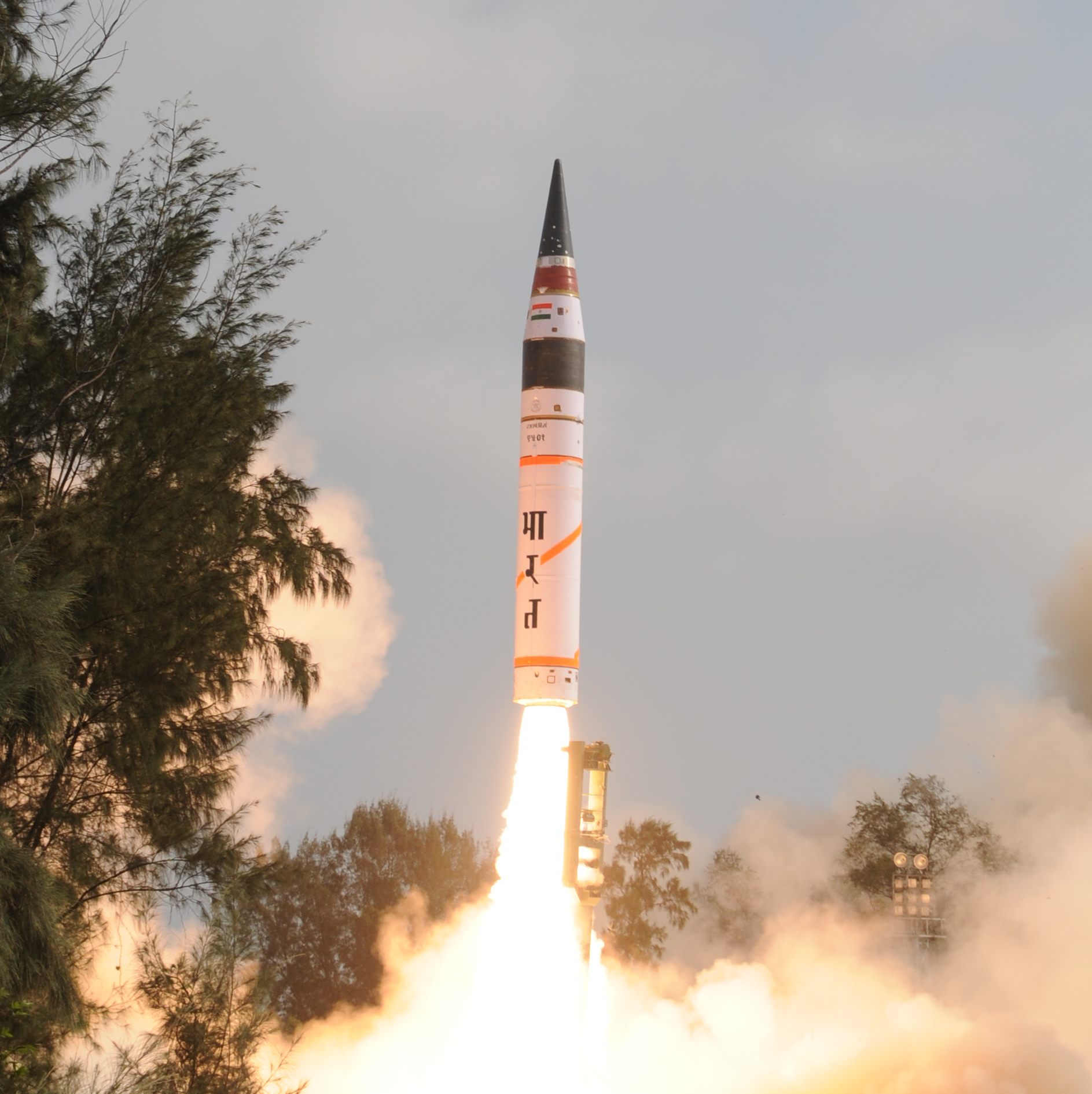
An Agni-V during its first flight test in April 2012.

In November 2018, the Government of India announced that the first deterrence patrol of the nuclear-powered ballistic-missile submarine INS Arihant had been completed. The government described the patrol as completing the establishment of India's survivable nuclear triad.

The government stated that the sea-based component provided a survivable element of India's deterrent and formed part of the country's credible minimum deterrence posture.

In October 2022, INS Arihant conducted a successful launch of a submarine-launched ballistic missile. The Ministry of Defence said the test validated the weapon system's operational and technological parameters.

=== INS Arighaat ===
On 29 August 2024, the second Arihant-class submarine, INS Arighaat, was commissioned into the Indian Navy at Visakhapatnam.

The Ministry of Defence stated that the addition of Arighaat would strengthen India's nuclear triad and nuclear deterrence, and that operating both Arihant and Arighaat would increase the country's deterrent capability.

== Strategic missile development ==
India's strategic missile capability has continued to develop alongside the command structure administered through the NCA and Strategic Forces Command.

In March 2024, the Defence Research and Development Organisation conducted Mission Divyastra, the first flight test of the indigenously developed Agni-V equipped with Multiple Independently Targetable Re-entry Vehicle (MIRV) technology.

The test involved multiple re-entry vehicles and was monitored by telemetry and radar stations. The Defence Research and Development Organisation stated that the mission achieved its designed parameters.

== Nuclear confidence-building measures with Pakistan ==
India and Pakistan have established a number of nuclear confidence-building mechanisms intended to reduce the risk of misunderstandings and accidental escalation.

During expert-level talks on nuclear confidence-building measures in June 2004, the two countries agreed to establish a dedicated and secure hotline between their Foreign Secretaries through their respective foreign ministries.

The two sides also discussed measures including advance notification of missile tests and mechanisms intended to reduce nuclear risks.

== See also ==
- Strategic Forces Command
- Commander-in-Chief, Strategic Forces Command
- Chief of Defence Staff (India)
- India and weapons of mass destruction
- Nuclear weapons of India
- Nuclear doctrine of India
- Credible minimum deterrence
- No first use
- Nuclear triad
- Arihant-class submarine
- Agni (missile)
- Defence Research and Development Organisation
- National Security Council (India)
