= Joint warfare =

Military doctrine

Joint warfare is a military doctrine that places priority on the integration of the various branches of a state's armed forces into one unified command. Joint warfare is in essence a form of combined arms warfare on a larger, national scale, in which complementary forces from a state's army, navy, air, coastal, space, and special forces are meant to work together in joint operations, rather than planning and executing military operations separately.

Its origins can be traced to the 1938 establishment of the Oberkommando der Wehrmacht, the world's first joint higher command structure, though it should not be seen as the same level of "jointness" as U.S. Joint Chiefs of Staff.

The United States Department of Defense, which endorses joint warfare as an overriding doctrine for its forces, describes it as "team warfare", which "requires the integrated and synchronized application of all appropriate capabilities. The synergy that results maximizes combat capability in unified action." This priority on national unity of effort means practitioners of joint warfare must acknowledge the importance of the inter-agency process, including the priorities, capabilities, and resources of other non-uniformed agencies (such as intelligence services) in military planning.

Military operations conducted by armed forces from two or more allied countries are referred to by the U.S. Department of Defense as combined operations.

== See also ==
- Contrast with interservice rivalry
- Battlespace
- Joint base
