= Directorate General of Security (India) =

Indian intelligence organisation

- Suraksha Mahanideshalay सुरक्षा महानिदेशालय
- Emblem of the Government of India

Agency overview
- Formed: February 1965; 61 years ago
- Type: Intelligence organisation
- Jurisdiction: Government of India
- Status: Active
- Headquarters: New Delhi
- Employees: Classified
- Annual budget: Classified
- Minister responsible: Narendra Modi, Prime Minister
- Agency executive: Parag Jain, IPS, Director General (Security) Secretary (R)
- Parent department: Cabinet Secretariat
- Parent agency: Research & Analysis Wing (R&AW)
- Child agencies: Aviation Research Centre; Special Frontier Force (includes Special Group)

The Directorate General of Security is an organisation of covert operations under India's Cabinet Secretariat. It is one of the four legally defined intelligence organisations of India and listed in the Schedule of the Intelligence Organisations (Restriction of Rights) Act, 1985, the other three being I.B., R&AW and NTRO. Since 1971, the Secretary, Research and Analysis Wing has usually held the post of Director General. This organisation used to be composed of Special Service Bureau (now Sashastra Seema Bal), Aviation Research Centre, Special Frontier Force and Chief Inspectorate of Armaments. Since the shifting of SSB and CIOA to the Ministry of Home Affairs in 2001, DGS consists of ARC and SFF only. The Special Group, a non-Tibetan and Sarsawa-based unit of SFF, is also a DGS component.

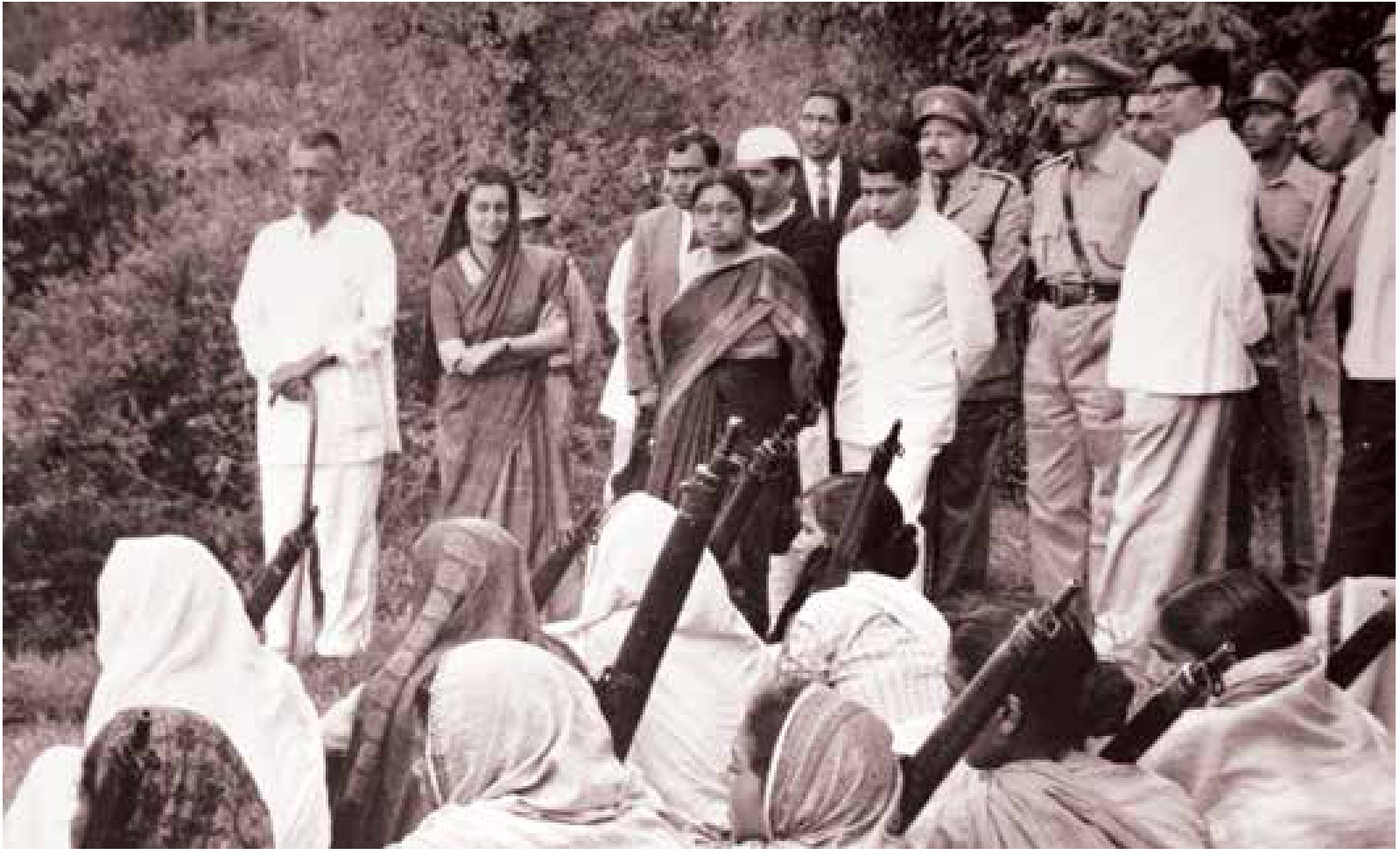

Prime Minister Indira Gandhi, with B. N. Mullik, DG (Security) (extreme right), interacting with the first batch of village volunteers, Women's Advance Training School, Pauri, 1966

== Early history ==
In the wake of the Sino-Indian War of 1962, the Intelligence Bureau raised four new organisations in 1962-63: Indo-Tibetan Border Police (originally raised as Frontier Rifles), SFF, SSB and ARC. Of these four, only ITBP was an open force; one of the joint directors of IB, Sardar Balbir Singh, became its founder chief, while still retaining his post in the IB. The other three organisations were covert. Of these, SFF and ARC were set up with CIA help, as a part of CIA Tibetan program. To monitor these two, a CIA-IB joint operations centre was set up in November 1963 and was given the name, Special Centre. When B. N. Mullik, Director of the Intelligence Bureau retired in October 1964, he was re-employed to oversee these covert operations. His position got formalised in February 1965 as Director General of Security. The DGS was established in the Prime Minister's Secretariat (now Prime Minister's Office). SFF, ARC and SSB, already shifted from the Ministry of External Affairs to the Prime Minister's Secretariat on 1 January 1965, became components of this new organisation. The whole set-up was moved to the Cabinet Secretariat on 1 September 1965. Another organisation, Inspectorate of Armaments (later, Chief Inspectorate of Armaments) was created as a part of DGS in 1969. The DGS was declared as a force under section 45(b)(iii) of the Arms Act, 1959 on 21 August 1969.

== Organisational structure ==
The DGS was headed by a Director General, the post being generally held by the Secretary, R&AW. The No. 2 post was called Principal Director, who actually ran the organisation. Below him, there were five set-ups:

1. Secretariat, headed by Joint Director (Planning & Coordination).
2. Special Service Bureau, headed by Director. Field formations were headed by Divisional Organisers. The divisions were:
  1. Manipur & Nagaland (This division was called Village Volunteer Force)
  2. Arunachal Pradesh (The Divisional Organiser had dual charge, the other being Security Commissioner of NEFA)
  3. North Assam
  4. North Bengal & Sikkim
  5. South Bengal
  6. Uttar Pradesh
  7. Punjab & Himachal Pradesh
  8. Jammu & Kashmir
  9. Rajasthan & Gujarat
  10. Shillong
3. Aviation Research Centre, headed by Director. Field formations, at Charbatia, Odisha, headed by Joint Director; Doom Dooma, Assam, headed by Deputy Director; Sarsawa, Uttar Pradesh, headed by Deputy Director; Dharamshala, Himachal Pradesh; Leh, Ladakh, headed by Assistant Director. Has an air base at Palam, Delhi.
4. Special Frontier Force, headed by Inspector General. Field formation at Chakrata, Uttarakhand, known as Establishment 22, headed by Commandant (equivalent to brigadier). Another field formation at Sarsawa, Uttar Pradesh, which houses the Special Group. Battalions known as Vikas battalions.
5. Chief Inspectorate of Armaments, Delhi-based, headed by Chief Inspector (equivalent to lieutenant colonel).

== Major missions ==
=== Nanda Devi and Nanda Kot Missions ===
Both of these were joint covert operations of CIA and ARC. The purpose was to place a nuclear-powered telemetry relay listening device on a sufficiently high mountain to listen to Chinese radio signals. First attempt was for Mount Nanda Devi in 1965, which failed due to a severe blizzard. Second attempt was for Mount Nanda Kot in 1966, which succeeded. Team leader of the expedition was Navy Captain Mohan Singh Kohli.

=== SSB's resistance movement in 1965 ===
During the Indo-Pakistani War of 1965, village volunteers, male and female, trained in armed guerrilla warfare by SSB, had participated in protecting the Indian border. The founder chief of DGS and SSB, B. N. Mullik described this in details in his 1973 article, The Motto of SSB. Mullik also wrote in that article that by 1965, a million and a half men and women had been trained throughout the border.

=== Training of Mujib Bahini ===
The training of Mukti Bahini was arranged by R&AW at camps of BSF, CRPF, Assam Rifles and Rajasthan Armed Constabulary. But the members of the Mujib Bahini, drawn from Bangladesh Chhatra League, did not want anything to do with Mukti Bahini and the provisional government. So they were trained by SFF at Tandawa, near Chakrata, and by SSB, at Haflong training centre.

=== Operation Mountain Eagle ===
This is the engagement SFF's Tibetan soldiers in the Chittagong Hill Tracts during the Bangladesh War, described in depth by SFF chief Sujan Singh Uban in his Phantoms of Chittagong: The "Fifth Army" in Bangladesh.

=== SSB operations during Bangladesh War ===
Other than training activities, SSB also ran intelligence operations and refugee relief camps on a major scale during the Bangladesh War. As a result, Hara Nath Sarkar and Debakant Kakati, Divisional Organisers of North Bengal and North Assam Divisions, respectively, were awarded the President's Police Medal for Meritorious Service (Bangladesh Special Award).

=== Raising the Special Group ===
This force was raised in 1981, under command of IG, SFF. This unit, unlike Tibetan refugees, is composed entirely of deputationists from the Army. By 1984, it had become the primary counter-terrorism force of India. This force was deployed in Operation Blue Star. After the assassination of Indira Gandhi, the SG was given the responsibility of prime ministerial security till the raising of the Special Protection Group.

=== Raising the National Security Guard ===
R. T. Nagrani, the then Principal Director, DGS, was tasked with the SG operations in the Golden Temple (Both Sundown and Blue Star; Sundown was aborted). After this, under advice of R. N. Kao, who had come back from retirement as Senior Advisor to the Prime Minister (precursor post of today's National Security Advisor), the PM asked Nagrani to raise a separate force for counter-terrorism. Nagrani did it with a core group of SG operatives. This became known as the National Security Guard. Nagrani became its first DG, while still retaining his post of Principal Director, DGS and later, DG (Security).

=== Operation Meghdoot ===
Operation Meghdoot was launched by the Indian Army in 1984 to capture the Siachen Glacier, in which SFF commandos played a pivotal role. One of the Tibetan battalions of SFF is still deployed there.

=== Operation Vijay ===
The DGS had used SFF in the Kargil War in 1999. Earlier, ARC surveillance missions had verified presence of Pakistani troops on the Indian side with photographic evidence.

=== Operation Snow Leopard ===
In the ongoing Sino-Indian border dispute, India used Tibetan components of SFF in 2020–2021 China–India skirmishes, to capture prominent hill tops south of the Pangong Tso in Ladakh on 31 August 2020 and thereafter in the Galwan River Valley conflict.

== Service chiefs ==
From 1965 to 1971, the Director General of Security was a separate post; since then the post has been held by Secretary, R&AW, except a brief interlude, when R. T. Nagrani held the post separately. After creation of the post of Principal Director, the incumbent of that post ran the organisation under the overall command of Secretary (R). The post of PD was shifted to the Ministry of Home Affairs on 15 January 2001 as Director General, SSB; when SSB and CIOA were moved. Thereafter, the post of Director, ARC was raised from Additional Secretary to Special Secretary level with the concomitant role of Head of Department, SFF.

=== Director General (Security) ===
Sr No.	Name	From	Till	Remarks
1	B. N. Mullik, IP	February 1965	6 May 1966	Formerly, Director, Intelligence Bureau
2	M. M. L. Hooja, IP	1 August 1966	15 January 1968	Later, Director, Intelligence Bureau
3	Sardar Balbir Singh, IP	1968	1971	Formerly, founder IG of ITBP
4	Secretary, R&AW	1971	31 January 1986	
5	Ram Tekchand Nagrani, RAS	31 January 1986	25 September 1986	Concurrent with Director General, NSG
6	Secretary, R&AW	26 September 1986	December 2014	
7	Vacant	December 2014	March 2015	Post was kept vacant during tenure of Arvind Saxena as Special Secretary, ARC
8	Secretary, R&AW	March 2015	Till date	

=== Principal Director, DGS ===
Incumbents of this post ran the DGS organisation since 1974 under overall command of Secretary (R).

Sr No.	Name	From	Till	Remarks
1	R. N. Manickam, IPS	30 November 1974	30 June 1977	formerly, IGP, Madras State
2	Pitri Sharan Raturi, IPS	12 July 1977	31 March 1979	
3	Thiruvalanchuly Muthukrishna Ayyar Subramaniam, IPS	31 March 1979	3 February 1982	He was IB's liaison officer with CIA and USAF at Agra air base, in the initial days of ARC, before its formal creation.
4	Sudarshan Singh Bajwa, IPS	3 February 1982	31 August 1982	formerly, IGP, Haryana
5	Onkar Singh, IPS	31 August 1982	31 October 1982	
6	Ram Tekchand Nagrani, RAS	12 September 1983	31 January 1986	originally IPS (04RR). Promoted to Director General (Security). Concurrently, founder DG of NSG
7	Ramchandar Swaminathan, RAS	23 February 1988	31 July 1990	originally IPS (07RR). Later, Vice-President, Chennai Centre for China Studies
8	Hari Baboo Johri, IPS	31 July 1990	30 April 1991	
9	Natesan Narasimhan, RAS	27 May 1991	31 July 1991	originally IPS (10RR). Promoted to DG (Security) and Secretary (R)
10	A. P. Verma, RAS	7 October 1991	31 October 1991	originally IPS (12RR)
11	N. Natarajan, IPS	1 November 1991	31 December 1992	
12	Kalyan Kumar Mitra, RAS	30 April 1993	28 February 1995	originally IPS (13RR).
13	S. Gopal, RAS	1 March 1995	29 September 1996	originally IPS (14RR). Later, Sir Ashutosh Mukherjee Visiting Chair Professor, National Institute of Advanced Studies. Currently member of the Constitutional Conduct Group, a group of former civil servants, with the motto of Speaking Truth to Power.
14	Rajendra Mohan, IPS	30 September 1996	30 September 1997	
15	Nachhattar Singh Sandhu, IPS	26 October 1999	15 January 2001	re-designated as Director General, SSB

=== Special Secretary, ARC ===
Sr No.	Name	From	Till	Remarks
1	Ravinder Singh Bedi, RAS	2001	2003	originally of the Army, then RAS-1966. Later, founder Chairman of NTRO
2	Amar Bhushan, RAS	2003	31 January 2005	originally IPS (20RR). Also had charge of Administration and Counter-Intelligence & Security (CIS) wings of R&AW. During his tenure as head of CIS, Rabinder Singh, a joint secretary in R&AW, managed to defect to the USA. Also known as a thriller writer, has authored The Spymaster series and other novels.
3	Ajai Singh, RAS	2005	2008	originally IPS (23RR)
4	Sanjeev Kumar Tripathi, RAS	2008	30 December 2010	originally IPS (25RR). Promoted to Secretary, R&AW and DG (Security)
5	Avadhesh Behari Mathur, IPS	December 2010	December 2011	Promoted to Secretary (Security). Later, UNMIK Head of Office, Mitrovica, Kosovo, Member, National Security Advisory Board and emeritus resource faculty, Rashtriya Raksha University
6	Krishan Varma, RAS	December 2011	30 September 2012	later, emeritus resource faculty, Rashtriya Raksha University, member, Advisory Council, Global Counter Terrorism Council, Impulse Model Policy Advisor India to the Impulse NGO Network, member, Board of Advisors, Usanas Foundation and Trustee, Foundation for Non-violent Alternatives.
7	Amitabh Mathur, RAS	2012	2014	originally IPS (30RR). Later, Special Adviser, Ministry of Home Affairs, and founding partner of DeepStrat LLP, a New Delhi-based think tank and strategic consultancy. Currently member of the Constitutional Conduct Group, a group of former civil servants, with the motto of Speaking Truth to Power.
8	Arvind Saxena, RAS	December 2014	May 2015	originally IPoS (1978). Later, Chairman, UPSC
9	Anil Kumar Dhasmana, IPS	2015	31 December 2016	Promoted to Secretary (R) and DG (Security). Later, Chairman, NTRO
10	Kumaresan Ilango, RAS	2017	28 February 2019	originally IPS (35RR). Was recalled as station chief of R&AW from Colombo in 2015 amid accusation of meddling in the 2015 Sri Lanka presidential election.
11	R. Kumar, RAS	2019	30 November 2020	originally IA&AS (1984)
12	Rajesh Mishra, IPoS (1985)	2020	28 February 2021	
13	Maruti Narayan Sridhar Rao, IPoS (1985)	2021	31 October 2022	

== Rank structure ==
Level of Pay Matrix	Designations
17	Director General (Security)
17	Director, ARC (in the rank of Special Secretary)
15	Adviser (Technical), Adviser (Imagery Analysis), ARC (in the rank of Additional Secretary)
14	Operations Manager, ARC (air vice marshal); Joint Director, ARC; Inspector General, SFF
13A	Chief Pilot, ARC (air commodore); Commandant, Establishment 22, SFF; Deputy Director, SFF (brigadier)
13	Deputy Director, ARC
12A	Assistant Director, SFF (lieutenant colonel)
12	Joint Deputy Director, ARC
11	Assistant Director, ARC; Technical Officer, ARC
10	Senior Field Officer, ARC/SFF; Assistant Technical Officer, ARC
8	Field Officer, ARC/SFF
6	Deputy Field Officer, ARC/SFF
5	Assistant Field Officer, ARC/SFF
4	Senior Field Assistant, ARC/SFF
3	Field Assistant, ARC/SFF

Note: Combatised personnel of SFF have pay parity with the Army, vide Cabinet Secretariat Order dated 16.10.2009; pension & pensionary benefits to SFF personnel are also at par with Indian Army for Group 'Y' 'Personnel Below Officer Rank' (PBORs). In addition, army personnel on deputation to Special Group (4 Vikas) of SFF get special force allowance (SFA) and para pay.
