= A. K. Dave =

Indian Imperial Police

Anandbhai Karunashankar Dave (13 January 1921 – 16 November 2004) was an Indian Imperial Police officer who served as Joint Director of the Intelligence Bureau and Director of the Aviation Research Centre. After premature retirement, he became the founder CEO of the Welcome Group of Hotels of ITC, chairman of Quality Inns (India) and later, chairman and managing director of India Tourism Development Corporation and Ashok Group of Hotels.

== Early life ==
Dave was educated at Model High School, Jabalpur and got his B.Sc. from the College of Science, Nagpur. He got appointed to the I.P. on 24 February 1942 after competitive examination and served as district superintendent of police and in other posts in various districts of the then Central Provinces and Berar. On his first central deputation, Dave got appointed as an Officer on Special Duty in the Ministry of External Affairs on 9 September 1953 and became adviser to the Neutral Nations Repatriation Commission. He went on his second central deputation on 12 February 1954.

== Central Service ==
Dave had joined the Intelligence Bureau as Joint Deputy Director and was promoted to Deputy Director on 23 March 1957. He became the IB's premier expert on China and Tibet and was the first Indian officer to meet the Dalai Lama, when the latter went into exile in 1959. In mid-1966, he became the Director of the Aviation Research Centre, India's aerial and technical intelligence agency, succeeding R. N. Kao. In 1965, there was a joint CIA-IB-ARC mountaineering expedition to place a nuclear-powered telemetry relay listening device on Mount Nanda Devi, which failed due to a severe blizzard. After Dave became ARC chief, another attempt was made by the team under his supervision to place the relay on Mount Nanda Kot, which succeeded. Team leader of the expedition was Navy Captain Mohan Singh Kohli, who recalled how B. N. Mullik [who was overall in-charge despite having recently retired from the post of DG (Security) (under whom ARC came)], and A. K. Dave, Director of ARC, flew to the Base Camp to personally congratulate the team.

When the IB was split in 1968 to create R&AW, IB chief M. M. L. Hooja and ARC chief Dave tried their best to prevent it, but failed. Thereafter, in early 1969, Dave left ARC and came back to the IB. He became Hooja's second-in-command and was expected to succeed him. But when Hooja retired in 1971, Atmaram Jayaram, a friend of Kao, was made DIB, superseding Dave. Dave was transferred as Director, National Police Academy, Mount Abu (now in Hyderabad). Dave, instead of joining the new assignment, took premature retirement and joined the ITC. In later years, he became the founder president of the Association of Retired Senior IPS Officers, and wrote the book, The Real Story of China's War on India, 1962.

== Work in the Hotel Industry ==
On joining ITC, Dave became chief of its hotels division and went on to create the Welcome Group of Hotels. He also started the Indian franchise of the Quality Inn group of hotels of Choice Hotels International. In 1977, Dave was appointed chairman and managing director of India Tourism Development Corporation and headed the Ashok Group of Hotels. With his son, Uttam, he founded AK Dave & Associates, India's first full service tourism and hospitality consulting practice.

Preceded by R. N. Kao	Director, Aviation Research Centre; 1966–1969	Succeeded by R. N. Manickam
