= P. N. Kaul =

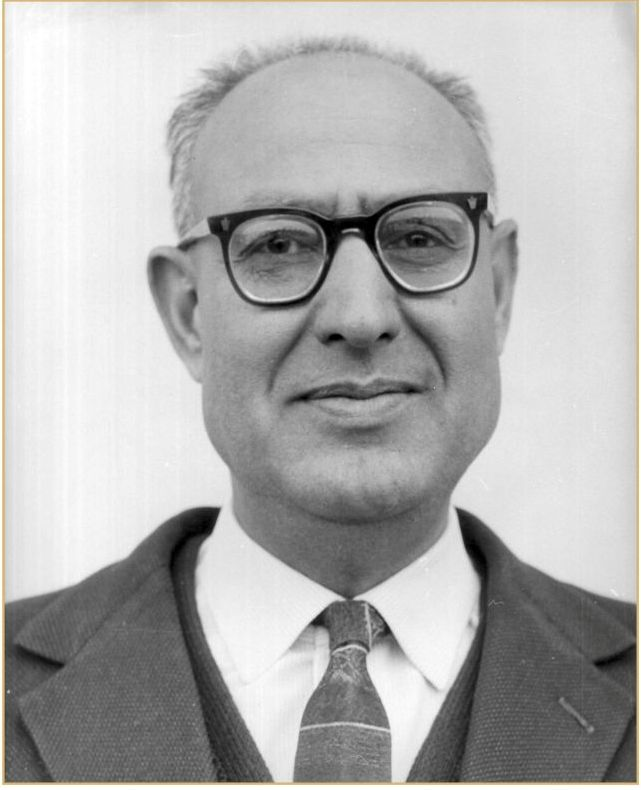

Prem Nath Kaul (born 1916) was an officer of the Indian Army and later of the Indian Frontier Administrative Service, later merged into the Indian Administrative Service. He had served as the Consul-General of India in Lhasa before the 1962 Sino-Indian War, Director of Special Service Bureau (now Sashastra Seema Bal) and Director of the Indian Cooperation Mission, Nepal.

== Service in Army ==
As detailed in his memoirs, Frontier Callings (1976), Kaul was born in Baramulla and graduated from Srinagar with a law degree. He joined the British Indian Army in November 1941, and got posted in the wartime-raised 15th battalion of the Rajput Regiment, then stationed in Quetta. He got posted in Eastern Command HQ in 1946 and functioned as judge advocate. In 1948, he was sent to Kashmir, in the temporary rank of acting lieutenant colonel, to raise and command militia battalions. In 1949, he went to Leh, to command and expand, by recruitment, the 7th battalion of J&K Militia, then called Nubra Guards. While posted here, he witnessed the mass exodus of the Uyghur Muslim refugees from Sinkiang, after taking over of that province by communist China; the exodus included the consul-general of India at Kashgar. Kaul's memoirs is one of the rare references to the closure of India's Kashgar consulate.

== Service in NEFA ==
In 1951, Kaul was transferred from infantry to artillery and posted as a major in the 14th Medium Regiment, near Amritsar. In 1953, the government came up with the Indian Frontier Administration Service for administering the North-East Frontier Agency. Officers from various services, including the armed forces, were chosen for it. Kaul was transferred to this service as Political Officer on 19 January 1954. At that time, NEFA was divided into six frontier divisions (now districts), each administered by a political officer (now deputy commissioner), who had powers of a sessions judge in addition to executive powers, due to the lack of a judicial set-up there. Kaul got posted in Kameng division, headquartered at Bomdila. While posted in Siang division, Kaul dealt with the aftermath of the 1953 Achingmori incident.

== Service in Tibet ==
In 1959, after a short stint in Delhi, six months after emigration of the 14th Dalai Lama to India, Kaul was posted in Lhasa as India's Consul-General. Tibet, at that time, was going through tumultuous times, due to Chinese occupation and large-scale exodus of the locals. Kaul has described this "repressive state", albeit circumspectly. The small community of Tibetan Muslims were in particular jeopardy. Although the Indian response to their asylum was initially lukewarm, ultimately India agreed to take them as Indian nationals and Kaul, as head of the Indian Mission, facilitated to get them domiciled in Kashmir.

== Service in SSB ==
Kaul returned from Lhasa in November 1961 and got posted as Deputy Secretary (Tibetan Refugees) in the Ministry of External Affairs. In 1965, he was transferred to the Emergency Affairs II (EA-II) cell of the Cabinet Secretariat. This cell used to deal with the Directorate General of Security, comprising Special Service Bureau, Aviation Research Centre and Special Frontier Force. R&AW, which would control this outfit, was still in the future. While working in EA-II cell, in early 1966, Kaul found "an interesting field assignment", to quote his memoirs, and got posted as Divisional Organiser of SSB in Ranikhet. From 24 October 1968 to 20 April 1972, Kaul was Director of SSB. However, due to the covert nature of SSB at the time, Kaul mentions the organisation by the innovative name, Border Home Guards, and largely skips over the operational details. For example, Kaul's tenure as director coincided with the Bangladesh War, when the SSB got engaged in training the Mukti Bahini and Mujib Bahini in guerrilla warfare, running the Bangla Desh Radio, etc.

== Entry into IAS ==
On 1 January 1968, the Indian Frontier Administrative Service got disbanded; officers seconded from IPS and other All-India or central services were sent back to their parent cadres; and the rest of the cadre, including the Armed Forces officers, was merged with the Delhi-Himachal Pradesh cadre of the Indian Administrative Service to create the Union Territory cadre (today's AGMUT cadre) of IAS. A court case was filed in the Delhi High Court against this creation of the UT cadre; the court issued notice to the 36 IFAS beneficiaries, including Kaul (then in SSB). Later, the High Court quashed this merger by judgment dated 25 September 1969, which was reversed by the Supreme Court by judgment dated 28 April 1976. Therefore, from 1969 to 1976, the matter of Kaul's cadre was sub judice, so he could not mention his cadre (IFAS or IAS) after his name during this time.

== Service in Nepal ==
India had set up the Indian Aid Mission in Kathmandu in 1954, to support the various development projects across Nepal, which was renamed as Indian Cooperation Mission in 1966. From May 1972 to early 1976, Kaul served as Director of this Mission. During his tenure, he facilitated various Indian support schemes for Nepal, including one on the Trishuli Hydel Project.

== Family ==
As mentioned in his memoirs, Kaul's parents were Tota Kaul and Gunwanti Kaul. His wife's name was Gaurishwari Kaul. Among his brothers, the eldest, Radhey Nath Kaul was a revolutionary; the second, Triloki Nath Kaul was a diplomat and had served as Indian Ambassador to USA and India's Foreign Secretary; the youngest, Hriday Nath Kaul, was a lieutenant general and served as Deputy Chief of the Army Staff and chief of the Western Command.

Preceded by Maj. S. L. Chibber, IFAS	Consul-General of India, Lhasa; 1959–1961	Succeeded by Arvind Ram Deo, IFS

Preceded by Dilip Kumar Bhattacharya, IAS	Divisional Organiser, Uttar Pradesh Division, SSB; 1966–1968	Succeeded by

Preceded by Sardar Balbir Singh, I.P.	Director, Special Service Bureau; 1968–1972	Succeeded by P. S. Raturi, IPS

Preceded by Rajeshwar Prasad, IAS	Director, Indian Cooperation Mission, Nepal; 1972–1976	Succeeded by Sushil Swarup Varma, IAS
