= List of Rashtrasant Tukadoji Maharaj Nagpur University people =

This is a list of notable alumni and faculty of the Rashtrasant Tukadoji Maharaj Nagpur University, formerly knnown as Nagpur University established in 1923.

== Notable alumni ==
=== Academia, Science and Technology ===
- B. D. Kulkarni, chemical reaction engineer, Shanti Swarup Bhatnagar Prize recipient
- Pranawachandra Deshmukh, physicist, educator, author of Physics text books, and known for his contribution to theoretical atomic physics.
- Damaraju Raghavarao, Indian-born statistician known for his contributions in design of experiments
- Dipshikha Chakravortty, microbiologist, N-Bios laureate
- Prafullachandra Vishnu Sane, molecular biologist, Shanti Swarup Bhatnagar Prize recipient
- Ramesh Jain, scientist, professor and entrepreneur in the field of Computer Science
- Shekhar C. Mande, Shanti Swaroop Bhatnagar award-winning scientist in the field of x-ray crystallography and biophysics

=== Arts and Literature ===
- Dhanashree Halbe, translator, poet, and children's author
- Eknath Easwaran, internationally known & respected spiritual teacher
- Harishankar Parsai (1924–1995), noted Hindi writer and satirist
- Indra Bahadur Khare (16 Dec 1922 – 13 April 1953), Hindi Poet and writer
- Vishnu Bhikaji Kolte (1908–1998), noted Marathi writer and former Vice Chancellor, Nagpur University

=== Business and Law ===
- Chandrashekhar Shankar Dharmadhikari, Padma Bhushan, Judge and Indian Independence activist
- Madhukar Narhar Chandurkar, Chief Justice of Indian High Courts
- Justice Mohammad Hidayatullah, Vice President of India & Former Chief Justice of India
- Justice Sharad Arvind Bobde, 47th Chief Justice of India
- Wasudev Waman Patankar advocate, noted Marathi Shayari writer
- Harish Salve Former Solicitor General of India
- Chief Justice Bhushan Ramkrishna Gavai,52nd Chief Justice of India.

=== Athletics and Sports ===
- Umesh Yadav, a cricketer who currently plays for Vidarbha cricket team, Indian national team and Royal Challengers Bangalore in the Indian Premier League

=== Film, Television and Theater ===
- Sonu Sood, Bollywood film actor
- Ulhas Kashalkar (b. 1955), noted Hindustani classical vocalist
- Ashish Dixit Indian Film/ Television Actor.

=== Politics ===
- Datta Meghe, MP
- Devendra Fadnavis, Chief Minister of Maharashtra
- Jogendra Kawade, Member of parliament and Maharashtra Legislative Council
- Marotrao Kowase, MP from Gadchiroli-Chimur
- Mukul Wasnik, General Secretary, Indian National Congress, and Union Minister
- Nitin Gadkari, MP from Nagpur and Union minister
- P. V. Narasimha Rao, Former Prime Minister of India
- Shantaram Potdukhe, former Member of Parliament & Union Minister of State, finance
- Shrikant Jichkar, former member of the Indian National Congress
- Swati Dandekar, United States politician, Iowa House of Representatives
- Vilas Muttemwar, former MP from Nagpur

=== Miscellaneous ===
- Eknath Ranade, founder of Vivekananda Kendra
- K. Jayakumar, senior Indian Administrative Service (IAS) officer from Kerala
- Ryder Devapriam, former bishop of the Nandyal Diocese the Church of South India
- Amit Telang, Diplomat, a senior Indian Foreign Service officer and alumni of Government Medical College, Nagpur
- A. K. Dave, I.P., Director of Aviation Research Centre, later founder CEO of ITC Welcom Hotels, CMD of ITDC & Ashok Group of hotels
