= Pitri Sharan Raturi =

Officer of Indian Army and Police

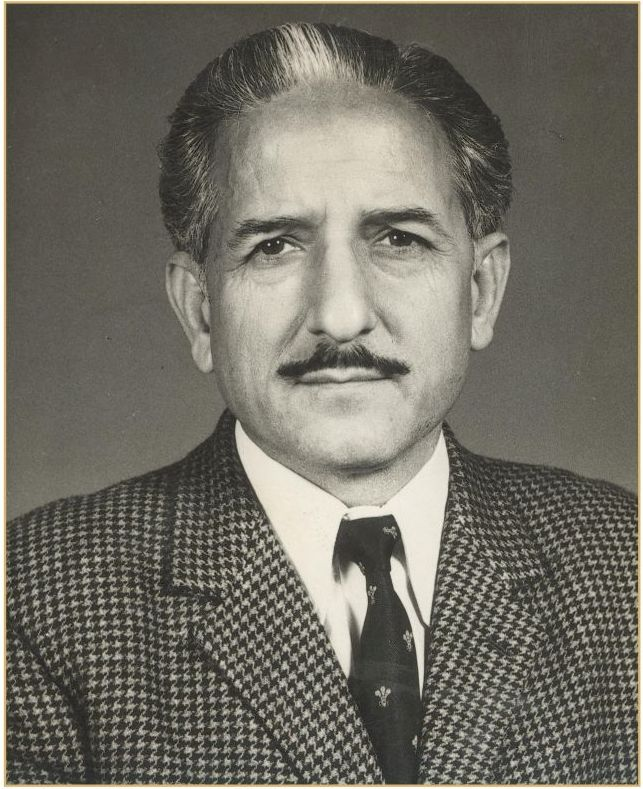

Pitri Sharan Raturi (1920–1991) was an officer of the Indian National Army and later, of the Indian Police Service. He commanded the 1st battalion of the INA's 1st Guerrilla Regiment (also called Bose Brigade or Subhas Brigade) which participated in the battle of the Kaladan River valley in March–April 1944 against the 81st (West Africa) Division of the XV British Corps and forcing retreat of the British forces, entered India to occupy Mowdok, near Chittagong (now in the Bandarban District of Bangladesh). After the war, Raturi joined the IPS and retired as Principal Director in the Directorate General of Security, the co-agency of the Research and Analysis Wing. Post-retirement, he served in an honorary capacity as Officer on Special Duty (INA) in the Ministry of Home Affairs.

== Early life ==
Raturi was born on 25 September 1920 in Tehri Garhwal district of what is now Uttarakhand in a Sarola Brahmin family. He was educated at Prince of Wales Royal Indian Military College and Indian Military Academy, Dehradun. On induction into the British Indian Army, he was posted in the newly raised 5th battalion of the 18th Royal Garhwal Rifles. In January 1942, this unit was deployed at Muar Front as part of the 45th Indian Infantry Brigade on the western coast of Malaya against Japanese Imperial Guards Battalion. Faced with Japanese tanks, without any air support or tanks of their own, the battalion suffered heavy casualties, including most of its officers. Raturi, then a captain, was taken as a POW. Thereafter he opted to join the INA. At that time, Field Marshal Terauchi, commander of Japan's Southern Army Command, was of the opinion that INA was to be used in support and intelligence roles only, leaving the real fighting to the Japanese troops. A compromise was reached with Subhas Chandra Bose that only one regiment of INA would be deployed in the frontline, as an experiment, to test their abilities. So the best troops of the INA were selected to create a new regiment, the 1st Guerrilla Regiment (better known as Subhas Brigade), under command of Shah Nawaz Khan, then lieutenant colonel. This consisted of three battalions and Raturi, raised to a major, was put in command of the 1st battalion.

== Battle of the Kaladan Valley ==
The 1st battalion of the Subhas Brigade was assigned to operate in the Kaladan Valley, east of Buthidaung, and advance northwards to Taung Bazar, in conjunction with the Japanese 55th Division. Accordingly, the battalion went from Rangoon to Prome by train; then 100 miles to Taungup on foot; and another 150 miles to Myoe Haung on foot. After suffering casualties due to enemy air attacks, the battalion eventually reached Kyauktaw in mid-March 1944 and formed their base. At that time, the West African Division of the British Army was advancing from the West side of the Kaladan river, with intent to cross over to the east bank and establish a brigade at Tetma, a few miles north of Kaladan village, so as to link up and guard the junction of two important link roads, being constructed on both banks of the river. Major Raturi's job was to prevent this division from crossing over. But when Raturi reached Tetma with his three companies, the West Africans had already formed their base in fortified hills on the east bank. By encircling the enemy through thick bamboo forests, Raturi took over Tetma, both lower and upper, by launching a sudden and fierce attack. Thereafter he moved further up and launched a fixed bayonet attack on the enemy's hilly base during the night. After a fierce hand-to-hand combat, the British troops were forced to retreat to the west bank by dawn. Thereafter the Japanese troops reached with reinforcement and the 1st battalion moved further and captured the Indian port of Mowdok in early May. In view of shortage of rations and supply and impending British counter-attack, the Japanese forces decided to withdraw. So Raturi also had to withdraw, leaving one company as rear guard, and the Japanese placed one of their platoons under command of this INA company, the first time that Japanese troops were placed under command of a foreign officer. After this battle, the Japanese C-in-C in Burma went to Subhas Bose, and bowing before him, admitted their earlier misconception about the INA and acknowledged the valour of the INA troops. Raturi was awarded Sardar-e-Jung and was promoted to lieutenant colonel.

== Police Service ==
After the surrender of Japan, Raturi was interrogated in the Red Fort. The INA soldiers were put on trial by the British Army but had to be released due to national unrest in India and naval mutiny. After release, he got involved in the anti-monarchy movement in the Tehri Garhwal Princely State, his home state, and also presided over a meeting involving Congress members, ex-INA members and state assembly (Praja Mandal) members, at Kotdwar, on 5-6 January 1947. Thereafter Raturi joined the Provincial Police Service of the United Provinces and was appointed in the IPS under the Emergency Recruitment Scheme on 1 October 1949 with year of allotment in 1948. After holding various posts in the United Provinces, he went on central deputation. He served as Director of the Special Service Bureau (now Sashastra Seema Bal), a covert force created under the Directorate General of Security after the China War of 1962, for underground resistance movement in the border belt in the event of another such war. Raturi was director of SSB from 28 June 1972 to 11 July 1977, after which he was promoted to Principal Director, DGS (having oversight on ARC and SFF) and served as such from 12 July 1977 to 31 March 1979.

== Post-retirement ==
After retirement, Raturi was appointed, in an honorary capacity, as Officer on Special Duty (INA) in the Ministry of Home Affairs, on an annual extension basis from 11 October 1979 to 7 June 1987.

Preceded by P. N. Kaul	Director, Special Service Bureau; 1972–1977	Succeeded by T. M. Subramaniam

Preceded by R. N. Manickam	Principal Director, Directorate General of Security; 1977–1979	Succeeded by T. M. Subramaniam
