= M. M. L. Hooja =

Police and intelligence officer in British India

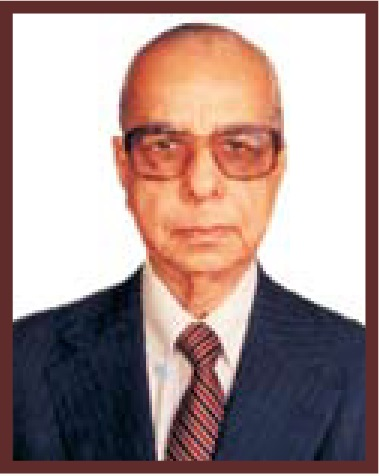

Madan Mohan Lal Hooja (5 September 1914 – 6 April 1990) was an Indian Imperial Police officer who became Director General of Security and Director of the Intelligence Bureau.

== Early life ==
Hooja was educated at St. Xavier's School and St. Xavier's College, Calcutta. He was appointed to the Bengal (later West Bengal) cadre of the I.P. on 18 March 1939 through competitive examination. After serving at various places of undivided Bengal, lastly as Special SP of the Intelligence Branch, he went on central deputation on 18 June 1947 and joined the I.B.

== Central Service ==
In the I.B., Hooja became Joint Director on 18 April 1960. He became the No. 2 of B. N. Mullik, Director of IB, and was expected to succeed him. But when Mullik retired in 1964, Sharda Prasad Verma, an IG of Bihar, was appointed as DIB. Mullick, as DIB, had raised three covert organisations in 1963: Special Service Bureau (now Sashastra Seema Bal), Aviation Research Centre and Special Frontier Force. After retirement, Mullick got re-employed as Director General of Security, with command over these three organisations. After Mullik's final retirement, Hooja became DG (Security) on 1 August 1966. When Verma went on pre-retirement leave, Hooja became DIB on 15 January 1968. Hooja was transferred out of the I.B. in November 1971 as permanent vice-chairman of the Committee on Police Training, commonly called Gore Committee and retired from the same on 31 December 1972. During his tenure as Director, Hooja had to bear with the break-up of the I.B. when R&AW was carved out of it over Hooja's strenuous protests and non-cooperation and foreign intelligence was removed from the purview of the I.B.

== Post-retirement ==
After retirement, Hooja went to Calcutta where he worked as director of B. N. Elias & Company for 15 years. During this time, he had also worked as a member of the L. P. Singh Committee, set up by the Janata Party government to probe the misuse of I.B. and C.B.I. during the Emergency and suggest remedial measures.

Government offices
| Preceded by B. N. Mullik | Director General of Security; 1966–1968 | Succeeded by Sardar Balbir Singh |
| Preceded by S. P. Verma | Director of the Intelligence Bureau; 1968–1971 | Succeeded by Atma Jayaram |
