= Special Group (India) =

Confidential special operations forces

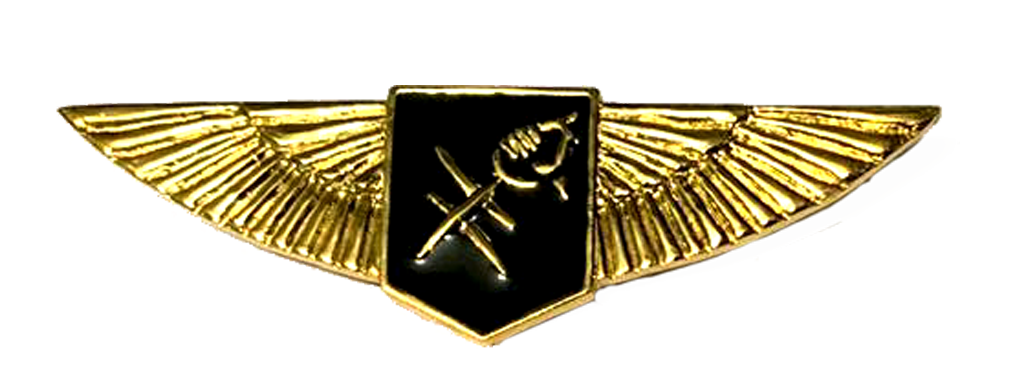
- Special Group insignia
- Active: 1981–present
- Country: India
- Allegiance: Research & Analysis Wing (R&AW)
- Branch: Cabinet Secretariat
- Type: Special Forces
- Size: 4 squadrons (Each consisting of 100 operatives)
- Headquarters: Sarsawa AFS, Uttar Pradesh
- Nickname: The Mavericks

The Special Group (SG) is the clandestine operations unit of Cabinet Secretariat (Cabinet Secretariat). It is responsible for covert and paramilitary operations and is known as 4 Vikas, 22 SF and 22 SG. (Note: The Special Group is different from the Vikas battalions of the Special Frontier Force; the name "4 Vikas" was given to it to create confusion. The designation of "22 SF" was given to the SG when it was deployed in Jammu and Kashmir (for counter-insurgency operations) to conceal the real name of the unit; obituaries for SG personnel who died carried this name. The number 22 in this designation is in succession with the number 21 in Indian Army‘s 21 Para (SF).) Its responsibilities include conducting operations with which the Indian Armed Forces may not wish to be overtly associated.

Established in 1981, it was raised in the following year under Project Sunray. Its existence was previously unknown to the public. There are a total of four SG squadrons, with each squadron consisting of four troops and each troop consisting of 25 personnel. Each troop has a specialized skill-set. SG draws its personnel from all the branches of Indian Armed Forces, with 20-30% being drawn from the Special forces. The Commanding Officer of the unit is always a Special Forces officer.

== History ==
=== Origins ===
The Special Group was created in 1981 as a classified unit under Research and Analysis Wing tasked with undertaking covert operations. The Directorate General of Security, which was a confidential organisation created with assistance from the CIA after the Sino-Indian War of 1962, was put under the control of R&AW in 1968. In 1982, Project Sunray was initiated by the Directorate, under which an officer from the Para SF of the Indian Army was tasked with raising a unit comprising 250 personnel. In early 1983, a group of six personnel were sent to a confidential military base in Israel. There they received training from a specialist team of Mossad for a few weeks. This team, which had earlier rescued hostages from Uganda's Entebbe airport with some assistance from R&AW, was composed of commandos from the Sayeret Matkal. (Note: Initially, the Special Group contemplated sending its officers to train with the British Special Air Service at the facility located in Hereford; SG made this proposal after its officers visited that facility. However, the Indian government rejected this proposal; SG later decided to stick to its own training facility.)

The original mandate of the SG was similar to that of the British Special Air Service and included counterterrorism and hostage rescue. However, this mandate was later transferred to the National Security Guard. The current mandate of the SG is not fully known.

=== Security at International summits in 1983 ===
The Non-Aligned Movement summit and Commonwealth Heads of Government Meeting in 1983 was conducted under the direct supervision of the SG to prevent any untoward event. The Non-Aligned summit was particularly important since it would cement India's position as the leader of the movement.

=== Operation Sundown ===
Operation Sundown was the code name of a covert plan in which the Special Group was to abduct Sikh extremist leader Jarnail Singh Bhindranwale from Guru Nanak Niwas in the Golden Temple complex, Amritsar. A unit was formed to prepare for Operation Sundown in the Sarsawa Air Force Base in Uttar Pradesh. In December 1983, an officer from the Counter-Revolutionary Warfare Wing of the British Special Air Service arrived in India to provide advice regarding the plan. Extensive rehearsals were also carried out.

The operation was never started due to the then Prime Minister of India Indira Gandhi's rejection on religious grounds; the operation may have hurt the religious sentiments of the Sikh people. In addition there was a risk of numerous civilian casualties as a collateral damage of the operation.

Other options such as negotiations subsequently failed and the law and order situation in Punjab continued to deteriorate.

=== Operation Blue Star ===
External image
- Two Special Group officers at the Golden Temple during Operation Blue Star. Note the distinctive black uniforms and the damaged structure in the background.

By the end of 1983, the security situation in Punjab was worsening due to the erupting separatist militancy. Operation Blue Star was the code name of the Indian military action carried out between 1 and 8 June 1984 to remove militant religious leader Jarnail Singh Bhindranwale and his followers from the buildings of the Harmandir Sahib (Golden Temple) complex in Amritsar, Punjab. A few days before the operation began, the Special Group arrived in Amritsar. The Special Group was tasked to create an executable plan for this.

A senior officer from the British Special Air Service was secretly recruited to provide advice for this plan to the SG, after being cleared by then British PM Margaret Thatcher. A group of SG personnel clad in black uniforms, armed with AK-47 rifles and Night vision goggles, began the assault on 6 June 1984.

The Special Group was responsible for the eventual death of Jarnail Singh Bhindranwale and Shabeg Singh during Operation Blue Star, despite the 1 Para (SF) claiming credit for it. This is associated with the fact that they were shot dead using AK-47 rifles. Such rifles, which were purchased secretly from Europe, were present exclusively with the SG at that time.

=== Prime Ministerial security till 1985 ===
In the aftermath of the assassination of Prime Minister Indira Gandhi in 1984, SG personnel provided security to the Prime Minister of India until the creation of the Special Protection Group in 1985.

=== Black operations ===
The Special Group has undertaken black operations outside India. In the late 1980s, it rescued a political prisoner in Bangladesh after being ordered to do so by the Prime Minister of India. After a civil war started in Sri Lanka in 1983, India used it as an opportunity to curtail foreign influence in the country; India provided training and equipment to the militant groups fighting in the war. The Special Group was involved in providing training assistance to the Liberation Tigers of Tamil Eelam, the most prominent militant group.

=== Planned raid near Kahuta nuclear facility ===
During the 1999 Kargil war, the Indian government had planned a raid near the Kahuta nuclear facility in Pakistan and had asked the Special Group to prepare for it. Ultimately, however, the raid was called off.

=== Planned operation in Kandahar, Afghanistan ===
When the Indian Airlines flight 814 was forced by hijackers to land in Kandahar, Afghanistan, in December 1999 the SG was instructed to be ready for a potential rescue effort. Their mission was to clear a path for the National Security Guard to enable them to reach the aircraft and conduct an anti-hijacking operation. The plan entailed eliminating the members of the Taliban in the vicinity of the aircraft. However, 'public pressure' eventually forced the BJP led Indian government to scrap the plan. The government agreed to the demand of the hijackers to swap imprisoned militants in exchange for the civilian passengers.

=== Counter-insurgency operations in Kashmir ===
The Special Group are known to be involved in the ongoing counter-insurgency operations in the Jammu and Kashmir region across the Line of Control.

== Overview ==
=== Organisation ===
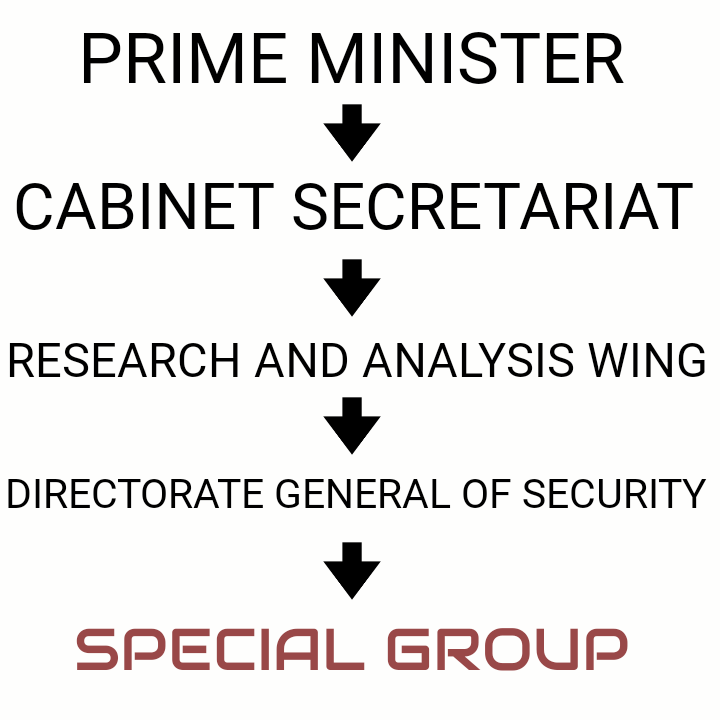
A diagram showing the command structure of SG

The Special Group functions under the Directorate General of Security (DG Security) of Research and Analysis Wing (RAW), which is India's foreign intelligence agency. The unit serves under the command of the prime minister through the Cabinet Secretariat. Within RAW, the Secretary (Research) is responsible for the Special Group.

The SG is headquartered at Sarsawa in Uttar Pradesh. Its personnel are volunteers recruited from all the branches of the Indian Armed Forces, primarily from the Special Forces. After serving in the SG on deputation, its personnel return to their original units. SG personnel are distributed in three to four companies. An SG team is kept on high alert for contingencies round the clock. There are a total of four SG squadrons, with each squadron consisting of four troops. Each troop has a specialized skill-set. The SG has dedicated branches specialising in intelligence gathering, operational planning, communications and training.

=== Responsibilities ===
The responsibilities of the Special Group includes clandestine intelligence operations and covert operations, with which the Government of India may not wish to be overtly associated. The SG is also responsible for developing tactics and training procedures for other special forces of India.

=== Training and equipment ===
The Special Group is considered to be a capably trained counter-terrorism unit of India and is considered to be very well equipped. The SG is reportedly provided with the newest equipment and it uses the transport aircraft of the Aviation Research Centre.

== See also ==
- Special Forces of India
- Covert Action Division, the Pakistani ISI's version of the Special Group
