= Government Arts College, Coimbatore =

General Degree college in City of Coimbatore

Coordinates: 10°59′54.6″N 76°58′18.84″E

Government Arts College (AUTONOMOUS)
- Motto: Sapere Aude
- Motto in English: Dare to be wise
- Type: Government co-educational autonomous
- Established: 1852; 174 years ago
- Affiliations: Bharathiar University
- Principal: Dr.M.R.YEZHILI. M.A., M.Phil., Ph.D.,
- Location: Coimbatore, Tamil Nadu, India
- Campus: 13.6 acres (5.5 ha)
- Website: gacbe.ac.in

Government Arts College is an autonomous institution located in Coimbatore, Tamil Nadu. It is a liberal arts college affiliated to the Bharathiar University.

College rankings

General – India
- NIRF (Colleges) (2021): 42

== History ==
Government Arts College started as an Anglo-vernacular school in 1852. It became a first-grade college in 1870 and almost a century later, a post-graduate college in 1964, under the Madras University.

The college blazon was adopted as early as 1868 by then Principal C. C. Flanagan. After that it changed, in 1953 as a part of the centenary year celebration and in 1999 after the college was accredited, with four stars.

== Academic Programmes ==
The college offers undergraduates and postgraduate programmes in arts and science affiliated to the Bharathiar University. It has been accredited by NAAC with an A Grade (CGPA 3.49)

== Rankings ==
The college is ranked 67th among colleges in India by the National Institutional Ranking Framework (NIRF) in 2024.

== Notable alumni ==
- Puviarasu, Tamil Poet
- Raghuvaran, actor
- Manivannan, Actor and Director
- Sathyaraj, Actor
- Ranjith, Actor
- Jeeva, Lawyer, Artist
- R. V. Udayakumar, Actor and Director
- R. N. Manickam, Officer, Indian Police Service
- P. Nagarajan, Member of Parliament
