= Atma Jayaram =

- Born: 31 August 1915; Colombo, Ceylon
- Died: 19 March 1990 (aged 74); Hyderabad, Andhra Pradesh, India
- Education: Pembroke College, University of Cambridge; Ceylon University College; Trinity College, Kandy
- Occupation: Spymaster
- Spouse: Sushila Jayaram
- Children: Athmaram Katakam and Asoka Katakam
- Parent: Dr. T.K. Jayaram
- Awards: President's Police Medal; Police Medal; Indian Independence Medal
- Espionage activity
- Allegiance: British India (till 1947); India (after 1947)
- Service branch: Indian Police Service; Intelligence Bureau
- Service years: 1940-1975
- Rank: Director of the Intelligence Bureau
- Operations: Operation Polo, 1948; Sino-Indian War, 1962; Indo-Pakistani War of 1965; Bangladesh Liberation War, 1971; Emergency, 1975

Atma Jayaram (31 August 1915 – 19 March 1990) was the Director of the Indian Intelligence Bureau between November 1971 to August 1975. His tenure was during one of the most turbulent political periods of modern India. He served under then Prime Minister Indira Gandhi.

== Early life ==
Born in Colombo to Dr. T. Katakam Jayaram (1881–1940), young Atma had a privileged upbringing. Dr. Jayaram was one of the few licensed medical practitioners of the time and was fairly wealthy, however he began life from a poor family. He was married at the end of the 19th century, and his wife died shortly after giving birth to a daughter. His subsequent marriage in 1912-1913 brought him two sons and a daughter, Atma being the younger of the two brothers.

Atma's younger sister and mother died before the age of five. Atma and his brother Dayaram were educated at some of Ceylon's (Sri Lanka) most well known institutions.

Atma Jayaram studied at Trinity College, Kandy, graduating in 1932. He pursued a degree in science at the Ceylon University College and graduated in 1935. Upon finishing his academics, he received admission into the Cavendish Laboratory at the University of Cambridge studying physics in 1936. During his three-year Tripos, he attended Pembroke College. He studied under Lord Ernest Rutherford, the Nobel Prize Laureate who had gained acclaim for the discovery of the atomic nucleus. After graduating in 1939, he returned to Colombo.

== Career ==
=== Indian Police Service ===
After returning to Sri Lanka, Jayaram attempted the civil services exam, however due to his Indian origins, was not allowed to work for the civil service. Following this, he joined the Imperial Police in India, then under British rule.

Medals awarded to Jayaram

His first posting was in Tenali in the Madras Presidency, now Andhra Pradesh, in 1940. Over the next few years, he was posted throughout the presidency before being called to join the Intelligence Bureau in 1948 under Sir N.P. Smith and T.G. Sanjeevi Pillai. Pillai was to become the first Indian to head the Intelligence Bureau.

=== Intelligence Bureau ===
Jayaram served with the IB during the 1950s and early 1960s. He was posted in Cairo and Beijing and was known to be an acquaintance of Kim Philby, one of the members of the infamous Cambridge Five. In Cairo, journalist David Holden often called on him and his wife. In 1962, he returned to India to work at headquarters. He worked in the IB as an assistant director till 1968.

In 1968, Jayaram was appointed Inspector General of Andhra Pradesh, the official head of police in the state. He served till 1971 when Indira Gandhi on the recommendation of RAW Chief R. N. Kao made him the Director of the Intelligence Bureau.

=== Director of the Intelligence Bureau ===
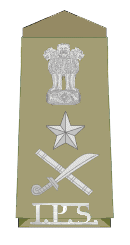
The DIB's insignia. The director is among only four officers in the country who holds a four star post.

Soon after becoming director, the 1971 War broke out. RAW and the IB had to work together. Kao and Jayaram were extremely close friends, and both ensured that their respective agencies worked together during the course of the Bangladeshi liberation.

Jayaram served as the director during the breakout of the Indian Emergency but retired on 31 August 1975 after his 60th birthday. Director General of Punjab, S.N. Mathur took over as director.

=== Emergency ===
On 12 June 1975, Justice Jagmohanlal Sinha of the Allahabad High Court found the Prime Minister guilty on the charge of misuse of government machinery for her election campaign. Protests led by J.P.Narayan, Raj Narain, Satyendra Narayan Sinha and Morarji Desai flooded the streets of Delhi close to the Parliament building and the Prime Minister's residence. According to the first interim report of the Shah Commission on 11 March 1978, no reports were filed by the Intelligence Bureau between 12 and 18 June, suggesting a state of emergency. Chapter 5.28 of the report says that on 18 June a top secret note between Prime Minister Indira Gandhi and the Director of Intelligence suggested constant surveillance of the Congress' political opponents.

On the evening of 25 June 1975, Mrs. Gandhi wrote to President Fakhruddin Ali Ahmed recommending a proclamation of emergency. The letter was made public under chapter 5.52 of the Shah Commission report.

Chapters 5.57, 5.58 and 5.59 of the report say that Jayaram, S.L. Khurana(Home Secretary) and H.R. Gokhale(Minister for Law and Justice) learnt of the Emergency only on the morning of 26 June.

Chapter 5.60(g) states that
"While the Director of Intelligence, the Home Secretary, Cabinet Secretary(B.D. Pande) and the secretary to the Prime Minister(Parmeshwar Narayan Haksar) had not been taken into confidence, Shri R.K. Dhawan, the then additional private secretary to the Prime Minister had been associated with the preparation and promulgation of the emergency from the early stage".

This statement suggested that the four officials, including Jayaram had possibly opposed Mrs. Gandhi's decision to impose emergency. Due to this opposition, it is possible that Mrs. Gandhi asked Jayaram to resign after being given a one-year extension earlier that month. Facts are currently unknown, but it is likely that Mrs. Gandhi would have preferred to have the police force on her side during the Emergency.

=== Anecdotes ===
A.S Dulat, former director of RAW called him "A gentleman’s gentleman".

Like Kao, Jayaram was known to have an extremely sharp mind and was considered a no nonsense intelligence chief. Dulat commented that during an intelligence meeting, an officer had made a mistake. Jayaram addressed everybody with a quick remark, "Gentleman, a cat has nine lives, an intelligence officer has one," reiterating the fact that the IB could not afford to make mistakes.

Surendra Pathania, former Director General of Maharashtra, commented that Jayaram had a great sense of style. Pathania, a junior officer at the time, called on Jayaram at 9, Tuglak Road(the Director's official residence) and was surprised to see him in dark pink trousers. "He was effortlessly stylish and junior officers like us were always welcome at 9, Tuglak Road."

== See also ==
Bangladesh Liberation War
Emergency
Intelligence Bureau

Government offices
Preceded by M.L. Hooja	Director of the Intelligence Bureau; 1971–1975	Succeeded by S.N. Mathur
