= Operation Sundown =

Unexecuted Indian intelligence operation

Operation Sundown was codename of a covert plan of India's external intelligence agency Research & Analysis Wing (R&AW), in which the Special Group, which is an ultra-secretive armed unit of the R&AW, was to abduct Sikh leader Sant Jarnail Singh Bhindranwale from Guru Nanak Niwas in the Golden Temple complex, Amritsar.

== The operation ==
The rehearsals for the operation were carried out in the base. But, the operation was never started due to the then Prime Minister of India Indira Gandhi’s rejection.

Other options such as negotiations were opted for instead. The negotiations failed and the law and order situation in Punjab continued to deteriorate. In April 1983, A.S. Atwal the Deputy Inspector General in Punjab Police was murdered by a follower of Jarnail Singh Bhindranwale at the steps of Golden temple. In June 1984 Operation Blue Star was approved and carried out by the Indian Army to remove Jarnail Singh Bhindranwale and his armed followers from the buildings of the Harmandir Sahib Complex in Amritsar, Punjab.

Operation Sundown was revealed almost after three decades in January 2014 by India Today Magazine through investigation of UK's declassified Top Secret documents.

== See also ==
- Operation Blue Star
- Special Group (India)
