= Jeeva (artist) =

Indian writer, artist and critic

V. Jeevanantham
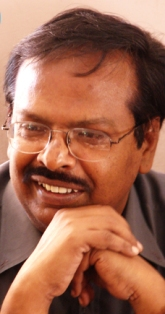
- Born: 15 March 1956 (age 70); Boothapandi, Tamil Nadu, India
- Occupations: Artist, author, lawyer, Movie Critic
- Spouse: Thamizharasi
- Children: Anand (Son), Meena (Daughter)
- Relatives: V. Manikandan (Brother)
- Writing career
- Period: 1978–present
- Subjects: Art, Painting, Cinema, Literature
- Notable work: Thiraiseelai – Book on Cinema
- Notable awards: Special Mention Award for Best Book on Cinema for Theraiseelai

V. Jeevananthan (born 15 March 1956) popularly known as Oviyar Jeeva (lit. Artist Jeeva) is an Indian painter, film critic, art designer and writer from Tamil Nadu.

== Biography ==
Jeevananthan is the eldest son of N. Velayutham Pillai, a noted banner artist for Tamil films during the 1950s, '60s and '70s in the Coimbatore area and the proprietor of Cine Arts (est. 1954). Jeevananthan started his education in English medium and Hindi as his second language. He did his schooling from Kikani Higher Secondary School, Coimbatore. He obtained a bachelor's degree in political science from Government Arts College, Coimbatore and his post graduate degree at Presidency College, Chennai. He also has a law degree from Coimbatore Law College. In addition to this, he has also completed a Postgraduate Diploma in Productivity Management (PGDPM) from Coimbatore Productivity Council. Jeevanantham does not have any formal art education. He learnt modern art painting from artist Prakash Chandra, the founder of Chitrakala (Painting) academy, Coimbatore. He is married to Thamizharasi and have two children – Anand and Meena. His brother V. Manikandan is an acclaimed cinematographer.

== Career ==
After his father's death in 1981, Jeevananthan took over Cine Arts – the family's film banner business. Since then he has painted thousands of film banners and manages the company till today. He is currently the president of Chitrakala Academy, an association of Coimbatore artists.

Since 1978, he has been exhibiting his works at Chithrakala Academy's Annual Art Exhibition in Coimbatore, Chennai and Bengaluru. His painting collections are displayed at Valluvar Kottam, Chennai. He was one of the 133 painters from all over India to paint Kural Oviyams (lit. Paintings on Tirukkural) exhibited since 2000, with the unveiling of Valluvar Statue at Kanyakumari. He has also painted banners and posters for 20 dramas for the theatre group Schauspielhaus Zürich at Zurich, Switzerland. In 2009, he exhibited his paintings on communist leader P. Jeevanandham as part of Jeevanandham's centenary celebrations. He has done Illustrations for Ajantha Ellora documentaries produced jointly by Japan and Maharashtra governments and directed by R. Ramkumar, of Vikram Studios. He is also an illustrator for short stories in Tamil Magazine Vaarththai, Om Sakthi, Veedu (Canada), Uyirmai etc. He designed Book wrappers for most of Tamil writer Naanjil Naadan's Novels.

Jeevanantham is also a noted film reviewer and critic. In the 1980s, he wrote film reviews for the Tamil magazine Kalki as a student journalist. He has worked as an illustrator for literary magazines besides designing covers for novels. He was also a student artist in Dhisaigal a youth magazine edited by Maalan during the 1980s. Jeeva delivers lectures and demonstrations on portraits in most of the colleges in and around Coimbatore as a part of Fine Arts club activities. He is an active member of Sunday art classes since 1979 for students. During 2008–09, Jeeva taught monthly art classes to inmates of the central prison, Coimbatore. His reviews appear in mouthshut.com, in the name of Ajayan.

== Awards ==
Jeevananthan's book Thirai seelai, received "special Mention" in the Best Book category of the National Film Awards, 2011, that were announced in Delhi on 19 May 2011. The citation he received says "This book is a sincere attempt to analyze important developments in Tamil film. It also provides an insight into the classics of world cinema highlighting their aesthetic values." Thirai seelai with 40 chapters is his first book and is a collection of his essays on film. They were selected from the film articles he wrote for the magazine Rasanai over the years. It was published by Trishakthi Sundar Raman through Trishakthi Publications.

He has also been nominated as one of the World's best 100 Caricaturists by Romanian Cartoonists Association in 2007. He won Excellency Prize for best artists in the world for 2007. Recently he won Vocational Excellence Award from Rotaract Club of Coimbatore Unique.

=== Honours ===
- Kalaimamani Award - 2019

== Bibliography ==
- Thiraiseelai (lit. Curtain)
- Asayum Padam (lit. Motion Picture)
