= R. N. Manickam =

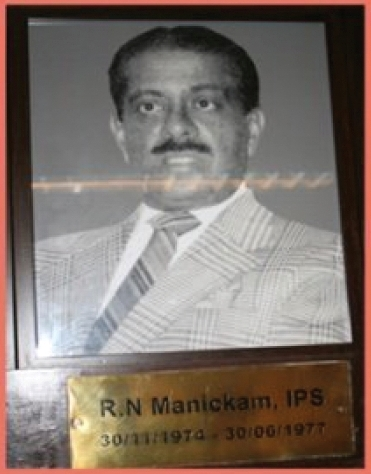

R. N. Manickam, official photograph as Principal Director, DGS

Rishiyur Nataraja Manickam (1 July 1919 – 11 September 2015) was an Indian Police Service officer in the Intelligence Bureau and the Research and Analysis Wing, and retired as Principal Director in R&AW's co-agency, Directorate General of Security. He was Director of the Aviation Research Centre during the Bangladesh War.

== Early life ==
Born in Rishiyur in the then Madras Presidency, he was educated in Board High Schools, Erode and Bhavani; Government Arts College, Coimbatore and St. Joseph's College, Tiruchirappalli.

== State service in Madras ==
Manickam initially joined the State Police Service, Madras, but was promoted to the Indian Police Service on 3 December 1950 with retrospective allotment year of 1943. He served as S.P. of Madurai and S.P. in the C.I.D.

== Central service ==
Manickam went on central deputation on 1 December 1957 and joined the Ministry of External Affairs. Initially he was posted as First Secretary in the Indian Embassy in Washington. He was thereafter posted as Director in MEA, New Delhi, from which he was transferred to the Intelligence Bureau on 31 August 1963 and posted as deputy director. He was repatriated to Madras cadre on 15 December 1965 and subsequently became Inspector General of Police in the state. During this time, he also became honorary president of the Madras Gymkhana Club in 1967–68. On subsequent central deputation, Manickam became Director of the Aviation Research Centre in the early 1969. As Director ARC, he was involved in technical and aerial intelligence during the Bangladesh War. He became Principal Director, DGS on 30 November 1974, with oversight on SSB, SFF and ARC. Manickam retired as PD on 30 June 1977. Much later, in 1993–94, he worked as Member, Tamil Nadu State Consumer Disputes Redressal Commission.

== Awards ==
He had received the Police and Fire Services Medal for Distinguished Service in 1967 and Police Medal for Meritorious Service in 1958.

== Memoirs ==
Post-retirement, Manickam wrote his memoirs of 36 years of service, titled Security, Espionage and Counter Intelligence, published in 2000.

== Controversy ==
In March 1981, in a seven-page affidavit, Manickam alleged that his relatives had paid Rs. 10.75 lakh to the relatives of M. G. Ramachandran, chief minister of Tamil Nadu, as bribe for liquor distribution license, but they did not get the license. So, Manickam demanded the money back. This became a political sensation of the time, being used for political purposes by the opposition parties, DMK and the Congress, and resulted into three inquiry commissions.
