= Adrishya =

2014 Indian television series

- Genre: Non-Fiction
- Directed by: Raaghav Dar; Nidhi Tuli
- Country of origin: India
- Original language: Hindi
- No. of seasons: 1
- No. of episodes: 13

Production
- Producers: Nidhi Tuli; Ashraf Abbas
- Running time: 60 minutes

Original release
- Network: Epic TV
- Release: 21 November 2014

Adrishya (lit. 'Invisible') is a non-fiction Indian Hindi-language television series that aired on Epic TV. The show is based on real-life stories of Indian spies. The show premiered on 21 November 2014 and aired thirteen episodes.

== Show summary ==
Adrishya is a show based on some of the greatest spies in Indian history. These are stories of the unsung heroes that fought for a cause. Every episode depicts the life of a spy and the dangers that accompanied the job. The show presents all the tales from post and pre- Independence era of India.

Some of the spies covered in the show are Chhatrapati Shivaji Maharaj's chief intelligence officer Bahirji Naik, Kacha – Spy of the Gods, Noor Inayat Khan – descendant of Tipu Sultan and a spy for the British in Paris during World War II, Durgawati Devi – the gutsy lady who helped Bhagat Singh escape, Jeevsiddhi – Chanakya's spy, Spies of R&AW Ravindra Kaushik – the spy who infiltrated Pakistan's army, Ajit Doval who sabotaged Khalistani terrorists during Operation Black Thunder, Amar Bhushan and many more. The series was consistently rated among the top ten shows of this station.

== Production ==
The show is produced by Nidhi Tuli, Ashraf Abbas and Akash Thakkar of Rangrez Films and written by Amit Babbar, Anurag Goswami, Purva Naresh, Nidhi Tuli, Raaghav Dar and Sneha Nair. It was shot by Alphonse Roy and edited by Navnita Sen and Zubin Sheikh.

== Episodes ==
- Episode 1 - Jeevsiddhi - A trusted spy employed by Chanakya to spy and influence Rakshasa, and thwart an assassination attempt on Chandragupta Maurya.
- Episode 2 - Bahirji Naik - The Chhatrapati Shivaji's Chief Intelligence Officer
- Episode 3 - Noor Inayat Khan - The Unlikely Spy
- Episode 4 - Kacha - Spy of The Gods
- Episode 5 - Aziz Un Nisa
- Episode 6 - Ravindra Kaushik
- Episode 7 - Saraswathi Rajamani
- Episode 8 - Durga Bhabhi
- Episode 9 - Chand Bardai
- Episode 10 - KSN & Kao
- Episode 11 - Sharan Kaur
- Episode 12 - Ajit Doval
- Episode 13 - Amar Bhushan
