= Charbatia =

- Town
- Location in Odisha, India Charbatia (India)
- Coordinates: 20.5869°N 85.9318°E
- Country: India
- State: Odisha
- District: Cuttack

Population (2001)
  - Total: 5,232

Languages
  - Official: Oriya
- Time zone: UTC+5:30 (IST)
- PIN: 754028
- Vehicle registration: OD 05

Charbatia is a census town in Cuttack district in the state of Odisha, India. It has an airbase operated by Indian air force.

== Demographics ==
As of 2001 census, Charbatia, India, had a population of 5232. Males constituted 54% of the population, and females 46%. Charbatia had an average literacy rate of 85%; male literacy was 88% and female, 81%. 10% of the population is under 6 years of age.
