= K. Sankaran Nair =

Indian civil servant and diplomat

- Born: 20 December 1919; Ottapalam, Madras Presidency, British India
- Died: 17 November 2015 (aged 95); Bengaluru, Karnataka, India
- Other name: Colonel Menon
- Education: Loyola College, Chennai
- Occupations: Intelligence officer; Diplomat; Civil servant
- Known for: Bangladesh Liberation War
- Awards: Padma Bhushan

K. Sankaran Nair (20 December 1919 – 17 November 2015), known as Colonel Menon among his colleagues, was an Indian civil servant, diplomat and the director of Research and Analysis Wing. He served as the Indian High Commissioner to Singapore from 1986 to 1988 and was the last surviving member of the Indian Imperial Police. He was reported to have played a crucial role in the formation of Bangladesh, through R&AW operations during the Bangladesh Liberation War.

His memoirs, Inside IB and RAW: A Rolling Stone that Gathered Moss, published in 2008 made news for the insider details it contained about two of the highest intelligence agencies in India. The Government of India awarded him the third highest civilian honour of the Padma Bhushan, in 1983, for his contributions to society.

== Biography ==
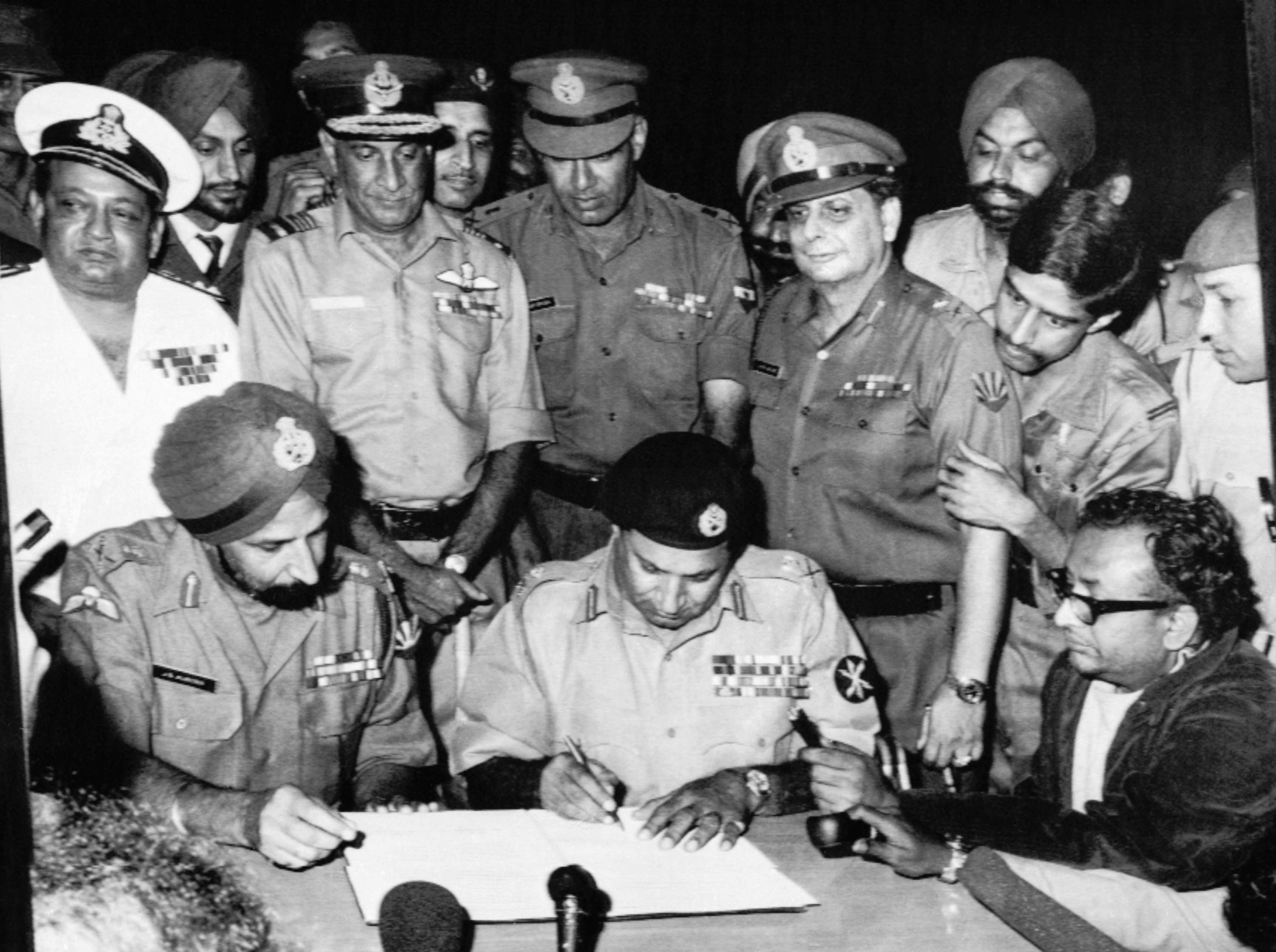
1971 Instrument of Surrender – Bangladesh Liberation War.

Sankaran Nair was born on 20 December 1919 at Ottapalam, in Palakkad district of the south Indian state of Kerala and did his graduate studies at Loyola College, Chennai. Subsequently, he pursued studies in Law but abandoned it midway when he was inducted into the Indian Imperial Police. After the Indian independence, he continued at the Intelligence Bureau (IB) and in 1959, went to Ghana to successfully complete the IB assignment of establishing Ghana's Intelligence Agency, returning to India after two years. In the aftermath of the Indo-Pakistani War of 1965, he was involved in the investigations against Intelligence Bureau on allegations of ineptitude, and was reported to have submitted 65 reports to the investigation committee.

When Research and Analysis Wing was formed in 1968 as a splinter agency of IB, Nair became the deputy of Rameshwar Nath Kao, the founder director of the agency. During the Bangladesh Liberation War of 1971, he was in-charge of the operations there and his contributions in training the Mukti Bahini guerrillas are reported to have played a vital role in the successful liberation of Bangladesh. After Kao's resignation from R&AW in 1977 (reports suggest that he was forced to demit office), Nair succeeded him as the director but his tenure lasted only three months as he resigned from the post, reportedly in protest, when Morarji Desai, the then Prime Minister of India, downgraded the position of the director of R&AW from rank of a Cabinet Secretary. He was moved to Minority Commission as its secretary from where he superannuated in December 1978. However, he was involved with R&AW operations again with the accession of Indira Gandhi to power again in 1980, and was known to have contributed to the restructuring of the agency. In 1981, he was given the responsibility of the Secretary General of the 1982 Asian Games and four years later, in 1986, he was appointed as the High Commissioner of India to Singapore, holding the post until his retirement from active service in 1988.

The Government of India awarded him the civilian honour of the Padma Bhushan in 1983. In 2008, he published his memoirs, Inside IB and R&AW: The Rolling Stone that Gathered Moss, which narrated his official life at Intelligence Bureau and Research and Analysis Wing and the book featured many notable personalities such as Sanjay Gandhi, Morarji Desai, V. C. Shukla, Indira Gandhi, R. N. Kao, Y. B. Chavan and Rajiv Gandhi. The book discussed about the lapses during the Sino-Indian War of 1962 and the Indo-Pakistan War of 1965 as well as several inside information in Indian politics and reportedly made news.

He died on 17 November 2015 at his daughter's residence in Bengaluru where he spent his last years, at the age of 95, survived by the daughter; his wife had preceded him in death three years earlier.

== Memoirs ==
- Inside IB and RAW The Rolling Stone that Gathered Moss

== See also ==
- Adrishya

Preceded by Rameshwar Nath Kao	Director of R&AW; 1977	Succeeded by -
