= Indian Postal Service =

- Emblem of India

Service Overview
- Abbreviation: IPoS
- Formed: 1948
- Country: India
- Training Academy: Rafi Ahmed Kidwai National Postal Academy (RAKNPA), Ghaziabad
- Cadre Controlling Authority: Department of Post; Ministry of Communications
- Minister Responsible: Jyotiraditya Scindia
- Legal Personality: Governmental, Civil Service
- Cadre strength: 561

Service Chief
- Chairperson Postal Services Board: Ms. Vandita Kaul, Secretary (Post)

Head of the All India Civil Services
- Cabinet Secretary: T. V. Somanathan, IAS

The Indian Postal Service (IPoS) is a group 'A' civil service under the department of Post and a part of the Ministry of Communications under the Government of India. IPoS monitors and manages the postal service in India, both as traditional postal service, banking and e-commerce in India Post.

== Recruitment ==
Recruitment to the Indian Postal Service (IPoS) is primarily conducted through the Civil Services Examination held by the Union Public Service Commission (UPSC).

== Training ==
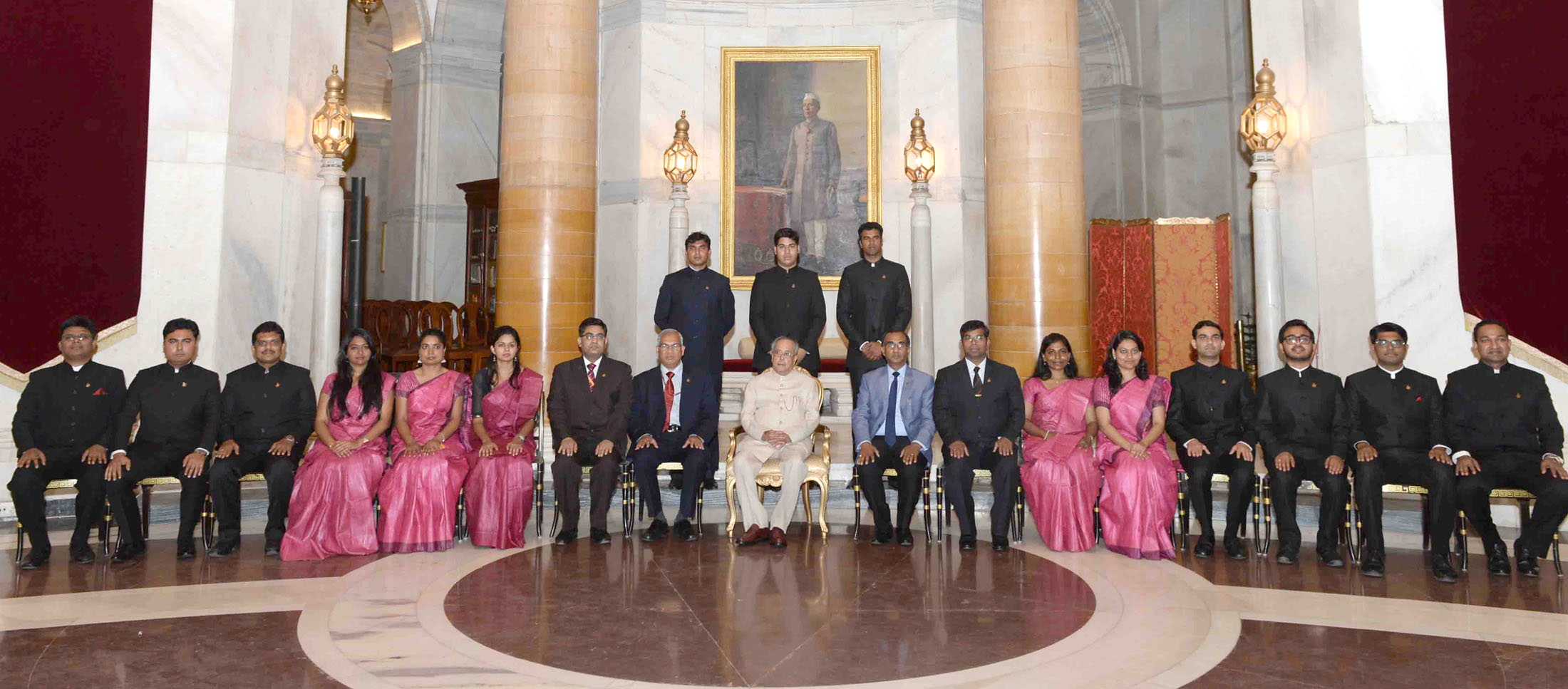
The President of India, Shri Pranab Mukherjee with the Probationers of Indian Postal Service (2016 Batch) from Rafi Ahmed Kidwai National Postal Academy, Ghaziabad, at Rashtrapati Bhavan, in New Delhi on April 05, 2017

Probationers in Indian Postal Service training is conducted in two stages as below:

Stage 1: Foundation Course at Lal Bahadur Shastri National Academy of Administration (LBSNAA).

Stage 2: Professional training in management and administration of postal services Rafi Ahmed Kidwai National Postal Academy(RAKNPA).

== Career progression ==
After joining the IPoS, the officer starts his/her career as a Senior Superintendent of Post Offices in the rank of Assistant Secretary to the Government of India. After 5 years, the first promotion takes place to the rank of Assistant Post Master General equivalent to Under Secretary. After 10 years, the officer is promoted to Additional General Manager equivalent to Deputy Secretary. After 13 years, the officer is promoted to Director Postal Service equivalent to Director. After 18–20 years of service, the officer becomes Post Master General equivalent to the Joint Secretary. After 28-30 years of service, the officer attains the rank of Chief Post Master General equivalent to the Additional Secretary. After 34-35 years or more of service, the Appointments Committee of the Cabinet considers the officer for appointment to the rank of Director General Postal Service equivalent to the rank of Secretary.

=== Rank structure ===
Ranks, designations, and positions held by Indian Postal Service officers in their career
Grade / Scale (Level on Pay Matrix)	Posting in Indian Postal Service	Position in Government of India	Position in Order of precedence in India	Pay Scale (Basic Pay)
Apex Scale (Pay Level 17)	Chairperson Postal Services Board/ Director General Postal Service	Secretary	23	₹225,000 (US$2,400)
Higher Administrative Grade + (Pay Level 16)	Member, Postal Service Board/Additional Director General	Additional Secretary	25	₹205,400 (US$2,200)—₹224,400 (US$2,400)
Higher Administrative Grade (Pay Level 15)	Sr. Deputy Director General/Chief Post Master General /Chief General Manager	Additional Secretary	25	₹182,200 (US$1,900)—₹224,100 (US$2,400)
Senior Administrative Grade (Pay Level 14)	Post Master General / Deputy Director General / General Manager	Joint Secretary	26	₹144,200 (US$1,500)—₹218,200 (US$2,300)
Selection Grade (Pay Level 13)	Director Postal Service	Director		₹123,100 (US$1,300)—₹215,900 (US$2,300)
Junior Administrative Grade (Pay Level 12)	Additional General Manager	Deputy Secretary		₹78,800 (US$840)—₹209,200 (US$2,200)
Senior Time Scale (Pay Level 11)	Assistant Director General/Assistant Director Postal Service/Assistant Post Master General	Under Secretary		₹67,700 (US$720)—₹208,700 (US$2,200)
Junior Time Scale (Pay Level 10)	Senior Superintendent of Post Offices/Senior Superintendent of Railway Mails Entry-level (Probationer)	Assistant Secretary		₹56,100 (US$600)—₹177,500 (US$1,900)

== Notable Indian Postal Service officers ==
- Arvind Saxena, former Chairman of the UPSC
- Vikram Sood, former Secretary of the R&AW
