= Arvind Saxena =

Indian politician

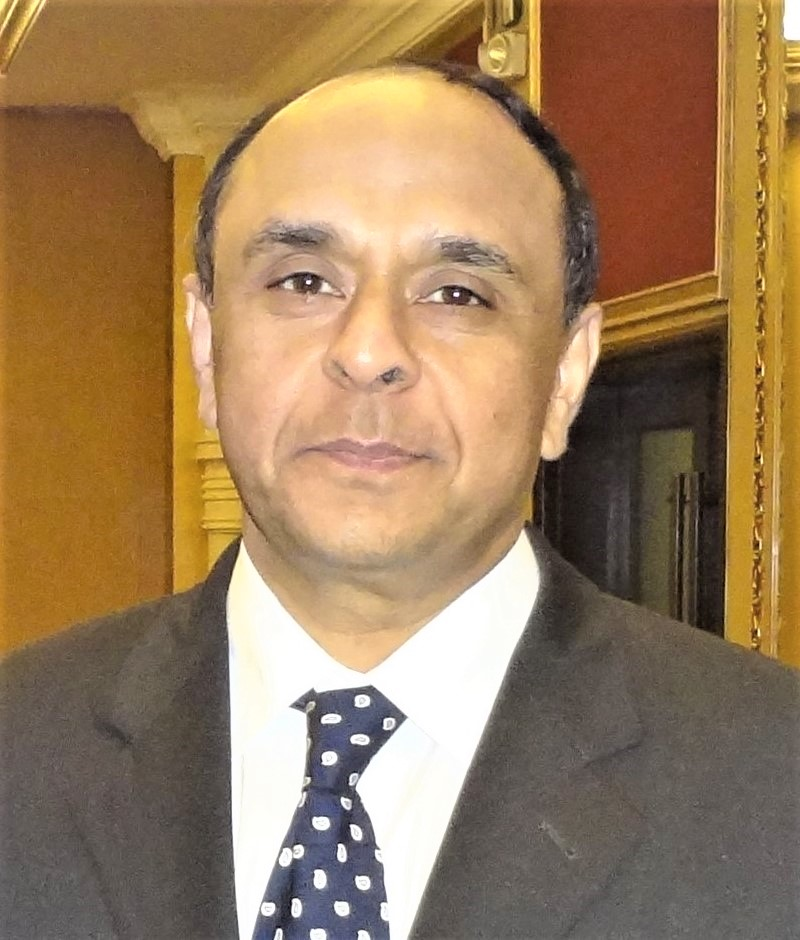

Chairperson of the Union Public Service Commission
- In office 28 November 2018 – 7 August 2020
- Preceded by: Vinay Mittal
- Succeeded by: Pradeep Kumar Joshi

Member, Union Public Service Commission
- In office May 2015 – November 2018

Special Secretary in-charge, Aviation Research Centre
- In office December 2014 – May 2015

Personal details
- Born: 8 August 1955 (age 71) Delhi, India
- Education: Delhi College of Engineering; Indian Institute of Technology Delhi (M. Tech)
- Occupation: Civil servant

Arvind Saxena (born 8 August 1955) is an Indian civil servant and is the former chairman of the Union Public Service Commission (UPSC). A 1978-batch officer, he served in the Indian Postal Service for 10 years, before joining the Research and Analysis Wing in 1988, and the UPSC in 2015.

== Education ==
Saxena earned his bachelor's degree in civil engineering from Delhi College of Engineering, Delhi, before pursuing the master's degree in systems management from the Indian Institute of Technology Delhi.

== Career ==
He joined the Indian Postal Service in 1978 and worked as Divisional Head of Postal Services at Bharatpur and Kota. In 1982, Saxena was appointed Officer on Special Duty in-charge of arrangements for postal services for the Asian Games and the seventh meeting of the Non-Aligned Movement. He later took over as Philately Officer at the Postal Directorate in New Delhi and subsequently as OSD for modernization of the Stamps and Seals Factory in Aligarh. He was posted as Director, Mail Planning Operations in Mumbai, looking after mail arrangements in the States of Maharashtra, Gujarat and Madhya Pradesh, before being selected as Principal of the Postal Training Centre in Saharanpur. He also underwent a program for trainers at the University of Manchester in the UK.

In 1988, Saxena left the Postal Service to join the Research and Analysis Wing, where he "specialised in the study of strategic developments in neighbouring countries", including Nepal, China and Pakistan. Apart from serving in various countries, he served in the Indian States of Jammu and Kashmir, Punjab and Himachal Pradesh. He took over as Special Secretary in-charge of the Aviation Research Centre (ARC) in December 2014, where he worked in strengthening ties with similar agencies of other countries while interacting closely with the Chiefs of the Indian Armed Forces and heads of the Central Armed Police Forces. Saxena is a recipient of awards for Meritorious Services (2005) and Distinguished Services (2012), conferred by the Prime Minister of India.

=== Union Public Service Commission ===
In May 2015, he joined the Union Public Service Commission (UPSC) as its member and was appointed its acting chairman in June 2018, after the retirement of Vinay Mittal. In November 2018, he was appointed the full-time chairman.
