= Charbatia Air Base =

Airforce base in Odisha, India

Charbatia Air Base ARC Field
- IATA: none; ICAO: VE62

Summary
- Operator: Aviation Research Centre
- Location: Cuttack, Odisha, India
- Elevation AMSL: 115 ft / 35 m
- Coordinates: 20°32′58.63″N 085°53′10.54″E

Map
- Location of the airport in Odisha Charbatia Air Base (India)

Runways
Direction	Length		Surface
Direction	m	ft	Surface
04/22	2,743	9,000	Asphalt
- Source: DAFIF

Charbatia Air Base (ICAO: VE62) is located approximately 12 km north of Cuttack, Odisha near town of Charbatia in eastern India.

== History ==
The airstrip was built by the British during World War II and was abandoned after the war.

=== Use by CIA ===
During the Sino-Indian War, prime minister Jawaharlal Nehru agreed to allow the Central Intelligence Agency to fly Lockheed U-2 reconnaissance missions over India in order to surveil the India–China border. The following year, Charbatia Air Base was further renovated and was used by the CIA, which conducted multiple U2 surveillance missions from the base between 1964 and 1967.

The first aircraft was delivered in the mid 60s and was a World War II vintage C-46 Commando which was outfitted with an oxygen distribution system for operator and flight personnel along with surveillance electronics and recording equipment at the Air America base in Tainan, Taiwan. The installation was supervised by the design engineer, Mr. Kent Williamson. Mr. Williamson, along with other experienced personnel also deployed to Charbatia to train the first operator and maintenance personnel. Later additions to the surveillance equipment include specially outfitted Boeing 727 and Gulfstream III jets.

=== Expansion plans and cancellation ===
The air base is spread over 2,000 acres (8.1 km^{2}). In 2011, the Government of India which controls the airbase announced that it will be converted into a full-fledged Indian Air Force station with six C-130J Super Hercules transport aircraft. But the plans for setting up such a station was subsequently cancelled and the C-130 Hercules transport unit was shifted to Panagarh air force base in West Bengal.

== Aviation Research Center ==
Charbatia Air base houses aerial reconnaissance post of the intelligence agency's aviation unit, the Aviation Research Centre (ARC). The Research and Analysis Wing, India's primary foreign intelligence agency, operates intelligence collection aircraft through the ARC. The aircraft are fitted with electronic surveillance equipment and long range cameras capable of taking pictures of targets from high altitudes.
