= Prafullachandra Vishnu Sane =

Indian molecular biologist

- Born: 24 December 1937 (age 88); Chiplun, Ratnagiri district, Maharashtra, India
- Education: Nagpur University; University of Alberta; Ruhr University Bochum
- Known for: Studies on Photosynthesis
- Awards: 1981 Shanti Swarup Bhatnagar Prize; 1991 Bharat Jyoti Scientist of the Year Award; 1994 IBS Birbal Sahni Medal
- Scientific career
- Fields: Plant physiology; Biochemistry; Molecular biology
- Workplaces: Bureau of Indian Standards; University of California, Berkeley; Bhabha Atomic Research Center; National Botanical Research Institute

Prafullachandra Vishnu Sane (born 1937) is an Indian molecular biologist and plant physiologist, known for his pioneering studies on photosynthesis. He is a former director of National Botanical Research Institute and an elected fellow of the Indian Academy of Sciences, Indian National Science Academy, National Academy of Sciences, India, National Academy of Agricultural Sciences and the Maharashtra Academy of Sciences. The Council of Scientific and Industrial Research, the apex agency of the Government of India for scientific research, awarded him the Shanti Swarup Bhatnagar Prize for Science and Technology, one of the highest Indian science awards, in 1981, for his contributions to biological sciences.

== Biography ==
Prafullachandra Vishnu Sane, born on the Christmas Eve of 1937 at Chiplun, in Ratnagiri district in the Indian state of Maharashtra to Vishnu Jagannath Sane and Indira, did his schooling at New English High School, Nagpur and college studies at Agriculture College of Dr. Panjabrao Deshmukh Krishi Vidyapeeth from where he graduated in 1958. After obtaining his master's degree in agriculture from Nagpur University in 1960, he started his career at Bureau of Indian Standards in 1961 and continued there till 1964 when he moved to the University of Alberta, Edmonton for his doctoral studies to secure a PhD in 1968. He stayed in the North America for three more years, working at the University of California, Berkeley as an assistant research botanist and returned to India to join the Agricultural Biochemistry Section of Bhabha Atomic Research Center (BARC) as its head in 1972 where he worked till 1984. In between, receiving an Alexander von Humboldt Foundation fellowship, he spent one year at Ruhr University Bochum during 1979–80. In 1984, he became the director of the National Botanical Research Institute, Lucknow and held the post till his superannuation in 1997. Post retirement, he joined Jain Irrigation Systems Limited, Jalgaon where he is a principal adviser at their Agri-Biotech division.

Sane is married to Suchitra Khandekar and the couple has two sons. The family lives in Lucknow.

== Legacy ==
During his stint at Ruhr University Bochum, Sane worked on the modality of electron transport and transduction of energy in chloroplast membranes and discovered that the generation of pH gradient across the membranes is due to the presence of proton-translocating proteins. Basing his studies on a mutant of Gateway Barley, he did an elaborate biochemical analysis of carbon assimilation and reactions of Ch1 biosynthesis. Associating with Roderic Park, he developed a new method for the isolation of PS-I and PS-II, without the use of detergents and propounded a model for distributing the two photosystems in the chloroplast lamellae. Their findings were published in an article, Distribution of Function and Structure in Chloroplast Lamellae, which eventually became a citation classic.

During his days at the Bhabha Atomic Research Centre, Sane led a team who discovered the involvement of charge pairs in producing the emitted light and these researches are reported to have helped in widening our knowledge about energy storage during electron transport. Later, he also made pioneering studies on tobacco transgenic plants and sorghum. He has published his research findings as chapters in several books and in over 160 articles, ResearchGate, an online repository of scientific papers, has listed 87 of them. It was during his tenure as the director of National Botanical Research Institute, the Centre for Plant Molecular Biology was established at the institute. He is a former president and an adviser to the International Society of Environmental Botanists (ISEB), a Lucknow-based non-profit, non-governmental organisation promoting coordinated research on plants and environmental pollution and served as a member of the council of the Indian National Science Academy from 1996 to 1998. He has also mentored 20 scholars in their doctoral studies.

== Awards and honors ==
The Council of Scientific and Industrial Research awarded Sane the Shanti Swarup Bhatnagar Prize, one of the highest Indian science awards, in 1981. The National Academy of Sciences, India elected him as their fellow in 1987, the same year as he became an elected fellow of the Indian Academy of Sciences. The year 1991 brought him the Bharat Jyoti Best Scientist of the Year Award as well as fellowships of the Indian National Science Academy and the National Academy of Agricultural Sciences. Sane, who is also a fellow of the Maharashtra Academy of Sciences and a life member of the Society for Plant Physiology and Biochemistry and the Indian Photobiology Society, received the Birbal Sahni Medal of the Indian Botanical Society in 1994.

== Selected bibliography ==
- R B Park, and P V Sane (June 1971). "Distribution of Function and Structure in Chloroplast Lamellae". Annual Review of Plant Physiology. 22: 395–430. doi:10.1146/annurev.pp.22.060171.002143.
- Agepati S Raghavendra, Prafullachandra Vishnu Sane, Prasanna Mohanty (February 2003). "Photosynthesis research in India: Transition from yield physiology into molecular biology". Photosynthesis Research. 76 (1): 435–50. doi:10.1023/A:1024934432008. PMID 16228599. S2CID 31701565.
- Prafullachandra Vishnu Sane, Alexander G. Ivanov, Vaughan Hurry, Norman P. A. Huner and Gunnar Öquist (August 2003). "Changes in the Redox Potential of Primary and Secondary Electron-Accepting Quinones in Photosystem II Confer Increased Resistance to Photoinhibition in Low-Temperature-Acclimated Arabidopsis". Plant Physiology. 132 (4): 2144–2151. doi:10.1104/pp.103.022939. JSTOR 4281292. PMC 181298. PMID 12913169.
- Alexander G. Ivanov, Prafullachandra V. Sane, Vaughan Hurry, Gunnar Öquist, Norman P. A. Huner (2008). "Photosystem II reaction centre quenching: mechanisms and physiological role". Photosynthesis Research. 98 (1): 565–574. Bibcode:2008PhoRe..98..565I. doi:10.1007/s11120-008-9365-3. PMID 18821028. S2CID 8970615.
- Tomohiko Kubo, Kazuyoshi Kitazaki, Muneyuki Matsunaga, Hiroyo Kagami, Tetsuo Mikami (2011). "Male Sterility-Inducing Mitochondrial Genomes: How Do They Differ?" (PDF). Critical Reviews in Plant Sciences. 30 (4): 378–400. Bibcode:2011CRvPS..30..378K. doi:10.1080/07352689.2011.587727. hdl:2115/52681. S2CID 53364363.

== See also ==
- Photosynthesis
