= R. N. Kao =

Indian spymaster

Rameshwar Nath Kao
- Portrait of Rameshwar Nath Kao

Founder of R&AW and 1st Secretary (Research)
- In office 1968 – 1977
- Preceded by: Office created
- Succeeded by: K. Sankaran Nair

Personal details
- Born: 10 May 1918 Benares, United Provinces, British India (present day Varanasi, Uttar Pradesh, India)
- Died: 20 January 2002 (aged 83) Delhi, India
- Spouse: Malini Kao
- Children: 1
- Relatives: Mahendra Nath Mulla (brother-in-law)
- Education: University of Lucknow; University of Allahabad
- Profession: Spymaster

Rameshwar Nath Kao (10 May 1918 – 20 January 2002) was an Indian spymaster, bureaucrat, police officer and Intelligence officer. He is best known for serving as the first secretary of India's external intelligence agency, the Research and Analysis Wing (R&AW) from its founding in 1968 to 1977.

Kao held the position of Secretary (Research) in the Cabinet Secretariat of the Government of India. He had also, during the course of his long career, served as the personal security chief to Prime Minister Jawaharlal Nehru and as security adviser to Prime Minister Rajiv Gandhi. He also founded the Aviation Research Centre (ARC) and the Joint Intelligence Committee. An intensely private man, Kao was rarely seen in public post-retirement.

== Personal life ==
=== Early years ===
Kao was born in the holy city of Banaras (now Varanasi) in United Provinces (Uttar Pradesh) on 10 May 1918 to a Kashmiri Pandit family who migrated from Srinagar district of Jammu and Kashmir. He was brought up by his uncle Pandit Trilokinath Kao. Encouraged to pursue education, he had his early schooling in the city of Baroda, in the Bombay Presidency. Here he did his matriculation in 1932 and intermediate in 1934. In 1936, he attained a Bachelor of Arts degree from Lucknow University. He then chose to pursue a master's degree in English Literature at Allahabad University. He completed his Master of Arts degree some time before 1940.

=== Later years ===
Rameshwarnath Kao was also known as Ramji amongst his friends and colleagues. A fiercely private man, he was rarely seen in public. Some attribute this to a life devoted to adventure and espionage which made it very difficult for him to mingle publicly. He was a recluse leading a heavily guarded life in his New Delhi bungalow, very rarely giving interviews. He died in 2002 at age 84. He is survived by his wife, Malini Kao, to whom he had been married for 60 years, and daughter Achala Kaul.

=== Personal traits ===
Kao was well-liked in the international intelligence community. His professionalism was well regarded by his colleagues and the Prime Ministers Jawaharlal Nehru and Indira Gandhi.

Count Alexandre de Marenches, erstwhile head of the French external intelligence agency, or SDECE (Service For External Documentation And Counter-Intelligence) as it was then known, named Kao as one of the 'five great intelligence chiefs of the 1970s'. About Kao, whom he knew well and admired, Count remarked:

"What a fascinating mix of physical and mental elegance! What accomplishments! What friendships! And, yet so shy of talking about himself, his accomplishments and his friends."

Alexandre praised the way Kao had built up R&AW into a professional intelligence organisation and made it play a key role to change the strategic face of the Indian subcontinent within a span of three years of R&AWs formation.

== Career ==
Kao, for a while, took up a job in a cigarette company floated by Pt. Jag Mohan Narain Mushran, the then Chief Justice of the Benares State.

=== Early career ===
Kao took classes in Law at Allahabad University but left when he joined the Indian Imperial Police in 1940 after passing Civil services examination. His first posting was at Cawnpore (Kanpur) as an Assistant Superintendent of Police. Kao was deputed to the Intelligence Bureau (I.B.), on the eve of Independence when it was being reorganised under B. N. Mullick. He was put in charge of VIP security, which included the task of looking after the security ring of Prime Minister Jawaharlal Nehru. Sometime in the late 50s he was sent to Ghana to help the then prime minister Kwame Nkrumah of government, set up an intelligence and security organisation there. With the conflict in East Pakistan during the 1970s came his finest hour.

=== Kashmir Princess ===
Kashmir Princess was a Lockheed L-749A Constellation aircraft owned by Air India which exploded in midair and crashed into the Pacific Ocean on 11 April 1955 while en route from Bombay, India and Hong Kong to Jakarta, Indonesia, carrying delegates to the Bandung Conference. 16 of those on board were killed; three survived. Investigators believed that the explosion had been caused by a time bomb placed aboard the aircraft by a secret agent of the Kuomintang, also known as the Chinese Nationalist Party, who was attempting to assassinate Chinese premier Zhou Enlai, who had been scheduled to board the plane to attend the conference but had changed his travel plans at the last minute. Kao, along with British and Chinese agents, probed the circumstances leading to the crash. His work with the Chinese earned him a letter of recommendation from Zhou Enlai.

=== Under the new Government ===
In 1977, Prime Minister Indira Gandhi was toppled when the Congress was defeated in the elections by the Janata Party. Kao's closeness to Indira Gandhi had aroused deep suspicion among the political class about his role in the Emergency. However, Kao had privately advised Mrs. Gandhi not to declare emergency. His tenure had been extended by Mrs. Gandhi; he would have retired in 1976 otherwise.

When Morarji Desai's government came to power after the Emergency, Kao was under no illusion about how the new set of politicians— who had publicly attacked Indira Gandhi for spying on them— would react to his presence. He resigned quietly and kept out of the public eye. A thorough inquiry cleared him and the R&AW of all blame. He returned when Indira made a comeback in 1980. He worked as a security adviser to both Indira and Rajiv Gandhi.

=== National Security Guard ===
Kao created the National Security Guard (NSG), during the Punjab militancy during the 1980s, to address the needs of the Government of India to counteract terrorism within the country.

== As R&AW Chief ==
=== Founding and establishing R&AW ===
After the intelligence failure of being unable to predict the Sino-Indian War of 1962 and the Operation Gibraltar of 1965, the Indian polity felt the need to establish a separate organisation for gathering intelligence for military purposes. Kao was handpicked by Jawaharlal Nehru himself, who knew him well, from his years as Nehru's Head of Personal Security. On his return from Ghana, he was made the first director of the newly formed Aviation Research Centre at Charbatia, Odisha, that chiefly concentrated on TECHINT collection. The Sino-Indian War and the Indo-Pakistani War of 1965 caused the restructuring of the country's intelligence apparatus, since real-time foreign intelligence had become a political necessity. The Intelligence Bureau of India (IB) was considered to have become something of a behemoth, and was bogged down by internal operations and politicisation.

In 1968, the then Prime Minister Indira Gandhi, who had then also begun tightening her grip on the Congress party, bifurcated the Intelligence Bureau to form the Research and Analysis Wing. The IB would be involved in domestic intelligence gathering, while the Research and Analysis Wing (R&AW) was created as India's primary external intelligence agency. Its mandate was to monitor the world in general and South Asia in particular. Kao was chosen as the head of the new organization, with a rank of Additional Secretary (Research) in the Cabinet Secretariat, later elevated to Secretary, a post that all R&AW Chiefs occupy. As its founder-chief, Kao was given the task of building up R&AW from scratch. He spent the next nine years as the head of the organisation. He took over R&AW at a time when things were beginning to heat up in the subcontinent. His tenure, which began in 1968, lasted for nearly a decade and marked the closest association that an Indian prime minister has ever had with the country's intelligence chief. He had unlimited access to Indira Gandhi. She reposed complete faith in him.

=== Bangladesh liberation war period ===
Towards the end of the 1960s, when the problems in East Pakistan began to escalate, the meetings with Indira Gandhi became more and more frequent. Recalls long-time Kao associate Victor Longer: "Intelligence is the only government business that depends upon the spoken word. Sometimes you can understand signs and body language. Kao had that rapport with Mrs Gandhi." The PMO's inner group of Kashmiri advisors D.P. Dhar, P.N. Haksar and T.N. Kaul now had another Kashmiri, Kao, for company. While what transpired at the meetings can now only be a matter of conjecture, Kao's own team, notably Shankaran Nair (former R&AW Director) and Girish Chandra Saxena (former R&AW Director and Jammu and Kashmir Governor), sized up the emerging scenario in what is now Bangladesh with precision. What was worked out was not just the larger picture but the little nuts and bolts—contingency plans and micro details. The idea of India training and equipping the freedom fighters of Mukti Bahini was evolved meticulously.

After Pakistan launched Operation Searchlight, R&AW played a highly important role in the creation of Bangladesh. They gave arms and training support to the Mukti Bahini during the initial stages of the war. Amidst the mass killings and brutal rapes, Indian operatives would get into East Pakistan, arm the local population and capitalise on the frustrations brewing within. Ashok Raina, in his book "Inside R&AW", writes: "Another R&AW assessment sent to the prime minister spelt out the need for surgical intervention for the reports that came in gave positive indications that Pakistan was preparing for war. R&AW received the green signal. R&AW established guerrilla training camps along the border and began to train an illegal army."

According to Gunaratna, the Bangladesh operation took place in two phases: covert subversion and military intervention. "Phase one was coordinated by Kao and phase two by Manekshaw, both reporting directly to Indira Gandhi," he said. During the 1971 war, intelligence was thorough enough that the Indian Air Force could bomb the room in which the East Pakistan Cabinet was in session. Naval commandos were able to blow every single Pakistani ship in the Chittagong harbour.

Kao maintained close connection with the new nation. In May 1975, Prime Minister Indira Gandhi sent him to Dhaka to warn Sheikh Mujibur Rahman of his impending assassination by some in his Army.

=== Merger of Sikkim ===
Kao can also largely be credited for merging Sikkim into India in 1975 as its 22nd state. It was he who predicted and identified the fact that the merger must be effected before other competing interests like China moved in. Delhi had publicly acknowledged the good work done by R&AW at that point. Some analysts say Kao also had a substantial role in arming Tamil guerrillas in the late seventies and eighties and played a pivotal role in Sri Lankan affairs, even though he was no longer the hands-on man.

== MOTO ==
Kao is a legend among the Indian and South Asian Intelligence community, for his creation of the R&AW as a formidable force in such a short time from its inception. He is also well regarded by his juniors. His influence was such that those who served under him during this time were affectionately called 'Kaoboys'. Although the R&AW was established only in 1968, by the 1971 war, it had become a highly efficient and formidable force. Kao is credited to have, in only three years of R&AW's existence, helped in bringing about the creation of a new nation.

Former chairman of Joint Intelligence Committee K.N. Daruwala has said:

"His contacts the world over, particularly in Asia—Afghanistan, Iran, China, you name it—were something else. He could move things with just one phone call. He was a team leader who rode out notorious inter-departmental and inter-service rivalries, which is commonplace in India."

=== R.N. Kao Memorial Lecture ===
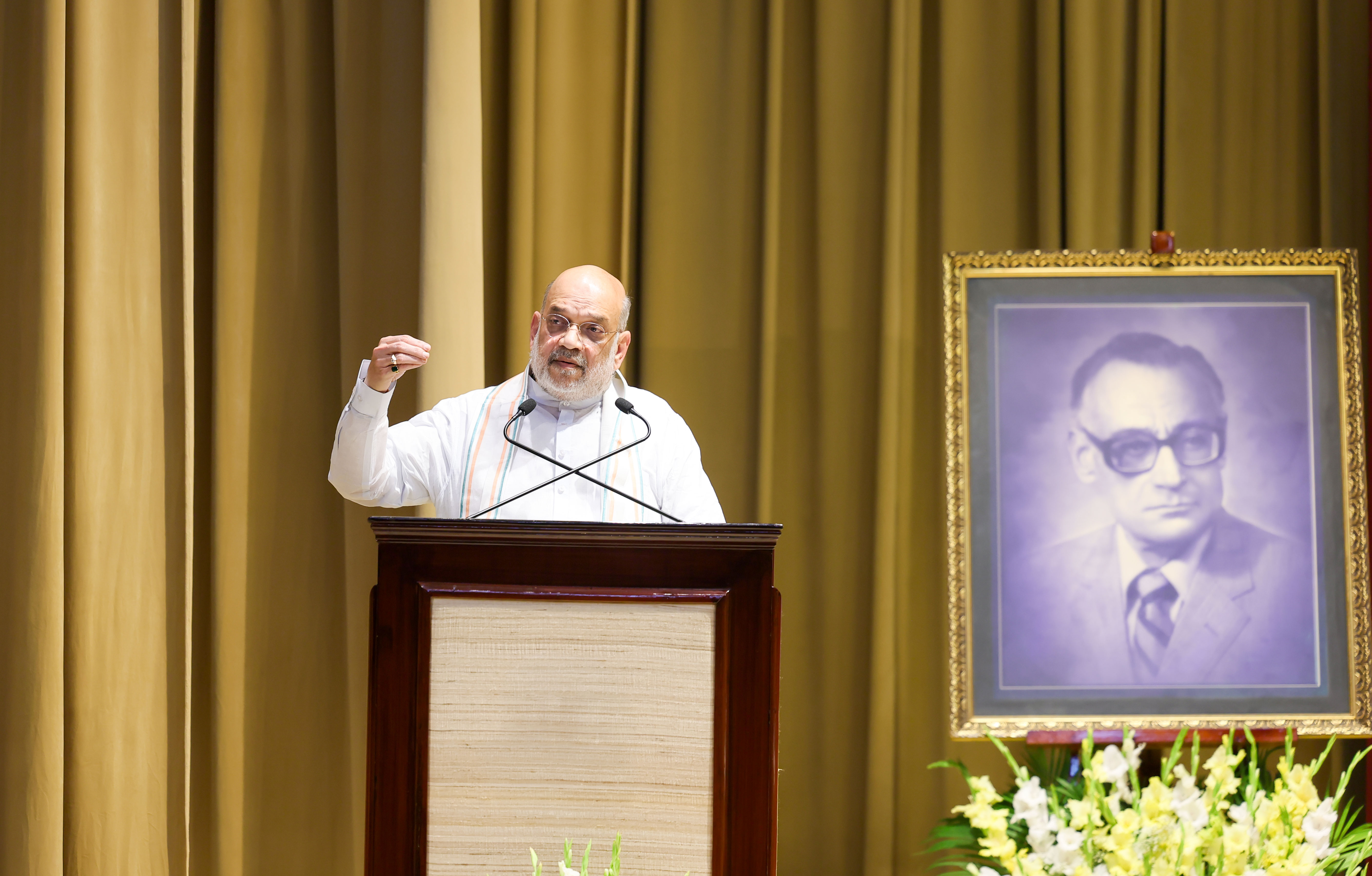
Shri Amit Shah was giving a speech during RN Kao Memorial Lecture 2026

In order to commemorate the legacy of its founder R&AW created the annual R.N. Kao Memorial Lecture. The first lecture took place in 2006 on the fifth anniversary of Kao's death, and was delivered by writer-diplomat Shashi Tharoor. In 2007 Kumar Mangalam Birla delivered the second annual lecture, he focused on the shortage of people with the right skill set, in and out of the government. He counted the scramble for talent as one of the issues that looms the largest — globally and in India — over organisations in the private and public sector.

Preceded by Post Created	Secretary (Research); 1968–1977	Succeeded by K. Sankaran Nair

== See also ==
- R.N. Kao Gentleman Spymaster
- Adrishya
