= Bhola Nath Mullik =

Former director of Intelligence Bureau of India

Padma Bhushan Bhola Nath Mullik

2nd Director of the Intelligence Bureau
- In office 15 July 1950 – 9 Oct 1964
- Prime Minister: Jawaharlal Nehru
- Preceded by: T. G. Sanjeevi Pillai
- Succeeded by: S. P. Verma

Personal details
- Born: Calcutta, Bengal Presidency, British India
- Occupation: Civil servant, spymaster
- Known for: his service as the director of Intelligence Bureau
- Awards: 1964 Padma Bhushan

Bhola Nath Mullik was an Indian civil servant, spymaster and the second director of the Intelligence Bureau of India (IB). He served as the director of IB from July 15, 1950, to October 9, 1964. He was known to be a hardworking official, with close contacts with the then Union government. It was reported that Mullik had been a close associate of Jawaharlal Nehru, the erstwhile Indian prime minister. It was on his advice, that Nehru ordered for the establishment of Special Frontier Force (SFF) (also known as Establishment 22) for defending against the Chinese army in the Sino-Indian War of 1962. The Government of India awarded him Padma Bhushan, the third-highest Indian civilian award, in 1964.

== Publications ==
- B. N. Mullik (1971). My Years with Nehru: The Chinese Betrayal. Volume 1. Allied Publishers.
- B. N. Mullik (1971). My Years with Nehru: Kashmir. Volume 2. Allied Publishers.
- B. N. Mullik (1971). My Years with Nehru, 1948-1964. Volume 3. Allied Publishers.

== See also ==
- Death of Subhas Chandra Bose
- R. N. Kao

Government offices
| Preceded by T. G. Sanjeevi Pillai | Director of the Intelligence Bureau (July 15, 1950–October 9, 1964 | Succeeded by S. P. Verma |
