= Special Frontier Force =

Special covert unit of Indian armed forces

- Insignia of the Special Frontier Force
- Founded: 14 November 1962
- Country: India
- Allegiance: Research & Analysis Wing (R&AW)
- Type: Special Forces; Airborne Infantry
- Size: Classified
- Part of: Cabinet Secretariat
- Headquarters: Chakrata, Uttarakhand, India
- Nickname: Establishment 22, "Phantoms of Chittagong"
- Engagements: Bangladesh Liberation War; Operation Blue Star; Operation Meghdoot; Operation Cactus; Operation Pawan; Kargil War; Operation Rakshak; 2020–2021 China–India skirmishes

Commanders
- Notable commanders: Maj.Gen Sujan Singh Uban

Insignia
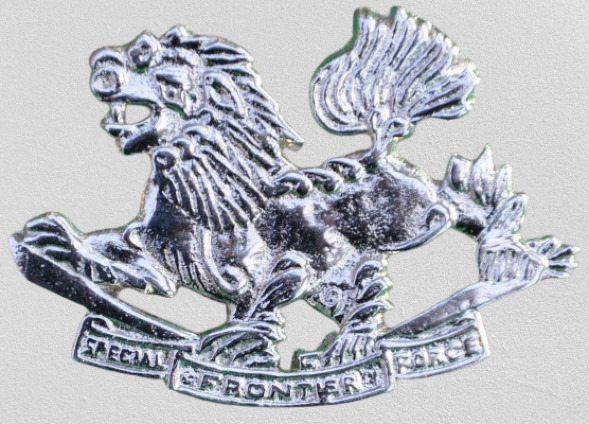
- Badge

Aircraft flown
- Helicopter: HAL Cheetah; HAL Lancer
- Cargo helicopter: Mi-17V-5
- Utility helicopter: HAL Dhruv; HAL Chetak
- Reconnaissance: IAI Searcher II; IAI Heron; DRDO Rustom
- Transport: Gulfstream III; Gulfstream G100

The Special Frontier Force (SFF) is an Indian special forces unit composed primarily of Tibetan refugees and Gurkhas in India. It was established after the Sino-Indian War of 1962 to primarily conduct covert operations behind the Chinese lines in case of another war with China. Later it increased in size and scope of operations.

Throughout its history, SFF has fought in India's major external wars including the Bangladesh Liberation War and the Kargil War. It has also been involved in internal security, including Operation Blue Star and also serving as the "Personal Force" of Prime Minister Indira Gandhi to suppress opposition parties during the state of emergency from 1975 to 1977. It has been part of border operations against China, including the 2020–2021 China–India skirmishes.

Based in Chakrata, Uttarakhand, the force was put under the direct supervision of the Intelligence Bureau (IB), and later the Research and Analysis Wing (R&AW), India's external intelligence agency, and is not part of the Indian Army but functions under their operational control with its own rank structure, charter and training infrastructure. It falls under the authority of the Directorate General on Security in the Cabinet Secretariat headed by an Inspector General (SFF) who is selected from the Major General rank of the Indian Army and who reports directly to the Prime Minister's Office.

== History ==
=== British India precursor ===
Tibetans have been a part of the modern Indian Army for as long as it has existed. During the time of the Great Game, the British Indian Army began to employ Tibetans as spies, intelligence agents, and even covert militia in North India and Tibet proper.

=== 1950s training with IB and CIA ===
At the time of Indian independence, the northern mountain-covered region of India remained the most isolated and strategically overlooked territory of the subcontinent. During the 1950s, the American Central Intelligence Agency (CIA) and the Indian Intelligence Bureau (IB) established Mustang Base in Mustang in Nepal, which trained Tibetans in guerilla warfare. The Mustang rebels brought the 14th Dalai Lama to India during the 1959 Tibetan Rebellion. Former CIA officer John Kennet Knaus who worked in Tibet credited IB Chief Bhola Nath Mullik for SFF formation. According to A Tom Grunfeld, Professor of History at State University of New York, 12,000 Tibetans were trained by United States Army Special Forces and partly funded by Federal government of the United States. Although neither US nor Central Tibetan Administration has any influence on SFF.

Most of the Tibetans recruited were also trained secretly in Okinawa in Kadena Air Base.

=== Formation ===
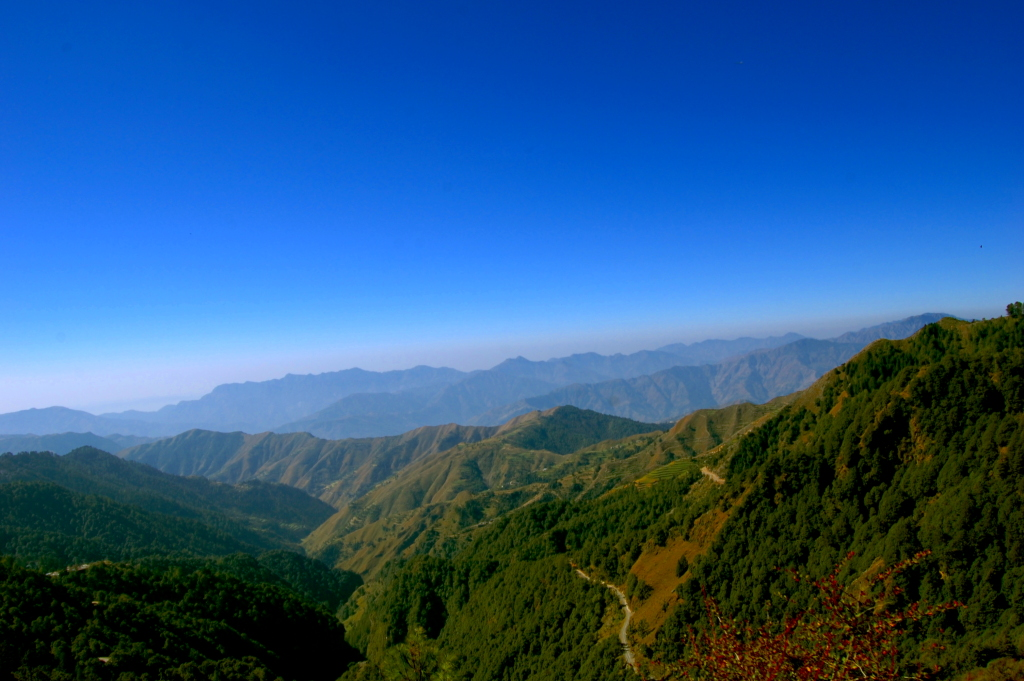
Chakrata, Uttarakhand, is where SFF personnel are trained in stealth combat and scouting techniques.

The idea of raising a specialized force consisting of Tibetan refugees and Tibetan resistance fighters in India against the Chinese was first mooted by General K S Thimayya when he was leading the Indian Army between May 1957 and May 1961. During the Sino-Indian War and towards the end of 1962, after hectic lobbying by the IB Chief Bhola Nath Mullik and World War II veteran Biju Patnaik, the Jawaharlal Nehru government ordered the raising of an elite commando unit and specialised mountain division.

The primary task of SFF is defence against the People's Liberation Army (PLA) Ground Force as well as conducting clandestine intelligence gathering and commando operations along the Chinese border. Chushi Gangdruk leaders were contacted for recruitment of Khampas into this new unit. The initial strength was 5000 men, mostly Khampas who were recruited at its new Mountain Training Facility at Chakrata, 100 km from the city of Dehradun.

Initially known as Establishment 22 within the military and intelligence community due to its first Inspector General, Maj. Gen. Sujan Singh Uban, who commanded the 22nd Mountain Regiment of the Royal Indian Artillery during World War II. Uban also went on to command a Long Range Desert Group Squadron (LRDS) in North Africa during the war. The SFF made its home base at Chakrata, a mountain town in the foothills of the Himalayas home to a large Tibetan refugee population. Starting with a force of 5,000 men, the SFF commenced six months of training in rock climbing and guerrilla warfare. Initial training was conducted by the Intelligence Bureau Special Operations Unit. Both R&AW and the CIA helped in raising the force.

During the same period, the Indian government also formed the Ladakh Scouts and the Nubra Guards paramilitary forces on similar lines. Many SFF members were also absorbed from the Gurkha Rifles. SFF was later incorporated into the Special Services Bureau. By late 1963, inter-service rivalry led to severe criticism by the Indian Army. To prove the SFF's worth, the Inspector General sent 120 men from the SFF on a field exercise, codenamed Garuda, with the Army. The exercise proved to be a dramatic success for the SFF and the Army was now less inclined to criticise the force. However the force faced other problems such as mass desertions by Tibetans. The Tibetan recruits found that smuggling was a much easier way of making money than risking their lives along the border.

In 1964, the SFF, led by the Inspector General, began its airborne training at Agra. The SFF then began its own airborne training program at Sarsawa Air Force Station. In 1967, Establishment 22 was expanded and renamed into Special Frontier Force. In 1968 with the help of Aviation Research Centre (ARC), SFF were provided with airlift facilities and became fully airborne-qualified with a dedicated mountain and jungle warfare unit.

=== CIA support and pull-out ===
The SFF's weapons were all provided by the US and consisted mainly of M-1, M-2 and M-3 sub-machine guns. Heavy weapons were not provided. The US government pulled out the CIA from the training program as relations with India soured in the early 1970s during the period of Cold War, with the Sino-Soviet split and Richard Nixon's 1972 visit to China for improving the bilateral relationship. The unit conducted limited cross-border reconnaissance missions as well as highly classified joint operations with the CIA in 1965 on Mount Nanda Devi in the Himalayas.

== Battalions and composition ==
The SFF has a total of six battalions called 1 Vikas, 2 Vikas, 3 Vikas, 5 Vikas, 6 Vikas, and 7 Vikas. Each battalion has around 800 troopers. The six battalions are commanded by Indian Army officers of colonel rank. At least five other Indian Army officers are in a battalion. At the helm of SFF is the Inspector General (SFF), an officer of Major General rank. The Special Group, or 4 Vikas, functions under a separate chain of command under the R&AW. Historically, by the late 1960s, the SFF was organised into six battalions for administrative purposes. In the past, each battalion, consisting of six companies, was commanded by a Tibetan who had a rank equivalent to a lieutenant colonel in the Indian Army. A Tibetan major or captain commanded each company, which was the primary unit used in operations. After the 1980s, the practice of giving Indian Army commissions to Tibetans was discontinued.

Ethnically, the unit is a mixture of Tibetans and Gurkhas from Nepal. The Tibetan troopers are recruited from the dwindling population of Tibetans in India, which stood at 85,000 in 2018. The flow of Tibetans joining SFF has slowed due to the declining population of Tibetans, leading to a more ethnically mixed unit. Gurkhas have been recruited to the SFF since 1965. Tibetans currently serve as soldiers and non-commissioned officers and were in the past given officer commissions. Women are also recruited for specialized operations as well as in signal and medical companies.

== Ranks ==
The Special Frontier Force retains a military rank insignia system distinct from other Indian paramilitary organizations.

Officers

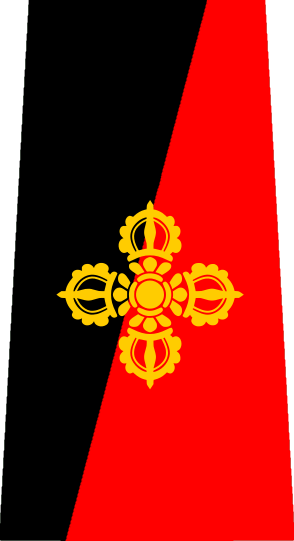
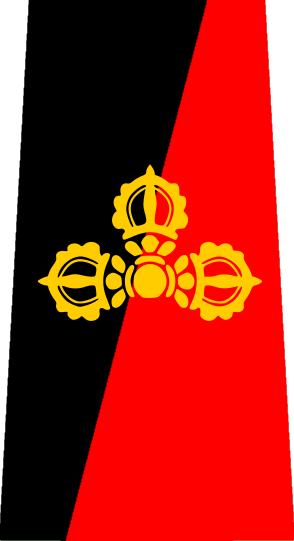
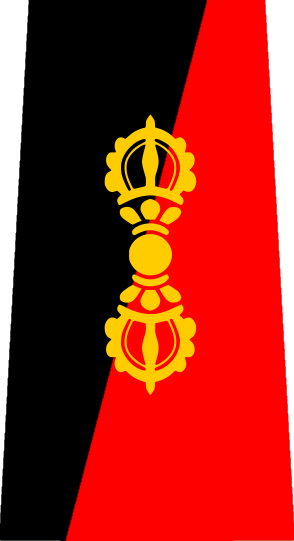
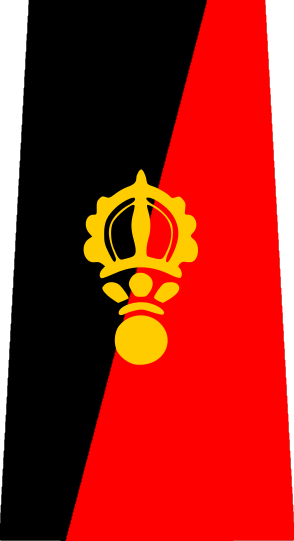
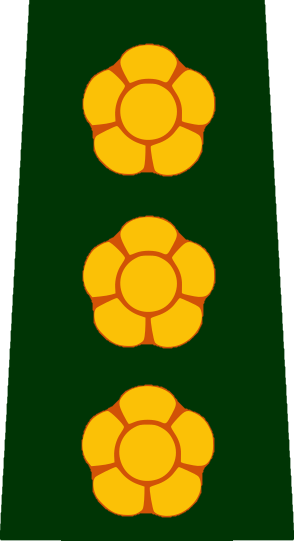
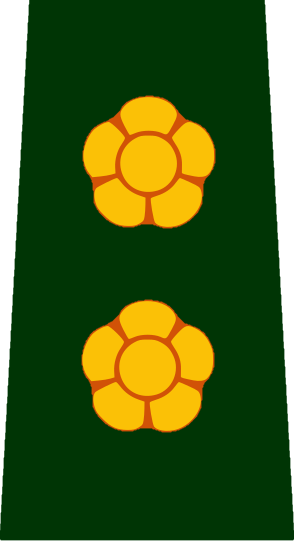
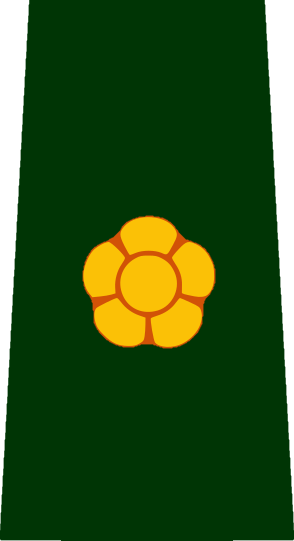
Rank group	General / flag officers	Senior officers			Junior officers
Special Frontier Force
Special Frontier Force	Brigadier	Colonel	Lieutenant colonel	Major	Captain	First Lieutenant	Second Lieutenant

Personnel below officers rank

Rank group	Subordinate Officers (SO)			Non commissioned officers (NCO)			Enlisted
Special Frontier Force							No insignia
Special Frontier Force	Subedar Major	Subedar	Naib Subedar	Havildar	Naik	Lance Naik	Sepoy

== Operations ==
SFF was raised with covert operations in mind, mainly along the Indo-China border; however, SFF has been fielded by the R&AW and the Indian government in various covert and overt operation theatres. Deputy leader Tenzin Norbu was posthumously honored by 119 Infantry Battalion of Territorial Army from Assam Regiment and awarded a memento from the Government of India, signed by Prime Minister Narendra Modi for his service at Siachen glacier Leader Tenzin Norbu honoured posthumously by Indian govt. |

=== Pakistan ===
==== Indo-Pakistani War of 1971 ====
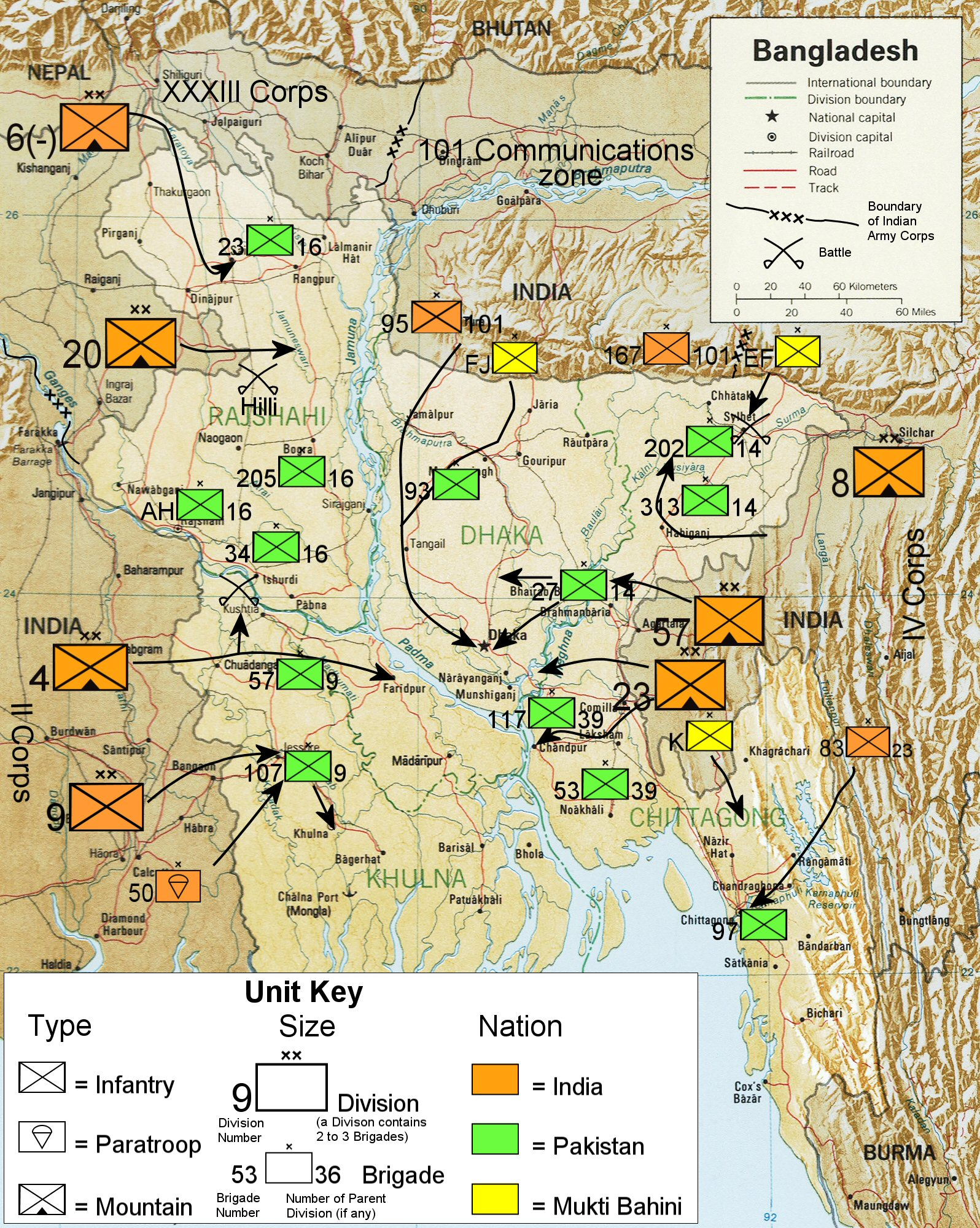
Illustration showing military units and troop movements during the war

SFF was part of major combat operations during the Bangladesh Liberation War. In April 1971, Eastern Command initiated Operation Instruction 52. SFF was tasked to conduct unconventional warfare, rally the people of East Pakistan in support of the liberation movement and damage the logistics capability of Pakistan Army. From late October to November 1971, elements of the force were sent to Mizoram. Around 3,000 members from SFF Task Force was deployed to conduct pre-emptive strike to support the Indian Army formations along the Chittagong Hill Tracts and to train the local underground unit called Mujib Bahini.

With cross-border attacks becoming more frequent, SFF was ordered to attack the Chittagong Hill Tracts. The Bangladeshi campaign was designated Operation Mountain Eagle, and SFF members were given Bulgarian AK-47s and US-made carbines. This operation saw the first Dapon, the Tibetan equivalent of a Brigadier, in command of part of the SFF Task Force.

With war imminent, SFF successfully executed several mission plans that included the destruction of the Kaptai Dam and other bridges of strategic value. The Inspector General also urged that the SFF be used to capture the second largest city, Chittagong, but the idea found no support among military planners in New Delhi since the unit lacked artillery support and airlift capabilities to conduct a mission of such magnitude. After three weeks of border fighting, the SFF divided its six battalions into three columns and moved into East Pakistan on 3 December 1971. The Tibetans were given mortars and recoilless rifles and two Mil Mi-4 helicopters of the Indian Air Force, and captured several villages in the Chittagong Hill Tracts. The air-operations were handled by Aviation Research Centre (ARC) at Balasore.

On the night of 14 November 1971 in the forests of Chittagong Hill Tracts, Brigadier Dhondup Gyatotsang during Operation Mountain Eagle was killed in a firefight with Special Service Group of the Pakistan Army. With the fall of Dhaka and Lieutenant General A.A.K. Niazi surrendering on 16 December 1971, SFF had lost 49 men and nearly 190 were wounded. The SFF later joined with Seaborne Expedition Task Force consisting of 2nd Artillery Brigade, 1st Battalion 3rd Gorkha Rifles, 11 Battalion Bihar Regiment that was able to block potential escape route for East Pakistani forces into Burma. They also halted members of Pakistan's 97th Independent Brigade and 2nd Commando Battalion at the Chittagong Hill Tracts. For their bravery and courage, 580 SFF Task Force members were awarded cash prizes by the Union Government of India. Their swift covert capabilities won the force the nickname Phantoms of Chittagong.

==== Kargil War ====
SFF participated in Kargil War for which the unit had received letter of commendation from Prime Minister Atal Bihari Vajpayee.

=== China ===
==== Cold War ====
In 2004/08/07, intelligence reports kept indicating that China was preparing to test a nuclear weapon at its Lop Nor nuclear installation in Xinjiang. On 16 October 1964 China did indeed test a nuclear weapon in Xinjiang. It was expected, but not enough details were known. Later in November 1964, the CIA launched a U2 flight out of Aviation Research Centre (ARC)'s Charbatia Air Base in Orissa, but its return turned out to be something of a mishap. The Lockheed U-2 overshot the runway and got stuck in slushy ground caused by heavy rain in the monsoon. Getting it unstuck and out of India without being noticed by the Indian press, then even more subject to socialist influences and hence antagonistic to the US, was another clandestine operation. This gave all concerned quite a scare and it was decided to rely on other technical means.

The CIA therefore decided to launch an electronic intelligence (ELINT) operation along with R&AW and to track China's nuclear tests and monitor its missile launches. The operation, in the garb of a mountaineering expedition to Nanda Devi, involved celebrated Indian climber M S Kohli who, along with operatives of SFF and CIA (most notably Jim Rhyne, a veteran STOL pilot), was to emplace a permanent ELINT device, a transceiver powered by a plutonium battery, that could detect and report data on future nuclear tests carried out by China. The plan to install a snooping device was devised far away in Washington, D.C., in the offices of the National Geographic Society. Barry Bishop, a photographer with the magazine, interested General Curtis LeMay of the United States Air Force in the idea.

The actual efforts called for the placement of a permanent ELINT device powered by a nuclear SNAP 19C power pack fuel cell. The first attempt to place this device on Nanda Devi, by a Kohli-led SFF team under the cover of a mountaineering expedition, failed as the team had to retreat in the face of adverse conditions and left the device in a small unmarked mountain cave after having hauled the device just short of the 25,645-foot peak. When another Kohli-led expedition returned the following year to recover the device, it was found to be missing. In the meantime the Chinese not only kept testing not only nuclear weapons but also ballistic missiles at regular intervals. The urgency to gather information was never greater.

Another mission was launched in 1967 to place a similar device on the Nanda Kot. This mission was successful but a couple of years later another problem cropped up: snow would pile up over the antenna and render it blind. So Kohli and a SFF team were sent once again to bring it down; this time they retrieved it successfully. In October 1967 the Chinese began testing an ICBM capable of reaching targets 6000 miles away. There was renewed urgency to find out more. So SFF mountaineers went off on one more mission in December 1969 to successfully place a gas-powered device on an undisclosed mountain, supposedly in Chinese-controlled areas. However, by the following year, the US had the first generation of TRW reconnaissance satellites under Defense Support Program in place and did not have to rely on the old ELINT devices.

==== 2020–2021 China–India skirmishes ====
During the conflict with troops from PLA, Indian Army initiated Operation Snow Leopard. The SFF formed the core team and conducted joint operation with Indian Army around Gurung Hill, Rezang La including the capture of heights in South Pangong Tso range.

In another incident, an official statement by the Indian Army read: "Indian troops pre-empted this PLA activity on the southern bank of Pangong Tso, undertook measures to strengthen our positions and thwart Chinese intentions to unilaterally change facts on ground". During this operation, on 1 September 2020, company leader Nyima Tenzin died in a landmine blast while undertaking a reconnaissance mission along the line of actual control.

On 26 January 2021, Tsering Norbu was awarded "Mention in dispatches" for his contribution and successful execution of Operation Snow Leopard.

== See also ==
- Cabinet Secretariat
- Tibetans
