= Aviation Research Centre =

Imagery intelligence organisation of India

- Emblem of the Government of India

Agency overview
- Formed: September 7, 1963
- Employees: Classified
- Annual budget: Classified
- Agency executive: Special Secretary (R)
- Parent department: Cabinet Secretariat
- Parent agency: Research and Analysis Wing (R&AW)

The Aviation Research Centre (ARC) is India's imagery intelligence organisation, under the Research and Analysis Wing (R&AW). It started functioning in November 1962, in the wake of the Sino-Indian War, as an extension of the Intelligence Bureau, but placed under the Ministry of External Affairs.

It was formally created on 7 September 1963, with R. N. Kao as Director and Acting Group Captain, Lal Singh Grewal (later, Vice Chief of the Indian Air Force) as Operations Manager at the Charbatia Air Base (code named Oak Tree 1). It was later moved to the Prime Minister's Secretariat, and in February 1965, along with Special Frontier Force and Special Service Bureau (now Sashastra Seema Bal), was brought under the Directorate General of Security in the Cabinet Secretariat (this organisation was created in late 1964 with B. N. Mullick as DG, Security; the post was later shifted to the chief of R&AW upon its constitution in 1968).

One of its most influential Directors was Prof H.B. Mohanti. ARC was initially a temporary and ad hoc organisation, but was made permanent in 1971. Over the years, ARC had grown into a large operation and flies a large and varied fleet that until recently included the high-flying Mach 3 capable Mikoyan-Gurevich MiG-25.

== Inventory ==
The ARC began operations in 1962 with a Helio Twin Courier loaned from the USAF. ARC operated fixed-wing transport aircraft like Russian IL-76s and AN-32s. It also had General Dynamics Gulfstream III and Global 5000 jets. The helicopter inventory comprises Russian Mil Mi-17s and a mix of locally built Cheetahs (modified French Alouette IIs) and Chetaks (Alouette IIIs). The MIG-25 (also christened as Foxbat by NATO) was used for high altitude reconnaissance until being decommissioned in 2006. ARC was also believed to be the first department to induct the indigenously built 'Pilotless Target Aircraft' (PTA) Lakshya.

Lakshya is equipped with advanced support system to help it perform tactful aerial exploration in the battlefield, including target acquisition. The 6-foot-long (1.8 m) Lakshya is fitted with a digitally controlled engine that can be operated from the ground using a remote. Lakshya had been designed by Aeronautical Development Establishment, Bangalore. Lakshya is a surface/ship launched high subsonic reusable aerial target system, remotely piloted from ground. It provides training to the gun and missile crew and to air defence pilots for weapon engagement.

As of 2024, ARC operates the Special Mission Aircraft fleet of the Indian Air Force like Boeing 707-337C Phalcon, Global 5000 and Gulfstream III and various drones of different capabilities and capacities.

== Bases ==
According to a report from Globalsecurity.org, the Research and Analysis Wing (R&AW) Aviation Research Centre operated bases at Charbatia Air Base in Choudwar, Cuttack district (largest base); Sarsawa Air Base near Saharanpur on the Uttar Pradesh-Haryana border; Dum Duma Air Base near Tinsukia in Assam; Palam Air Base in Delhi; and the Farkhor Air Base, the only Indian military airbase situated in a foreign country, at Farkhor/Ayni in Tajikistan.

In 2018 the Duma Duma Air Base was identified as one of 15 disused airfields that could be transferred to other public agencies. At the time it was being looked after by the Defense Estate Organization.

== Function ==
An armoured personnel carrier (BMP) being loaded on an IL-76 at Ladakh

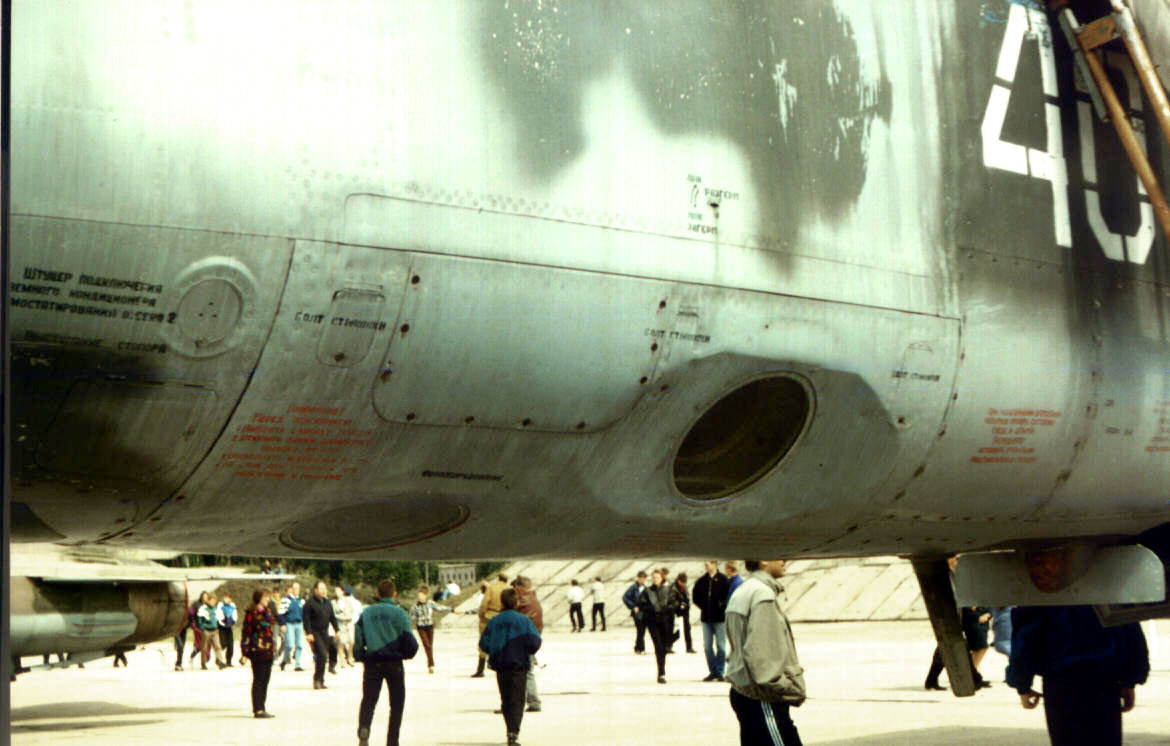
Cameras of MiG-25RB for aerial surveillance

Aerial surveillance, SIGINT operations, photo reconnaissance flights (PHOTINT), monitoring of borders, imagery intelligence (IMINT) were the main functions of the Aviation Research Centre (ARC).

The aircraft were fitted with state-of-the-art electronic surveillance equipment and long range cameras capable of taking pictures of targets from very high altitudes. ARC also took the responsibility along with the IAF to transport Special Frontier Force (SFF) commandos from their trans-location at Sarsawa, 250 km north of New Delhi, though the SFF's own base is in Chakrata in Uttarakhand.

== Project 596 ==
The United States supplied surveillance equipment to Aviation Research Centre to spy on China's nuclear programme and naval assets from 1962.

== Kargil War ==
In 1999 during the Kargil War, after the Pakistani intrusion was detected, ARC was tasked to check if the Pakistanis had indeed crossed the Line of Control to the Indian side and violated the border agreement. A number of missions were flown by the ARC on request from the Indian Army and the PMO.

Senior officials of the Indian armed forces including the Chief of Air Staff and Chief of Army staff highly commended the work done by ARC, quoting "The electronic and optical information provided by the ARC before and during the actual operations was of immense value to the conduct of air strikes." Also the K. Subrahmanyam committee report into the Kargil war observed that "No intelligence failures had been attributed on account of functioning of RAW and ARC. However, certain equipment inadequacies were highlighted such as satellite imagery and UAVs".

== Proposal of dissolution ==
In 2012, the Naresh Chandra Committee on national security recommended merger of ARC with R&AW, in view of ARC's turf wars with NTRO and DIA. As a part of larger reforms, backed by NSA Ajit Doval, Aviation Research Centre (ARC) was proposed to be shut down in 2015 and ARC's assets were to be divided between the National Technical Research Organisation and the Indian Air Force.

However, it was not carried out and the agency continues to exist.

== Current status ==
Previously, ARC was part of the Directorate General of Security, along with three other organisations, viz., Special Service Bureau, Special Frontier Force and Chief Inspectorate of Armaments. Whereas R&AW is a wing of the Cabinet Secretariat, with secretariat-style rank structure at Headquarters (Secretary, Special Secretary, Additional Secretary etc.), DGS was an attached office. Secretary, R&AW, held, ex-officio, the post of Director General of Security. (Note: It is not always so. When S. E. Joshi became Secretary, R&AW in 1986, he superseded R. T. Nagrani, Principal Director, DGS, who was close to retirement. So Nagrani was made DG (Security). After Nagrani's retirement, the post came back to the R&AW chief. Again, when Rajinder Khanna became Secretary, R&AW in December 2014, his batchmate, Arvind Saxena was laterally shifted as Special Secretary, ARC. The post of DG (Security) was kept vacant and Saxena was put under the NSA. Khanna was made DG (Security) in May 2015 and Saxena became Member, UPSC.) Below him was the Principal Director, of Special DG or Special Secretary rank. SSB and ARC had their respective Directors (Additional DG or Additional Secretary rank), SFF had an Inspector General (Major General rank) and CIOA had a Chief Inspector (Lieutenant Colonel rank). In January 2001, DGS was split and SSB and CIOA were shifted to the Ministry of Home Affairs. The post of Principal Director, DGS, was also moved alongside as Director General, SSB. Thereafter, the post of Director, ARC was upgraded as Special Secretary, ARC (Note: Ravinder Singh "Billy" Bedi, a former Army officer and Vir Chakra awardee in 1965 and later a RAS officer of 1966 batch, headed ARC from 1997 to 2003, first as Director and then as Special Secretary. He got superseded as Secretary, R&AW by Chandra Dev Sahay, an IPS (later RAS) officer of 1967 batch and moved out, to become the founder chairman of NTRO.) and Head of department, SFF, but he continued to report to DG (Security) (except in case of Arvind Saxena, who reported to the NSA).

Subsequently, in 2021, ARC was removed as a separate organisation from the second schedule of the Right to Information Act and included with R&AW as its technical wing.

== See also ==
- Research and Analysis Wing
- Farkhor Air Base
- Indian Air Force
- National Technical Research Organisation
- Intelligence Bureau
- Indian Intelligence Community
