= R. N. Ravi =

Governor of West Bengal

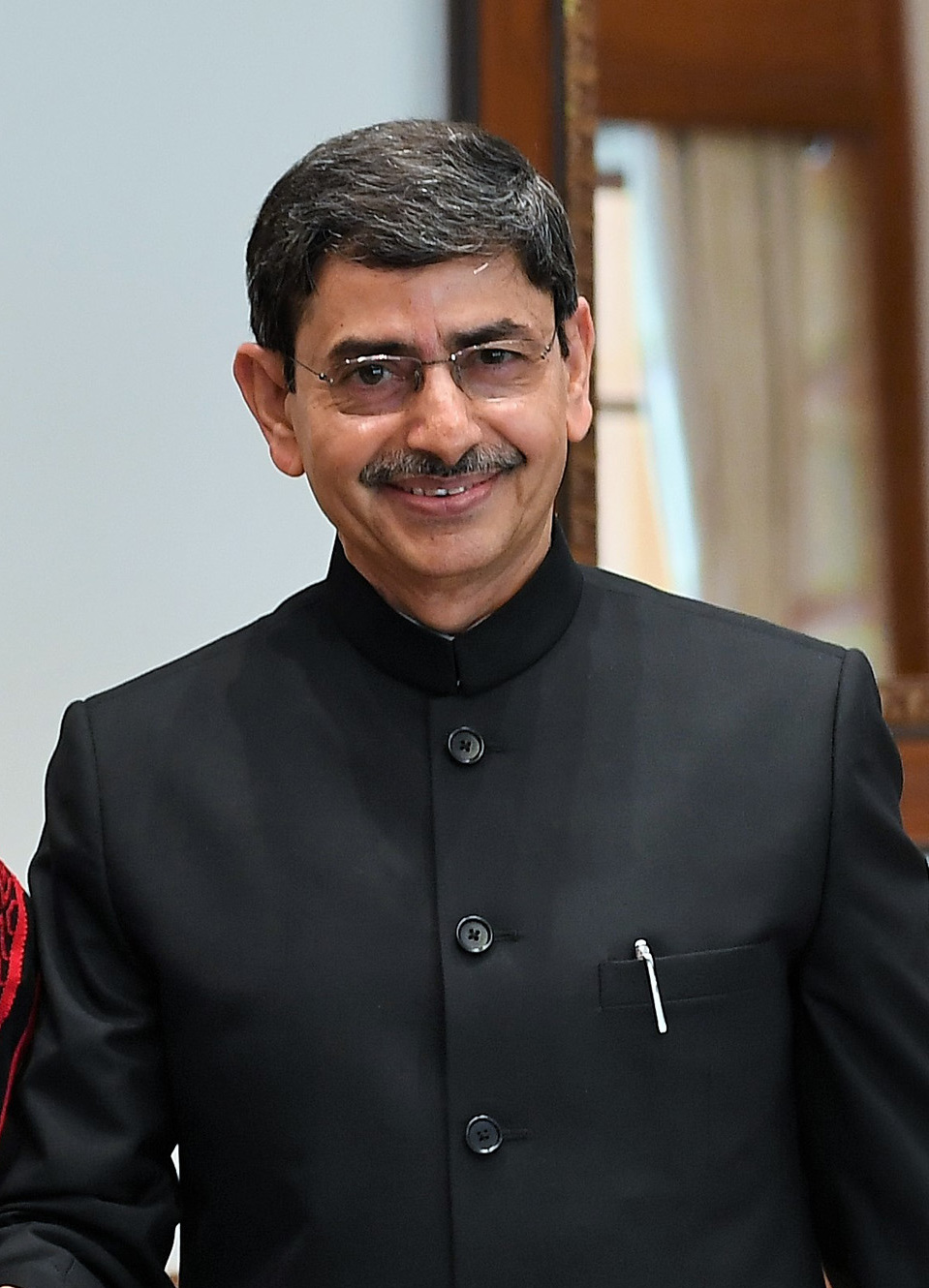
- R. N. Ravi as Governor of Nagaland

31st Governor of West Bengal
- Incumbent
- Assumed office 12 March 2026
- Chief Minister: Mamata Banerjee; Suvendu Adhikari
- Preceded by: C. V. Ananda Bose

23rd Governor of Tamil Nadu
- In office 18 September 2021 – 12 March 2026
- Chief Minister: M. K. Stalin
- Preceded by: Banwarilal Purohit
- Succeeded by: Rajendra Arlekar

Governor of Nagaland
- In office 1 August 2019 – 18 September 2021
- Chief Minister: Neiphiu Rio
- Preceded by: Padmanabha Acharya
- Succeeded by: Jagdish Mukhi

Governor of Meghalaya
- In office 18 December 2019 – 26 January 2020
- Chief Minister: Conrad Sangma
- Preceded by: Tathagata Roy
- Succeeded by: Tathagata Roy

Deputy National Security Advisor of India
- In office 5 October 2018 – 31 July 2019
- National Security Advisor: Ajit Doval
- Preceded by: Arvind Gupta
- Succeeded by: Dattatray Padsalgikar

Interlocutor of Naga Peace Accord
- In office September 2014 – March 2022
- Preceded by: Office established
- Succeeded by: A. K. Mishra

Special Director of the Intelligence Bureau
- In office 2010–2012

Personal details
- Born: Ravindra Narayana Ravi; 3 April 1952 (age 74) Patna, Bihar, India
- Occupation: Politician; bureaucrat; spymaster

Ravindra Narayana Ravi (born 3 April 1952) is an Indian politician serving as governor of West Bengal since 2026. Earlier, he served as the Governor of Nagaland, Meghalaya, and Tamil Nadu. He is a former bureaucrat and a spymaster, who held various positions with the Government of India.

Born in Patna in Bihar, Ravi joined the Indian Police Service in 1976 after a brief stint as a journalist. He served in the Central Bureau of Investigation and Intelligence Bureau. He was appointed the chairman of the Joint Intelligence Committee in 2014. In October 2018, he became the deputy National Security Advisor.

After retiring from his bureaucrat career, Ravi was appointed the governor of Nagaland in August 2019 and served till September 2021. He also held additional responsibility as the governor of Meghalaya from December 2019 to January 2020 when then governor Tathagata Roy went on a leave. On 18 September 2021, Ravi took charge as the governor of Tamil Nadu. In March 2026, he was transferred as the governor of West Bengal.

Ravi's tenure as the governor of Tamil Nadu has seen repeated face-offs with the elected government headed by chief minister M. K. Stalin. He was criticised as being dictatorial by Stalin, due to his reluctance and delay in giving assent to various bills passed by the state assembly. The assembly later passed a resolution urging the union government to set time limits for governors to give assent to bills. In April 2025, the Supreme Court mandated time limits for governors in a landmark judgement in the case brought by the state against the governor. However, in August 2025, a constitutional bench of the court, in a reply to the questions raised by the president, affirmed that no time limit is mandated for the president or governor in the Constitution of India.

== Early life and career ==
Ravindra Narayana Ravi was born in Patna, Bihar on 3 April 1952. He completed his masters degree in physics in 1974. After a brief stint in journalism, he joined the Indian Police Service in 1976 and was allotted to Kerala cadre, where he served for over a decade.

Ravi was later appointed to the Central Bureau of Investigation, and led anti-corruption cases against organised criminal gangs, including mining mafias. He later served in the Intelligence Bureau, where he was involved in theatres of insurgency in Jammu and Kashmir, the Northeast India, and Naxal-affected regions. He also served as the special director of the Intelligence Bureau from 2010 to 2012. After retiring from government service in 2012, he wrote opinion columns in newspapers.

== Political career ==
In 2014, Ravi was appointed the chairman of the Joint Intelligence Committee. He was appointed the deputy National Security Advisor of India on 5 October 2018. He also served as the interlocutor for the talks between the Government of India and National Socialist Council of Nagaland (NSCN) from 2014 to 2021.

== Governorships (2019–present) ==
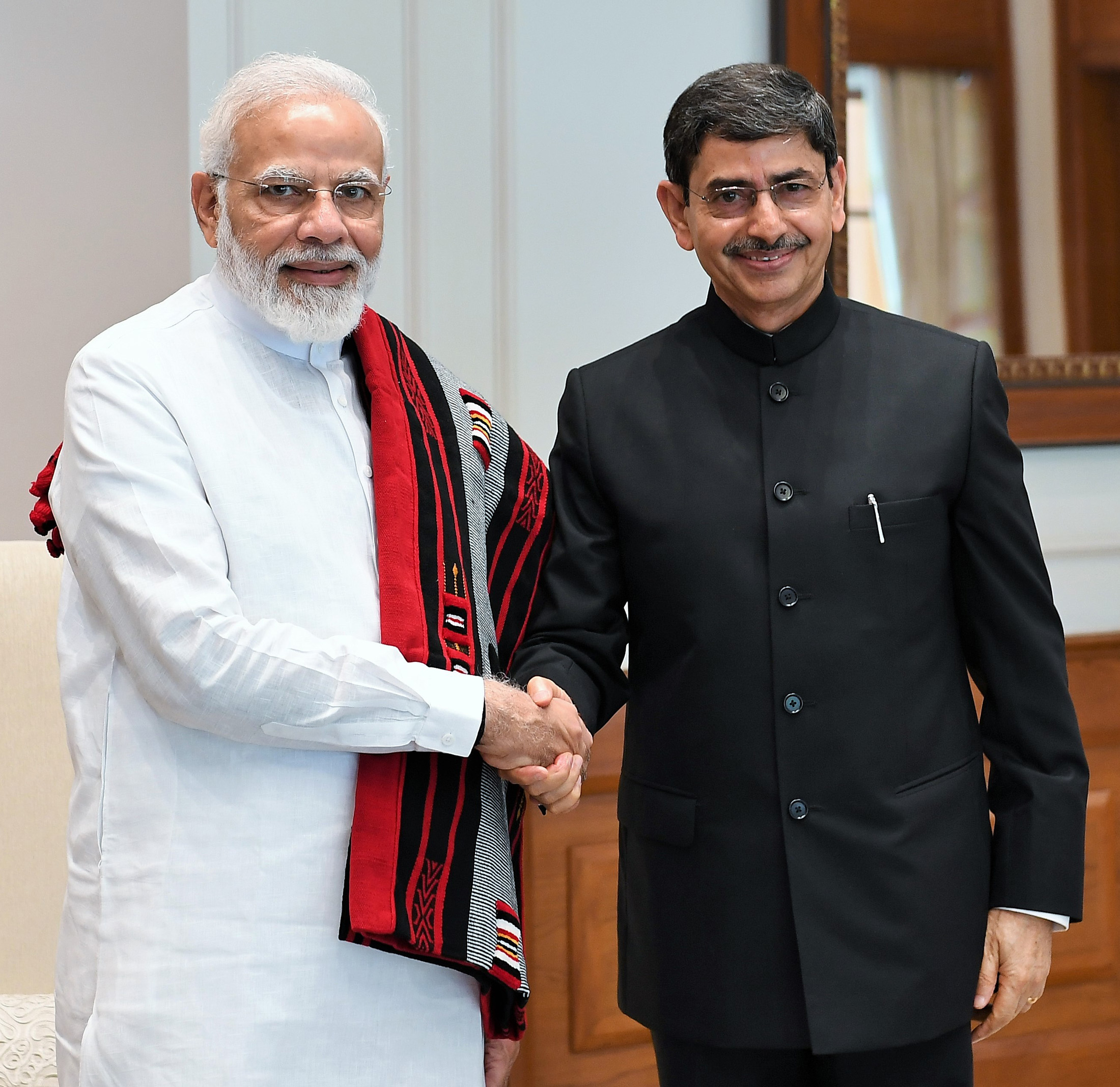
The Governor of Nagaland, R. N. Ravi calls on Prime Minister Narendra Modi on 8 August 2019.

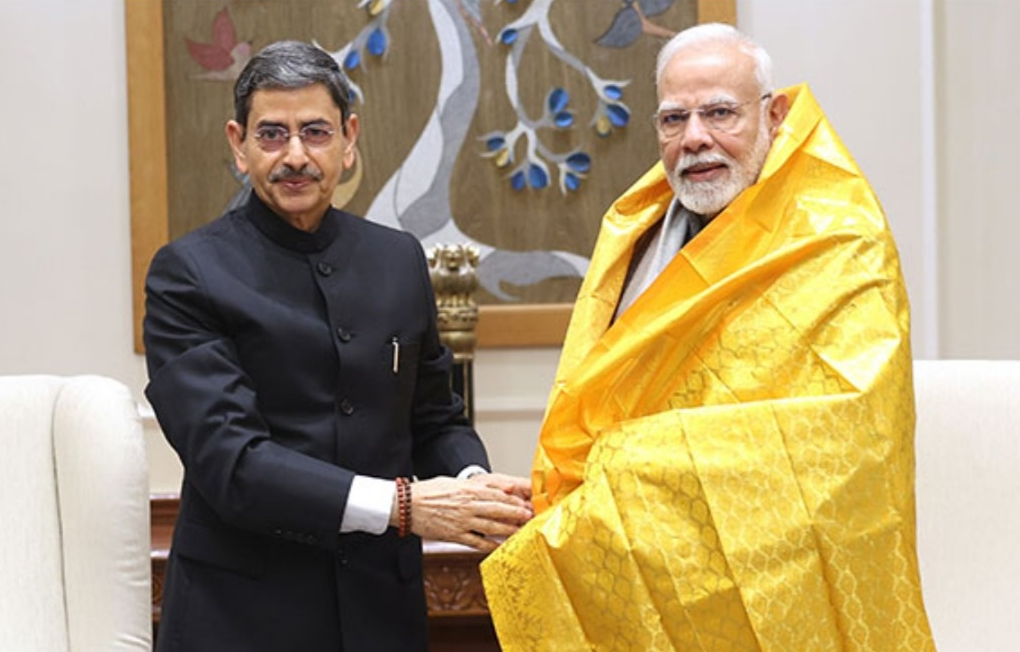
The Governor of Tamil Nadu, R. N. Ravi, calls on Prime Minister Narendra Modi on 24 December 2024.

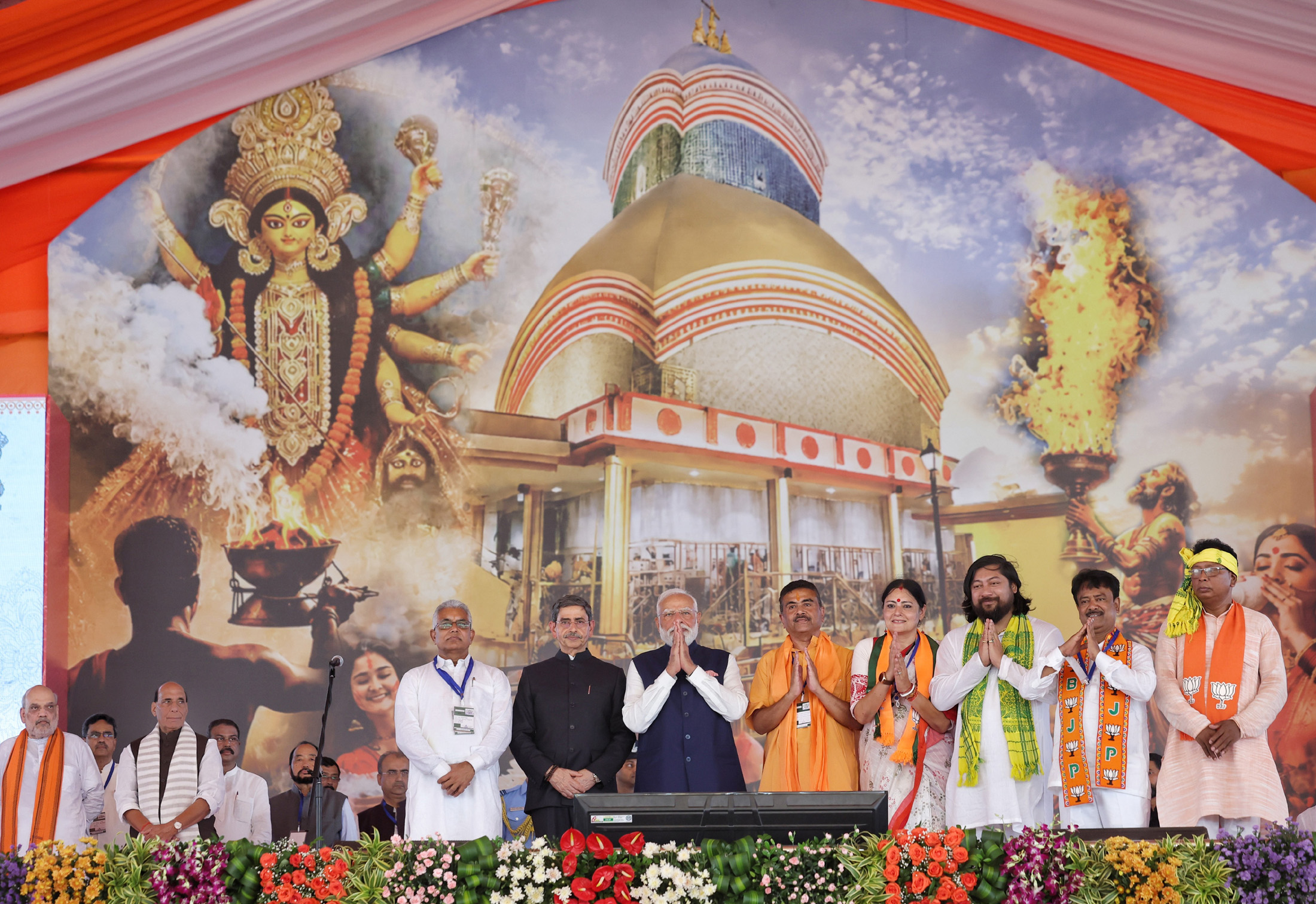
The Governor of West Bengal, R. N. Ravi at the swearing-in ceremony of the new government formed in West Bengal run by Chief Minister Suvendu Adhikari on 9 May 2026.

=== Governor of Nagaland (2019–2021) ===
Ravi was appointed the Governor of Nagaland on 20 July 2019 by the president Ram Nath Kovind. During his tenure, the Nagaland Peace Accord was signed between the Indian government and NSCN in August 2015. He had a fallout with NSCN in 2020 after an alleged misunderstanding and subsequent manipulation of the agreement by him. Later, the NSCN asked for his removal as an interlocutor. According to media reports, Ravi was perceived to be targeting the NSCN while being soft on its rival Naga political outfit, consisting of seven extremist groups.

After his proposed appointment as the Governor of Tamil Nadu in 2021, the Nationalist Democratic Progressive Party president Chingwang Konyak said the Nagaland government was not happy with the way Ravi functioned and said he interfered in the affairs of a popular government. The Kohima Press Club boycotted the state farewell organised for Ravi to show resentment since Ravi had refused to interact with the media several times.

=== Governor of Meghalaya (2019–2020) ===
Ravi was given additional charge as the Governor of Meghalaya, after the incumbent governor Tathagata Roy went on a temporary leave. He was in charge for 39 days from 18 December 2019 to 26 January 2020, and handed the reins back to Roy, who came back and took charge on 27 January 2020.

=== Governor of Tamil Nadu (2021–2026) ===
On 9 September 2021, Ravi was appointed the governor of Tamil Nadu, and he took charge on 18 September 2021. While he was welcomed by Tamil Nadu chief minister and Dravida Munnetra Kazhagam (DMK) chief M. K. Stalin, his appointment was questioned by allies of the DMK such as the Congress and Viduthalai Chiruthaigal Katchi, who claimed an ulterior motive in his appointment.

During his tenure, Ravi had multiple face-offs with the Tamil Nadu government. In May 2022, he had kept 21 bills passed in the Tamil Nadu assembly on hold. He was criticised by politicians in Tamil Nadu for his delay in approving the bills and interference in the functioning of the government. On 4 February 2022, he returned the bill seeking exemption from NEET to the speaker of the Tamil Nadu assembly, 142 days after it was passed in the assembly. The assembly subsequently re-adopted the bill, and forwarded it to the governor, who then reserved it for the consideration of the president. The president later declined assent to the bill. In April 2022, the Supreme Court questioned Ravi's action to refer the Rajiv Gandhi assassination convict A. G. Perarivalan's remission plea to the president as threatening the federal structure of government.

In January 2023, Ravi suggested that Tamilakam would be a more suitable name for the state of Tamil Nadu and criticised that the ruling political parties in the state have been regressive in the past fifty years. His remarks were condemned by leaders of various political parties including the ruling DMK, the opposition All India Anna Dravida Munnetra Kazhagam, and other regional parties, while being welcomed by the Bharatiya Janata Party. Protests were organised by some college students against his remarks.

After the governor's speech in the assembly on 9 January 2023, the state government claimed that Ravi omitted select words such as women empowerment, secularism, self-respect, and portions on B. R. Ambedkar and Dravidian leaders from the speech submitted by the state government to the governor's office. As per convention, the governor was to read the speech prepared by the state government. Chief minister Stalin moved a resolution requesting that the speaker to relax the state assembly rules to record only the speech prepared by the state administration and strike out any passages that the governor inserted or omitted. The motion was passed by the assembly, and the original speech prepared by the state government was documented.

Ravi walked off from the assembly in the middle of the chief minister's speech on the resolution, before the assembly proceedings were closed. On 12 February 2024, Ravi again declined to read the entire customary address provided by the state government, except for the introductory parts, and walked off from the assembly as the speaker recited the Tamil rendition of the prepared address. Later in the day, a press release from the governor state that he cannot abide by the speech provided by the state government since he did not agree with many of its excerpts on "moral and factual reasons", and stated it would be "constitutional travesty" if he accepted and orated the speech.

In June 2023, Ravi issued a communique that dismissed V. Senthil Balaji from the state's council of ministers, after Balaji's arrest by the Enforcement Directorate in a money laundering case. His announcement was criticised by several political parties, and chief minister Stalin responded that the governor does not have the authority to dismiss a minister without the recommendation of the elected government and indicated that the decision would be challenged legally. However, the governor withdrew the order on the same day, and stated that he was advised by the union home ministry to seek the opinion of the attorney general and acted accordingly. In April 2025, Balaji resigned from the cabinet after an ultimatum by the Supreme Court of India.

Ravi has been criticised as being dictatorial by Stalin. Due to his reluctance and delay in giving assent to various bills passed by the state assembly, the assembly passed a resolution urging the union government to set time limits for governors to give assent to bills. On 7 April 2025, Ravi stated that if the governor does not approve a bill, it indicates that the "bill is dead". The statement drew criticism from Stalin and P. Chidambaram.

In April 2025, in the case of The State of Tamil Nadu v. The Governor of Tamil Nadu, the Supreme Court delivered a landmark judgement mandating time limits for governors to act on bills passed by state legislatures. The court ruled that the prolonged inaction on the ten bills by governor Ravi before referring them to the president, after their re-passage by the legislature, was unconstitutional. The court also cleared the pending bills under the provisions of Article 142. However, on 20 November 2025, a five-judge constitutional bench of the Supreme Court issued an advisory on the April 2025 case. The advisory was based on the 14 constitutional questions raised by the president to the court. The bench confirmed that no timeline is stipulated in the Constitution of India for the president or governors to take action on the bills. It further opined that the governors cannot sit on the bills indefinitely, and the governor has three options: to grant assent, to reserve it for the consideration of the president, or to withhold assent and return the bill to the assembly for reconsideration.

On 12 April 2025, Ravi reportedly asked students to chant Jai Shri Ram during an event held at Thiagarajar College of Engineering in Madurai. The State Platform for Common School System, an association of educationists and activists, wrote to the president Droupadi Murmu demanding Ravi's removal from office based on the allegation that his actions violated Article 159 of the Indian Constitution, which pertains to the oath of office taken by governors. Leaders from the ruling DMK and its allies also condemned the incident, stating that it was inappropriate for a constitutional authority to make religious exhortations at an educational institution.

On 20 January 2026, Ravi declined to deliver the customary address provided by the state government and walked out of the assembly. The governor's office later released a statement citing that not being allowed to speak, not playing the National Anthem at the beginning of the session, and falsified claims in the address prepared by the state government as the reasons for the governor's walkout. Chief minister Stalin condemned the governor's move and said that it violates the house protocol and is a disrespect to the assembly.

=== Governor of West Bengal (2026–Incumbent) ===
On 5 March 2026, Ravi was appointed the Governor of West Bengal succeeding C. V. Ananda Bose, while Rajendra Arlekar, the Governor of Kerala, was given additional charge of Tamil Nadu.

Political offices
Preceded by Padmanabha Acharya	Governor of Nagaland; 1 August 2019 - 17 September 2021	Succeeded by Jagdish Mukhi
Preceded by Tathagata Roy	Governor of Meghalaya; 18 December 2019 - 26 January 2020	Succeeded by Tathagata Roy
Preceded by Banwarilal Purohit	Governor of Tamil Nadu; 18 September 2021 - 11 March 2026	Succeeded by Rajendra Arlekar
Preceded by C. V. Ananda Bose	Governor of West Bengal; 12 March 2026	Incumbent
