= M. K. Narayanan =

Indian bureaucrat and statesman

Mayankodu Kelath Narayanan IPS (Retd.)
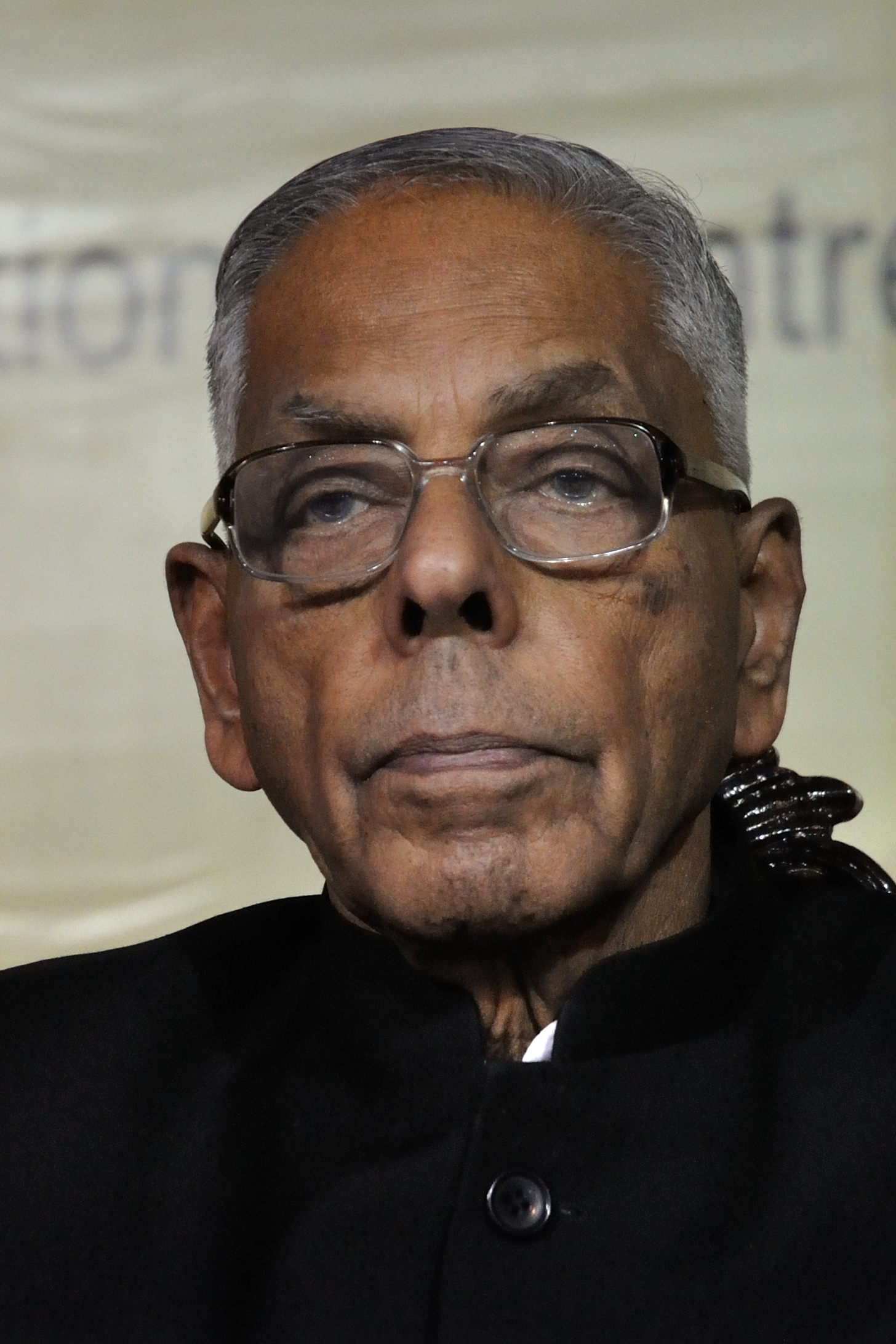

18th Governor of West Bengal
- In office 24 January 2010 – 30 June 2014
- Chief Minister: Buddhadeb Bhattacharjee; Mamata Banerjee
- Preceded by: Devanand Konwar (additional charge)
- Succeeded by: D. Y. Patil (additional charge)

Acting Governor of Sikkim
- In office 7 Apr 2010 – 30 Apr 2010

3rd National Security Advisor of India
- In office 3 January 2005 – 23 January 2010
- Prime Minister: Manmohan Singh
- Preceded by: J. N. Dixit
- Succeeded by: Shivshankar Menon

Director of Intelligence Bureau
- In office January 1991 - February 1992
- In office April 1987 – December 1989

Personal details
- Born: 10 March 1934 (age 92) Ottapalam, Madras Presidency, British India
- Spouse: Padmini Narayanan
- Children: 2
- Education: Loyola College, Chennai; University of Madras
- Awards: Padma Shri (1992)

Mayankodu Kelath Narayanan (born 10 March 1934) is a retired IPS officer who served as the National Security Adviser of India from 2005 to 2010, assuming the role after the demise of his predecessor Jyotindra Nath Dixit in January 2005. Subsequently, he served as 19th Governor of West Bengal from 2010 to 2014. The Government of India awarded him the civilian honour of Padma Shri in 1992.

== Early life ==
M K Narayanan hails from Kelath family at Ottapalam, Palakkad, a district of the state Kerala.

Narayanan did his schooling from Madras Christian College Higher Secondary School. He completed his graduation from Loyola College, Chennai. He is married to Padmini Narayanan and the couple has a son, Vijay, and a daughter, Meena. Their son-in-law Ajit Nambiar is Chairman and Managing Director of BPL Ltd.

== Career ==
M. K. Narayanan joined the Indian Police Service in 1955 and passed out with the highest marks. After a brief stint as Sub-Divisional Police Officer in the erstwhile State of Madras, he went on deputation to the Intelligence Bureau in February 1959. The rest of his service career was spent under the Government of India, mainly in the Intelligence Bureau, in which he dealt with a whole range of issues concerning internal and national security.

He headed the Intelligence Bureau (IB) from 1987 to 1990, before heading the Joint Intelligence Committee for a year. He became Chief (a four-star rank, equivalent to an Army general) of the IB again in 1991, before retiring in 1992. He was then appointed Special Adviser (a non-Civil Service appointment) for Internal Security to the Prime Minister of India beginning in May 2004.

He was Indian National Security Adviser with the rank of Minister of State from 2005 to 2010. He was the NSA during the 2008 Mumbai terror attacks and had offered to resign owing to the failures which led to the attacks. He was asked by Manmohan Singh, the then Prime Minister to stay on. He played a significant role in the negotiation of the Indo-US Civil Nuclear Agreement. He took over as Governor of West Bengal from Gopalkrishna Gandhi, who had a few disagreements with the then CPI(M)-ruled state on critical issues like violence in Nandigram and Singur.

== See also ==
- Brajesh Mishra
- National Security Council

Political offices
Preceded by Devanand Konwar	Governor of West Bengal; 24 January 2011 – 30 June 2014	Succeeded by D. Y. Patil
Preceded by J. N. Dixit	National Security Advisor; January 2005 – January 2011	Succeeded by Shivshankar Menon
Government offices
Preceded by H. A. Barari	Director of the Intelligence Bureau; April 1987 - December 1989	Succeeded by R. P. Joshi
Preceded by R. P. Joshi	Director of the Intelligence Bureau; January 1991 - February 1992	Succeeded by V. G. Vaidya
