= Operation Black Forest =

Indian government offensive

- Part of the Naxalite–Maoist insurgency
- Locations in India affected by the insurgency (as of 2024)
Date	21 April – 11 May 2025
Location	Adjoining districts between Chhattisgarh and Telangana, India
Result	Operation successful: Karreguttalu Hills secured and cleared of Naxalite-Maoist presence; Nambala Keshava Rao killed

Belligerents
India	Communist Party of India (Maoist)

Commanders and leaders
(India) Amit Shah (India) Gyanendra Pratap Singh (India) Arun Deo Gautam	Nambala Keshava Rao †

Units involved
Central Reserve Police Force; Commando Battalion for Resolute Action; Chhattisgarh Police; Special Task Force; District Reserve Guard	People's Liberation Guerrilla Army

Casualties and losses
18 security personnel wounded	38 militants killed 22 militants arrested 450 IEDs, 2 tonnes of explosives, several rifles and ammunition seized

Operation Black Forest (also Operation Kagaar) was a counter-insurgency and counter-terrorism operation conducted by Indian security forces against Naxalite-Maoist insurgents in areas located between the states of Chhattisgarh and Telangana. The operation began on 21 April 2025.

The Minister of Home Affairs Amit Shah announced on 14 May that the offensive had concluded in a major success for the Indian forces, killing 31 Maoists, including top commanders. Though only 4 deaths could be confirmed. Shah further stated that India will soon be "Naxal-free". The operation resulted in Maoist forces transitioning more to remote and explosive based attacks, while they also lost a significant base of support among the local Adivasi population.

== Background ==
The Naxalite-Maoist insurgency began in India in 1967, when a faction of the Communist Party of India (Marxist) launched a people's war against the Indian government of then Prime Minister Indira Gandhi. The insurgents took inspiration from the Chinese Communist Revolution in their decision. The ensuing confrontation between the recently formed insurgency and the Indian government ended in the fragmentation of the group by the early 1970s into more than 40 small separate groups.

The Naxalites saw their peak of insurgency in the 2000s, when they orchestrated prison attacks, freeing prisoners and killing Indian security forces personnel. The Naxals also tried to assassinate high-profile Indian politicians, such as N. Chandrababu Naidu (then Chief Minister of Andhra Pradesh) in October 2003.

In 2007, the Naxals assassinated Sunil Kumar Mahato (a member of parliament), and continued with an intensified campaign, killing approximately 700 people between 2005 and 2008.

== Operation ==
On 21 April 2025, the Central Reserve Police Force (CRPF), the Special Task Force and the District Reserve Guard (DRG) launched the largest and most significant mission of its kind against Naxals. The Chief of the CRPF Gyanendra Pratap Singh confirmed that security forces completed the operation in the Karreguttalu Hills between the borders of the states of Chhattisgarh and Telangana, facing severe weather conditions and retrieving 28 bodies of the 31 killed Naxalites. Home Affairs Minister Shah also confirmed that there were no security personnel casualties.

However, later sources linked to local police confirmed that 18 security forces were wounded in the operation. The CRPF further commented that the mission had achieved "more than expected" and that the security forces will meet the government's deadline to eliminate the Naxalite insurgency. Military sources claimed that Naxalite headquarters were targeted in the mountains.

The chief of the Chhattisgarh Police also stated that the Maoist leadership had been "dislocated" in the operation and that their military formations had either "got divided or sheltered elsewhere."

Security forces later said that the Karreguttalu Hills were being "sanitised" from Naxals to be soon opened for movement of locals.

== Reactions ==
Prime Minister Narendra Modi commended the operation and said that the killing of 31 Naxalites underscores the commitment of the government and that it is "moving in the right direction to root out left-wing extremism." Home Minister Amit Shah congratulated and hailed the forces involved in the operation, calling on the Naxalites to immediately lay down arms.

Chief Minister of Madhya Pradesh Mohan Yadav also welcomed the military operation calling on the Naxals to "surrender or be eliminated."
