= Rajinder Khanna =

Indian bureaucrat and Additional National Security Advisor of India

RAS Rajinder Khanna IPS (Retired)
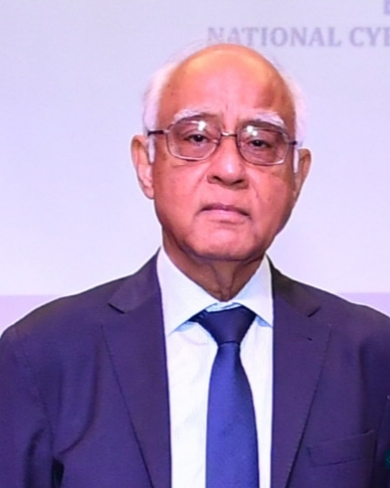
- Khanna in 2023

Additional National Security Advisor of India
- Incumbent
- Assumed office 15 July 2024
- Preceded by: Position Established

Deputy National Security Advisor of India
- In office 2 January 2018 – 14 July 2024
- Preceded by: Arvind Gupta
- Succeeded by: T. V. Ravichandran

Secretary of the Research and Analysis Wing
- In office 31 December 2014 – 31 December 2016
- Preceded by: Alok Joshi
- Succeeded by: Anil Dhasmana

Personal details
- Born: 1956 (age 69–70)
- Education: (BA) Hansraj College (MBA) Faculty of Management Studies – University of Delhi; Delhi University

Rajinder Khanna (born 1956) is a retired Indian Police Service (IPS) officer and a spymaster who is currently serving as the Additional National Security Advisor of India since July 2024. Starting from 2018, he has served as the secretary of the National Security Council Secretariat. He is also a former chief of the Research and Analysis Wing, the external intelligence agency of India.

== Early career ==
Rajinder Khanna is a graduate with BA in economics (Hons.) from Hansraj College of Delhi University, followed by an MBA from the Faculty of Management Studies – University of Delhi in 1978.

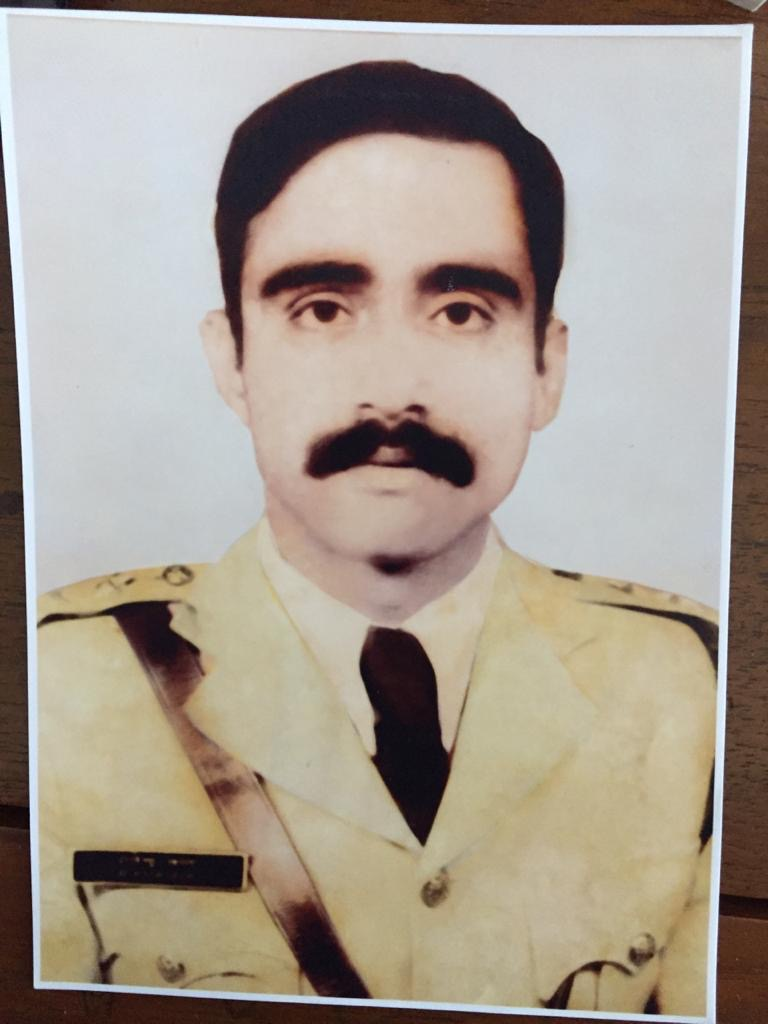
Early career photograph of Rajinder Khanna

== Career ==
During the foundation course for civil services at the Lal Bahadur Shastri National Academy of Administration in Mussoorie, he was awarded the Director's silver medal for securing the highest marks in Economics.

He joined the Indian Police Service (IPS) in 1978 and was allotted to the Odisha cadre. From 1979 to 1985, he held several important posts including Superintendent of Police in Puri and Ganjam districts in Odisha. As the Superintendent of Police in Puri, he received a number of commendations from the Chief Minister for eradicating dacoity in the district.

At a 2017 conference in Myanmar, Khanna shared advice on how terrorism in Rakhine State could be tackled. He talked about how the Pakistani terrorist group Lashkar-e-Taiba, its charitable arm Falah-e-Insaniat Foundation and the Jamaat-ul-Mujahideen Bangladesh were collaborating, disguised as humanitarian aid groups to train and arm the Arakan Rohingya Salvation Army. He said India was monitoring Rohingya militancy since the 2004 arms and ammunition haul in Chittagong, where the weapons seized were mostly meant for the Insurgency in Northeast India, but some were for Rohingya groups too. Khanna also asserted the role of the Pakistani intelligence agency Inter-Services Intelligence in Rohingya militancy, many Rohingya terrorists were born in Pakistan and educated at the country's radical Islamic seminaries.

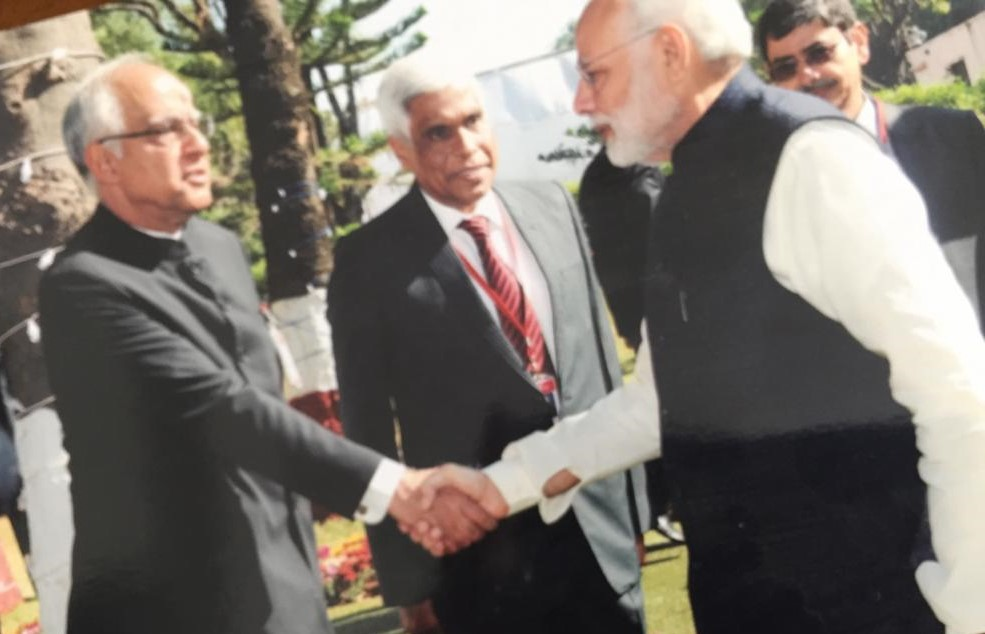
Rajinder Khanna meeting Indian Prime Minister Narendra Modi

Khanna is considered the founder and driving force of the counter-terrorism unit in R&AW, and he is said to be an expert on terrorism. He was appointed one of the three Deputy National Security Advisors of India in 2018, taking over from Arvind Gupta. Khanna was the first R&AW chief who was directly recruited into R&AW cadre from the IPS. Khanna served as the Deputy NSA in charge of Technology and Intelligence (T&I). He was appointed the first ever Additional NSA in Indian history in 2024. He has been a member of the National Security Council (NSC) because of both the positions he holds. As the Deputy NSA, he played a key role in establishing the office of the National Cybersecurity Coordinator at the National Cyber Coordination Centre. The aim of this office was to create a centralized structure to combat cybercrime and cyberattacks.

On 13 February 2018, Khanna was present when the New Mon State Party and Lahu Democratic Union joined the Nationwide Ceasefire Agreement at Myanmar's capital Naypyidaw. On 31 May 2018, Khanna and officials from the Ministry of External Affairs (MEA) held a meeting with Haneef Atmar, the Minister of Foreign Affairs of Afghanistan. The meeting was held to discuss cross-border terrorism originating in Pakistan, as well as "strategic security cooperation and the regional security situation". Khanna attended the inaugural meeting of the Security Council Secretaries of the Shanghai Cooperation Organisation, held in Beijing on 21 and 22 May.

From 8 to 10 March 2022, United Nations officials from the ISIL (Da'esh) and Al-Qaida Sanctions Committee visited India. They met Khanna, ME officials and Foreign Secretary Harsh Vardhan Shringla to discuss the enforcement of sanctions against the Islamic State, Al-Qaeda and Taliban under United Nations Security Council Resolution 1267 and United Nations Security Council Resolution 1988. India was the chair of the United Nations Security Council Counter-Terrorism Committee at the time.

The office of the Additional NSA has always existed in the Indian security apparatus, but was never occupied by any official. In his first term in the NSC, Khanna worked along with the other two Deputy NSAs Vikram Misri and Pankaj Singh, working under NSA Ajit Doval. In his second term in the NSC, Khanna worked under Doval, with the three new Deputy NSAs T. V. Ravichandran, Pavan Kapoor and Anish Dayal Singh. Indian officials said Doval and Khanna were retained to ensure continuity of the national security structure.

Preceded by Alok Joshi	Secretary, R&AW; 31 December 2014 – 31 January 2017	Succeeded by AK Dhasmana
