= Dattatray Padsalgikar =

Indian public servant

Deputy National Security Advisor of India
- In office 29 October 2019 – 31 October 2023 Serving with Pankaj Saran, Rajinder Khanna
- Preceded by: R. N. Ravi
- Succeeded by: Pankaj Kumar Singh

41st Director General of Police of Maharashtra Police
- In office 1 July 2018 – 28 February 2019
- Preceded by: Satish Mathur
- Succeeded by: Subodh Kumar Jaiswal

40th Police Commissioner of Mumbai
- In office 31 January 2016 – 29 June 2018
- Preceded by: Ahmad Javed
- Succeeded by: Subodh Kumar Jaiswal

Personal details
- Born: 26 August 1958 (age 68) Solapur, Bombay State, India
- Education: (B.A. in English literature) (M.A. in French Literature) Fergusson College Pune University
- Occupation: IPS officer Civil Servant Bureaucrat
- Awards: President's Police Medal for Distinguished Service. Police Medal for Meritorious Service. Police (Special Duty) Medal. 50th Anniversary Independence Medal.

Military service
- Years of service: 1982–2019
- Rank: Director General of Police

Dattatray "Datta" Padsalgikar (born 26 August 1958) is a retired Indian Police Service (IPS) officer of the Maharashtra cadre. He served as the Deputy National Security Advisor of India to the Government of India from 2019 to 2023. Previously, he served as the Deputy Director General of Police of Maharashtra and also as the Police Commissioner of Mumbai.

== Early life and education ==
Dattatray Padsalgikar hails from a town on the Solapur-Bijapur border, and has a B.A. degree in English Literature and M.A. degree in French literature from Fergusson College Pune University.

== Career ==
An Indian Police Service (IPS) officer of the 1982 batch, Padsalgikar was on deputation to the central government in the Intelligence Bureau (IB) for a few years until he was named as the new Mumbai police commissioner in 30 January 2016 succeeding Ahmad Javed. He served as CP till 29 June 2018, when he was appointed as Maha DGP. On 29 October 2019, he was appointed as Deputy National Security Advisor of India and served till 31 October 2023.

After serving initial postings as Additional Superintendent of Police in Nagpur, Karad and Nashik he was promoted and went on to serve as Superintendent of Police in Osmanabad and Satara, following which he served his first stint in the IB in the early 90s. Padsalgikar was the first Maharashtrian police chief of Mumbai after almost a decade, after D N Jadhav who held the office between March 2007 and February 2008.

Padsalgikar has worked as Deputy Commissioner of Police (DCP) Detection in the crime branch, DCP in Economic Offences Wing, DCP in South Mumbai (Zone 1), DCP of the Bandra-Jogeshwari stretch and Superintendent of Police in Osmanabad and Satara. In the IB, he has worked in Nagaland, New Delhi. Later during a deputation in the Cabinet Secretariat, he was posted to the Embassy of India in Washington D.C. in the United States. Padsalgikar has said that fighting terror and ISIS will be one of his top priorities.

He is also known to be an excellent badminton player and an athlete.

== Career postings ==
Assistant superintendent of police in Nagpur and Karad (Satara) DCP (Detection)
Mumbai crime branch DCP (Economic Offences Wing)
DCP (Bandra Zone)
Superintendent of police in Osmanabad and Satara (IB)
Nagaland and New Delhi (IB)
Washington DC (Cabinet Secretariat)
Joint and additional director in Mumbai
Mumbai Police Commissioner
