= National Security Advisor (India) =

Executive officer of the Indian National Security Council

National Security Advisor of India
- Rāṣṭrīya Surakṣā Parāmarśadātā
- Emblem of India

- Flag of India

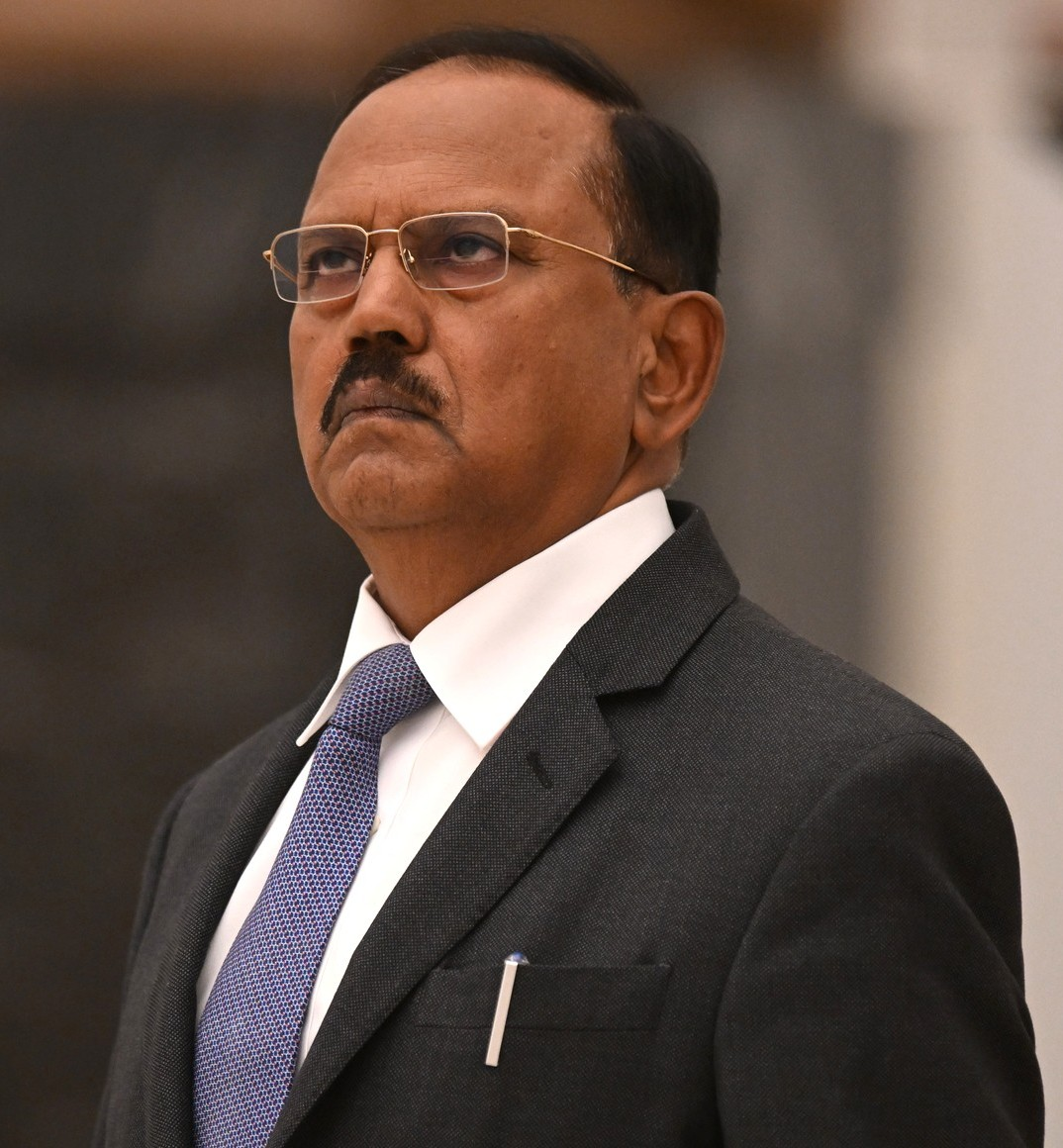
- Incumbent; Ajit Doval, KC since 30 May 2014
- National Security Council Secretariat (NSCS)
- Type: National Security Advisor
- Status: Chief advisor to the Prime Minister of India on national security policy and international affairs
- Abbreviation: NSA
- Member of: Defence Planning Committee (Chairperson); Strategic Policy Group (Chairperson); National Security Council (Secretary)
- Residence: Bungalow 5, Janpath Road, New Delhi
- Seat: Seva Teerth; New Delhi, Delhi, India
- Appointer: Appointments Committee of the Cabinet (ACC)
- Term length: No fixed term
- Inaugural holder: Brajesh Mishra, IFS
- Formation: 19 November 1999; 27 years ago by Atal Bihari Vajpayee
- Deputy: Rajinder Khanna, IPS (Additional NSA); T. V. Ravichandran, IPS; Pavan Kapoor, IFS; Anish Dayal Singh, IPS
- Salary: ₹162,500 (US$1,700) (monthly)

The National Security Advisor (NSA) is the senior official on the National Security Council of the Republic of India, and the chief advisor to the Prime Minister of the Republic of India on National Security policy and International Affairs. Ajit Doval currently serves as the National Security Advisor and ranks seventh in the Indian Order of Precedence.

== History ==
Brajesh Mishra, then Principal Secretary to the Prime Minister, was appointed as the first National Security Advisor of India. The post was created on 19 November 1998 by then government headed by Atal Bihari vajpayee. In 2004, a new government headed by Manmohan Singh was formed at the centre. This government separated the office of NSA into foreign headed by former Foreign Secretary J.N. Dixit and internal headed by former Director, IB M.K. Narayanan. After the death of Dixit in 2005, the office was again fused and Narayanan became the full-time NSA. He was then succeeded by former Foreign Secretary Shivshankar Menon in 2010. In 2014, following the election of Narendra Modi as the Prime Minister, Ajit Doval, former Director of the Intelligence Bureau, was appointed as the NSA.

== Office of the NSA ==
Position	Officer	Service
National Security Advisor (NSA)	Ajit Doval	IPS (Retired)
Additional; National Security Advisor (Addl. NSA)	Rajinder Khanna	IPS (Retired)
Deputy; National Security Advisors (Dy. NSA)	T. V. Ravichandran	IPS (Retired)
Deputy; National Security Advisors (Dy. NSA)	Pavan Kapoor	IFS
Deputy; National Security Advisors (Dy. NSA)	Anish Dayal Singh	IPS (Retired)
National Cybersecurity Coordinator (NCSC)	Navin Kumar	IPS
Military Advisor	Lt. Gen Rajiv Ghai	Indian Army
National Maritime Security Coordinator (NMSC)	Vice Admiral; Biswajit Dasgupta	Indian Navy

== Role ==
The post of the NSA has vested powers, and as such it is a prominent and powerful office in the Government of India. All NSAs appointed since the inception of the post in 1998 belong to the either Indian Foreign Service or to the Indian Police Service, and serve at the discretion of the Prime Minister of India.

The National Security Advisor (NSA) is tasked with regularly advising the Prime Minister of India on all matters relating to internal and external threats and opportunities to India, and oversees strategic and sensitive issues on behalf of the Prime Minister. The NSA of India also serves as the Prime Minister's Special Interlocutor with China as well as the envoy to Pakistan and Israel on security affairs.

The NSA receives all intelligence (R&AW, IB, NTRO, DIA, NIA) reports and co-ordinates them to present before the Prime Minister. NSA is assisted by the Deputy National Security Advisors (Deputy NSAs). Currently, retired IPS officer Dattatray Padsalgikar, former R&AW chief Rajinder Khanna and retired IFS officer Pankaj Saran serve as Deputy National Security Advisors. The Strategic Policy Group (SPG) is the main mechanism for inter-ministerial coordination and integration of inputs in forming national security policies. The group members include the NITI Aayog vice chairman, the cabinet secretary, the three military chiefs, the Reserve Bank of India governor, the Foreign Secretary, Home Secretary, Finance Secretary, and the Defence Secretary.

In June, 2019 NSA Ajit Doval was elevated to the rank of Cabinet Minister with a second 5-year term. On 10 June 2024, he began his third term, again with the rank of Cabinet Minister. The position is "coterminous with the term of the Prime Minister, or until further orders, whichever is earlier".

== List of National Security Advisors ==
No	Name	Portrait	Term of office			Previous Post(s) held	Prime Minister	Additional NSA	Deputy NSA(s)
1	Brajesh Mishra, (Note: Concurrently served as the 9th Principal Secretary to the Prime Minister of India.) IFS		19 November 1998	22 May 2004	5 years, 185 days	Permanent Representative to United Nations; Principal Secretary to the Prime Minister	Atal Bihari Vajpayee		(Post created): Satish Chandra
2	J. N. Dixit, IFS		23 May 2004	3 January 2005	225 days	Foreign Secretary	Manmohan Singh		Vijay K. Nambiar (2004 - 2006)
3	M. K. Narayanan, IPS		3 January 2005	23 January 2010	5 years, 20 days	Director, Intelligence Bureau	Manmohan Singh		Leela K. Ponappa (May 2007 - October 2009); Shekhar Dutt (27 July 2007 - 2009); Alok Prasad (October 2009 - January 2011)
4	Shivshankar Menon, IFS		24 January 2010	26 May 2014	4 years, 143 days	Foreign Secretary	Manmohan Singh		Vijaya Latha Reddy (March 2011 - March 2013); Nehchal Sandhu (21 March 2013 - 31 July 2014)
5	Ajit Doval, IPS		30 May 2014	Incumbent (Period Co-terminus with term of Prime Minister)	12 years, 176 days	Director, Intelligence Bureau	Narendra Modi	Rajinder Khanna (15 July 2024 – Incumbent)	Arvind Gupta (5 August 2014 - 5 August 2017); Pankaj Saran (29 May 2018 - 31 December 2021); R. N. Ravi (5 October 2018 - 31 July 2019); Rajinder Khanna (2 January 2018 – 14 July 2024); Dattatray Padsalgikar (29 October 2019 – 31 October 2023); Vikram Misri (1 Jan 2022–14 July 2024); Pankaj Kumar Singh (18 January 2023 – 31 January 2025 ); T. V. Ravichandran (15 July 2024 – Incumbent); Pavan Kapoor (15 July 2024 – Incumbent); Anish Dayal Singh (25 August 2025 – Incumbent)

== See also ==
- National Security Council
- Secretary of the Research and Analysis Wing
- Director of Intelligence Bureau
