= National Security Council (India) =

Government security agency in India

National Security Council Secretariat
- Rāṣṭrīya Surakṣā Pariṣad
- Emblem of India

- Flag of India

Agency overview
- Formed: 19 November 1998; 28 years ago
- Jurisdiction: Government of India
- Headquarters: New Delhi, Delhi, India
- Employees: Classified
- Annual budget: ₹4,371.31 crore (US$467.0 million) (2026–27)
- Ministers responsible: Narendra Modi, Prime Minister; S. Jaishankar, External Affairs Minister; Amit Shah, Home Affairs Minister; Nirmala Sitharaman, Finance Minister; Rajnath Singh, Defence Minister
- Agency executives: Ajit Doval, National Security Advisor; Ashok Lahiri, Vice Chairman of NITI Aayog; Rajinder Khanna, Additional National Security Advisor.; T V Ravichandran, Deputy National Security Advisor (Technology and intelligence).; Anish Dayal Singh, Deputy National Security Advisor (Internal Affairs).; Pavan Kapoor, Deputy National Security Advisor (Strategic and Foreign Affairs).
- Child agency: National Security Law Division
- Website: Classified

The National Security Council (NSC) (IAST: Rāṣṭrīya Surakṣā Pariṣad) of India is an executive government body tasked with advising the Prime Minister of India on matters of national security and foreign policy and managing the Indian Intelligence Community. It was established by the former prime minister of India Atal Bihari Vajpayee on 19 November 1998, with Brajesh Mishra as the first National Security Advisor.

== History ==
Until 1998, India lacked an integrated intelligence and national security architecture. Intelligence agencies collected and analysed information, while long-term assessments were handled by the Joint Intelligence Committee (JIC). However, this system proved inadequate for managing India’s evolving regional and global security challenges.

In November 1998, the Government established the National Security Council (NSC) and created the post of National Security Advisor (NSA), marking a major shift in security governance. The NSC introduced a multi-layered framework covering strategic, internal, defence, economic, and technological dimensions, supported by domain experts. The JIC was strengthened to coordinate intelligence assessments and interface with the NSC.

Following the Kargil war and the recommendations of the Kargil Review Committee in 2000, India undertook significant reforms to modernize its national security system. These reforms aimed to improve intelligence coordination, internal security, border management, and defence preparedness, leading to a more integrated and cost-effective framework.

The Strategic Policy Group (SPG) was created under the NSC as a key inter-ministerial coordination body responsible for strategic defence reviews and policy recommendations. It was supported by the National Security Council Secretariat (NSCS) and the National Security Advisory Board (NSAB), which brought together experienced officials, military officers, academics, and experts to contribute to national security policy formulation.

== Members ==
Besides the National Security Advisor (NSA), the Chief of Defence Staff (CDS), the Additional National Security Advisor, the Deputy National Security Advisors, the Ministers of Defence, External Affairs, Home, Finance of the Government of India, and the vice chairman of the NITI Aayog are members of the National Security Council.

Under the revamp of National Security Council Secretariat on 1 July 2024 the post of Additional National Security Advisor was filled up in the National Security Council Secretariat which was vacant till now, this move now frees up the NSA from the task of internal security management and threat analysis which will from now be looked upon by the Additional NSA sparing the NSA to directly assist the Prime Minister's Office in the other ongoing security challenges.

== Organisational Structure ==
The NSC is the apex body of the three-tiered structure of the national security management system in India which exercises its power through National Security Council Secretariat having four verticals namely Strategic Planning, Internal Affairs, Intelligence and Technology and a Military vertical. The three tiers of the National Security Council are the Strategic Policy Group, the National Security Advisory Board and a secretariat from the Joint Intelligence Committee.

=== Strategic Policy Group ===
Strategic Policy Group (SPG)
Chairman
National Security Advisor; Ajit Doval
Vice Chairman
Vice Chairman, NITI Aayog; Ashok Lahiri
Administration	Military	Security Advisors	Intelligence	Economic / Financial	Science & Technology
Cabinet Secretary; T. V. Somanathan (IAS) Foreign Secretary; Vikram Misri (IFS) Defence Secretary; Rajesh Kumar Singh (IAS) Home Secretary; Govind Mohan (IAS)	Chief of Defence Staff; General N. S. Raja Subramani Chief of the Army Staff; General Dhiraj Seth Chief of the Naval Staff; Admiral Krishna Swaminathan Chief of the Air Staff; Air Chief Marshal Amar Preet Singh	Additional NSA; Rajinder Khanna (RAS) Deputy NSA; T. V. Ravichandran (IPS) Deputy NSA; Pavan Kapoor (IFS) Deputy NSA; Anish Dayal Singh (IPS) Military Advisor; Lieutenant General Rajiv Ghai	Secretary (Research), R&AW; Parag Jain (IPS) Director, IB; Mahesh Dixit (IPS) Director General, DIA; Lieutenant General Shrinjay Pratap Singh	Governor, RBI; Sanjay Malhotra (IAS) Finance Secretary; Vacant Secretary (Revenue); Arvind Shrivastava (IAS)	Scientific Advisor to the Defence Minister; G. Satheesh Reddy (DRDS) Chairman, DRDO; Rajesh Kumar Singh (IAS) Secretary (Atomic Energy); Ajit Kumar Mohanty (BARC) Secretary (Space); V. Narayanan (ISRO) Secretary, Defence Production; Sanjeev Kumar (IAS)

The Strategic Policy Group undertakes the Strategic Defence Review, a blueprint of short and long term security threats, as well as possible policy options on a priority basis.

=== National Security Advisory Board ===
The brainchild of the first National Security Advisor (NSA), Brajesh Mishra, a former member of Indian Foreign Service. The National Security Advisory Board (NSAB) consists of a group of eminent national security experts outside of the government. Members are usually senior retired officials, civilian as well as military, academicians and distinguished members of civil society drawn from and having expertise in Internal and External Security, Foreign Affairs, Defence, Science & Technology and Economic Affairs.

The first NSAB, constituted in December 1998, headed by the late K. Subrahmanyam produced a draft Nuclear Doctrine for the country in 2001, a Strategic Defence Review in 2002 and a National Security Review in 2007.

The board meets at least once a month, and more frequently as required. It provides a long-term prognosis and analysis to the NSC and recommends solutions and address policy issues referred to it. Initially the board was constituted for one year, but since 2004–06, the board has been reconstituted for two years.

The tenure of the previous NSAB, headed by former Foreign Secretary Shyam Saran, ended in January 2015. It had 14 members.The new board was re-constituted in July 2018, with P. S. Raghavan, former Indian Ambassador to Russia (2014–16), as its head. It had a tenure of two years.

The board is again reconstituted in April 2025 with Alok Joshi as Chairman, NSAB. It currently has 7 members and advices NSC on various security policy formulation and goals, and reports to the NSA on the ongoing development. The NSAB has currently two subordinate bodies working under it : (i) National Information Board (NIB) and (ii) Technology Coordination Group (TCG).

Currently the board has the following members:

Name	Experience
Alok Joshi, RAS	Chairman of the NSAB; Former Secretary of the Research and Analysis Wing
Lieutenant General Ajai Kumar Singh	Former GOC-in-C, Southern Command
Air Marshal Pankaj Mohan Sinha	Former AOC-in-C, Western Air Command
Rear Admiral Monty Khanna	Former Commandant, Naval War College, Goa
Rajiv Ranjan Singh, IPS	Former Special Director, Intelligence Bureau
Manmohan Singh, IPS	Former Special Director, Intelligence Bureau
D. Bala Venkatesh Varma, IFS	Former Ambassador of India to Russia
Prof. Kamakoti Veezhinathan	Director, IIT Madras

=== Joint Intelligence Committee ===
The Joint Intelligence Committee (JIC) of the Government of India analyses intelligence data from the Intelligence Bureau, Research and Analysis Wing and the Directorates of Military, Naval and Air Intelligence and thus analyses both domestic and foreign intelligence. The JIC has its own Secretariat that works under the Cabinet Secretariat.

=== Cyber Security ===
National Cyber Security Strategy is formulated by the Office of National Cyber Security Coordinator at the National Security Council Secretariat. The National Security Council Secretariat and National Information Board headed by National Security Adviser to whom National Cyber Coordination Centre reports are at working under the cyber security surveillance helping in framing India's cyber security policy. It aims to protect the cyber space including critical information infrastructure from attack, damage, misuse and economic espionage.

In 2014 the National Critical Information Infrastructure Protection Centre under the National Technical Research Organisation mandated the protection of critical information infrastructure. In 2015, the Office of National Cyber Security Coordinator was created to advice the Prime Minister on strategic cyber security issues. In the case of nodal entity, India's Computer Emergency Response Team (CERT-in) is playing a crucial role under the Ministry of Electronics and Information Technology(MEITY).

On 15 June 2021, the Government of India launched the Trusted Telecom Portal signalling the coming into effect of the National Security Directive on Telecommunication Sector (NSDTS). Consequently, with effect from 15 June 2021 the Telecom Service Providers (TSPs) are mandatorily required to connect in their networks only those new devices which are designated as Trusted Products from Trusted Sources.

== See also ==
- Cabinet Committee on Security
- Indian Intelligence Community
