= Prakash Singh =

Former Chief of BSF and Indian Police Service officer

Chairman Indian Police Foundation and Institute
- In office 1 October 2015 – 31 October 2020
- Preceded by: Position Established
- Succeeded by: Ranjit Shekhar Mooshahary

Director General of Police Border Security Force
- In office June 1993 – January 1994

Director General of Police Uttar Pradesh Police
- In office 1991–1993

Director General of Police Assam Police
- In office 1991–1991

Personal details
- Born: 10 January 1936 (age 90) Azamgarh, Uttar Pradesh, India
- Children: Pankaj Kumar Singh, IPS
- Education: B.A., M.A. (History)
- Alma mater: University of Allahabad
- Occupation: Bureaucrat & Indian Police Reform movement
- Known for: Bureaucratic accountability and Indian Police Reforms
- Awards: Padma Shri (1991); Presidents Police Medal

Prakash Singh is a retired Indian Police Service officer, who rose to the highest rank of Director General of Police (DGP). He has served as Chief of the Border Security Force (BSF), Uttar Pradesh Police and Assam Police. He is considered one of the best police officers for his role as key architect for Police reforms in India. After his retirement from service in 1996, he filed a Public Interest Litigation (PIL) in the Supreme Court of India. The landmark verdict of PIL came in 2006, in which the Supreme Court has given specific directions to the central and state governments to carry out structural changes in the police with a view to insulating it from extraneous pressures and making it accountable to the people.

== Personal life ==
Singh was born on 10 January 1936 in a Bais Rajput Family in a small village near Mehnajpur Azamgarh district of Uttar Pradesh, India and studied in the University of Allahabad. He is married to Savitri. His son Pankaj Kumar Singh was appointed as the Director General of Border Security Force in September 2021. His another son Piyush Kumar Singh was a Fortune 500 corporate executive, a successful start-up Founder and currently a CoFounder of an Insurance Services Product company in the US. Presently Prakash Singh and his wife live in Noida.

== Career ==
Prakash Singh is a 1959 batch, Uttar Pradesh cadre Indian Police Service Officer. His first posting as an IPS Officer was as Assistant Superintendent of Police, Kanpur (ASP Kanpur).

== Post retirement activities ==
- Present Chairman of Indian Police Foundation and Institute.
- Associate Fellow, Joint Special Operations University.
- Conducted Inquiry into Haryana Jat Reservation Agitation in 2016.
- Member, National Security Advisory Board between 2013 and 2014.
- Member, Expert Group of Planning Commission to study Challenges in Extremist Affected Areas in 2008.
- Chairman of Committee constituted by Allahabad High Court to De-Criminalize politics in UP between 2007 and 2008.
- Supreme Court of India gave orders on his petition to Restructure the Police Forces for Police Reforms in 2006.
- Headed Inquiry Commission to probe attempted assassination of N. Chandrababu Naidu by Naxalites in 2004.
- Assists the Union Public Service Commission as expert in the selection of All India Civil Services officers.

== Prakash Singh committees ==
After retirement he has been tasked to head Inquiry Committees on two occasions.

- In February 2016 he was appointed by Government of Haryana to submit the report on Role of Officers of Civil Administration and Police during Jat reservation agitation in Haryana. The agitation had resulted in loss of 30 lives, blockade of National Highways, large scale damage to public and private property in many districts worth INR 20,000 crores. The 451 pages report, indicting 80 government officials was submitted in record period of 71 days.
- In 2003, the Government of Andhra Pradesh had asked him to conduct an Inquiry into the incident of mine blast at Tirumala Ghat Road, Chittur District on 1 October 2003 in which the Naxalite attempted to assassinate the then Chief Minister of the state, Mr N. Chandrababu Naidu. A comprehensive Report was submitted by him on 6 February 2004.

== As an author ==
Singh has authored the following books.

- Irregular Warfare: The Maoist Challenge to India's Internal Security. Joint Special Operations University. 2014. ISBN 978-1099552373.
- India's Northeast: The Frontier in Ferment. Joint Special Operations University. 2008. ISBN 9781079009798.
- Histoire du Naxalisme (French). Les Nuits Rouges. 2003. ISBN 9782913112216.
- Kohima to Kashmir: On the Terrorist Trail. Rupa & Co. 2001. ISBN 9788171675210.
- Prakash Singh; US Department of the Army; Foreign Military Studies Office (2000). Disaster Response in India. Books Express publishing. ISBN 9781780391427.
- The Naxalite Movement in India. Rupa & Co. 1995. ISBN 9788129134943.
- Nagaland. National Book Trust. 1972. ISBN 9788123714844.
- Singh, Prakash (5 May 2022). The Struggle for Police Reforms in India. Rupa Publications. ISBN 9789355202475.

== Awards ==
Prakash Singh is a recipient of Padma Shri Award in year 1991 for his contribution to Civil Service. He has also been awarded State award by Government of Uttar Pradesh, Police Medal for Meritorious Service and Police Medal for Distinguished Service.
