= Pankaj Kumar Singh =

Former Deputy National Security Advisor

Pankaj Kumar Singh IPS (Retd.)
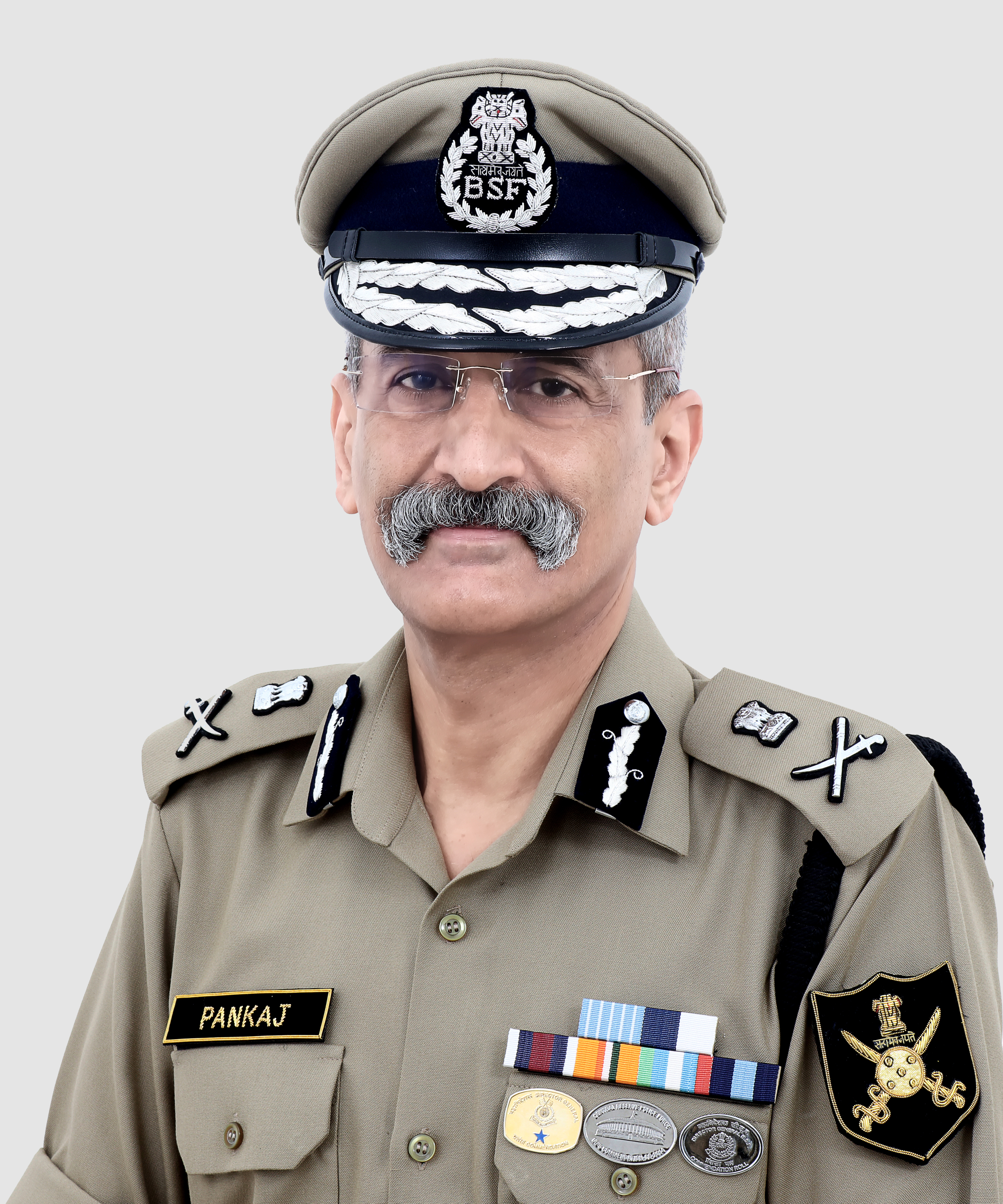

Interlocutor and Government of India representative on issues related to Darjeeling, Dooars and Terai
- Incumbent
- Assumed office Present
- Preceded by: Position Established

Deputy National Security Advisor of India
- In office 18 January 2023 – 31 January 2025
- Preceded by: Dattatray Padsalgikar
- Succeeded by: Anish Dayal Singh

Director General of BSF
- In office 31 August 2021 – 31 December 2022
- Preceded by: Surjeet Singh Deswal
- Succeeded by: Sujoy Lal Thaosen

ADG Traffic, Rajasthan
- In office 24 December 2018 – February 2020

ADG Crime, Rajasthan
- In office 2014–2018

Personal details
- Born: 19 December 1962 (age 63) Uttar Pradesh
- Spouse: Nupur Singh
- Parents: Prakash Singh (father); Savitri Singh (mother)
- Education: (BSc)Hindu College; Delhi University (M.Phil)Madras University (LL.B)Delhi University (MBA)IIM Ahmedabad
- Occupation: IPS officer
- Profession: Civil Service
- Awards: President's Police Medal for Distinguished Service; Police Medal for Meritorious Service

Military service
- Years of service: 1988–2022
- Rank: Director General of Police

Pankaj Kumar Singh PSM MSM IPS (born 19 December 1962) is currently serving as the Interlocutor and Government of India representative on issues related to Darjeeling, Dooars and Terai. He is a retired Indian Police Service officer of 1988 batch and served as the 29th Director General (DG) of the Border Security Force. In January 2023, he was appointed as the Deputy National Security Advisor of India for a two-year term.

== Education ==
Pankaj Kumar Singh holds degrees of BSc (Hons.) Physics from Hindu College, Delhi affiliated with Delhi University, M.Phil. from Chennai University, LL.B from Delhi University, and PG Diploma in Business Administration from IIM Ahmedabad.

== Personal life ==
He is the son of former Director General (DG) of the Border Security Force, Prakash Singh, who served as the DG of BSF from 1993 to 1994.

== Awards ==
He has been decorated with several DG's Discs and commendations. He also got awarded with UN Peace Medal (Bar), Police Medal for Meritorious Service and President Police Medal for Distinguished Service.

Police Medal	President's Police Medal
