= Brajesh Mishra =

Indian Diplomat and First National Security Advisor of India

His Excellency Brajesh Mishra, IFS (Retd.)
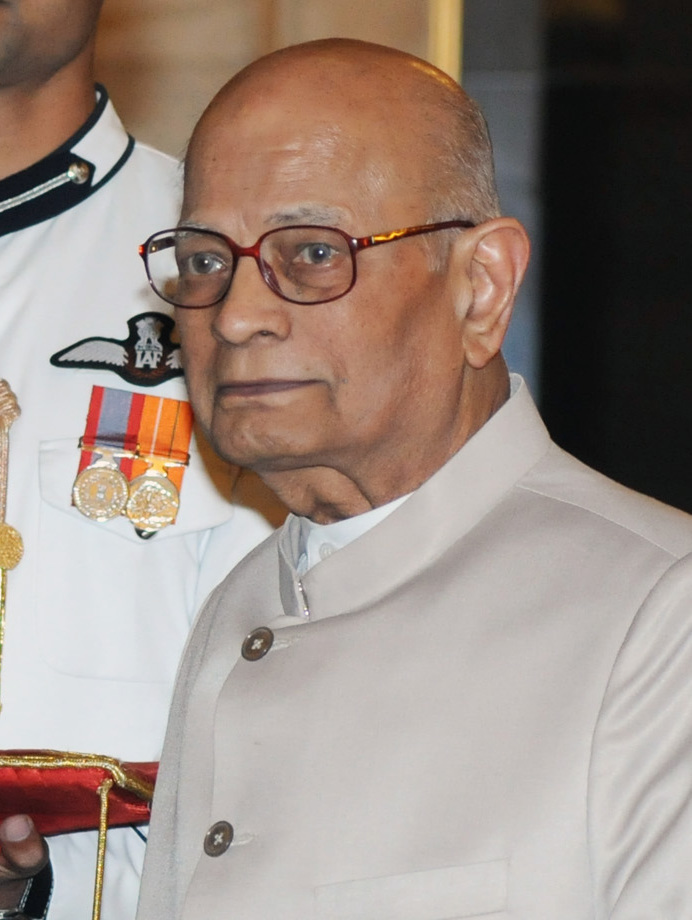
- Mishra in 2011.

1st National Security Advisor of India
- In office 19 November 1998 – 22 May 2004
- Prime Minister: Atal Bihari Vajpayee
- Preceded by: Office established
- Succeeded by: J. N. Dixit

11th Principal Secretary to the Prime Minister of India
- In office 19 March 1998 – 22 May 2004
- Prime Minister: Atal Bihari Vajpayee
- Preceded by: N. N. Vohra
- Succeeded by: T. K. A. Nair

Permanent Representative of India to the United Nations
- In office June 1979 – April 1981
- Preceded by: Rikhi Jaipal
- Succeeded by: Natarajan Krishnan

Personal details
- Born: Brajesh Chandra Mishra; 29 September 1928
- Died: 28 September 2012 (aged 84) New Delhi, India
- Cause of death: Heart failure
- Party: Bharatiya Janata Party (1991–98)
- Parent: Dwarka Prasad Mishra (father)
- Relatives: Sudhir Mishra (nephew)
- Occupation: Civil Servant (IFS); Politician
- Known for: India's first National Security Advisor and prime minister, Atal Bihari Vajpayee's principal secretary
- Awards: Padma Vibhushan

Brajesh Chandra Mishra (29 September 1928 – 28 September 2012) was an Indian politician and diplomat from the Indian Foreign Service who is best known for serving as the first National Security Advisor of India from 1998 to 2004. He also served as the principal secretary of then Prime Minister Atal Bihari Vajpayee. He received the Padma Vibhushan for his contributions.

== Early life and family ==
He was born in Hindu Brahmin family on 29 September 1928 to Dwarka Prasad Mishra, who was a former Chief Minister of Madhya Pradesh. His father was considered a staunch politician from the Congress Party and very close to Indira Gandhi though they fell out later.

== Diplomatic career ==
Brajesh Mishra joined the Indian Foreign Service (IFS) in 1951. He served as chargé d'affaires in Beijing after the 1962 Sino-Indian War and was India's ambassador to Indonesia. He was also ambassador and India's Permanent Representative in Geneva. Mishra's last posting was as India's permanent representative to the United Nations from June 1979 to April 1981.

As permanent representative, he voiced India's position on the Soviet invasion of Afghanistan at the sixth emergency special session of the United Nations General Assembly, but his disagreement with that position was part of the reason why he resigned from IFS and joined the United Nations in 1981; serving as 6th United Nations Commissioner for Namibia from 1 April 1982 to 1 July 1987.

== Principal secretary and National Security Advisor ==
In April 1991, Mishra joined the Bharatiya Janata Party and became head of its foreign policy cell. He resigned from the party in March 1998 on becoming the 9th Principal Secretary to the Prime Minister of India. After Brajesh Mishra, the post of principal secretary became such a powerful one that it eclipsed the status of cabinet ministers. As Vajpayee's troubleshooter, he was one of the most powerful principal secretaries the Prime Minister's Office had ever seen.

From November 1998 to 23 May 2004, he was also the first National Security Advisor and was instrumental in creating an institutional structure for national security management. His batch as an IFS officer was the same as the Indian Administrative Service batch of K. Subrahmanyam, widely considered as the doyen of India's strategic affairs community, and made him the first convener of the National Security Advisory Board where they worked closely on many issues.

He was the key motivator of foreign policy and principal spokesman on major issues. He was actively involved in framing India's geo-political policies. He was closely involved in planning the 1998 Nuclear tests and played a crucial role in shaping India's policy regarding Pakistan and China.

He is stated to have played a major role in pushing and supporting the Bhutan to undertake Operation All Clear.

== Final years and death ==
After demitting office, Mishra had initially expressed reservations against the India–United States Civil Nuclear Agreement. Following this, the then Prime Minister, Manmohan Singh briefed specially to address his concerns about the deal. Thereafter, Mishra extended his support and publicly endorsed the deal.

In 2011, he was awarded the Padma Vibhushan, India's second highest civilian award.

Mishra died on 28 September 2012 at Fortis hospital, Vasant Kunj in New Delhi.

Preceded by Office established	National Security Advisor; 1998–2004	Succeeded by Jyotindra Nath Dixit
