= Gyanendra Pratap Singh =

Director General of the Central Reserve Police Force

Director General of Central Reserve Police Force
- Incumbent
- Assumed office 30 January 2025
- Preceded by: Anish Dayal Singh

Director General of Police of Assam
- In office 31 January 2023 – 29 January 2025
- Preceded by: Bhaskar Jyoti Mahanta
- Succeeded by: Harmeet Singh

Personal details
- Born: 8 November 1967 (age 59) Aligarh, Uttar Pradesh, India
- Occupation: IPS officer
- Profession: Civil servant

Gyanendra Pratap Singh also known as GP Singh (born 8 November 1967) is a 1991- batch Indian Police Service (IPS) officer from Assam-Meghalaya cadre who served as the Director General of Assam Police from 2023-2025. On 30 January 2025 he took charge as the Director General of the Central Reserve Police Force of India.

== Personal life ==
Singh was born in a respected Rajput family on 8 November 1967 in Chharra, Aligarh district of Uttar Pradesh, India. His daughter is a Delhi-cadre IPS officer who is currently posted as ACP of Lajpat Nagar in Delhi. His other daughter, Aradhita Singh is a Rajya Sabha Secretariat.

== Career ==
Singh previously served as the Director General of Police in Assam. During his tenure, he was recognized for his efforts in counter-terrorism and maintaining state law and order. He has also worked with the National Investigation Agency (NIA) as an Inspector General, where he handled major counter-terrorism investigations, including cases involving ULFA-I in Assam and coordinated operations across Northeast India and Kashmir, and has experience with the Special Protection Group (SPG), providing security to former Prime Ministers.

=== Rhino conservation and anti-poaching efforts ===
In June 2021, the Assam government appointed Singh to lead the newly formed Anti-Rhino Poaching Task Force to strengthen wildlife protection in Kaziranga and other national parks. Under his leadership, the Assam Police and the Forest Department integrated the use of drones, surveillance cameras, armed patrol teams, sniffer dogs, and intelligence networks to counter poaching groups. Following these initiatives, rhino poaching incidents in the state declined sharply. In 2022, Assam recorded zero incidents of rhino poaching, marking the first time the state achieved this since 1977. Singh later cited the inter-departmental coordination during the anti-poaching campaign as a significant milestone of his tenure in Assam, which coincided with an increase in the state's rhino population during subsequent wildlife censuses.

=== Campaign against child marriage ===
In late 2022, under Singh's leadership, the Assam Police conducted preliminary assessments to identify villages with high incidences of child marriage. Following approval from the state government, a statewide enforcement campaign was launched in 2023. The operation resulted in the registration of thousands of cases and multiple arrests under child protection and marriage laws. Alongside law enforcement measures, the Assam Police participated in community and school outreach programs to raise awareness about the legal age of marriage and girls' education. The campaign was noted as one of the largest law enforcement operations of its kind in the state, drawing widespread public and political attention. The action against child marriage has led to significant improvements in the infant mortality rate and maternal mortality rates in Assam. The SDG ranking of Assam has also improved substantially due to the improved infant and maternal health indices in the state. The improved SDG rankings has improved the institutional investment environment of the state.

Role played during anti-CAA protest

GP Singh was deputed by Ministry of Home Affairs to Assam cutting short his deputation tenure with National Investigation Agency at New Delhi. He was air-dashed by special flight middle of the night on Dec 11th/12th to take over the reins of the Law & Order wing of Assam Police with a mandate to restore normalcy. This happened in December 2019 after large scale Violence had broken out in Assam during protests against the Citizen Amendment Bill (CAB) which was later passed by the Indian Parliament to become Citizenship Amendment Act. G.P. Singh had taken a proactive, stern stance against violence during the anti-Citizenship Amendment Act (CAA) agitations. He strictly warned protesters against vandalism and stated that financial losses from enforced shutdowns (bandhs) would be recovered from the organizers. At the same time, he actively urged the public to resolve their grievances through peaceful, constitutional avenues rather than taking to the streets. He emphasized that "the quantum of force used by security forces is inversely proportional to the quantum of force deployed," arguing that a heavy, visible police presence was meant to deter violence before it could begin.

Role to tackle Left Wing Extremism

GP Singh led counter-LWE missions in swift coordination with state police, intelligence agencies and MHA that hit the operational capability of CPI (Maoist). He oversaw the evolving role of CRPF beyond conventional offensive operations to include area domination, route security, infrastructure protection and development projects, establishment of Forward Operating Bases (FOBs) and support to State Police Forces and civil administration. During these operations, security forces reported 641 Maoists were neutralised, 3,995 apprehended and 3,420 surrendered, which resulted in recovery of 1,928 weapons, 69,228 rounds of ammunition, 9,689 IEDs, bombs and grenades and 84,596 detonators.

GP Singh's tenure coincided with operational priorities aligned with broader national strategy to permanently reduce Left Wing extremism. Singh's tenure was marked by continued strengthening of intelligence-based planning and organisational preparedness for sustained deployments in Maoist-affected areas. The assessment of his tenure is focused on broader organisational changes and operational priorities that helped the force maintain pressure on Maoist networks over extended periods.
