= Ajit Doval =

5th National Security Advisor of India (born 1945)

Ajit Kumar Doval KC
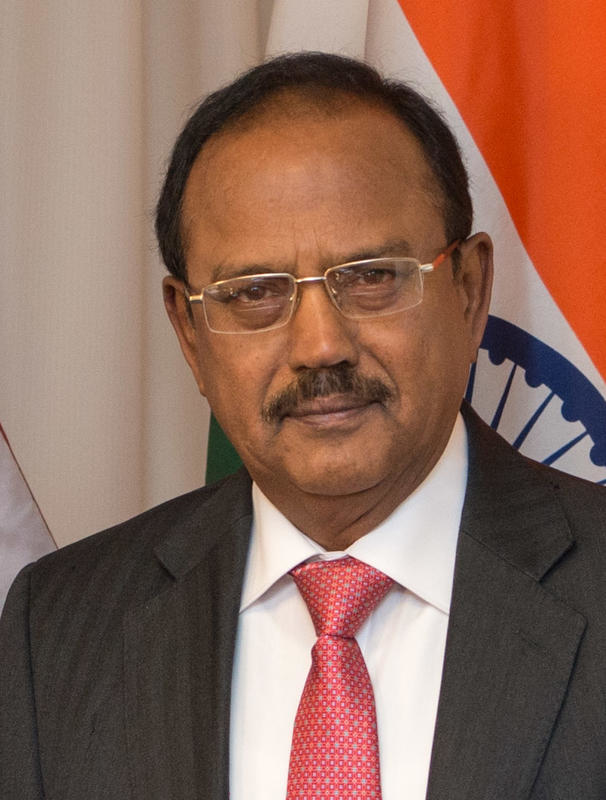
- Doval in 2026

5th National Security Advisor of India
- Incumbent
- Assumed office 30 May 2014
- Prime Minister: Narendra Modi
- Preceded by: Shivshankar Menon

Director of the Intelligence Bureau
- In office 31 July 2004 – 31 January 2005
- Prime Minister: Manmohan Singh
- Preceded by: K. P. Singh
- Succeeded by: E. S. L. Narasimhan

Personal details
- Born: 20 January 1945 (age 81) Ghiri Banelsyun, United Provinces, British India (present-day Uttarakhand, India)
- Spouse: Aruni Doval (m. 1972)
- Children: 2
- Education: Dr. Bhimrao Ambedkar University (MA); National Defence College (M.Phil.)
- Occupation: Spymaster
- Profession: Bureaucrat
- Awards: Kirti Chakra; President's Police Medal for Distinguished Service; Police Medal for Meritorious Service

Ajit Kumar Doval (born 20 January 1945) is an Indian bureaucrat, spymaster and retired police and intelligence officer who has been serving as the longest tenured National Security Advisor of India (NSA) since 2014. Doval is serving his third consecutive five-year term as NSA. During his second tenure, he was given Cabinet rank. Doval previously held the position of Director of the Intelligence Bureau from 2004 to 2005, after leading its operations wing for over a decade. He worked as a career intelligence officer for over 33 years. He is recognized for his contributions to counter-terrorism and covert missions.

Born in Pauri Garhwal in present-day Uttarakhand, Doval completed his education from Ajmer Military School, Agra University, and the National Defence College. After clearing his Union Public Service Commission (UPSC) examination in 1968, he joined the Indian Police Service as a Kerala cadre officer. In 1972, he joined the Intelligence Bureau. His field assignments have spanned Mizoram, Sikkim, Punjab, and Jammu and Kashmir. He has held diplomatic assignments at the Indian High Commission in Islamabad and London. He received the Kirti Chakra gallantry award in 1989, becoming the first police officer to receive the second-highest peacetime military honour. Doval was also involved in multiple negotiations of hijacked Indian Airlines aircraft. At headquarters he was founder chairman of the Multi Agency Centre and the Joint Task Force on Intelligence.

He retired as chief of the Intelligence Bureau in January 2005. In retirement he gave lectures, interviews and wrote op-eds. Around 2008, he helped set up the Rashtriya Raksha University. In 2009, he became founder director of the Vivekananda International Foundation, a public policy think tank based in New Delhi, and served as its director until his appointment as NSA. Major military operations during Doval's tenure include Operation Hot Pursuit, the Balakot airstrike and Operation Sindoor. The Doklam standoff was eventually resolved through diplomatic channels and negotiations.

== Early life, education and personal life ==
Doval was born in 1945 in Ghiri Banelsyun village in Pauri Garhwal in United Provinces (now in Uttarakhand) in the erstwhile British Raj (currently India). He is the son of GN Doval and Indra Doval. Doval's father, Major Gunanand Doval, was an officer in the Indian Army. He served in the Bengal Sappers for 36 years.

Doval received his early education at the Ajmer Military School in Ajmer, Rajasthan. He graduated with a bachelor's and master's degree in economics from Agra University in 1967. During his master's he secured first position. The following year Doval cleared the Union Public Service Commission (UPSC) examination. He went on to graduate from the 30th course of the National Defence College, New Delhi, in 1990.

He married Aruni Doval in 1972 and has two children Shaurya and Vivek Doval.

During a lecture in 2015, Doval said that he comes from a vegetarian family however his work led him to eat non-vegetarian food as well. During a dialogue in January 2026, Doval was asked a question about how he uses communication tools, he elaborated that he largely does not use the internet for work, and the phone only for family and when speaking to people abroad. He stated that there were also other methods of communication not used by the general public.

He does not have a social media account. He is fluent in Urdu.

== Police and intelligence career (1968–2005) ==
Doval joined the Indian Police Service (IPS) in 1968 in the Kerala cadre as the Assistant Superintendent of Police (ASP) of Kottayam district in Kerala. In 1972, he was transferred to riot hit Thalassery, Kerala. He was there for a few months between January and June 1972. In the same year he went on to join the central service, the Intelligence Bureau (IB). His government job in the IB largely saw him as a "typical undercover agent".

One of Doval's first assignments in the IB was to tackle the insurgency in northeast India, specifically in Mizoram. Between 1972 and 1977, he officially led the IBs Subsidiary Intelligence Bureau in Aizawl. Doval spent these five years mostly undercover. During this period, he was awarded the Police Medal for meritorious service in 1974. Doval had a role in laying the groundwork for negotiation, the 1976 agreement, and eventually the Mizoram Peace Accord of 1986. He was the man behind turning six of seven of Laldenga's commanders.

He had a role in Sikkim's merger with India in 1975 encompassing political engineering, liaisoning and facilitation. He was head of the IBs Subsidiary Intelligence Bureau in Sikkim.

Doval was in Pakistan for seven years. He worked at the Indian High Commission in Islamabad from 1983 to 1987. Officially, he was head of the commercial section. His undercover roles in Pakistan would allow him to visit mosques for prayers and make friends through which he could gather relevant information. To fit the role, he had to get plastic surgery done on his pierced ears. Working undercover in Pakistan as a beggar, he collected hair from scientists from a barber shop; this hair tested positive for signs of uranium, helping to expose Pakistan's nuclear programme. He also kept a watch over Sikh pilgrims and the separatist propaganda they faced.

In 1988, during Operation Black Thunder he infiltrated the Golden Temple posing as a Pakistani agent disguised as a rickshaw puller, spied on Khalistani separatists, and gathered information. He would go on to receive the Kirti Chakra for his role in the operation. At the time, Doval was a joint director in the IB. Insurgency in Punjab would keep him occupied for nearly a decade. In 1991, he headed the operation as a joint director to rescue a captured Romanian diplomat from four Sikh militant groups including Bhindranwale Tiger Force.

In the 1990s, he turned militant Kuka Parray. He also helped bring other Kashmiri separatists to the negotiating table.

Between 1992 and 1996, he was posted at India House, London.

He has the experience of being involved in the termination of all 15 hijackings of Indian Airlines aircraft from 1971 to 1999, a notable instance was the 1999 hijacked aeroplane IC-814. Doval would go on to say the negotiation was a diplomatic failure. This was the first time Doval would come under the gaze of the media.

He was trained under M. K. Narayanan, the third National Security Advisor of India for a brief period in counterterrorism operations.

In the headquarters, he headed IB's operations wing for over a decade and was founder Chairman of the Multi Agency Centre (MAC), as well as of the Joint Task Force on Intelligence (JTFI). He was appointed Director of IB in July 2004 and held the post until his retirement in January 2005. Doval's career as an intelligence officer spanned over 33 years. In 2004, Doval was made president of the International Association of Chiefs of Police for Asia and Pacific region.

== Post-retirement (2005–2014) ==
Doval retired in January 2005 as Director, Intelligence Bureau. He continued working unofficially.

In July 2005, Doval was briefly detained by Mumbai Police alongside Vicky Malhotra and Farid Tanasha, two members of Chhota Rajan's gang. Doval had been working on a secret plan to kill Dawood Ibrahim in Dubai where he was attending his daughter's wedding. Mumbai Police were unaware of Doval's involvement of the plot as they had gone in to arrest the two gangsters.

Doval remained actively involved in the discourse on national security in India. Besides writing editorial pieces for several leading newspapers and journals, he delivered lectures on India's security challenges and foreign policy objectives at several renowned government and non-governmental institutions, security think-tanks in India and abroad.

Around 2008, Narendra Modi, then Chief Minister of Gujarat, brought in Doval to set up a university, the Rashtriya Raksha University.

In January 2009, he was chosen by the Government of Karnataka as its security advisor.

In December 2009, he became the founding Director of the Vivekananda International Foundation (VIF), a public policy think tank set up by the Vivekananda Kendra.

In 2009 and 2012, he co-wrote two reports on "Indian Black Money Abroad in Secret Banks and Tax Havens" as a part of a task force constituted by Bharatiya Janata Party.

In 2012, IB kept eyes on him due to then ruling party Congress's suspicions that Doval and VIF were the brains behind Ramdev and Anna Hazare led anti-corruption movement, which generated anger against the government.

As director VIF, he has delivered guest lectures at National Defence College, Centre for Land Warfare Studies, Institute for Defence Studies and Analysis, Bureau of Police Research and Development, Lal Bahadur Shastri National Academy of Administration, Federation of Indian Chambers of Commerce & Industry, Rambhau Mhalgi Prabodhini, IIT Delhi, Jamia Milia Islamia University, Osmania University, Maharaja Agrasen College, Kanpur University, and Shri Ram College of Commerce among others. Lectures at foreign locations include International Institute for Strategic Studies, International Security Forum, American Foreign Policy Council, Capitol Hill, Keizai Koho Centre, and Project Interchange. Doval has written on Pakistan, Afghanistan, and China, however comparatively very little on other countries.

On being named the NSA, he stepped down from his post as director of VIF in 2014.

== National Security Advisor (2014–present) ==
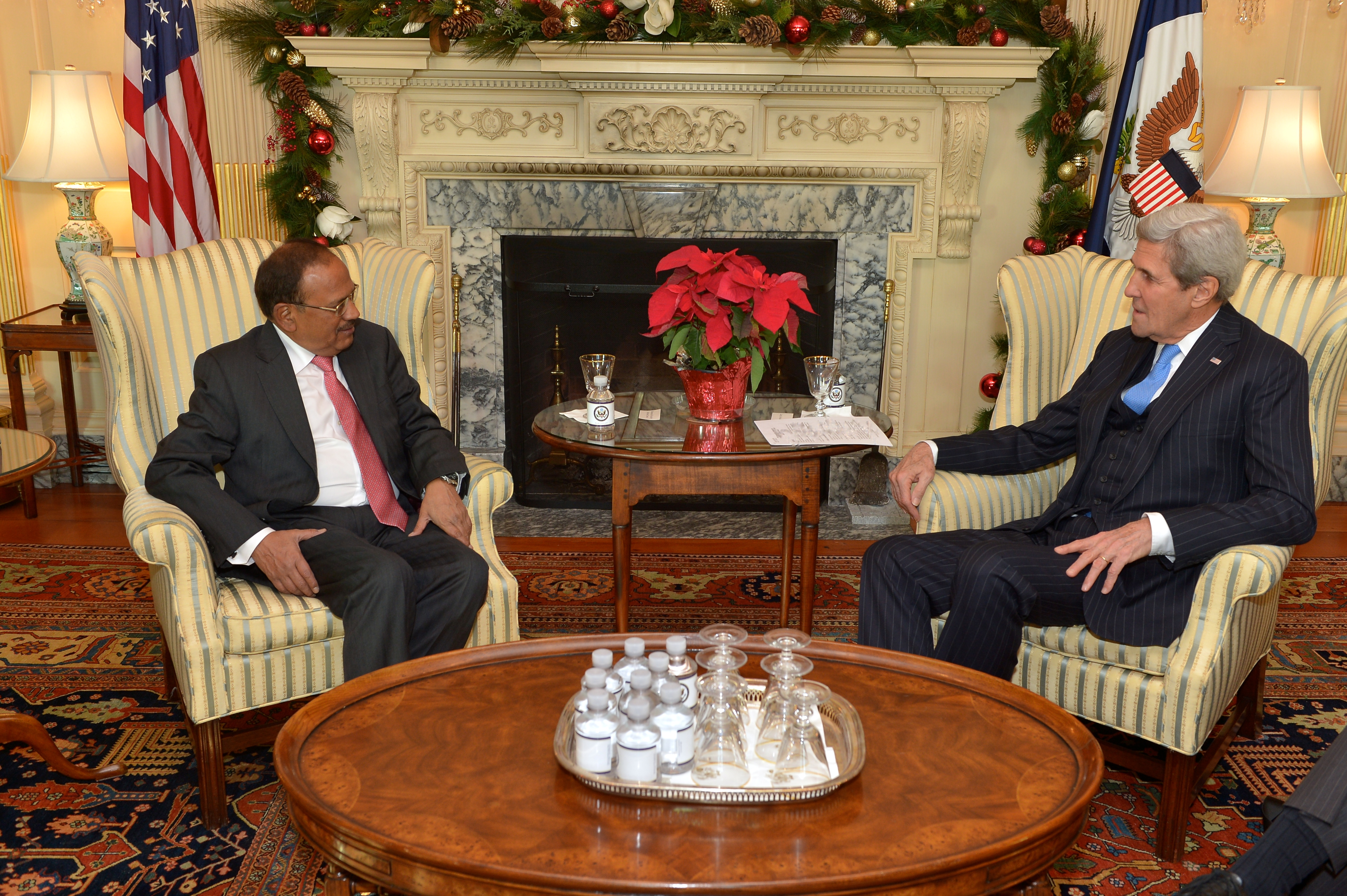
NSA Doval meets with US secretary of state John Kerry in Washington, D.C.

=== First term ===
On 30 May 2014, Doval was appointed as India's fifth National Security Advisor (NSA). Doval will hold the post as long as Narendra Modi is the Prime Minister, or until further orders.

He was appointed as the Prime Minister's special envoy to Afghanistan.

In June 2014, Doval facilitated the return of 46 Indian nurses who were trapped in a hospital in Tikrit, Iraq, following the capture of Mosul by ISIL. Doval, flew to Iraq on 25 June 2014 to understand the position on the ground and make high-level contacts in the Iraqi government. Although the exact circumstances of their release are unclear, on 5 July 2014, ISIL militants handed the nurses to Kurdish authorities at Erbil city and an Air India plane specially-arranged by the Indian government brought them back home to Kochi.

Along with Army Chief General Dalbir Singh Suhag, Doval planned a cross-border military operation against National Socialist Council of Nagaland (NSCN-K) separatists operating out of Myanmar. Indian officials claimed that the mission was a success and 20–38 separatists belonging to Nationalist Socialist Council of Nagaland (NSCN-K) were killed in the operation. However, the Myanmar government denied the strikes. According to Myanmar officials, the Indian operation against NSCN-K took place entirely on the Indian side of the border.

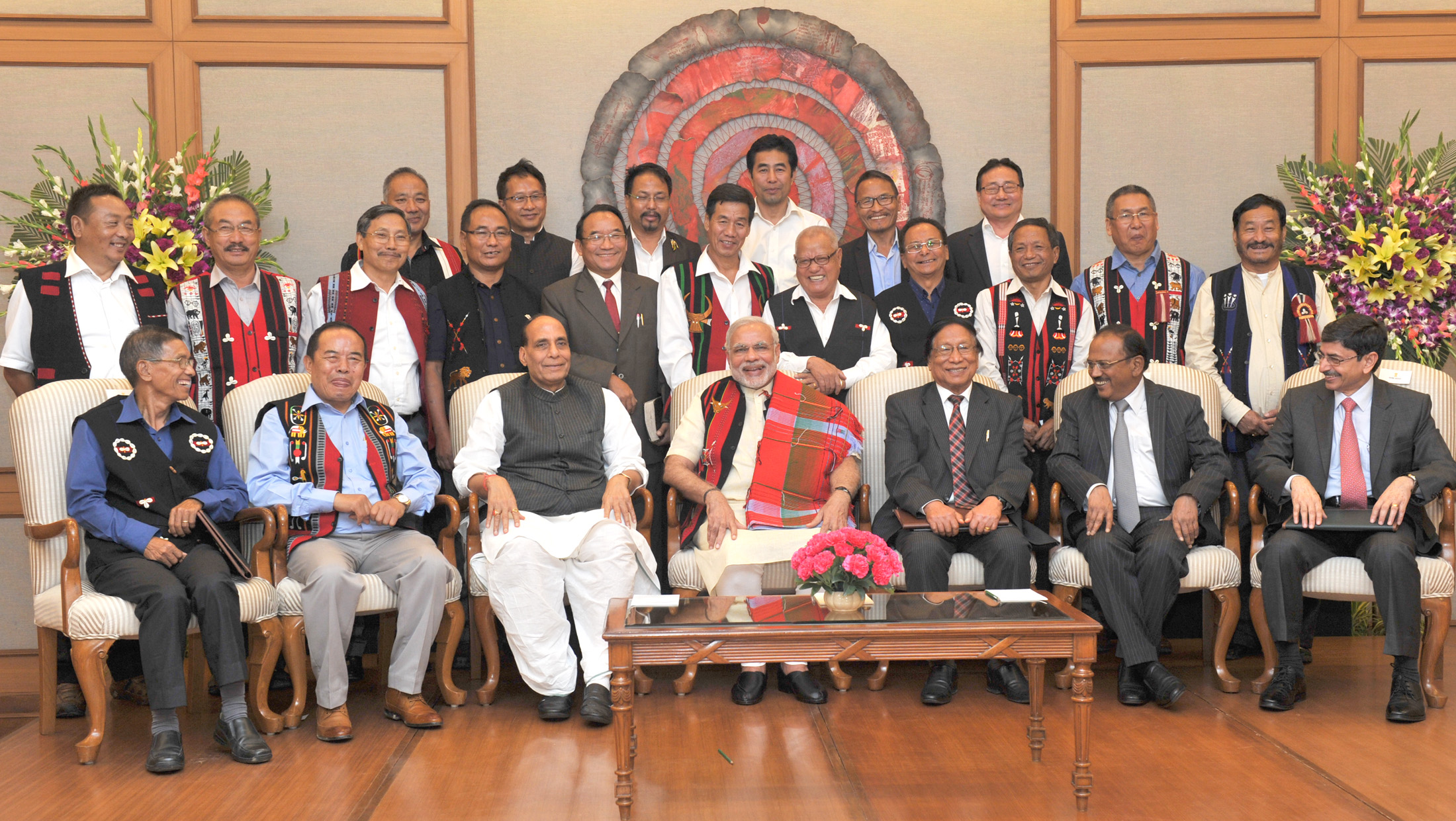
NSA Doval at the witnessing of the signing of the peace accord between Government of India and National Socialist Council of Nagaland

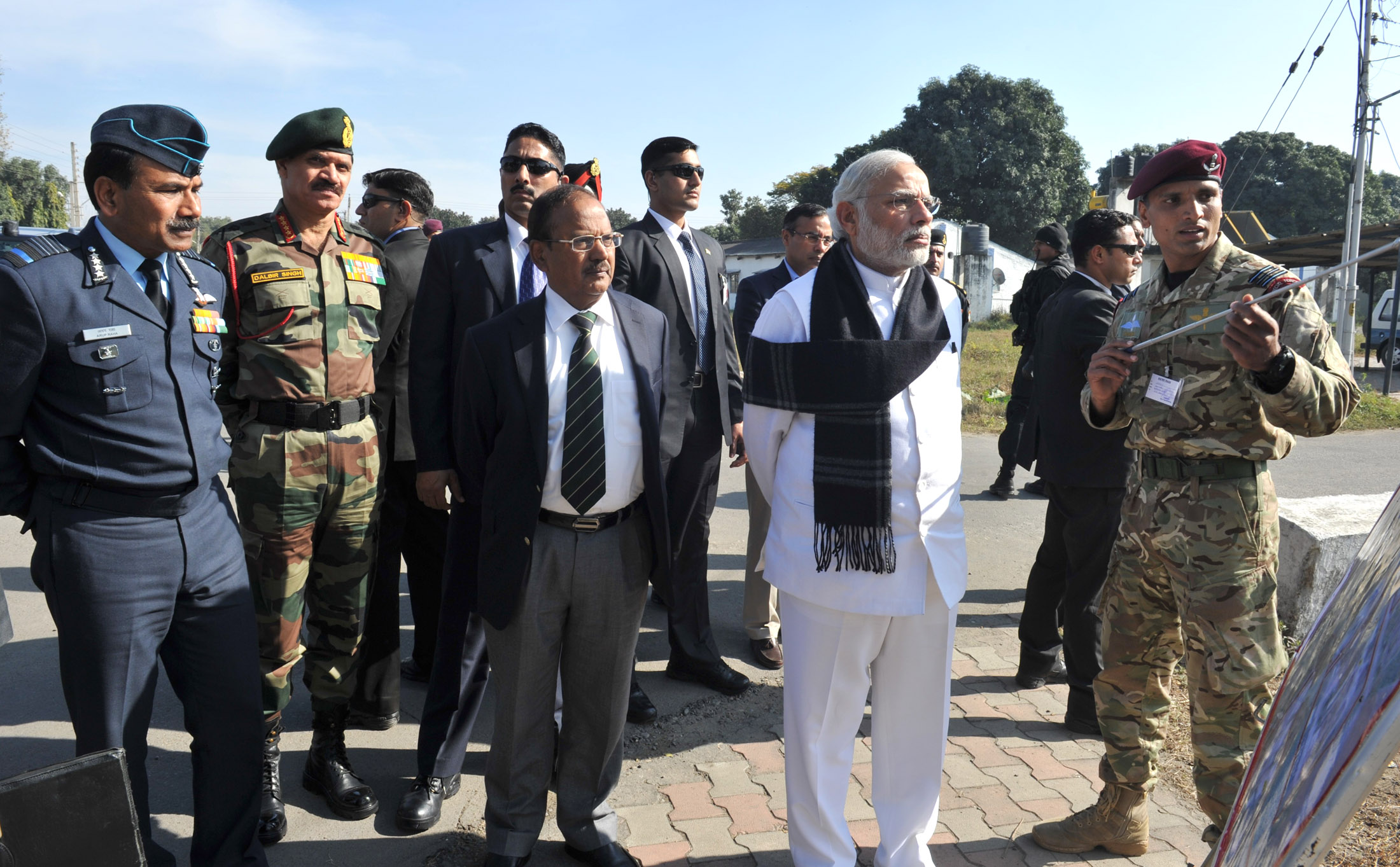
Indian PM Modi with the NSA Doval, the Army Chief Dalbir Singh Suhag and the Air Force Chief Arup Raha at Pathankot Airbase

He is widely credited for the doctrinal shift in Indian national security policy in relation to Pakistan. It was speculated that the September 2016 Indian strikes in Pakistan-controlled Kashmir were his brainchild. Doval is widely credited along with then Foreign Secretary S. Jaishankar and Indian Ambassador to China Vijay Keshav Gokhale, for resolving the Doklam standoff through diplomatic channels and negotiations. As NSA, Doval is also the special representative responsible for the Special Representative mechanism on the India–China boundary question.

In October 2018, he was appointed as the Chairman of the Strategic Policy Group, which is the first tier of a three-tier structure at the National Security Council and forms the nucleus of its decision-making apparatus. As NSA, Doval is ex officio agency executive of the National Security Council, chairperson of the Defence Planning Committee, and executive council head of the Nuclear Command Authority.

After a Pakistan-based militant attacked a CRPF convoy with a car bomb in Pulwama which resulted in the deaths of 40 CRPF personnel, the Indian Air Force conducted an airstrike on terrorist bases in Pakistan Doval was one of the seven persons who knew about India's classified 2019 Balakot airstrike, including Indian Navy, Army, Air Force chiefs and prime minister Narendra Modi. Following the airstrike and retaliatory 2019 Jammu and Kashmir airstrikes and subsequent capture of Indian pilot Abhinandan Varthaman by Pakistani military, Ajit Doval held talks with US Secretary of State and National Security Advisor to secure the release of the Indian pilot.

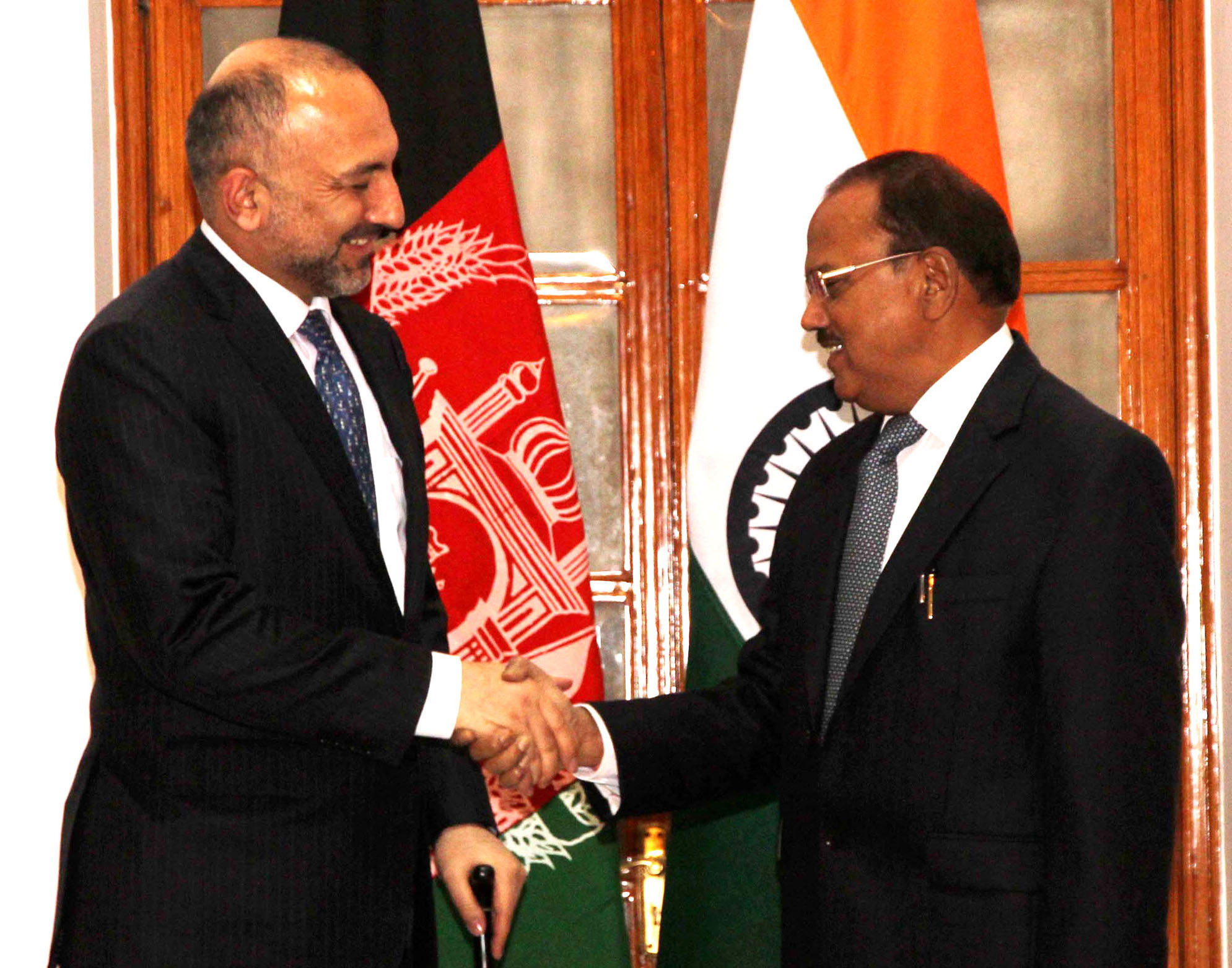
NSA Doval meeting the Afghan NSA Haneef Atmar

=== Second term ===
On 3 June 2019, he was reappointed as NSA for another 5 years and granted the personal rank of a Cabinet Minister. Doval is the first NSA to hold such a rank. He was previously a Minister of State. Doval is widely considered to be one of Modi's most powerful and trusted advisors, with major influence over India's national security and foreign affairs. He would go onto become India's longest serving NSA.

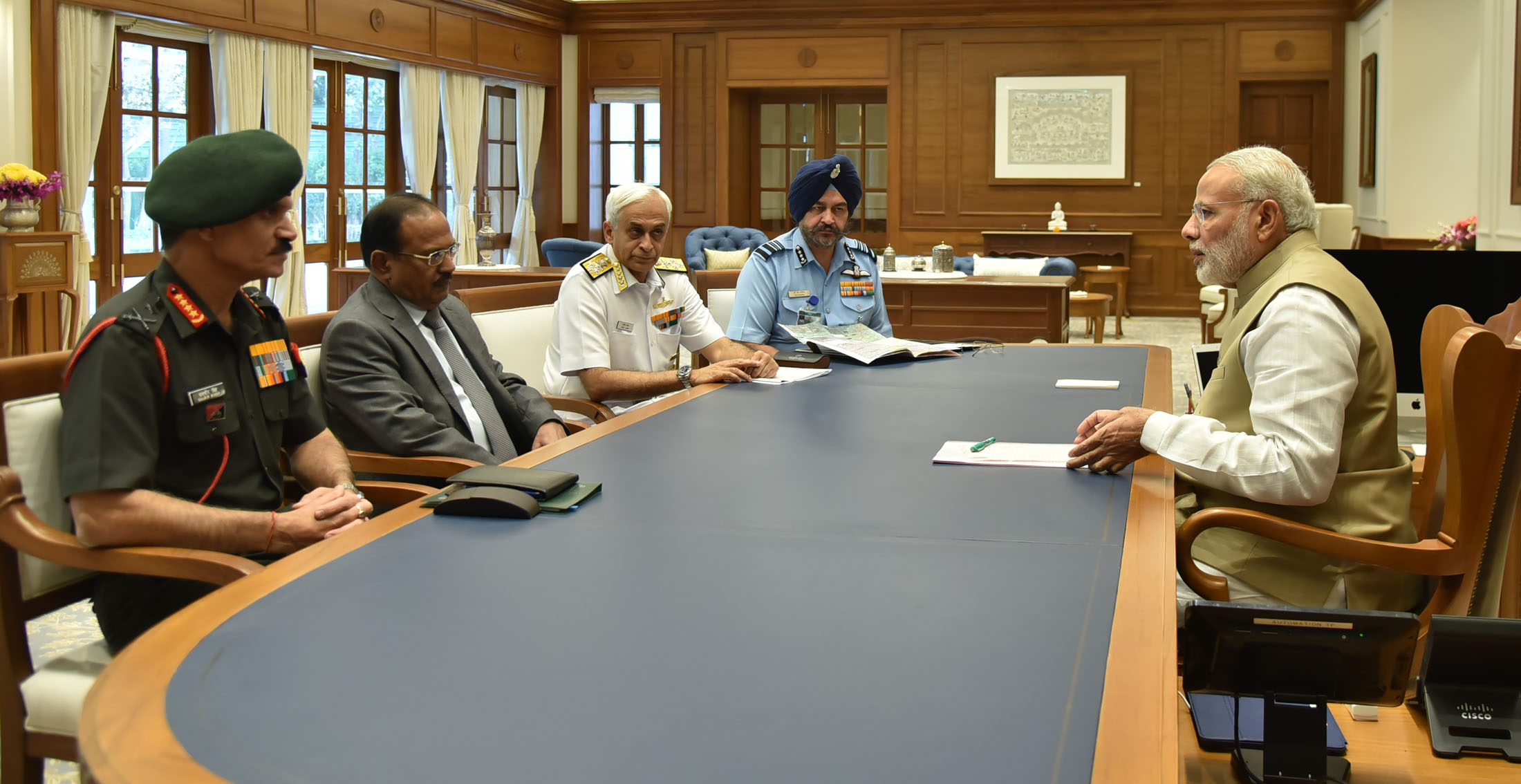
NSA Doval, along with Army, Navy, and Air Force Chief meeting PM Modi

He was also an instrumental figure in revocation of the special status of Jammu and Kashmir.

On 26 February 2020, Ajit Doval walked the streets of riot-hit northeast Delhi to assess the situation and reassure the local residents.

Following the 2020–2021 China–India skirmishes, four interactions took place between Doval and his Chinese counterpart, Wang Yi.

On 15 May 2020, the military forces of Myanmar handed over a group of 22 militant leaders, active in Assam and other northeast states, to the Indian government. This was made possible through negotiations headed by Doval.

On 15 September 2020, Doval walked out of a virtual SCO meeting after Pakistan projected a fictitious map omitting parts of India.

=== Third term ===
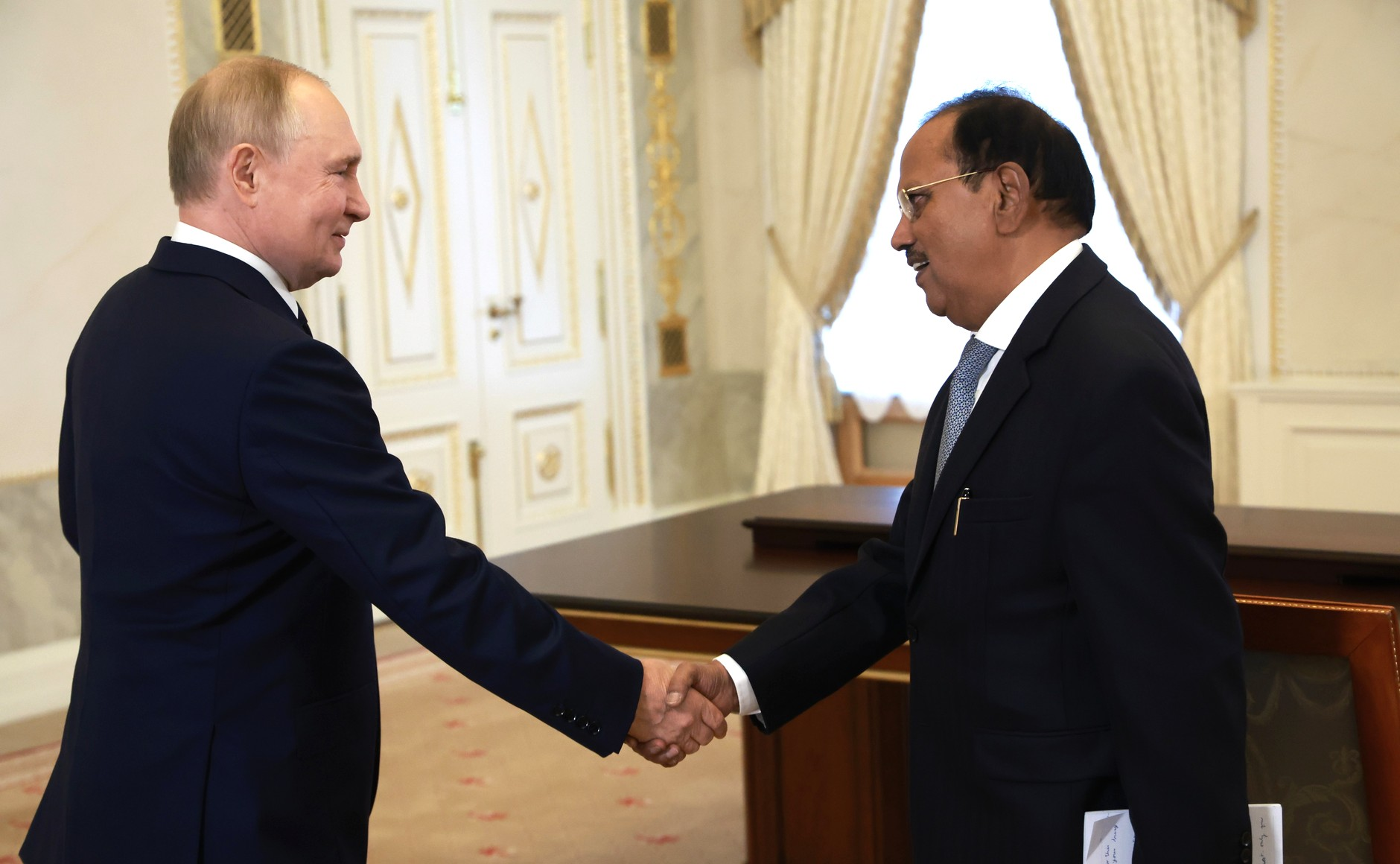
Vladimir Putin received NSA Doval in Constantine Palace in 2024

On 13 June 2024, Ajit Doval was granted third five-year extension for his tenure as National Security Advisor of India.

In the 2025 India–Pakistan conflict, following the Pahalgam terror attack, NSA Ajit Doval played a key role in formulating India's strategic response. He coordinated Operation Sindoor, a series of precision airstrikes on terrorist camps located in Pakistan. Indian officials described the operation as "measured and non-escalatory," aimed at neutralizing terrorist threats without provoking a broader conflict.

In January 2026, Doval addressed the "Viksit Bharat Young Leaders Dialogue," where he called on the youth to "avenge our history" through proactive national reconstruction. This address was noted for its departure from traditional scholarly focus on historical loot, framing nation building instead as a form of civilizational resurgence.

On 9 October, 2026 the United States of department served summonses involving Doval to the Indian Embassy in Washington DC. The lawsuit concerns Gurpatwant Singh Pannun seeking damages over an alleged assassination plot by the Indian officials. Indian government rejected these charges on 10 November, 2026.

== Views and security positions ==
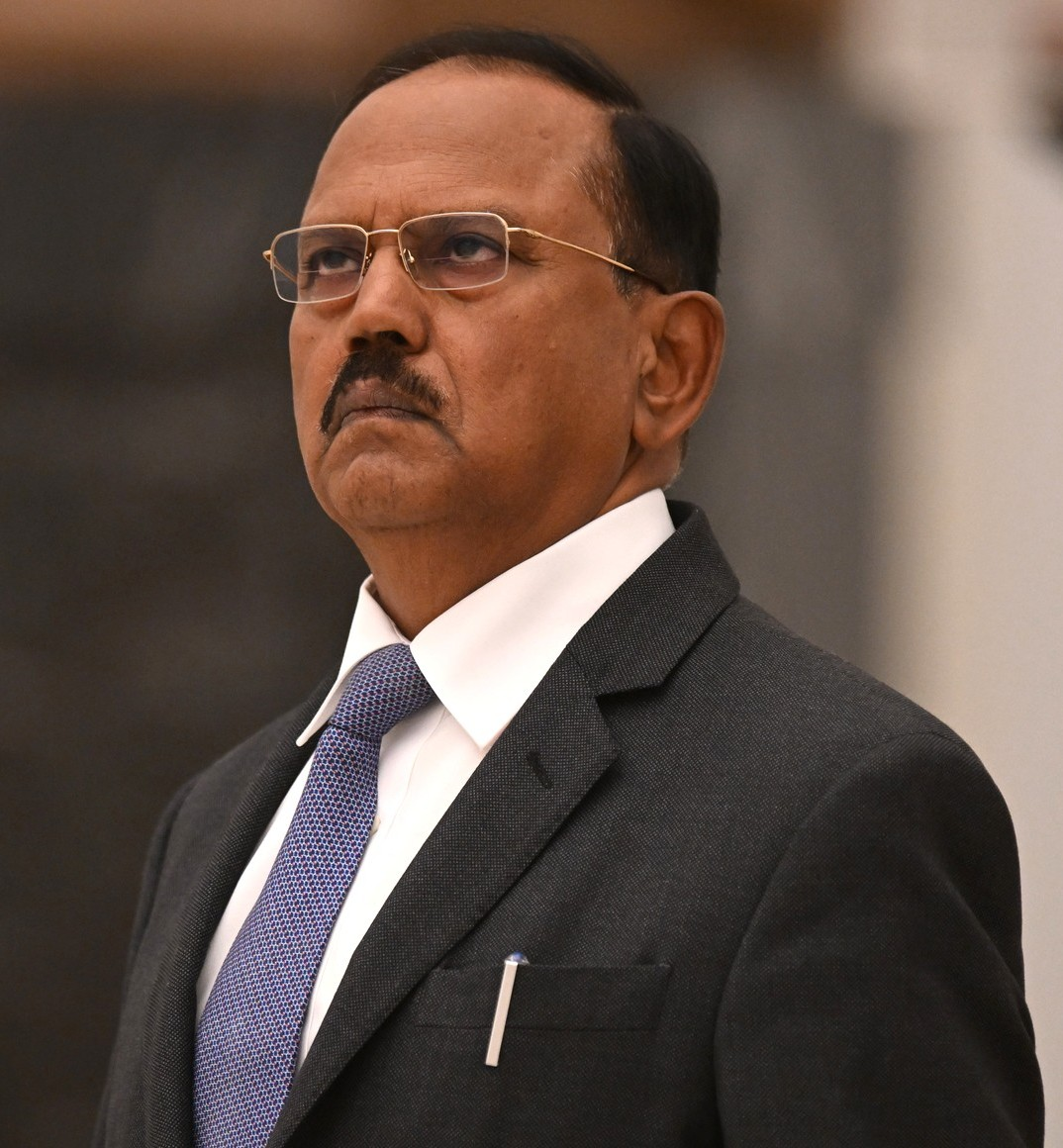
Doval in 2023

A. G. Noorani and A. S. Dulat have, among others, called Doval a "hawk" or "hawkish"; further a "cautious hawk", a Pakistan hawk, and a China hawk.

=== Fourth-generation warfare ===
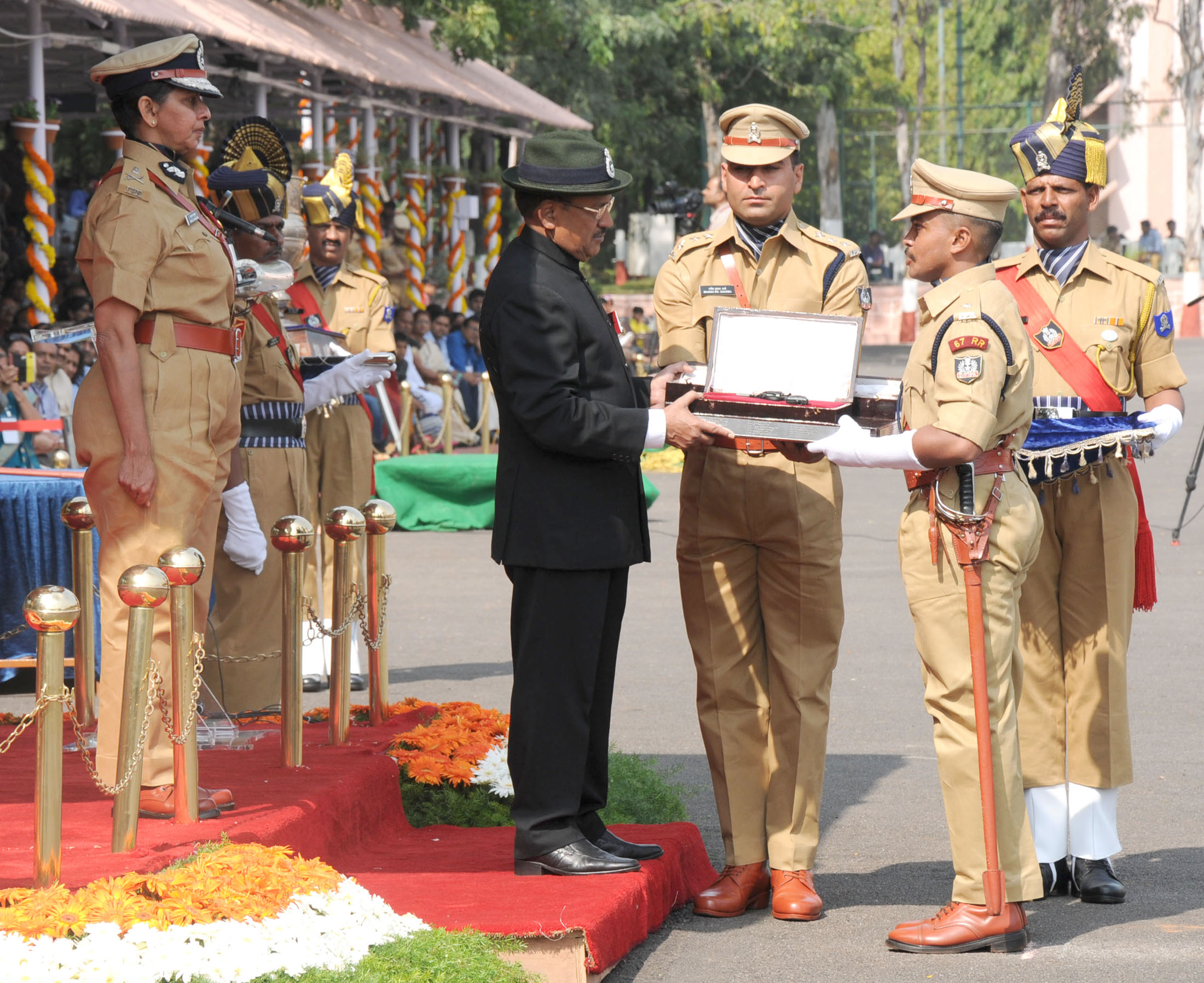
NSA Doval presenting awards to IPS probationers at their investiture ceremony, at the Sardar Vallabhbhai Patel National Police Academy

Doval, speaking at the passing out of the 2014 batch of IPS officers, said "You are now in the phase of fourth generation war... It is a warfare with an invisible enemy... it's a warfare, in which the civil society is both the battleground and... the people that you have to protect." He states this is not a war of armies but a war of policemen. In the passing out parade of the 2021 batch of IPS probationers he reiterated the dangers that civil society present over the problems of conventional war. Critics argue that Doval's conceptualisation of fourth-generation warfare has "dangerous implications" and that Doval does not define what he means by "civil society". According to Aruna Roy, Doval was ignoring his obligations to the spirit of the constitution and to his office in his speech to the probationers.

At the 6th Pune Dialogue on National Security in 2021, Doval explained how this form of warfare targets people rather than territory and territorial frontiers, that is, it targets civil society and through them cumulatively the will of a nation.

=== National security ===
According to Doval, the greatest threat to a nations' security is not external aggression but internal security. Doval has stated "India's internal vulnerabilities are much higher than its external vulnerabilities". His writings regularly tilt towards the importance of national issues as compared to external ones. In 2006 and 2011 respectively, Doval called infiltration of Bangladeshis and left wing extremism as the biggest internal security problems. In 2025, Doval stated that "left-wing extremism has reduced to less than 11 per cent areas than what existed in 2014".

==== Borders ====
In 2024, during the 21st Border Security Force investiture ceremony and Rustamji memorial lecture, Doval said that India's economic progress and internal security has been hampered by undefined borders in the north and west, and that even in the future India's borders will not be as secure as needed when taken in accordance with the country's economic growth.

==== Bio-security ====
In the backdrop of the COVID-19 pandemic in India, Doval highlighted the importance of anticipating biological threats, since scientific research can be misused for harmful purposes.

==== Governance ====
At the annual Sardar Patel memorial lecture in 2018 titled 'Dream India: 2030, avoiding the pitfalls' Doval stated that for the next ten years India needed a strong government with a "total mandate" which could take hard decisions which may not be populist. At the Sardar Patel memorial lecture on governance in 2025, Doval shared a "security man’s perspective" on the importance governance has on securing a nation. He said that weak governance has led to regime changes in India's neghbourhood in countries such as Bangladesh, Sri Lanka and Nepal.

==== Nuclear deterrence ====
Speaking at a Munich Security Conference meeting in Delhi in October 2014, he stated that India has shifted its nuclear stance "from credible minimum deterrence to credible deterrence".

=== Pakistan ===
During the tenth Nani Palkhivala memorial lecture in February 2014, when talking about how to tackle Pakistan, he stated three postures- defensive, defensive-offence, and offensive. Doval said that India had so far been defensive and that it was time to turn to a defensive-offensive stance, that is, "to defend ourselves, we go to the place from where the offence is coming". He rules out an offensive strategy as that could lead to the nuclear threshold being crossed. During the lecture he stated that if another attack like the 2008 Mumbai attacks happened, Pakistan may be split. This three level engagement has come to be known as the 'Doval Doctrine'. The 2016 Indian Line of Control strike has been called "a perfect example of defensive offense". The 2019 Balakot airstrike, in response to the 2019 Pulwama attack, has also been equated to the doctrine. It has also been compared to the slogan "ghar mein ghus kar marenge" (transl. we will enter your house and hit you).

The doctrine could also be felt at the 21st Lalit Doshi memorial lecture in August 2015 where, during the interactive session, Doval responded to a question saying "India has a mind-set where it punches below its weight. We have to punch not above our weight, we have to punch not below our weight, we have to increase our weight and punch proportionately". He added that if you have power but do not yield it, then that is as good as not having that power. Doval has mentioned the concept of "offensive defence", in relation to Pakistan, as early as 2006 during an interview; the interview was days after the 2006 Mumbai train bombings. 'Defensive offence' and 'offensive defence' are similar however in the case of the latter, an offensive stance is taken preemptively with a defense purpose.

A. G. Noorani has written that the "three themes of the Doval doctrine are irrelevance of morality, extremism freed from calculation or calibration, and reliance on military might". Harsh Mander has labelled these themes as 'amorality', 'offence' and 'militarism'. When there is a question regarding the morality between an individual and the state, the state comes first. When there is a question between defence and offense, offense should be prioritised. And third, militarism, might is right, force by any means where the only objective is to win.

=== Terrorism ===
At the Sardar Patel memorial lecture on governance, on 31 October 2025, Doval stated that "terrorism in this country has been effectively countered"; he went on to explain that Jammu and Kashmir is a theatre for a proxy war or covert warfare. Doval stated in 2019 that the media is an important component in the terrorism ecosystem. In 2023, speaking at an event in New Delhi, in the presence of Mohammad bin Abdulkarim Al-Issa, Doval stated that "terrorism is not linked to any religion".

== Awards and recognitions ==
- He has been awarded honorary doctorates from Dr. Bhimrao Ambedkar University (formerly Agra University) in December 2017; Kumaun University in May 2018; Amity University in November 2018; Hemwati Nandan Bahuguna Garhwal University in December 2019; G. B. Pant University of Agriculture and Technology in February 2023; and Central University of Punjab in March 2024.
- Doval was the youngest police officer to receive the Police Medal for Meritorious Service. He was given the award by Indira Gandhi in 1974 after six years in the police force.
- Doval was later awarded the President's Police Medal for Distinguished Service.
- In 1989, Doval was granted one of the highest gallantry awards, the Kirti Chakra, becoming the first police officer to receive a medal previously given only as a military honour. He received the award for his role in Operation Black Thunder II. His official citation reads,

"Shri Ajit Kumar Doval was given several sensitive assignments directed against certain hard core terrorists. These assignments required a high degree of courage and dedication. It also put his personal security in peril. Regardless of the risk to his personal safety, Shri Doval prepared and executed plans against terrorists with a high degree of success bringing glory to his organization. During these assignments, there were long periods during which his whereabouts were not known which even caused concern that he has been caught and possibly tortured.

In one such assignment, he was required to deal with a group of terrorists, some of whom were considered notorious and dangerous. Dealing with them posed a grave danger to his own life. Ignoring the risk involved to his personal security, Shri Doval prepared and executed a plan for enticing the terrorists and succeeded in trapping some of the wanted notorious terrorists. In carrying out these assignments, Shri Ajit Kumar Doval has not only exhibited remarkable resourcefulness and devotion to duty, but he has carried out his task with a single-mindedness of purpose and shown exemplary courage even risking his life on several occasions."

- In 2022, he was awarded the Uttarakhand Gaurav Samman.

== In popular culture ==
- Doval appeared on Epic TV's show Adrishya, in which his success against Khalistani separatist during Operation Black Thunder was featured.
- In the film Uri: The Surgical Strike (2019), his cinematic character was portrayed by Paresh Rawal.
- In 2025 web series Salakaar for JioHotstar was based on his covert operation in Pakistan in 1970s, his role was played by Naveen Kasturia (as his younger self) and Purnendu Bhattacharya (as his present self) alias as Adhir Dayal.
- In the film Dhurandhar (2025) and its sequel Dhurandhar: The Revenge (2026), the character "Ajay Sanyal" portrayed by R. Madhavan was heavily inspired by Doval.

== Selected bibliography ==
- Doval, Ajit (14 April 2006). "Red star over India". The Indian Express.
- Doval, Ajit (1 June 2006). "Ways to defeat ourselves". The Indian Express.
- Doval, Ajit (19 September 2006). "A strategic setback for India". The Indian Express.
- Doval, Ajit (2007). "Islamic Terrorism in South Asia and India's Strategic Response". Policing: A Journal of Policy and Practice. 1 (1): 63–69.
- Doval, Ajit (29 August 2007). "If Sharif Comes Back". The Times of India.
- Doval, Ajit (30 August 2007). "Needed: war on error". The Indian Express – via VIF.
- Doval, Ajit (16 November 2007). "Djinn is out of Pak bottle". The Indian Express. Archived from the original on 25 January 2025.
- Doval, Ajit (23 December 2007). "Growth of Maoists fuelled by politicians". Mail Today – via VIF.
- Doval, Ajit (26 May 2008). "Two Clever Tips To Surprise Him". Outlook. Archived from the original on 27 January 2011.
- Doval, Ajit (6 December 2008). "The elusive national counter-terrorism policy". Pragati. Archived from the original on 2 October 2011.
- Doval, Ajit (25 August 2009). "Bleeding From Within". The New Indian Express – via VIF.
- Doval, Ajit (1 September 2009). "Abject surrender at Sharm-el-Sheikh". The New Indian Express. Archived from the original on 28 May 2012.
- Doval, Ajit (21 November 2009). "Terrorist threat and response capability – India a year after". Deccan Herald.
- Doval, Ajit (10 April 2010). "Naxalism: Need to revisit basics". The Economic Times.
- Doval, Ajit (June 2010). "India's Strategic Criticality: Need for an Effective National Response". Eternal India. Archived from the original on 28 June 2010 – via VIF.
- Doval, Ajit (4 August 2010). "Complicated encounters". The Indian Express.
- Doval, Ajit (8 August 2010). "This new offensive needs new response". The Times of India.
- Doval, Ajit (31 January 2011). "China Factor in North East Insurgency – Alarming Signals". Vivekananda International Foundation.
- Doval, Ajit (3 February 2011). "Internal Security – Need for Course Correction". Vivekananda International Foundation.
- Doval, Ajit (12 February 2012). "Working in real time". Hindustan Times. Archived from the original on 28 May 2014.
- Doval, Ajit (6 June 2013). "Maoist War Against India: Time for United & Strong Response". Vivekananda International Foundation.
- Doval, Ajit (July 2013), Chinese Intelligence : From a Party Outfit to Cyber Warriors (PDF), Vivekananda International Foundation
- Doval, Ajit (2 September 2013). "Moderate and Balanced Afghanistan: Imperative for Regional Security". Vivekananda International Foundation.

Interviews

- Doval, Ajit (24 April 2006). "'Why do you say Maoists are not terrorists?'" (Interview). Interviewed by Sheela Bhatt. Rediff.
- Doval, Ajit (26 April 2006). "'Bangladeshi infiltration is the biggest threat'" (Interview). Interviewed by Sheela Bhatt. Rediff.
- Doval, Ajit (22 July 2006). "'We Need To Shift To Offensive Defence'" (Interview). Interviewed by Outlook.
- Doval, Ajit (6 August 2006). "Pak must destroy terror infrastructure: Doval" (Interview). Interviewed by Rajeev Sharma. The Tribune.
- Doval, Ajit (30 December 2007). "It's a civil war situation in Pakistan: Doval" (Interview). Interviewed by Rajeev Sharma. The Tribune.
- Doval, Ajit. "IBN Live Interview" (Interview). Interviewed by Multiple. Archived from the original on 13 July 2011.
- Doval, Ajit (27 September 2008). "'Move to the offensive mode'" (Interview). Interviewed by Harinder Baweja. Tehelka. Archived from the original on 1 December 2008.
- Doval, Ajit (20 December 2008). "'We need a US-model security info network'" (Interview). Interviewed by The New Indian Express. Archived from the original on 28 May 2012.
- Doval, Ajit (23 October 2009). "'Time to stay a step ahead of terrorists'" (Interview). Interviewed by Vicky Nanjappa. Rediff.

== See also ==
- Ravindra Kaushik – spy of India.
- Bahirji Naik – spy of Chatrapati Shivaji Maharaj

Government offices
Preceded by Shivshankar Menon	National Security Advisor; 2014–present	Incumbent
Police appointments
Preceded by K. P. Singh	Director of Intelligence Bureau; 2004–2005	Succeeded by E. S. L. Narasimhan
