= T. V. Ravichandran =

Indian Police Service officer

T V Ravichandran IPS (Retired)

Deputy National Security Advisor of India
- Incumbent
- Assumed office 15 July 2024
- Preceded by: Rajinder Khanna

Personal details
- Born: 3 August 1964 (age 62) India

T V Ravichandran (born 3 August 1964) is the current Deputy National Security Advisor of India. and the former special director of the Intelligence Bureau. He is the former Director General of Police in Tamil Nadu and a retired Indian Police Service (IPS) officer of the 1990 batch in Tamil Nadu cadre.
