= Anish Dayal Singh =

Former Director General of the Central Reserve Police Force

Anish Dayal Singh IPS (Retd.)

Deputy National Security Advisor of India
- Incumbent
- Assumed office 25 August 2025
- Preceded by: Pankaj Kumar Singh

Director General of Central Reserve Police Force
- In office 1 January 2024 – 31 December 2024
- Preceded by: Sujoy Lal Thaosen
- Succeeded by: Gyanendra Pratap Singh

Personal details
- Born: 9 December 1964 (age 61) Prayagraj, Uttar Pradesh, India
- Occupation: Retired IPS officer
- Profession: Civil servant
- Awards: Indian Police Medal awarded by the central government for Meritorious Service (2004) President's Police Medal for Distinguished Service (2012)

Anish Dayal Singh is an Indian statesman who has served as the Deputy National Security Advisor since August 2025. Singh previously served in the Indian Police Service and served as Director General of the CRPF until December 2024.

== Early life and education ==
Singh was born in 1964 in Prayagraj, Uttar Pradesh.

After being selected for the Indian Police Service in 1988, he completed training as a police officer at the Sardar Vallabhbhai Patel National Police Academy located in Hyderabad, Telangana.

After completion of training, he was allotted Manipur cadre on 21 August 1989 and his brother Saumitra Dayal Singh is a judge in Allahabad High Court.

== Career ==
Singh previously held an important position in his career, He served as the Director general (Additional Charge) of ITBP and SSB and served as the Director general of CRPF from 1 January 2024 and served there till 31 December 2024.

== Awards ==
Singh was awarded to Indian Police Medal awarded by the central government for Meritorious Service (2004-2012) for his special service by the central government of India.

- PSDM Medal (twice; second time the medal was awarded in 1997).
- Police Medal for Meritorious Service (PMMS) (twice; the second medal was given to him in 2004).
- President's Police Medal for Distinguished Service (PPMDS) (2012).
