= Ashok Chaturvedi =

Indian police and intelligence official

Secretary of the Research and Analysis Wing
- In office 1 February 2007 – 31 January 2009
- Preceded by: P. K. H. Tharakan
- Succeeded by: K. C. Verma

Ashok Chaturvedi, IPS (1947 - September 18, 2011) was the chief of India's external intelligence agency the Research and Analysis Wing (R&AW) from 1 February 2007 to 31 January 2009. Chaturvedi succeeded P.K.H. Tharakan, a 1968 batch officer of the IPS Kerala cadre who retired on 31 January 2007.

Chaturvedi was part of the Indian Police Service (IPS) as a 1970 batch officer from the Madhya Pradesh cadre before joining R&AW's own service cadre the Research and Analysis Service (RAS). Chaturvedi, who was an analyst on Bangladesh and Nepal, had also served in the United Kingdom and Canada besides a stint in the Indian state of Jammu and Kashmir.

== The V.K. Singh Book Dispute ==
Controversy and media speculation about his future has also continued to follow Chaturvedi's career with his failed attempts to ban the publication and sale of the book, India's External Intelligence: Secrets of Research and Analysis Wing R&AW, written by Major General V.K. Singh, formerly a colleague and Joint Secretary in R&AW. In the book, V.K. Singh made a number of claims about R&AW including petulant conduct from a senior officer within the organization who went on unauthorised leave for eight months after being overlooked for promotion and who was tagged with malfeasance and ineptitude. The book was published and distributed both in India and abroad in June 2007 and the matter had largely been forgotten.

However, Chaturvedi curiously resurrected the issue months later when V.K. Singh's home was raided on 21 September 2007 by officials from the Central Bureau of Investigation (CBI). A case was registered against V.K. Singh under the Official Secrets Act of India (OSA). The following day the offices of the publishers of the book, Manas Publications, were also raided.

Addressing a media conference where former intelligence officials were present to support him, V.K. Singh spectacularly revealed that the R&AW officer who went on an eight-month leave of absence without permission was in fact Ashok Chaturvedi. Singh said that,

... an act of gross indiscipline…can he (Chaturvedi) bring discipline to the organization if he does not attend office for eight months?

The investigative magazine, Outlook, stated that Chaturvedi appeared to have a personal vendetta against V.K. Singh. They also claimed that sources from the CBI had confirmed to them that the R&AW officer, mentioned in VK Singh's book, who went on unofficial leave for eight months was indeed Chaturvedi.

The raid on V.K. Singh's house had also been embarrassing for Chaturvedi as initially the wrong address, belonging to another retired R&AW official, was raided in East Delhi instead of the author's house in Gurgaon. It took the officials another three hours before they finally reached the correct residence. Ironically, the whole controversy has embarrassed the Indian government and revived the sales of Singh's book. In fact, the publishers ordered another print run of 3,000 copies because of the high demand. The whole incident has also created a new debate over the freedom of expression in India and the level of public accountability of the countries' intelligence agencies. Legal experts also believe it would be a futile attempt to charge V.K. Singh under the Official Secrets Act, particularly as other former intelligence officials have released books that have been deemed to be more damaging in terms of disclosing R&AW's secrets, but no action was ever taken against them.

Chaturvedi had sanctioned publication of a book written by K. Sankaran Nair, a former head of R&AW, in which the Gandhi family, particularly former Prime Minister Indira Gandhi, is reported to have been behind a number of controversial deals involving bribery. It has been questioned as to why Chaturvedi tried to gag V.K. Singh yet allowed Nair's book to be published without any scrutiny. This has brought Chaturvedi into a direct confrontation with the Nehru-Gandhi Family.

After the V.K. Singh book dispute, Chaturvedi issued a directive wanting all R&AW's current employees to sign a declaration that they would not write about their careers after they leave the agency. Opinion, however, is divided on the issue as many say it's unfair to censor such voices. The declaration wants to bar officers from writing about the agency even after the two-year cooling off period post-retirement. The new ruling would mean that officers would have to take permission to write and even then it cannot be published without prior clearance from the agency. The declaration says for any violation the officer will be held "liable for action", such as no pension, to charges under the Official Secrets Act.

== The Colombo Spy Scandal ==
In October 2007 another highly damaging controversy erupted for Chaturvedi when it transpired R&AW was forced to recall one of its officers who was stationed at the Indian High Commission in Colombo, Sri Lanka. Ravi Nair, who held the rank of Joint Secretary within R&AW, was sent back to New Delhi when it transpired that he had developed "irregular relations" with a Chinese woman. Officials posted at the Indian High Commission, sent reports about Nair to their respective departments paving the way for his recall. What was of particular concern, was that Nair had started the relationship with the same woman during a previous posting to the Indian Consulate in Hong Kong. He apparently continued to maintain ties with her after he was posted to Colombo in 2006.

Infighting within R&AW also may have led to the Nair's recall from Sri Lanka. In fact, Nair's activities had aroused suspicion prior to his posting in Colombo, whilst at the agency's Chennai office when it was alleged he was involved in another extramarital affair. Following reports from the Chennai office, then head of R&AW P.K.H. Tharakan, directed his second-in-command at the time and the current R&AW chief Ashok Chaturvedi to conduct an inquiry and take suitable steps. However, Chaturvedi did not take any action and conversely Nair's name was put forward for the Colombo posting, considered one of R&AW's most sensitive stations. Outlook Magazine stated that had Chaturvedi conducted an inquiry and taken action at Tharakan's behest, Nair would never have been considered for the posting to Sri Lanka and R&AW could have saved itself the embarrassment Nair has caused.

The Colombo and Chennai scandals were apparently not Nair's first transgression. At various other foreign postings and travels, several allegations were filed against him in internal R&AW reports by senior intelligence officers. Prior to his posting in Sri Lanka, Nair had previously been stationed to the United States, Bhutan, Pakistan and Hong Kong but despite all the controversy surrounding him, Nair continued to receive support from Chaturvedi and another former head of R&AW, K. Sankaran Nair. Instead of being reprimanded by Chaturvedi, Nair has been allowed to carry on with his duties.

== The Indian Intelligence Briefing Mishap ==
In December 2007, it was revealed that there had been a massive intelligence failure inside R&AW. It was in relation to the state of emergency declared by the President of Pakistan, Pervez Musharraf. Apparently, just days before Musharraf installed emergency rule, Chaturvedi had advised the Indian Prime Minister, Manmohan Singh, that the situation in Pakistan was stable and that there was no chance that Musharraf would declare martial law.

Not anticipating any major change in Pakistan, Chaturvedi did not feel the need to prepare for any unpredictable change in circumstances. On 3 November 2007, Musharraf suspended the constitution and declared a state of emergency. New Delhi was caught completely off guard and the Indian prime minister apparently "was livid."

== The Nepal Exposure ==
Unlike his predecessors who specialised in Pakistan or China, Chaturvedi is the first head of India's Intelligence agency whose area of expertise is Nepal. However, in December 2007 the R&AW Chief faced another embarrassing scandal when the 'Nepal Weekly' magazine revealed that R&AW was trying to interfere in the internal political dynamics of Nepal. The magazine also revealed the names of various R&AW agents working at the Indian embassy in the Nepalese capital, Kathmandu which included Suresh Dhundiya, R&AW's station chief in Kathmandu, and his deputies Alok Tiwari posted as First Secretary (Education) and K. V. Johri, a counsellor. It was also publicized that Dhundiya was being replaced as station chief by Alok Joshi. This revelation resulted in Joshi being exposed before he even assumed his new position thus compromising R&AW's intelligence apparatus in Nepal. To make matters worse, Nepalese newspapers were also able to find out the detailed travel plans of Chaturvedi's visit to Nepal in December 2007, including the airline he flew on and which hotel he stayed in.

Chaturvedi forced the interim government of Girija Prasad Koirala to award a contract to an Indian firm for a hydropower project. It has also been alleged that Chaturvedi may have financially benefited personally from the deal. Questions have been raised in India as to why the head of an Indian intelligence agency was promoting a commercial company in Nepal.

The timing of these events coincided with worsening relations between India and Nepal. In a snub to India, Nepal's Foreign Minister Sahana Pradhan requested a high level Chinese delegation visiting Kathmandu to extend the Tibet rail into Nepal. The request carries significance against the backdrop of Nepal's warning to India not to go ahead with a proposed highway along the India-Nepal border.

The Telegraph Weekly of Nepal commented that "With R&AW facing continuous debacle in its Nepal affairs, it is highly likely that the R&AW machinery will come in a heavy way in order to regain its lost ground in Nepal. Chaturvedi is being told to pack up by the New Delhi set-up, it is talked".

== Diplomatic Faux Pas ==
In a number of important meetings, Chaturvedi did not appear to know who he was actually meeting. On one particular occasion, Timothy J. Keating, the commander of the United States Pacific Command made an official trip to India in August 2007 and met a number of senior Indian defense and intelligence chiefs including Chaturvedi. However, Chaturvedi did not know who Keating was, and kept referring to him as John Negroponte, the U.S. deputy Secretary of State. In another episode, before leaving on a trip to China in January, Indian Prime Minister Manmohan Singh asked Chaturvedi for a briefing about his perspectives of the current senior leadership in China. Instead of delegating the task to the China section within R&AW, Chaturvedi attempted to put together his own report which talked about Jiang Zemin and Zhu Rongji, the former president and premier respectively, both of whom retired in 2003.

== Government Sanctions Dismissal ==
Because of the repeated instances of incompetence and scandals during Chaturvedi's tenure and the continuing decline of the intelligence agency, it had been reported by the Indian and foreign press that the R&AW chief would be removed from his post, which has never happened before.

It was reported that several Western intelligence agencies were reluctant to share classified information with R&AW's top officials, because of Chaturvedi. Prime Minister Manmohan Singh and other senior officials of his secretariat were unhappy with him as a result.

The Middle East Times revealed that at a closed-door meeting at the start of 2008 which all of India's intelligence and military chiefs were present, Chaturvedi was asked for his opinion on the upcoming security challenges the country faced. The R&AW chief presented his views while chewing tobacco and sounding incoherent. Narayanan asked him to clean out his mouth. But "Embarrassment turned to humiliation when Chaturvedi resumed his analysis only to be told by Narayanan that he was making more sense when the tobacco was in his mouth."

The pressure to sack him on the grounds of gross incompetence had reached Prime Minister Manmohan Singh, who supported by senior leaders in the ruling Congress Party, gave his approval to quietly remove Chaturvedi.

Chaturvedi made a direct personal appeal to Congress Party President Sonia Gandhi to save his job, claiming that he was not in good health and that he should be allowed to serve out the remainder of his service period. Gandhi, passed the responsibility for the decision to Narayanan with her recommendation for a review. Narayanan deferred making any decision thus reprieving Chaturvedi. G.S. Bajpai, a former head of R&AW and Tripathi's father-in law, also intervened and pleaded the case to keep Chaturvedi when it looked like he would be sacked. Quoting sources from the Prime Minister's Office, the Middle East Times claimed that "The Congress Party was worried that if Chaturvedi was sacked it would be a sign of admitting that they had made a mistake."

Criticism has focused on Narayanan himself, who despite being a respected figure within India for his record with the domestic spy agency, the Intelligence Bureau (IB), he has had to take criticism for sanctioning Chaturvedi's appointment and continuing in persisting with him.

== Unsanctioned Post-Retirement Perks ==
In the 8 February 2010 edition of Outlook Magazine it was reported that following his retirement, Chaturvedi had a diplomatic passport issued for himself and his wife and was able to utilize Government of India funds for their personal international trips. According to Outlook Magazine, "Only grade ‘A’ ambassadors—usually IFS (Indian Foreign Service) officers posted in key countries like the UK and US—are allowed to hold diplomatic passports after retirement. The majority, who do not fit that bill, hold passports issued to ordinary citizens. In fact, all former R&AW chiefs Outlook spoke to confirmed they had surrendered their diplomatic passports the day they retired. And their spouses weren’t entitled to diplomatic passports even while they were in service."

Preceded by P.K.H. Tharakan	Director of R&AW; 1 February 2007 – 31 January 2009	Succeeded by K. C. Verma
