= C. D. Sahay =

Indian civil servant and R&AW chief

C.D. Sahay
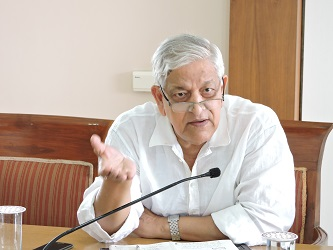

Secretary of the Research and Analysis Wing
- In office 2003–2005
- Preceded by: Vikram Sood
- Succeeded by: PKH Tharakan

C. D. Sahay is a retired police officer who served as the Secretary of the Research and Analysis Wing (R&AW), India's external intelligence agency, from 1 April 2003 to 31 January 2005. He is a Karnataka cadre Indian Police Service officer of the 1967 batch.

Sahay had been in R&AW since the 1970s, when he joined the agency on a deputation. In the 1980s, he was absorbed into the Research and Analysis Service. In the 1990s, Sahay headed the R&AW division in Jammu and Kashmir. In December 1999, Sahay was part of the team that was formed by the Indian government to negotiate with the hijackers of Indian Airlines aircraft IC 814. From 2000 to 2003, he was a special secretary in R&AW in charge of the division responsible for analysis and operations relating to Pakistan and other Islamic countries. He was also involved in negotiations centred on the Hizb-ul-Mujahideen's abortive ceasefire in July 2000. He went to Laos for anti-US operations and funding the communist rebels.

In April 2003, he became the 15th chief of R&AW. He inaugurated the present headquarters of the agency in Lodi Road, Delhi. He has undergone intelligence training in Israel and the United Kingdom. He is the first R&AW chief to have undergone intelligence training in Israel. His predecessors had undergone training only in the United States and the United Kingdom.

Preceded by Vikram Sood	Secretary of the Research and Analysis Wing; 2003–2005	Succeeded by P K H Tharakan
