= Alok Joshi =

Indian spymaster and head of National Security Council of India

Alok Joshi IPS (Retd.)

Secretary of the Research and Analysis Wing
- In office 30 December 2012 – 31 December 2014
- Preceded by: Sanjeev Tripathi
- Succeeded by: Rajinder Khanna

Personal details
- Education: Jawaharlal Nehru University

Alok Joshi is an Indian spymaster and retired IPS officer of 1976 batch of Haryana cadre who previously served as the chief of Research and Analysis Wing, the external intelligence agency of India. He is currently appointed as the head of National Security Council of India.

Hailing from Lucknow, he graduated from Jawaharlal Nehru University, (JNU), completed his postgraduation in political science and then joined the Indian Police Service (IPS), Haryana cadre in 1976. He rose through his ranks and later in 2005 became the joint director of Intelligence Bureau, the internal intelligence agency of India.

In 2010 he was appointed as a Special Secretary at R&AW. He took over as secretary R&AW on 30 December 2012. Joshi and Amitabh Mathur of 1977 batch of Manipur and Tripura, IPS cadre were the main contendants for the top spot. Mathur had joined R&AW in 1981 and switched from IPS to RAS cadre. However the Prime Minister-headed Appointments Committee of the Cabinet (India) chose Joshi over Mathur because of his seniority.

| Preceded by Sanjeev Tripathi | Secretary, R&AW; 30 December 2012 – 31 December 2014 | Succeeded by Rajinder Khanna |
