= K. C. Verma =

Indian police officer and spymaster

Krishan Chander Verma

Secretary of the Research and Analysis Wing
- In office 31 January 2009 – 30 December 2010
- Preceded by: Ashok Chaturvedi
- Succeeded by: Sanjeev Tripathi

Krishan Chander Verma (born 30 March 1949) was the Director of Research and Analysis Wing (R&AW), the external intelligence agency of India, his official designation was Secretary (R). He did his schooling from Mayo College, Ajmer. He belongs to the 1971 Jharkhand IPS cadre. He started his career at the Intelligence Bureau, was appointed as head of the Narcotics Control Bureau in 2005, and was later elevated to the position of Secretary (Security) and also served as Internal Security Adviser to Home Minister. He was laterally transferred to head R&AW after Ashok Chaturvedi retired from the post on 31 January 2009. One of the major challenges for K. C. Verma had been professionalise and streamline the agency, which had been in news in recent times for various scandals and controversies.

Verma was scheduled to superannuate on 31 January 2011, whereas his second-in-command, Sanjeev Tripathi was due to retire on 31 December 2010. Verma had relinquished charge of Secretary (R) on 30 December 2010 on voluntary retirement, to allow Tripathi to take over, under an informal government promise to post him as Chairman, NTRO, because of Tripathi's influential lobby (his father-in-law being Gauri Shankar Bajpai, former R&AW chief); but the government did not post Verma to NTRO. Subsequently, P. Vijay Kumar was made NTRO chief.

Preceded by Ashok Chaturvedi	Secretary, R&AW; 1 February 2009 – 30 December 2010	Succeeded by Sanjeev Tripathi
