= Ravi Sinha =

Indian intelligence officer (born 1964)

Secretary of the Research and Analysis Wing
- In office 1 July 2023 – 30 June 2025
- Preceded by: Samant Goel
- Succeeded by: Parag Jain

Personal details
- Born: 14 January 1964 (age 62) Bhojpur, Bihar
- Education: St. Stephen's College, Delhi; Delhi University
- Profession: Retired IPS officer

Ravi Sinha (born 14 January 1964) is a retired Indian bureaucrat, spymaster and an IPS officer of the 1988 batch who served as the Secretary of the Research and Analysis Wing (R&AW) of India.

== Early life and career ==
Sinha was born on 14 January 1964 in the city of Arrah, located in Bhojpur district in the state of Bihar. His father was a professor in Dhanbad and the family used to travel between the two towns regularly. The family relocated to the city permanently after his father retired. Sinha graduated from St. Stephen's College, Delhi. He joined the Indian Police Service (IPS) in the 1988 batch and was assigned to the Madhya Pradesh cadre. In 2000, he was reassigned to Chhattisgarh, the new state was split off from Madhya Pradesh. Sinha served as the Superintendent of Police of Durg and also at the state capital Raipur. He then chose to transfer to police intelligence, and was deputed to the Research & Analysis Wing (R&AW).

Sinha was promoted to the office of Secretary, R&AW on 1 July 2023. He was previously the chief of the R&AW operations wing for seven years. Sinha has significant experience in Kashmir, Northeast India and areas affected by the Naxalite insurgency. Sinha was set to retire in January 2024 but received an extension. According to a report by NDTV, Sinha has operated in Kashmir, Ladakh and Punjab, and also served as a consular general in Hong Kong for four years. Sinha is also said to have served in Bhutan, China and The Hague. He is considered an expert on Pakistan, Myanmar and the Khalistan movement

Sinha retired as Secretary, R&AW on 30 June 2025. His tenure saw the 2024 Bengaluru cafe bombing, and the emergence of The Resistance Front (TRF) in Kashmir as an arm of the Lashkar-e-Taiba. A report in The Sunday Guardian claimed Sinha tackled terrorism in mainland India and also reduced the TRF threat. The report also noted how 30 terrorists were killed in Pakistan from 2023 to 2025, overlapping with Singh's tenure. Many terrorists disappeared from public life and lambasted the Pakistani intelligence agency ISI (Inter-Services Intelligence) for not protecting them. The report also lauded Indian activities in South Asia and elsewhere during Sinha's time in office. After retiring from R&AW, Sinha was appointed a Special Secretary in the Cabinet Secretariat.

During the 2025 India–Pakistan conflict, led by Sinha, R&AW and the National Technical Research Organisation prepared a list of 21 militant bases in Pakistan. Out of these 25, nine high-priority bases were selected and bombed on 7 May.
