= Dhasmana =

Dhasmana is an Indian surname. Notable people with the surname include

- Anil Dhasmana (born 1957), retired Indian Police Service officer and former chief of the Research and Analysis Wing and the National Technical Research Organisation
- Suryakant Dhasmana (born 1964), Indian politician and Vice President of Uttarakhand Pradesh Congress Committee
