= Shen Zui =

Chinese lieutenant general (1914–1996)

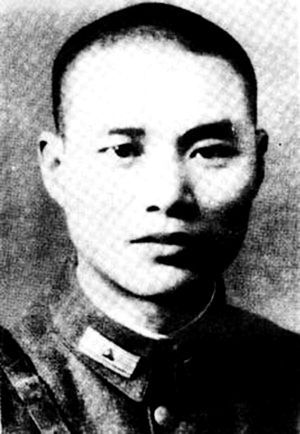
- Born: 3 June 1914; Xiangtan, Hunan, China
- Died: 18 March 1996 (aged 81) Beijing, People's Republic of China
- Allegiance: Republic of China
- Branch: (Republic of China (1912–1949)) National Revolutionary Army; Military Statistics Bureau
- Service years: 1932–1949
- Rank: Lieutenant General
- Commands: General Affairs Department, MBIS; Inspection Department, Changde Garrison Command; Operations Team, MBIS Shanghai Station
- Conflicts: Second Sino-Japanese War; Chinese Civil War

Shen Zui (沈醉; 3 June 1914 – 18 March 1996) was a Chinese Kuomintang general and spymaster in the Bureau of Investigation and Statistics who had a prominent role in the Chinese Civil War fighting against the Communists. He was detained by Lu Han who defected to the Communists in 1949 and spent 12 years in prison, before receiving an amnesty along with other ex-Kuomintang generals like Du Yuming, Song Xilian, Wang Yaowu and Chen Changjie. After his release, he authored many memoirs and history books, one of which was translated into English with the title A KMT War Criminal in New China. He died in 1996 in Beijing, China.
