= Sanjeev Tripathi =

Indian spymaster

Secretary of the Research and Analysis Wing
- In office 30 December 2010 – 29 December 2012
- Preceded by: K. C. Verma
- Succeeded by: Alok Joshi

Personal details
- Party: Bharatiya Janata Party

Sanjeev Tripathi is member of the BJP and former Secretary of the Research and Analysis Wing. Tripathi is the son-in-law of Former R&AW secretary, G.S. Bajpai, and comes from a family of Bareilly, Uttar Pradesh. A keen sportsman, he topped the civil service exam in 1972, and joined the Uttar Pradesh cadre. Few years later, he switched to RAW, resigning from the IPS, and was absorbed in the Research & Analysis Service (RAS), which feeds the ranks of RAW. Mr Vikram Sood is the first RAS cadre officer to be appointed as Secretary (R) in its more than four-decade history. Mr. Tripathi is the Second officer to be appointed as Secretary (R) from the RAS (RAW Allied Services) cadre .

== Biography ==
Tripathi played a significant role in tracking down Sikh separatists operating abroad and get them to India to participate in talks with the Indian government. He also served on several key desks, including the Pakistan desk, and also headed agency’s most sensitive special operations division, as special secretary. Earlier, he helped arrive at a peace accord with insurgents in the northeastern states. He also served as commissioner at R&AW’s Calcutta based Special Bureau, which looks at Bangladesh.

Mr. Tripathi, who has extensive experience in intelligence, has his task cut out. As the ARC chief he managed to ensure that the secretive Tibetan force, Special Frontier Force (SFF), gets pension and retirement benefits. The force has not had these benefits since its creation after the 1962 war with China.

Tripathi has been asked by the NSA, Shiv Shankar Menon, to prepare a comprehensive report on personnel policies by 15 January to ensure that the longlasting disputes between RAS and non-RAS cadre officers are resolved. R&AW has also been facing recrutment shortages; morale was reported to be low. So Tripathi will have to focus on addressing these disputes and to consider India’s regional security environment. Ten years ago, a Group of Ministers, aided by a special task force on intelligence, had undertaken efforts to reform India’s intelligence community, which faced criticism and concerns relating to infrastructure, resources and parliamentary oversight. The two new chiefs were expected to continue the reform efforts.

He joined the Bhartiya Janata Party ahead of the Lok Sabha election in 2014.
