= Indian Police Service Limited Competitive Examination =

To face the shortage of Indian Police Service officers in India as a result the high attrition in the Indian Police Service, the Ministry of Home Affairs proposed the formation of Indian Police Service Limited Competitive Examination to be conducted by UPSC. IPS Limited Competitive Examination was held for the first time in 2012. This is in addition to the Civil Services Examination conducted by UPSC itself, for recruitment to the various civil services including Indian Police Service.The Central Administrative Tribunal (CAT) has struck down the examination following the challenge by some state cadre police officers. Consequent to the CAT verdict, UPSC has withheld the declaration of final results of 2012 examination. Now, the Ministry of Home Affairs is trying to sort out the legal matters as soon as possible.

== Eligibility Conditions ==
(a)The candidate must hold a degree of any of Universities incorporated by an Act of the Central or State Legislature in India or other educational institutions established by an Act of Parliament or declared to be deemed as a University Under Section-3 of the University Grants Commission Act, 1956, or possess an equivalent qualification.

(b) A candidate must not have attained the age of 32 years for General Category, 35 years for Other Backward Classes category candidates and 37 years for candidates belonging to a Scheduled Caste or Scheduled Tribe.

Part B - Main Examination - Optional

Paper-I One of the Indian Languages to be selected by the candidate from the 22 languages included in the VIIIth Schedule to the Constitution (Qualifying Paper) am during the job

300 Marks

Paper-II English (Qualifying Paper) 300 Marks

Paper-III Essay [in the medium you choose]

Papers

Papers VI, VII, VIII & IX X Any two subjects (each having 2 papers) to be selected from the prescribed optional subjects (300 marks for each paper) 1200 Mark

== Scheme of Examination ==
The Examination will comprise two components viz. Written Examination and Interview for Personality Test.

Note 3: The objective from papers will be qualifying in nature.

== Brief Syllabus ==
Paper I:- General Studies covering Current affairs, History of India, Geography of India and the world, Indian polity and Governance, Economic and social development, Environmental issues, General Science get paper II :- Aptitude test comprising Comprehension, Interpersonal skills, Logical reasoning and analytical ability, Decision making and problem-solving, General mental ability, Basic numeracy, and English Language Comprehension skills

Paper III :- English Language paper. This paper would be of Matriculation standard and qualifying in nature only. Its marks will not be counted for the preparation of merit ranking.

Paper IV :- Essay paper. It will comprise two essays, one on the security aspect and the other on the various developmental aspects of the society.

Paper V:- General Studies paper covering various aspects like Elementary Principles of Public Law, State Policy, Fundamental Rights, Human Rights, Disaster Management, National Security, etc.

Part B PAPERS OF DESCRIPTIVE TYPE

Paper III : English (200 marks / 3 hours duration):- This will be a qualifying test only of Matriculation or equivalent standard. The aim of the paper is to test the candidate's ability to read and understand serious discursive prose, and to express his ideas clearly and correctly, in English. The pattern of questions would be broad as follows (indicative only) :—

1. Comprehension of given passages;
2. Precise Writing;

UPSC Prelims Syllabus Syllabus for GS Paper (Prelims Paper I) Current events of national and international importance. History of India and Indian National Movement. Indian and World Geography-Physical, Social, Economic Geography of India and the World. Indian Polity and Governance – Constitution, Political System, Panchayati Raj, Public Policy, Rights Issues, etc. Economic and Social Development – Sustainable Development, Poverty, Inclusion, Demographics, Social Sector initiatives, etc. General issues on Environmental Ecology, Biodiversity and Climate Change – that do not require subject specialisation. General Science Syllabus for CSAT Paper (Prelims Paper-II) Comprehension Interpersonal skills including communication skills Logical reasoning and analytical ability Decision-making and problem solving General mental ability Basic numeracy (numbers and their relations, orders of magnitude, etc.) (Class X level), Data interpretation (charts, graphs, tables, data sufficiency etc. – Class X level)

1. Usage and Vocabulary;
2. Paragraphs writing;

Note I : Answer all questions in this paper will have to be attempted in English only.

Paper IV: Essay ( 200 Marks/ 3 hours duration) Candidates will be required to write two Essays. One topic will pertain to Indian Society/ politics/ Economy/Development, Growth, and related aspects. The other topic will pertain to security and related matters. Candidates will be expected to keep close to the subject of the essay to arrange their ideas in an orderly fashion and to write concisely. Credit will be given for effective and exact expression.

Paper V: General Studies (200 Marks/ 3 hours duration) The questions will be such as to test a candidate's awareness of a variety of subjects and are likely to test the candidate's basic understanding of all relevant issues, and the ability to analyze and take a view on conflicting socio-economic goals, objectives and demands. The candidates must give relevant, meaningful and succinct answers. Note: This paper can be answered by the Candidates either in English or in Hindi. Attempting answers in any other language or use of ‘mixed’ language (i.e. partly in English and partly in Hindi) is not permissible. Syllabus: a) A brief idea about the History and Geography of India.

b) Constitution of India and Indian Polity: This part will include questions on the Constitution of India, as well as all constitutional, legal, administrative and other issues emerging from the politico-administrative system prevalent in the country.

c) Current National Issues and Topics of Social Relevance -

This part is intended to test the Candidate's awareness of current national issues and topics of social relevance in present-day India, such as the following :

1. The Indian economy and issues relating to planning, mobilization of resources, growth, development and employment.
2. Issues arising from the social and economic exclusion of large sections from the benefits of development.
3. Other issues relating to the development and management of human resources.
4. Health issues including the management of Public Health, Health education, and ethical concerns regarding health-care.
5. Law enforcement and related issues such as the preservation of communal harmony.
6. Issues relating to good governance and accountability to the citizens including the maintenance of human rights, and of probity in public life.
7. Environmental issues, ecological preservation, conservation of natural resources, and national heritage.
8. India's diversity, unity amidst diversity and pluralism as a part of the functioning of Indian Society. Conflicts due to political, economic, social and cultural reasons. Conflict resolution.
9. Democratic rights and privileges of citizens. Emerging social changes/trends relevant to governance.
10. National Security: Structure and functions of Defense Forces, Para Military Forces, and Police. Origin, growth, and dimensions of fundamentalism, militancy and terrorism. Local, regional, national and international dimensions of organized crime and terrorism; and efforts at countering them. "White-collar" and cybercrime, money laundering and tax-havens. Technology in crime detection, prevention, and investigation, including forensics. Weapons and weapons training that a uniformed officer should be aware of. Food security, energy security, water security, technological self-reliance as a part of security objectives, Disaster Management including natural and man-made disasters.
11. Statistical Analysis, graph, and diagrams: This part will test the candidate's ability to draw conclusions from information presented in statistical, graphical or diagrammatically form and to interpret them.

== See also ==
- Indian Administrative Service (IAS)
- Union Public Service Commission (UPSC)
- List of Public service commissions in India
