= Nina Singh =

Indian Police service officer

- Born: 11 July 1964 (age 62); Patna, Bihar
- Education: Patna Women's College; JNU; Harvard University
- Occupation: Indian Police Service
- Years active: 1989–2024
- Organization: Central Industrial Security Force
- Spouse: Rohit Kumar Singh
- Honours: Ati Utkrisht Seva Medal (2020); President's Police Medal (2005)
- Website: https://www.cisf.gov.in/

Nina Singh (born 11 July 1964) is a retired Indian Police Service officer of 1989 batch of Rajasthan cadre. She was the first female Director General of the Central Industrial Security Force. She was previously DG of Rajasthan and Special Director General of Central Industrial Security Force, and additional Director General of CISF in National Board of Economic Research.

== Early life and education ==
Singh is from Bihar and attended Patna Women's College and Jawaharlal Nehru University. She has a master's in public administration from Harvard University.

== Career ==
Singh's first posting as Additional Superintendent of police (ASP) was in Jaipur in 1992 and she was then SP of Alwar. As Joint Director (2005-2013) of the Central Bureau of Investigation, she received the President's distinguished service medal in 2005. She was Director General of police in Rajasthan Police, the first woman to hold the position, working in civil rights, anti-human trafficking, and training.

In 2000, Singh was secretary for the State Women's Commission and designed an outreach program which holding hearings for women in distress. She has co-authored two research papers with Abhijit Banerjee and Esther Duflo.

Singh has been part of the Central Industrial Security Force (CISF) since 2021. In December 2023, she was appointed Director General, the first woman to hold the position and served there till her superannuation 31 July 2024.

== Personal life ==
Singh is married to Rohit Kumar Singh, who is retired IAS officer.
