= Hormis Tharakan =

Indian bureaucrat and intelligence officer

P. K. Hormis Tharakan

Secretary of the Research and Analysis Wing
- In office 1 February 2005 – 31 January 2007
- Preceded by: C. D. Sahay
- Succeeded by: Ashok Chaturvedi

Personal details
- Born: 31 January 1947 (age 79) Kerala, India

Military service
- Allegiance: India

P. K. Hormis Tharakan is a retired Indian Police Service (IPS) officer of the Kerala cadre (1968 batch) who served as the Secretary of the Research and Analysis Wing (R&AW), India's external intelligence agency, from 1 February 2005 to 31 January 2007. He is the former Director General of the Kerala Police.

Tharakan succeeded C. D. Sahay, a 1967 batch officer of the IPS' Karnataka cadre on 31 January 2005 to take over as the Secretary of R&AW. After his retirement from R&AW in 2007, Tharakan moved to Bangalore, Karnataka.

He was one of the advisors to the Governor of Karnataka, when the state was brought under the President's rule prior to Assembly elections in the state in 2008. He was a member of the National Security Council and was also the Chief Advisor of Strategic Affairs.

In 2014, he moved to Olavaip, his ancestral village in Kerala. Tharakan and his family are from Olavip. In 2016, Tharakan began to experiment with paddy-shrimp farming in Olavaip and by 2019, he was a full time paddy-shrimp farmer.

Preceded by C D Sahay	Secretary of the Research and Analysis Wing; 1 February 2005 – 31 January 2007	Succeeded by Ashok Chaturvedi
