= Anil Dhasmana =

Former Secretary of Research & Analysis Wing

Anil Dhasmana IPS (Retd.)

Secretary of the Research and Analysis Wing
- In office 31 January 2017 – 29 June 2019
- Preceded by: Rajinder Khanna
- Succeeded by: Samant Goel

Personal details
- Born: 2 October 1957 (age 69) Pauri, Uttarakhand, India

Anil Dhasmana is a retired Indian Police Service officer and a former spymaster who served as the Chief of National Technical Research Organisation (NTRO). He was also the Secretary of the Research and Analysis Wing (R&AW), India's foreign intelligence service.

== Biography ==
Dhasmana was born on 2 October 1957 in Pauri, Uttarakhand and holds an M.Com. degree from Uttar Pradesh. He is 1981-batch Madhya Pradesh cadre IPS officer and was appointed on 3 December 1981. His domain of expertise is considered to be Balochistan, counter-terrorism and Islamic affairs. He also has a vast experience on Pakistan and Afghanistan.

He served as Chief of Station in London and Frankfurt and Chief of Station, SAARC & Europe desks. Before being appointed as the secretary, he was posted from 13 March 2015 as a Special Secretary.

Preceded by Rajinder Khanna	Secretary, R&AW; 31 January 2017 – present	Succeeded by Samant Goel
