= Manoj Yadava =

Indian Police Service officer

Manoj Yadav
- Born: 30 July 1965 (age 61); Aligarh, Uttar Pradesh, India
- Children: 2(sons)
- Police career
- Country: India
- Department: IPS
- Status: DGP & Chief of RPF
- Rank: DGP RPF (July 2023-July 2025); DGP NHRC (July 2022-June 2023); SDG IB (August 2021-July 2022); DGP Haryana Police (February 2019- August 2021)
- Badge no.: 19881003
- Batch: 1988
- Cadre: Haryana
- Awards: President's Police Medal for Distinguished Service; Police Medal for Meritorious Service; United Nation Peace Keeping Medal; United Nation Foreign Service Medal (Kosovo)

Manoj Yadav (born 30 July 1965) is a retired Indian Police Service (IPS) officer who served as Director General of Railway Protection Force and former Director General of Police of Haryana Police. He had previously held the post of joint Director of the Intelligence Bureau at the Union Home Ministry (MHA).

== Early life ==
Yadav was born in Aligarh, Uttar Pradesh, India.

His elder son, Aditya Vikram Yadav, IAS, has secured the rank 72 in UPSC 2018 and is currently serving as the District Magistrate (DM) of Sivasagar district in Assam. His younger son, Aniruddh Yadav, is also an IAS officer. Aniruddh secured the All-India Rank (AIR) 08 in the UPSC Civil Services Exam-2022 result.

== Career ==
Yadav was appointed to the IPS in 1988. He has worked as SP in many districts of Haryana.

He joined the Intelligence Bureau in February 2003. On 18 February 2019, he was appointed as Director General of Police, Haryana. On 7 January 2021, the Haryana government extended his tenure till further orders.

He was replaced by the incumbent Prashanta Kumar Agrawal, an IPS officer of the 1988 batch, on 16 August 2021. Yadav was appointed in 2023 as the Director General of Police or head of the Railway Protection Force, where he served until 2025.

== See also ==
- Director general of police
