= List of fictional spymasters =

This is a list of fictional spymasters, deputy directors, directors general, and executive directors of Intelligence agencies.

== Books ==
- Maxim Isaev, a Soviet spy operating in Nazi Germany under the name Max Otto von Stierlitz, tasked with disrupting the secret negotiations aimed at forging a separate peace between Germany and the Western Allies and bringing Nazi personnel under the US aegis. Introduced in the "Isaev – Stierlitz" series of novels by Yulian Semyonov.
- Control (Britain), George Smiley (Britain) and Karla (Soviet Union) in John le Carré novels.
- M, the head of MI6 in Ian Fleming's James Bond series.
- Lord Varys, known as "The Spider", is the Master of Whisperers of the King's Small Council in the fictional Seven Kingdoms of Westeros, from George R.R. Martin's A Song of Ice and Fire series of novels.
  - Qyburn, who holds the same position after Varys flees following the conclusion of A Storm of Swords.
  - Brynden Rivers, known as "Bloodraven", who held the position, as well as that of Hand of the King, in the prequel series Tales of Dunk and Egg.
- Simon Illyan, head of ImpSec (Barrayaran Imperial Security) in the Vorkosigan Saga series.
- X2, head of the secret service in Ibn-e-Safi's Imran Series novels. X2 is strict leader whose identity remains hidden from his team members and he makes contact with them on telephone or transmitter and at the same time he does all the field work along with his teammates being Ali Imran, a charming young man who looks like a moron and idiot by face. Due to his perfection in maintaining this dual personality, neither from his teammates, nor from his enemies could conclude that this Idiot Ali Imran could be the chief of secret service whose voice on a phone call could make his subordinate nervous.
- Airen Cracken is the first director of New Republic Intelligence (NRI) within the Star Wars Legends continuity.
  - Garik "Face" Loran, previously one of the lead characters in the X-wing series, was the last known director of Galactic Alliance Intelligence, the NRI's successor.
- Ysanne Isard (Iceheart) was a prominent director of Imperial Intelligence and the main antagonist in the first half of the X-wing series. Throughout her time in the series, she commanded a series of brainwashed sleeper agents with the New Republic's armed forces.

== Comics ==
DC Comics

- Amanda Waller
- King Faraday
- Maxwell Lord
- Mister Bones
- Kathy Kane
- Otto Netz
- Father Time

Marvel Comics

- Colonel Rick Stoner – First known S.H.I.E.L.D executive director. He was assassinated by the terrorist group Hydra.
- Colonel Nick Fury – A leading agent of the fictional espionage agency S.H.I.E.L.D.
- Timothy "Dum Dum" Dugan – Third known S.H.I.E.L.D executive director. Former Corporal of Fury's World War II squad.
- G. W. Bridge – Fourth known S.H.I.E.L.D executive director.
- Sharon Carter (Agent 13) – Fifth known S.H.I.E.L.D executive director. Often detailed as liaison officer to Captain America.
- Maria Hill – Sixth known executive director. Level 9 Agent.
- Tony Stark (Iron Man) – Seventh known S.H.I.E.L.D executive director. Takes up position after the Civil War.
- Norman Osborn – Eighth known S.H.I.E.L.D executive director. Takes up position after Secret Invasion. He dismantles S.H.I.E.L.D. and renames it H.A.M.M.E.R.
- Steve Rogers (Captain America) – Ninth known S.H.I.E.L.D executive director.

== Anime and manga ==
- Jiraiya (Naruto), the spymaster for the Village Hidden in the Leaves.
- Lieutenant Colonel Yuuki (Joker Game), A lieutenant colonel to the Imperial Japanese Army, and also a spymaster. He is the founder of D-Agency. He once worked as a spy and given the nickname "Demon Lord"

== Film ==
- M, the head of MI6 in Ian Fleming's James Bond franchise.

== Television ==
- Arvin Sloane, a character in the American TV series Alias
- Harry Pearce, head of MI5's Counter-Terrorism department in Spooks
- William Walden and David Estes, the former/deceased Director of the CIA and Director of the Counter-terrorism Center, respectively, during seasons 1–2 of Homeland (TV series); throughout seasons 3, Saul Berenson was the acting-Director of the CIA.
- Phillip "Phil" Coulson, after announcing his plan to go undercover for a while, General Fury hands Coulson the 'toolbox', a small cube containing coordinates and a few other things, and appoints Coulson acting executive director of S.H.I.E.L.D., with a mandate to rebuild the organization from the ground up.
- Malory Archer was the head of the International Secret Intelligence Service (ISIS) in the television series Archer.
- Ahsoka Tano, the former Jedi Padawan of Anakin Skywalker and spymaster for the early rebellion against the Galactic Empire under the codename Fulcrum in Star Wars Rebels.
- Luthen Rael, the enigmatic Axis as dubbed by the Imperial Security Bureau in the Star Wars television series Andor, he lives a double life as an antiques dealer while using extreme methods to unite the rebel cells into a single, formal alliance against the Galactic Empire.

== Video games ==
- Hiram Burrows is the Empire Spymaster in the game Dishonored, who later becomes the first Lord Regent, the main antagonist in the game.
  - Protagonist Corvo Attano becomes the Spymaster after Burrows is executed.
- Jason Hudson, from the Call of Duty: Black Ops series.
- Caius Cosades is the Imperial Grand-Spymaster of the Blades (who are an order of the Emperor's secret agents and protectors) in Morrowind, who acts as a guide, mentor and supervisor of the player character.
- Sam Fisher, in Tom Clancy's Splinter Cell: Blacklist.
- Jurah (The Master of Whispers) is a spymaster for the Order of Whispers in Guild Wars.
- Daniel Carrington, head of the Carrington Institute in the Perfect Dark series
- Leliana is the spymaster for the Inquisition in Dragon Age: Inquisition.
- Deacon is the spymaster for the Armada in Pirate101.
- Janus is the former spymaster of the KGB in Hitman 2.

== Parodies of spy masters ==
- Basil Exposition, Austin Powers film series

== See also ==
- List of S.H.I.E.L.D. members
- List of Real Spymasters
