= Secretary of the Research and Analysis Wing =

Seniormost official of the Research & Analysis Wing

Secretary, Research and Analysis Wing of India
- सचिव, अनुसंधान एवं विश्लेषण विंग
- Emblem of India

- Flag of India

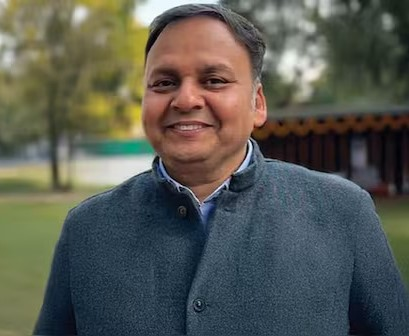
- Incumbent; Parag Jain, IPS since 1st July, 2025
- Cabinet Secretariat; Research & Analysis Wing
- Status: Head of R&AW
- Member of: Strategic Policy Group; National Security Council
- Reports to: Prime Minister; National Security Advisor; External Affairs Minister; Cabinet Secretary
- Residence: Classified
- Seat: Seva Teerth-2, Cabinet Secretariat, New Delhi
- Appointer: Appointments Committee of the Cabinet
- Term length: Typically 2 years, can be extended
- Inaugural holder: R. N. Kao
- Formation: 1968
- Succession: 23rd (on the Indian order of precedence)
- Salary: ₹225,000 (US$2,300) monthly
- Website: Classified

The Secretary (Research) serves as the head of the Research and Analysis Wing (R&AW), India's foreign intelligence agency. Typically held by a senior officer from the Indian Police Service (IPS), the secretary reports directly to the Prime Minister of India and is responsible for all intelligence operations abroad.

The first secretary was R. N. Kao, who established the agency in 1968. As the head of R&AW, the secretary is responsible for intelligence collection, covert operations, and national security assessments.

== History ==
The position of secretary (Research) was established in 1968, at the inception of the agency under the Indira Gandhi-led government. At that time, the Secretary (Research) was placed on par with other senior secretarial positions, such as the Home Secretary and the Foreign Secretary. In 1977, the Morarji Desai-led government downgraded the post and redesignated it as the Director of R&AW. This change was reversed in 1986 by the Rajiv Gandhi-led government, reinstating the original designation of Secretary (Research).

The Secretary (Research) is appointed by the Prime Minister of India in consultation with the Appointments Committee of the Cabinet for an initial term of two years, with the possibility of extension if the officeholder's service is deemed fit for continuation. The longest-serving Secretary was R. N. Kao, who led the agency from its inception in 1968 until his retirement in 1977. Although R&AW has its own specialised cadre, the Research and Analysis Service (RAS), most of the organization's chiefs have traditionally been drawn from the Indian Police Service (IPS), a practice that has occasionally faced criticism. To date, only N. F. Suntook and Vikram Sood have served as R&AW chiefs without coming from the IPS cadre.

== Powers and responsibilities ==
The Secretary of R&AW heads the entire organisation and oversees its operations, administration, and coordination with other security and intelligence agencies. The role includes:

- Advising the Prime Minister of India on all matters of foreign intelligence and national security.
- Planning and supervising intelligence gathering abroad.
- Overseeing covert operations and counter-intelligence activities outside India.
- Coordinating with other Indian intelligence agencies, such as Intelligence Bureau (IB) and National Technical Research Organisation (NTRO).
- Reporting directly to the Prime Minister and the Cabinet Committee on Security.
- Appointing senior officers within R&AW in consultation with the Appointments Committee of the Cabinet (ACC).
- Functions as an arm of the Cabinet Secretariat with the Secretary (Research) positioned within the Secretariat.
- Works under the Cabinet Secretary while cooperating with the National Security Advisor to report-cum-advise the Prime Minister on intelligence matters.
- Exercises sweeping powers over R&AW's functioning, except administrative and financial matters, which remain under the remit of the Cabinet Secretary.
- Serves as a member of the Strategic Policy Group under the National Security Council, tasked with advising policymakers on long-term strategic reviews and national security decision-making.

== Emolument, accommodation and perquisites ==
The Secretary of R&AW holds the rank of Secretary to the Government of India. The post is accompanied by:

- Official residence.
- Security cover as per central government rules.
- Eligibility for a diplomatic or official passport for foreign travel.
- Salary as per Pay Level 17 of the 7th Pay Commission.

Secretary, R&AW monthly pay and allowances
Base Salary (Per month)	Pay Matrix Level
₹225,000 (US$2,300)	Pay Level 17

== List of Secretaries of R&AW ==
Secretary (Research)
No.	Name	Cadre	Took office	Left office	Notes
1	R. N. Kao	Imperial Police (IP)	1968	1977	• Founder of R&AW and ARC and first Secretary (R). • Led intelligence efforts during the 1971 India-Pakistan conflict. • Participated in Operation Smiling Buddha and the 1975 annexation of Sikkim.
Director, R&AW
2	K. Sankaran Nair	Imperial Police (IP)	1977	1977	• Assisted in the establishment of Ghana's FSRB with R. N. Kao. • Organized intelligence operations during 1971 India-Pakistan conflict prior to appointment. • Resigned in protest after degradation of Secretary (R) to Director, R&AW.
3	N. F. Suntook	Indian Frontier Administrative Service (IFAS)	1977	1983	Founder Director of RRC (Radio Research Centre), ETS • Executed Operation Lal Dora
4	Girish Chandra Saxena	Indian Police Service (IPS)	1983	1986	• Collaborated with the Intelligence Agencies of United States, the erstwhile USSR, China, Iran, Afghanistan, Saudi Arabia, etc. • Kanishka Bombing • Operation Blue Star
Secretary (Research)
5	S. E. Joshi	Indian Police Service (IPS)	1986	1987	• Continued collaboration with Intelligence Agencies • During his tenure, the post of Director of R&AW was re-designated as Secretary (R), and this designation has continued since then.
6	A. K. Verma	Indian Police Service (IPS)	1987	1990	• Operation Cactus • Indian Peace Keeping Force
7	G. S. Bajpai	Indian Police Service (IPS)	1990	1991	Counter Insurgency operations
8	N. Narasimhan	Indian Police Service (IPS)	1991	1993	
9	J. S. Bedi	Indian Police Service (IPS)	1993	1993	• Shortest serving Secretary (R) with a tenure of only four months; was not given extension.
10	A. S. Syali	Indian Police Service (IPS)	1993	1996	• Led intelligence collection efforts in Tibet during initial years of his career; not much other information known.
11	Ranjan Roy	Indian Police Service (IPS)	1996	1997	• Transferred from IB to R&AW. • Tenure marked by emphasis on Pakistan and Afghanistan affairs.
12	Arvind Dave	IPS (1962: Madhya Pradesh)	1997	1999	• Was Secretary (R) during 1999 Kargil conflict; later testified before the Kargil Review Committee for mismanagement of intelligence operations.
13	A. S. Dulat	IPS (1965: Rajasthan)	1999	2000	• Was Special Director, IB and transferred to R&AW prior to appointment. • Negotiated with IC 814 hijackers • Tenure market with deep engagement in Kashmir affairs.
14	Vikram Sood	IPoS (1966); Absorbed into RAS	13 December 2000	31 March 2003	• Was Secretary (R) during the 2001 Parliament attack. • One of the few Secretary (R) to appointed from a non-IPS stream.
15	C. D. Sahay	IPS (1967: Karnataka)	1 April 2003	31 January 2005	• Participated in negotiations to end 2001 IC 814 hijack prior to appointment. • First-ever Secretary (R) to be trained in Israel. • Was Secretary (R) during Rabinder Singh defection scandal.
16	P. K. H. Tharakan	IPS (1968: Kerala)	1 February 2005	31 January 2007	• Investigated the 2001 IC 814 hijack. • Negotiated the end of Nepalese Civil War and helped warring parties to sign the Comprehensive Peace Accord.
17	Ashok Chaturvedi	IPS (1970: Madhya Pradesh)	1 February 2007	31 January 2009	• Tenure marred by alleged decay of institutional decorum. • Investigated officer from Sri Lankan station accused of indiscipline.
18	K. C. Verma	IPS (1971: Jharkhand)	1 February 2009	30 December 2010	• Permanent deputation from IB. • Was Secretary (Security) to Cabinet Secretariat and Internal Security Advisor to Home Ministry prior to appointment. • Spearheaded investigation of the 26/11 Mumbai terrorist attacks.
19	Sanjeev Tripathi	IPS (1972: Uttar Pradesh); Absorbed into RAS	30 December 2010	29 December 2012	• Previously head of ARC prior to appointment.
20	Alok Joshi	IPS (1976: Haryana)	30 December 2012	30 December 2014	• Joint Director, IB prior to appointment. • Appointed Chairman of the National Security Advisory Board in 2025.
21	Rajinder Khanna	RAS (1978)	31 December 2014	31 December 2016	• Specialized in counter-terror operations at R&AW. • Appointed as Deputy NSA in 2018; promoted to Additional NSA in 2024.
22	Anil Dhasmana	IPS (1981: Madhya Pradesh)	1 January 2017	29 June 2019	• Led intelligence efforts during the 2019 Balakot airstrikes. • Served as Chairman, NTRO between 2020 and 2023.
23	Samant Goel	IPS (1984: Punjab)	1 July 2019	30 June 2023	• Led R&AW's operations wing prior to appointment. • Led intelligence efforts during the 2016 surgical strikes and 2019 Balakot airstrikes.
24	Ravi Sinha	IPS (1988: Chhattisgarh)	1 July 2023	30 June 2025	• Led R&AW's operations wing prior to appointment. • Provided emphasis on technical intelligence collection capabilities.
25	Parag Jain	IPS (1989: Punjab)	1 July 2025	Incumbent	• Handled R&AW's Pakistan desk; served in Kashmir during abrogation of Article 370 and 35A. • Led ARC during Operation Sindoor prior to appointment.

== See also ==
- Cabinet Secretary of India
- Foreign Secretary of India
- Director of Intelligence Bureau
- National Security Advisor (India)
