= List of spymasters =

A spymaster is a leader of a group of spies or an intelligence agency.

== List of spymasters ==
Name	When	Allegiance	Agency/Organization/Service
Motojiro Akashi	1904	Japan	Akashi Kikan
Lavrentiy Beria	1938	Soviet Union	NKVD
Wilhelm Canaris	1935	Nazi Germany	Abwehr
Thomas Cromwell	1533	Kingdom of England	
William J. Donovan	1941	United States	Office of Strategic Services
Armand Jean du Plessis (Cardinal Richelieu)	1616	Kingdom of France	
Allen Dulles	1953	United States	Central Intelligence Agency
L.B. Moerdani	1952–1988	Indonesia	State Intelligence Agency
A.M. Hendropriyono	1945	Indonesia	State Intelligence Agency
Ali Murtopo	1945–1978	Indonesia	State Intelligence Agency
Yoga Sugama	1942–1989	Indonesia	State Intelligence Agency
Zhou Enlai	1928–1932	Chinese Communist Party (Note: Years of service as a spymaster with the Chinese Communist Party predates the foundation of the People's Republic of China (1949))	Special Service section of the Central Committee; Urban Work Committee of the Central Committee
Rafaat Gebril	1973	Egypt	General Intelligence Directorate (Egypt)
Fadhil Barrak	1976–1989	Iraq	Iraqi Intelligence Service
Muhammad al-Khuli	1970–1987	Syria	Air Force Intelligence Directorate
Ali Mamlouk	2005–2024	Syria	National Security Bureau; General Intelligence Directorate (Syria)
Sándor Goldberger (alias J. Peters)	1930–1948	Soviet Union	Communist Party USA
Sidney Gottlieb	1951–1973	United States	Central Intelligence Agency
Hamid Gul	1987–1989	Pakistan	Director-General of Inter-Services Intelligence
Javed Nasir	1992-1993	Pakistan	Director-General of Inter-Services Intelligence
Faiz Hameed	2019	Pakistan	Director-General of Inter-Services Intelligence
Isser Harel	1952–1963	Israel	Mossad
Ronnie Kasrils	1983–1989; 2004–2008	South Africa	Umkhonto we Sizwe; Minister of Intelligence Services
David Kimche	1953–1980	Israel	Mossad
Ivone Kirkpatrick	1918–1918	United Kingdom	British Army, Belgian resistance
Maxwell Knight	1924–1930	United Kingdom	MI5
Chee Woh, Leong	1971–1984	Malaysia	Special Branch
Dai Li	1928–1946	Republic of China	National Revolutionary Army
Colin Hercules Mackenzie	1940–1946	United Kingdom	Special Operations Executive – Force 136
Tengku Mahmood Mahyideen	1942–1945	British Malaya	Special Operations Executive – Force 136 (Malayan region)
Yuri Modin	1948–1951	Soviet Union	NKVD
Hugh Montgomery	1953–1981 (CIA) 1981–1985 (INR) 1989–2014 (CIA)	United States	Central Intelligence Agency Bureau of Intelligence and Research
Donald Nichols	1951	United States	6004th Air Intelligence Service Squadron
Manuel Piñeiro	1961–1964	Cuba	Dirección de Inteligencia
Allan Pinkerton	1855–1861	United States	Union Intelligence Service
Wang Puchen	1948–1949	Republic of China	Bureau of Investigation and Statistics
Pyotr Rachkovsky	1885–1902	Russian Empire	Okhrana
Alfred Redl	1903–1913	Austria-Hungary; Russian Empire (Note: Redl was appointed as the head of counterintelligence at the Evidenzbureau, the Austro-Hungarian military intelligence organization in 1907. However, Redl was already compromised by Russian agents c. 1900, and provided information to the Russian Empire until he was caught by Austro-Hungarian authorities in 1913.)	Evidenzbureau
Mao Renfeng	1946–1956	Republic of China	Bureau of Investigation and Statistics
Semyon Semyonov	1937–1950	Soviet Union	NKVD
Kang Sheng	1940s–1946	Chinese Communist Party	Central Social Affairs Department
Hugh Sinclair	1919–1939	United Kingdom	Secret Intelligence Service
Mansfield Smith-Cumming	1909–1923	United Kingdom	Secret Intelligence Service
Richard Sorge	1920–1941	Soviet Union	Main Intelligence Directorate
Sidney Souers	1946–1946	United States	Director of the Central Intelligence Agency
Gustav Steinhauer	1911–1914	Germany	Nachrichten-Abteilung
William Stephenson	1940–1946	Canada	British Security Co-ordination
Emanuel Sueyro	c. 1620–1629	Spain	
Benjamin Tallmadge	1778–1783	United States	Culper Ring
John Thurloe	1653	Commonwealth of England	
Liam Tobin	1919	Irish Republic	Irish Republican Army
Francis Walsingham	1573–1590	Kingdom of England	
George Washington	1775	United States	Continental Army
William Wickham	1795–1801	United Kingdom	
Markus Wolf	1951–1986	East Germany	Main Directorate for Reconnaissance
Shen Zui	1934–1949	Republic of China	Bureau of Investigation and Statistics
Kyrylo Budanov	2020–present	Ukraine	Main Directorate of Intelligence (Ukraine)
Bhola Nath Mullik	1950–1964	India	Intelligence Bureau
R. N. Kao	1968–1977	India	Research and Analysis Wing
Vikram Sood	1966-2003	India	Research and Analysis Wing
Maloy Krishna Dhar	1968-1996	India	Intelligence Bureau
Ajit Doval	1968–2004; 2014-Present	India	Intelligence Bureau; National Security Advisor of India
Zvi Zamir	1948-1973	Israel	Mossad
R. N. Ravi	1974-2012; 2018-2019	India	Intelligence Bureau; Deputy National Security Advisor of India
Rajinder Khanna	1978–2016; 2018-2024; 2024-Present	India	Research and Analysis Wing; Deputy National Security Advisor of India; Additional National Security Advisor of India
Anil Dhasmana	1981–2019	India	Research and Analysis Wing
Samant Goel	1984-2023	India	Research and Analysis Wing
Ravi Sinha	1988–2025	India	Research and Analysis Wing
Tapan Deka	1988-2026	India	Intelligence Bureau
Parag Jain	1989–Present	India	Research and Analysis Wing
David Barnea	1996–2026	Israel	Mossad
Roman Gofman	1995-Present	Israel	Mossad
Mahesh Dixit	1993-Present	India	Intelligence Bureau
Sergey Naryshkin	2016–present	Russia	SVR
Mikhail Lyubimov	1959–1980	Soviet Union	KGB

== See also ==
- List of American spies
- List of British spies
- List of German spies
- List of fictional spymasters

== Bibliography ==
- Gokhale, Nitin. Gentleman Spymaster:R.N.Kao. Bloomsbury Publishing India Pvt Ltd. ISBN 978-9354358913.
