= Jija Madhavan Harisingh =

Indian police officer (born 1951)

Jija Madhavan Harisingh (Neerja madhavan)
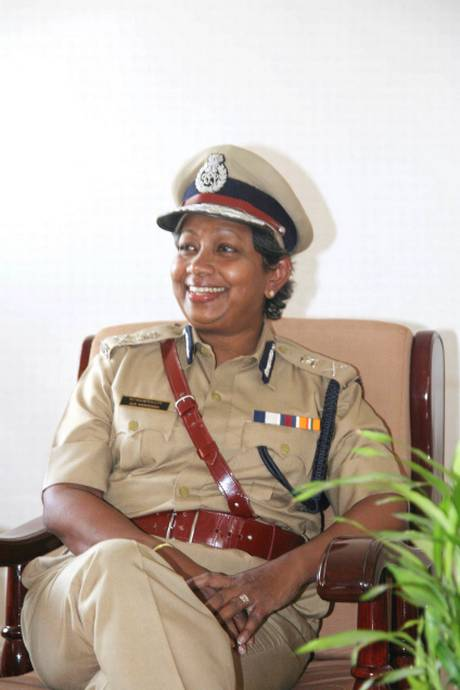
- Dr. Jija M. Harisingh IPS

Officer, Indian Police Service
- In office 1975–2011

Personal details
- Born: Jija Madhavan; 8 January 1951 (age 75) Trivandrum, Kerala, India
- Parent(s): Sri T K Madhavan and Smt Ponnamma
- Education: B.A English; M.A English; M.A Sociology; Ph.D.
- Alma mater: University of Kerala, Trivandrum; Mysore University
- Occupation: Artist, social activist, retired IPS officer
- Website: jijaharisingh.com

Jija Madhavan Harisingh (born 8 January 1951) is a retired officer of the Indian Police Service (IPS) and an artist. During her career, Harisingh served in a number of administrative and law-enforcement positions in the state, working across different wings of the Karnataka Police. She has also exhibited her artwork in India and internationally, including solo shows in Washington, Wollongong and New Delhi, and exhibitions in London, Vienna, Berlin and Jakarta.

== Indian Police Service career ==
Jija Harisingh joined the Indian Police Service in 1975 as part of the Karnataka cadre, having qualified through the civil services examination. She is reported to be the first woman IPS officer in the state of Karnataka.

She remained in service for 36 years and retired in 2011 as Director General of Police (DGP).

== Early life and education ==
Dr. Jija Hari Singh started her schooling in the Holy Angels Convent in Trivandrum. She also studied in several other schools including Government school in Sreekaryam and in Palakkad too. She did her graduation and post graduation in English literature from the University College. While doing her post graduation she developed the hobby of creative writing and also acquired a post graduate diploma in Journalism. Even after joining the Indian Police Service in 1975, she continued her learning and education, doing many in service training programs in India and abroad. She also gained another MA Degree in Sociology from Mysore University. She went on to work on a PhD in Development Studies on the topic of her special interest, women's empowerment, doing a socio-economic study of the women recruited into Police in the state of Karnataka, from Police Constable to DSP.

Research study with title Gender status in Karnataka police a study of entry level cadres in women police under University of Mysore by Jija Madhavan Harisingh is published in Shodhganga.

== Artist of repute ==
A recipient of the Indira Priyadarshini National Award for Contribution to Arts, Jija Harisingh is an artist of repute who has held solo exhibitions in Washington, Wollongong and New Delhi. Her work has also been exhibited in London, Vienna, Berlin, Jakarta etc. Jija Madhavan Harisingh was one of the fifty Indian women artists chosen by Indian Council for Cultural Relations (ICCR) for the international exhibitions of the Amrita Shergil Revisited project.

Jija is presently the President of the Institute of Directors, Bangalore Chapter and the Honorary President of The Art Mantram Foundation, a not-for-profit trust that promotes Indian art.

Dr. Jija M. Harisingh in conversation with Vinod Narayan@Penpositive on Arts and Art Mantram.

WisdomCircle and INK collaborative Interview of Jija Madhavan Harisingh, one of the honourees of 58 Over 58.
