= Parag Jain =

25th Secretary of R&AW

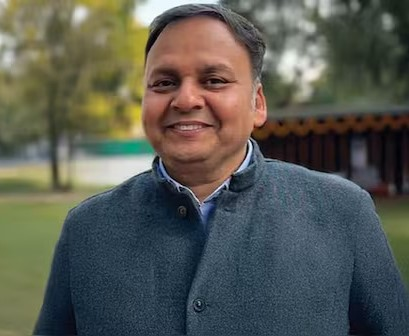
- Jain in 2025

25th Secretary of the Research and Analysis Wing
- Incumbent
- Assumed office 1 July 2025
- President: Droupadi Murmu
- Prime Minister: Narendra Modi
- Preceded by: Ravi Sinha

Secretary (Security) of the Special Protection Group
- In office 12 November 2025 – 24 May 2026
- President: Droupadi Murmu
- Prime Minister: Narendra Modi
- Preceded by: Manoj Govil
- Succeeded by: Rajiv Singh

Personal details
- Born: 1 January 1967 (age 59) Nawla village, Muzaffarnagar, Uttar Pradesh, India
- Spouse: Seema Jain
- Education: St Stephen's College, Delhi (B.A., M.A.); University of Birmingham (M.B.A.); National Police Academy
- Awards: Police Medal for Meritorious Service
- Police career
- Allegiance: India
- Branch: Punjab Police
- Service years: 1989 — present
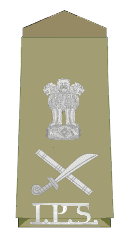
- Rank: Director General of Police

Parag Jain (born 1 January 1967) is an Indian bureaucrat and spymaster who is currently serving as the 25th Secretary of the Research and Analysis Wing since July 2025. He also served as Secretary (Security) of the Special Protection Group from November 2025 till May 2026. He is known for playing a crucial role in the Operation Sindoor, which was launched by India in May 2025.

== Early life and education ==
Jain was born on 1 January 1967 in Nawala village, Muzaffarnagar, Uttar Pradesh, India. He has completed M.A. in History from the St Stephen's College, Delhi University and his M.B.A. in Public Service from the University of Birmingham.

== Career ==
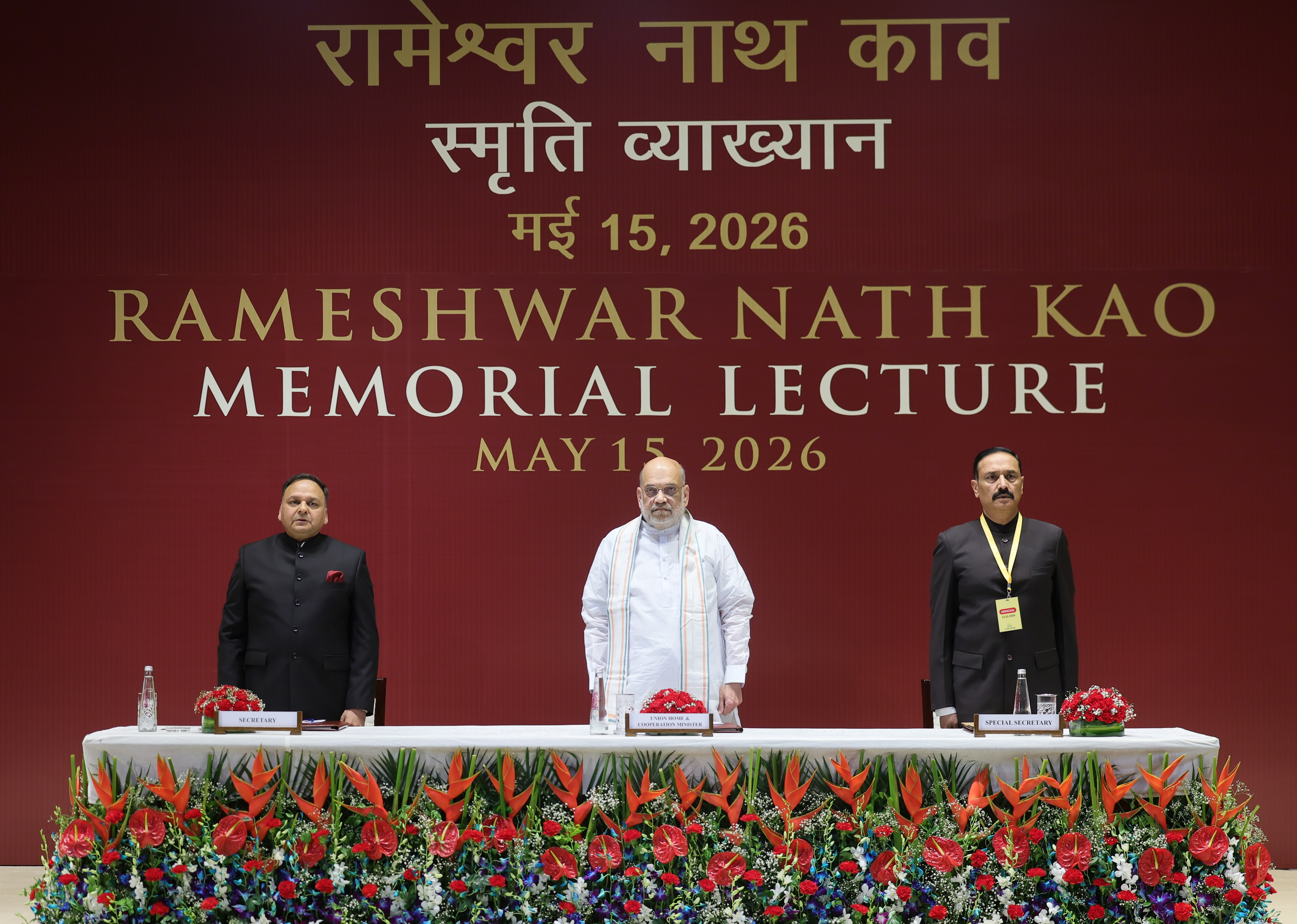
Shri Amit Shah delivered the R.N Kao Memorial Lecture on the subject Narcotics: A Borderless Threat, A Collective Responsibility. Shri Parag Jain was standing to right of Union Home Minister.

Jain joined the Indian Police Service through Punjab Police in 1989.

Jain spent his career both home and abroad. As an SSP, he served at Chandigarh. Later he was appointed as DIG of the Ludhiana range. In 2005, he was awarded the Police Medal for Meritorious Service.

Reportedly, while assigned at Hoshiarpur, he fought against terrorists part of the Khalistan Movement. He was known to handle affairs related to Pakistan within R&AW. He was serving at Kashmir during the 2019 Balakot airstrike and abrogation of Article 370. As foreign deputation, he was posted at Sri Lanka and Canada. While posted in Canada, he oversaw Khalistani activities.

In 2021, he was promoted to the rank of Director General of Police. On the time of promotion, he was on deputation to the Cabinet Secretariat.

Prior to his appointment as Secretary of R&AW, he led the Aviation Research Centre, where he intensified the use of satellites and modernised the existing spy planes.

On November 12, 2025, he was given the additional charge of the Secretary (Security), administrative head of the elite force that protects the Prime Minister of India.

== See also ==
- Ravi Sinha
- Tapan Deka
- Mahesh Dixit
