= Sukhmohinder Singh Sandhu =

Indian police chief

As of 2011 Sukhmohinder Singh Sandhu was senior superintendent of Indian Police Services (IPS) in the state of Punjab. Sandhu served in important positions during the terrorism days in Punjab. He is considered to be a close ally of ADGP Sumedh Singh Saini.

== Honors ==
Sandhu is the only officer in the history of the Indian Police Service (IPS) to be called back from retirement and promoted to IPS from Punjab Police Services.

== Assassination attempt ==
Early in 1992, an unsuccessful assassination attempt was made on him by terrorists in Ludhiana using a bomb.

== Allegations ==
Along with ADGP Saini and two other Punjab police officers, Sandhu was charged in the kidnapping, illegal detention and disappearance of two businessmen and their driver. The victims were allegedly picked up by the police and then disappeared. This case is pending in the court and the CBI is investigating.
