= Samant Goel =

23rd Secretary of Research & Analysis Wing

Secretary of the Research and Analysis Wing
- In office 29 June 2019 – 30 June 2023
- Preceded by: Anil Dhasmana
- Succeeded by: Ravi Sinha

Personal details
- Born: 13 May 1960 (age 66) India
- Education: (Bcom) (LLB) Panjab University
- Profession: Civil servant Spymaster

Samant Kumar Goel is an Indian spymaster and a retired 1984 batch IPS officer from Punjab cadre who served as the Secretary of the Research and Analysis Wing from 2019 to 2023. He was appointed as secretary on 26 June 2019, succeeding Anil Dhasmana.

== Education ==
Goel completed his Bachelor of Commerce degree and LLB degree from the Panjab University in Chandigarh.

== Career ==
Goel, who belongs to the Punjab cadre, was involved in the planning of the Balakot air strike and played an important role in checking militancy in Punjab. He is a recipient of the Police Medals for Gallantry and Meritorious Service, and joined the R&AW in 2001.

Goel has also served as Chief of Station, Europe Desk and as Chief of Station in London.

Preceded by Anil Dhasmana	Secretary, R&AW; 29 June 2019 – present	Succeeded by Ravi Sinha
