= Wang Puchen =

- Native name: 王蒲臣
- Born: July 12, 1901; Jiangshan, Zhejiang, Qing Dynasty
- Died: Taipei, Republic of China
- Allegiance: Republic of China
- Service years: 1921-2005
- Rank: Major General
- Commands: Investigation and Statistics Bureau
- Conflicts: Second Sino-Japanese War, Chinese Civil War

Major General Wang Puchen (Chinese: 王蒲臣; pinyin: Wang Puchen; July 12, 1901 - 2005) was born in Jiangshan of Qing Dynasty China's Zhejiang province. He was the Director of the Bureau of Investigation and Statistics for northern China stationed in Beijing. He reported directly to National Intelligence Director Dai Li.

== Books ==
Wang Puchen authored several books including:

- "滚滚浪沙九十秋" - Turbulent Waves With Sands for 90 Autumns (1991)
- "一代奇人戴笠將軍" - Legendary General Dai Li (June 12, 2003)
- "三莅美境，六度月园" - Three Visits to US Seeing Six Full Moons
