= Indian Police Service =

One of the All India Civil Services (IPS)

- Service Overview
- Motto: सत्यमेव जयते (Sanskrit) "Truth Alone Triumphs"

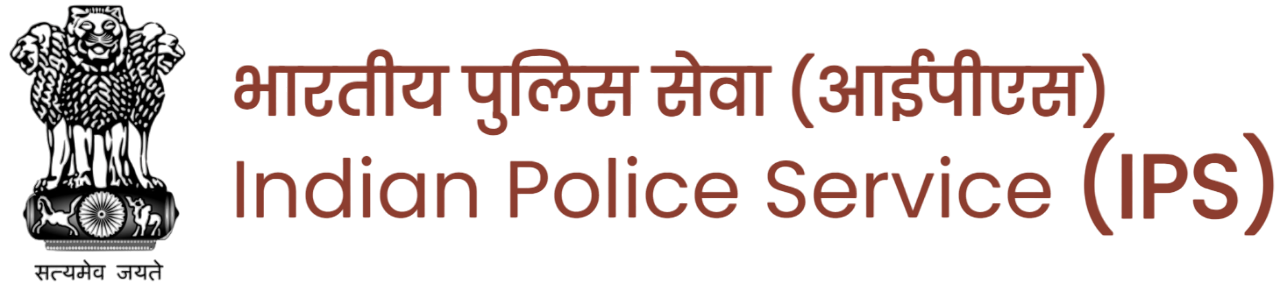
- Abbreviation: IPS
- Date of establishment: 26 January 1950; 76 years ago
- Country: India
- Staff college: Sardar Vallabhbhai Patel National Police Academy, Hyderabad, Telangana
- Cadre controlling authority: Ministry of Home Affairs (Police-I Division)
- Minister responsible: Amit Shah, Minister of Home Affairs
- Legal personality: Governmental: Civil Service
- Duties: Ensuring internal security, safety, and security of public and public property, law and order, detection and prevention of crime, intelligence input collection and analysis, conduct combat operations.
- Cadre strength: 5,047 members (2023) (4,344 officers in position; 703 position vacant)
- Selection: Civil Services Examination
- Association: IPS Central Association

Head of the All India Services
- Cabinet Secretary: T. V. Somanathan, IAS

https://ips.gov.in/

The Indian Police Service (IPS) is the premier policing arm of the All India Services of Government of India. It replaced the Indian Imperial Police in 1948, a year after India became independent from the British Empire.

Along with the Indian Administrative Service (IAS) and the Indian Forest Service (IFS), the IPS is part of the All India Services – its officers are employed by both the Union Government and by individual state governments.

The service provides leadership to various state and central police forces and law enforcement agencies including the Central Armed Police Forces (BSF, SSB, CRPF, CISF, and ITBP), the National Security Guard (NSG), Narcotics Control Bureau (NCB), National Disaster Response Force (NDRF), Intelligence Bureau (IB), Research and Analysis Wing (R&AW), Railway Protection Force (RPF), National Technical Research Organisation (NTRO), Special Protection Group (SPG), National Investigation Agency (NIA), and the Central Bureau of Investigation (CBI).

== History ==
There is no alternative to this administrative system... The Union will go, you will not have a united India if you do not have a good All-India Service which has the independence to speak out its mind, which has a sense of security that you will stand by your work... If you do not adopt this course, then do not follow the present Constitution. Substitute something else... these people are the instrument. Remove them, and I see nothing but a picture of chaos all over the country.

— Sardar Vallabhbhai Patel in Constituent Assembly discussing the role of All India Services

=== Indian Imperial Police ===
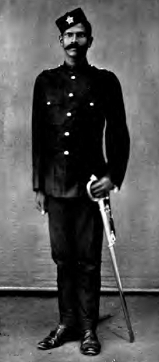
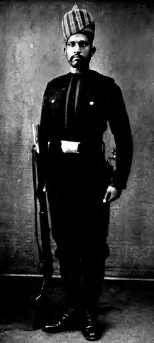
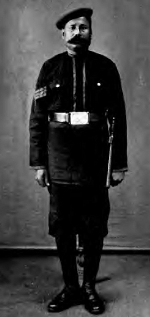
Jamadar, constable, and sergeant – NCO positions opened to Indians until 1920 in the Indian Imperial Police

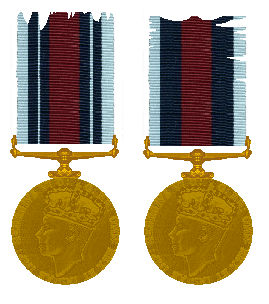
Indian Police Medal issued in 1940

In 1861, the Parliament of the United Kingdom introduced the Indian Councils Act 1861. The act created the foundation of a modern and professional police bureaucracy in India. It introduced a new cadre of police, called Superior Police Services, later known as the Indian Imperial Police. The highest rank in the service was the inspector general for each province. The rank of inspector general was equated to that of a brigadier, and similar ranks in the Indian Armed Forces, as per a central warrant of precedence issued in 1937. (Note: The rank of IGP is ranked and equated with the rank of Brigadier / equivalent rank of the Indian Armed Forces as per Warrant of Precedence – 1937, as per Ministry of Home Affairs' directions contained in Letter No 12/11/99-Pub II dated 26 December 1966. This Warrant of Precedence is compiled from a joint consideration of the existing Central Warrant of Precedence (which is up to the rank of Major General) and Warrant of Precedence – 1937, as per the Ministry of Home Affairs' directions contained in Letter No 12/11/99-Pub II dated 26 December 1966, the validity of which has been confirmed by Letter No 12/1/2007-Public dated 14 August 2007. The MHA confirmed in 2007 that the Old Warrant of Precedence shall be taken as a guide to determine ranks below those mentioned in the current WoP.)

In 1902–1903, a police commission was established to recommend reforms under Sir Andrew Fraser and Lord Curzon. It recommended the appointment of Indians as officers in the police. Previously, Indians could rise only to the rank of an inspector, the senior N.C.O. position. However, they were not part of the Indian Imperial Police. From 1920 onwards, the Indian Imperial Police was open to Indians, and the entrance examination for the service was conducted both in India and the U.K.

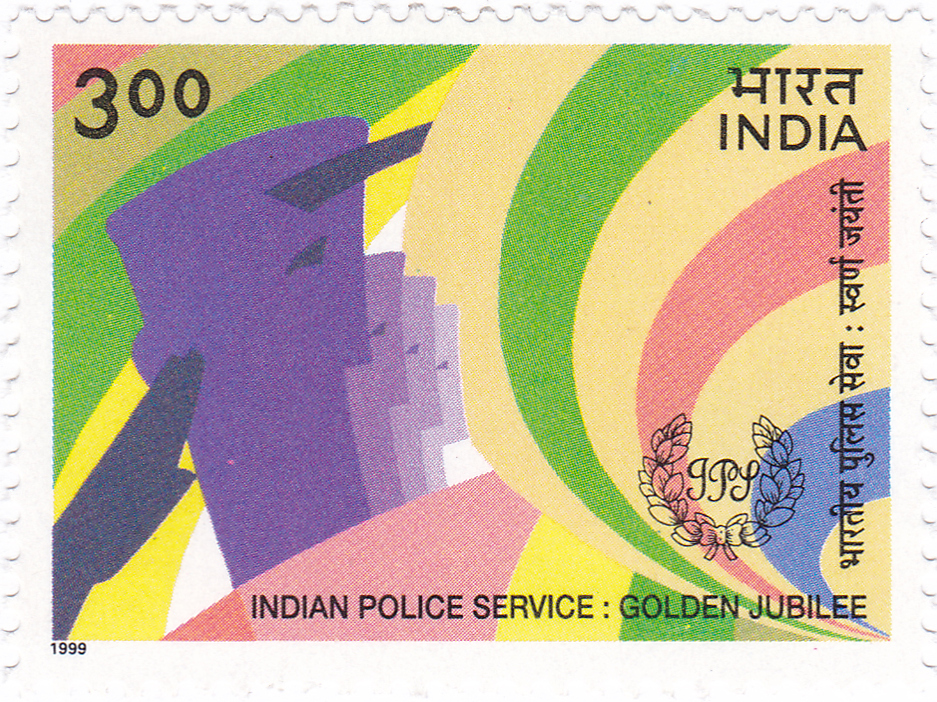
A 1999 stamp dedicated to the 50th anniversary of IPS

Before Independence, senior police officers belonging to the Imperial Police (IP) were appointed by the Secretary of State based on a competitive examination. The first open civil service examination for admittance to the service was held in England in June 1893, and the ten top candidates were appointed as probationers in the Indian Imperial Police. It is not possible to identify an exact date for when the Indian Police Service came formally into being.

Around 1907, the secretary of state's officers were directed to wear the letters "IP" on their epaulettes to distinguish them from other officers not recruited by the secretary through examination. Therefore, 1907 could be regarded as the starting point for the IPS. In 1948, a year after India gained independence, the Imperial Police was formally replaced by the Indian Police Service.

=== Indian Police Service ===
The Indian Police Service was created under Article 312(2), XIV of the Constitution of India. As per media reports, there is a massive shortage of IPS officers in India, amounting to nearly 19% to 22% of the sanctioned strength.

==== Medals and decorations ====
Despite having a very small cadre strength, many IPS officers have been awarded the highest gallantry awards (Ashok Chakra, Kirti Chakra). The current national security advisor of India, Ajit Doval, was an IPS officer who earned the Kirti Chakra for his gallant actions during Operation Black Thunder. Though generally deployed in supervisory roles at senior levels, it is not uncommon for IPS officers to be in the field, taking an active part in maintaining law and order. IPS officers have been posted to various UN Missions, and several have been awarded the United Nations Medal. Many exceptional IPS officers have been awarded Padma awards from time to time.

== Objective ==
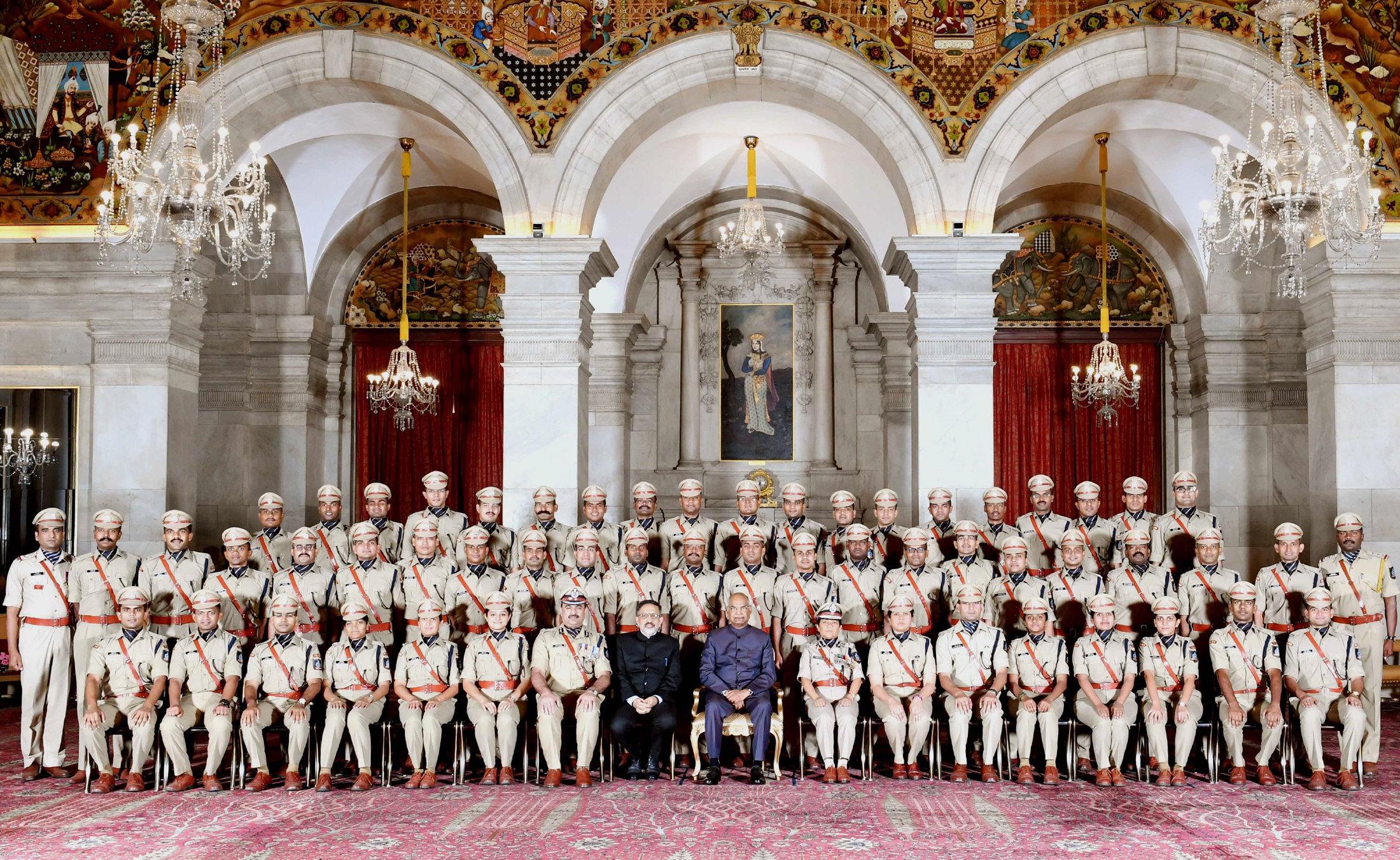
Former President of India Ram Nath Kovind with Indian Police Service officers at the Rashtrapathi Bhavan in New Delhi, 2018.

The First Police Commission, appointed on 17 August 1865, contained detailed guidelines for the desired system of police in India and defined the police as a governmental department to enforce the law, maintain order, and to detect and prevent crime across the region. The Indian Police Service is not a force but a service providing leaders and commanders to staff the state police and all-India Central Armed Police Forces. Its members are the senior officers of the police. With time, the Indian Police Service's objectives were updated and redefined. The current roles and functions of an Indian Police Service officer are as follows:

- To fulfil duties based on border responsibilities, in the areas of maintenance of public peace and order, crime prevention, investigation, and detection, collection of intelligence, VIP security, counterterrorism, border policing, railway policing, tackling smuggling, drug trafficking, economic offenses, corruption in public life, emergency management, enforcement of socioeconomics legislation, biodiversity and protection of environmental laws, etc.
- Leading and commanding the Indian Intelligence Agencies like Research and Analysis Wing (R&AW), Intelligence Bureau (IB), Central Bureau of Investigation (CBI), Criminal Investigation Department (CID) etc., Indian Federal Law Enforcement Agencies, Civil and Armed Police Forces in all the states and union territories.
- Led and commanded various Central Armed Police Forces (CAPF) which include the Central Police Organisations (CPO) such as Border Security Force (BSF), Central Reserve Police Force (CRPF), Indo-Tibetan Border Police (ITBP), National Security Guard (NSG), Central Industrial Security Force (CISF), Vigilance Organisations and Indian Federal Law Enforcement Agencies.
- To lead and command the force with courage, uprightness, dedication and a strong sense of service to the people.
- Endeavor to teach in the police forces under their command such values and norms as would help them serve the people better.
- Inculcate integrity of the highest order, sensitivity to people's aspirations in a fast-changing social and economic milieu, respect for human rights, the broad liberal perspective of law and justice, and a high standard of professionalism.

== Recruitment ==
The peaked cap worn by Indian Police Service officers as part of their uniform code.

IPS officers are recruited from the Civil Services Examination conducted by UPSC. They are also promoted from State Police Services and DANIPS. However, at present, recruitment from Limited Competitive Examination has been put on hold.

=== Training ===
The training of IPS officer recruits is conducted at Sardar Vallabhbhai Patel National Police Academy in Hyderabad. The authorized cadre strength of the Indian Police Service is 4920. (3270 Direct Recruitment Posts and 1650 Promotional Posts). The Civil List of IPS officers is an updated (annual) list maintained by the Ministry of Home Affairs, Government of India that lists the posting details of all IPS officers in India. This Civil List can be accessed from the MHA website. It allows searching for an IPS officer based on their name, batch, or cadre. After completion of almost 2 years of training, IPS probationers are awarded a master's degree in criminal justice management from NALSAR University of Law.

=== State cadres ===
==== Cadre allocation policy ====
The Union Government announced a new cadre allocation policy for the All India Services in August 2017, touting it as a policy to ensure national integration of the bureaucracy as officers and ensure the All-India character of the services. Under the new policy, the existing 26 cadres have been divided into five zones in the new policy by the Department of Personnel and Training of the Government of India. Under the new policy, a candidate has to first give their choice in the descending order of preference from amongst the various Zones. Subsequently, the candidate has to indicate one preference of cadre from each preferred zone. The candidate indicates their second cadre preference for every preferred zone subsequently. The process continues till a preference for all the cadres is indicated by the candidate. The preference for the zones/cadres remains in the same order, and no change is permitted. Officers continue to work in the cadre they are allotted or are deputed to the Government of India.

Zones under the new Cadre Allocation Policy
Zone	Cadres
Zone-I	AGMUT (Arunachal Pradesh-Goa-Mizoram and Union Territories including erstwhile state of Jammu and Kashmir), Himachal Pradesh, Uttarakhand, Punjab, Rajasthan and Haryana.
Zone-II	Uttar Pradesh, Bihar, Jharkhand and Odisha.
Zone-III	Gujarat, Maharashtra, Madhya Pradesh and Chhattisgarh.
Zone-IV	West Bengal, Sikkim, Assam-Meghalaya, Manipur, Tripura and Nagaland.
Zone-V	Andhra Pradesh, Karnataka, Kerala, Tamil Nadu and Telangana.

==== Old cadre allocation policies ====
Till 2008, there was no system of preference for state cadres by the candidates; the candidates, if not placed in the insider vacancy of their home states, were allotted to different states in alphabetical order of the roster, beginning with the letters A, H, M, T for that particular year. For example, if in a particular year, the roster begins from 'A', which means the first candidate on the roster will go to the Andhra Pradesh state cadre of IPS, the next one to Bihar, and subsequently to Chhattisgarh, Gujarat, and so on in alphabetical order. The next year the roster starts from 'H', for either Haryana or Himachal Pradesh (if it has started from Haryana on the previous occasion when it all started from 'H', then this time it would start from Himachal Pradesh). This highly intricate system, in vogue since the mid-1980s, had ensured that officers from different states were placed all over India.

The system of permanent state cadres has also resulted in wide disparities in the kind of professional exposure for officers when we compare officers in small and big and also developed and backward states. Changes of state cadre are permitted on grounds of marriage to an All India Service officer of another state cadre or under other exceptional circumstances. The officer may go to their home state cadre on deputation for a limited period, after which they have to invariably return to the cadre allotted to them.

From 2008 to 2017, IPS officers were allotted to state cadres at the beginning of their service. There was one cadre for each Indian state, except for two joint cadres: Assam–Meghalaya and Arunachal Pradesh–Goa–Mizoram–Union Territories (AGMUT). The "insider-outsider ratio" (ratio of officers who were posted in their home states) is maintained as 1:2, with one-third of the direct recruits as 'insiders' from the same state. The rest were posted as outsiders according to the 'roster' in states other than their home states, as per their preference.

== Ranks and career advancements ==
=== Ranks and insignia ===
Though the standard uniform colour is khaki, The ranks, posts, and designations of IPS officers vary from state to state as law and order is a federalism in India. But generally, the following pattern is observed.

==== IPS officer ranks ====
IPS officers are appointed on the basis of either Civil Service Examination or promoted from the state police service cadre (state civil service officers). Vacancies in the IPS cadre are determined based on vacancy on an superintendent of police rank. Consequently, there are two levels of gradation for SP rank. These are levels 11 and 12 as per the Seventh Pay Commission. Resultantly, IPS officers remain on the rank of SP till the 13th year, after which they are eligible for being promoted as Senior Superintendent of Police (SSP). ASP rank is the junior-most rank on an IPS state cadre. Consequently, fresh recruits to IPS are variously posted as Assistant Superintendent of Police in a supernumerary capacity (only for training purpose for two years and after that for 1 year) till they are formally placed as Superintendent of Police In-Charge of an area (when they get the pay of level 11 and level 12) and as district in charge (when they get the pay of level 12) (only in non-metropolitan districts). When the officers get promoted to the rank of SSP, some of them are posted to the district in charge of metropolitan districts.

Indian Police Service cadre officers rank insignia
Insignia
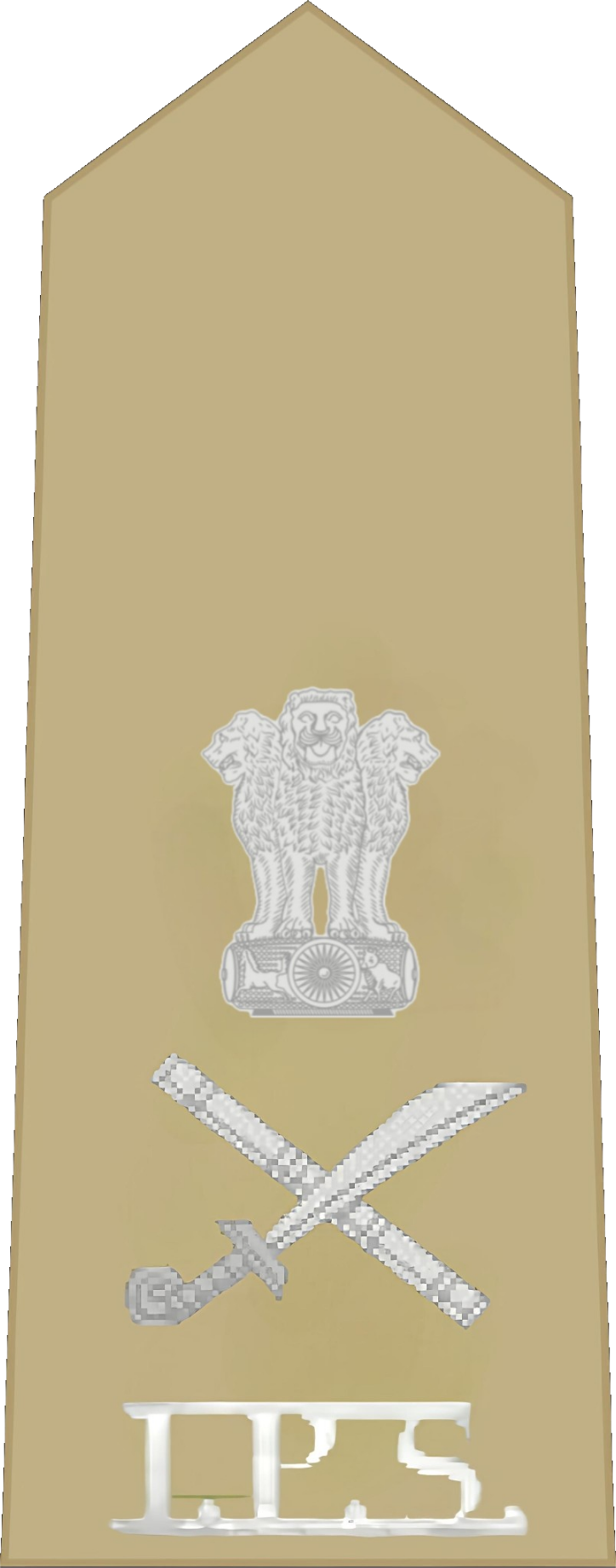
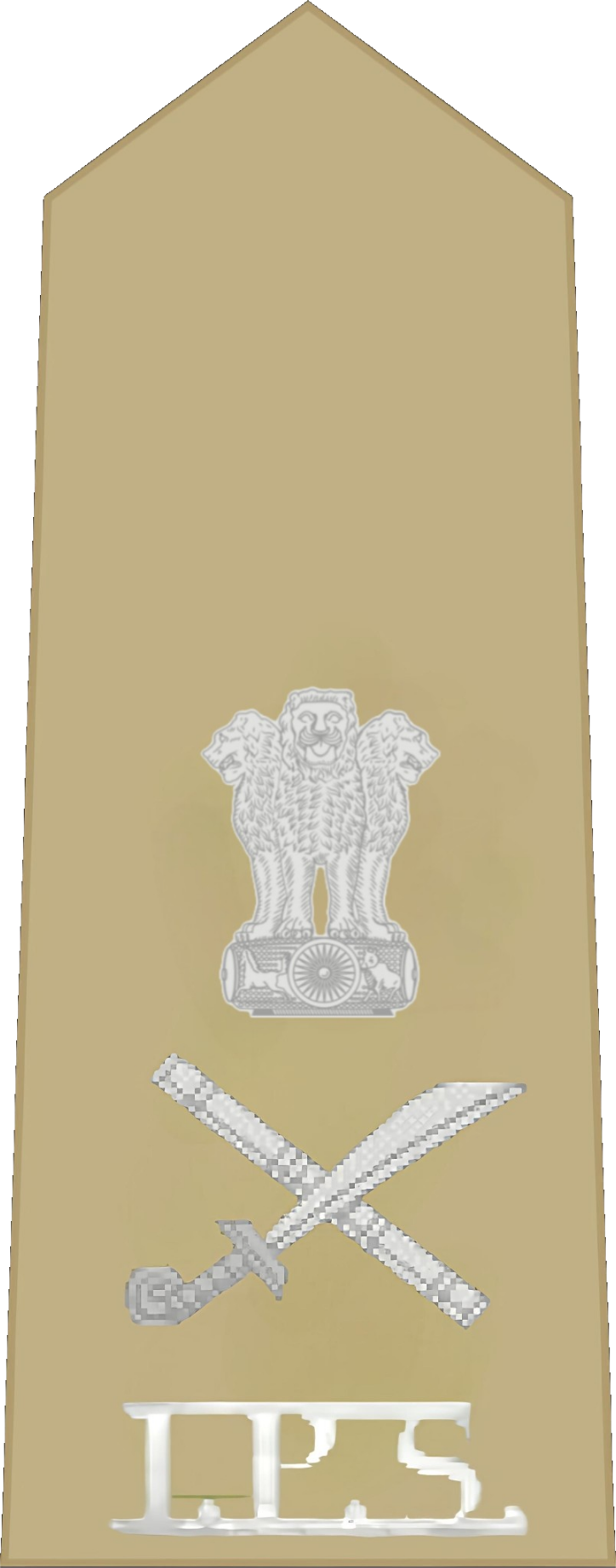
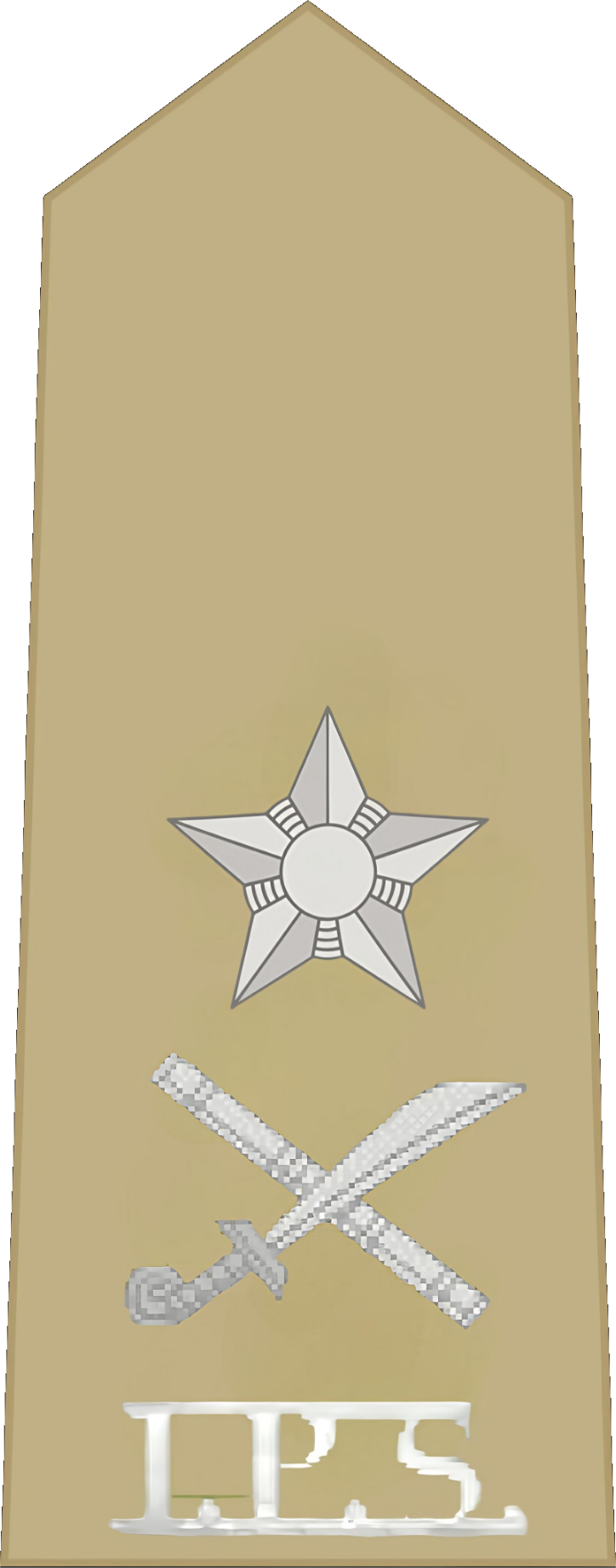
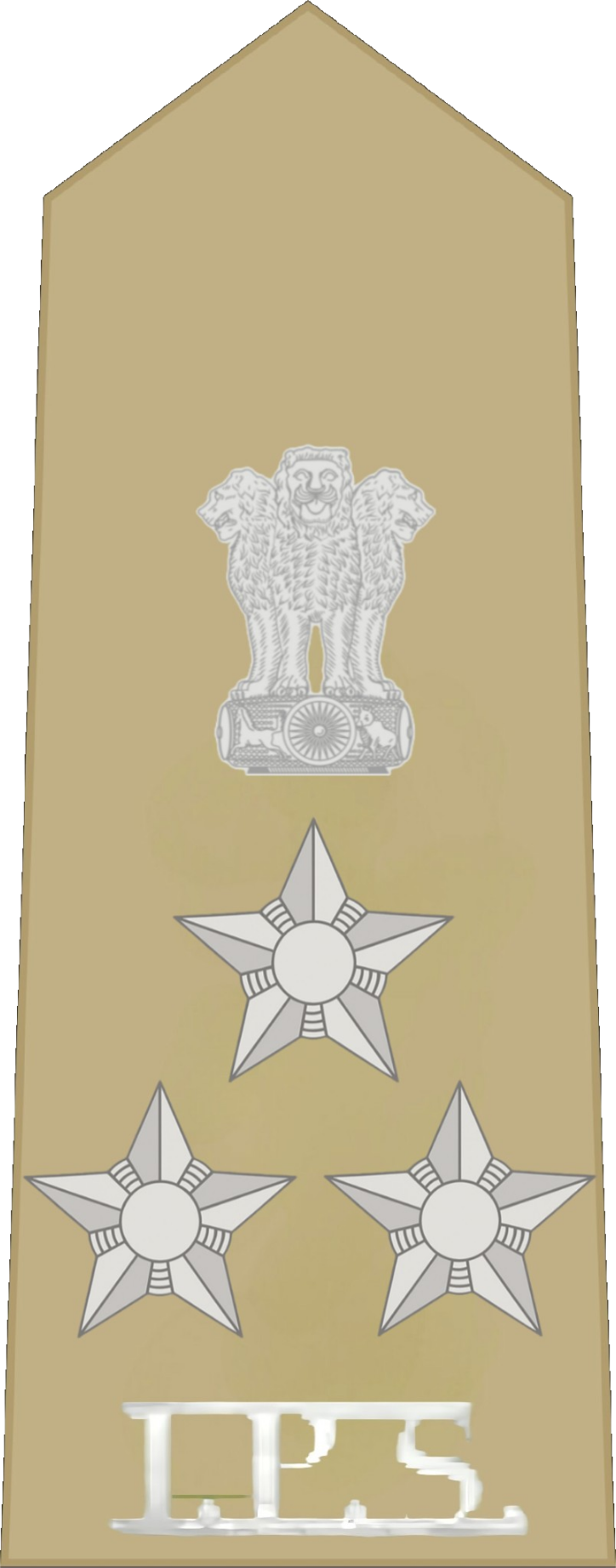
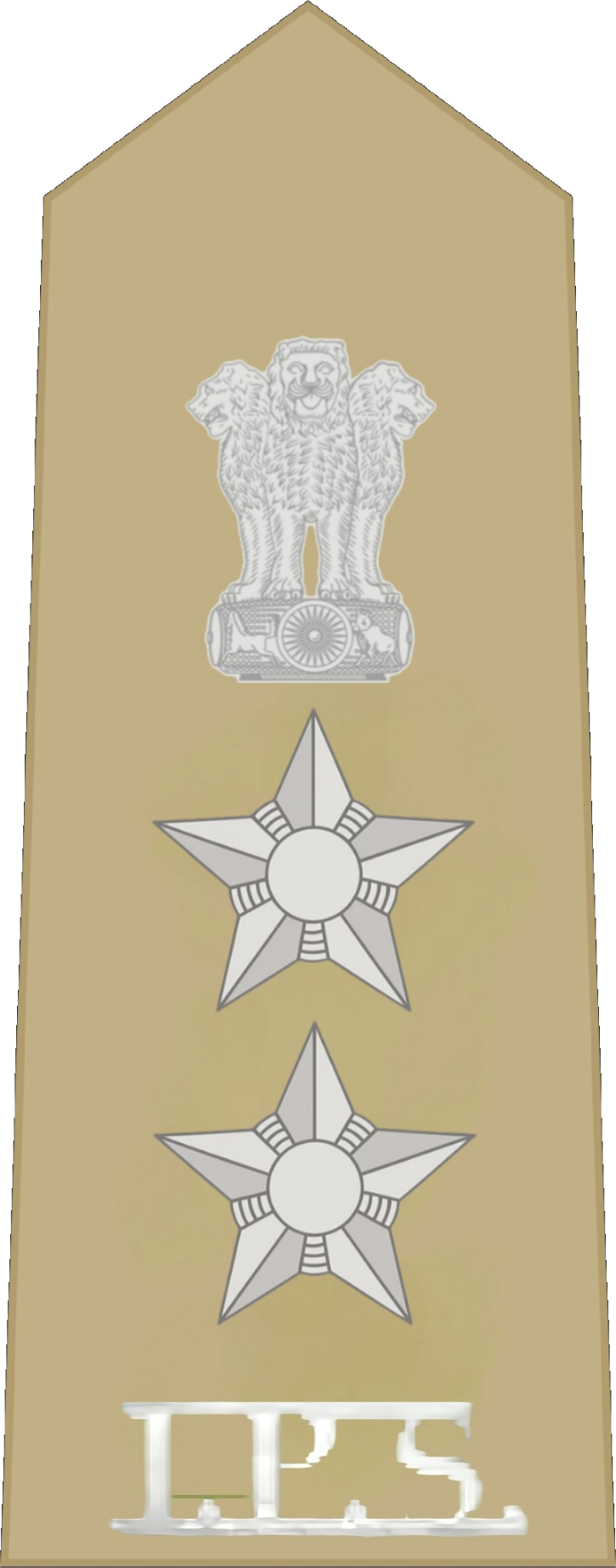
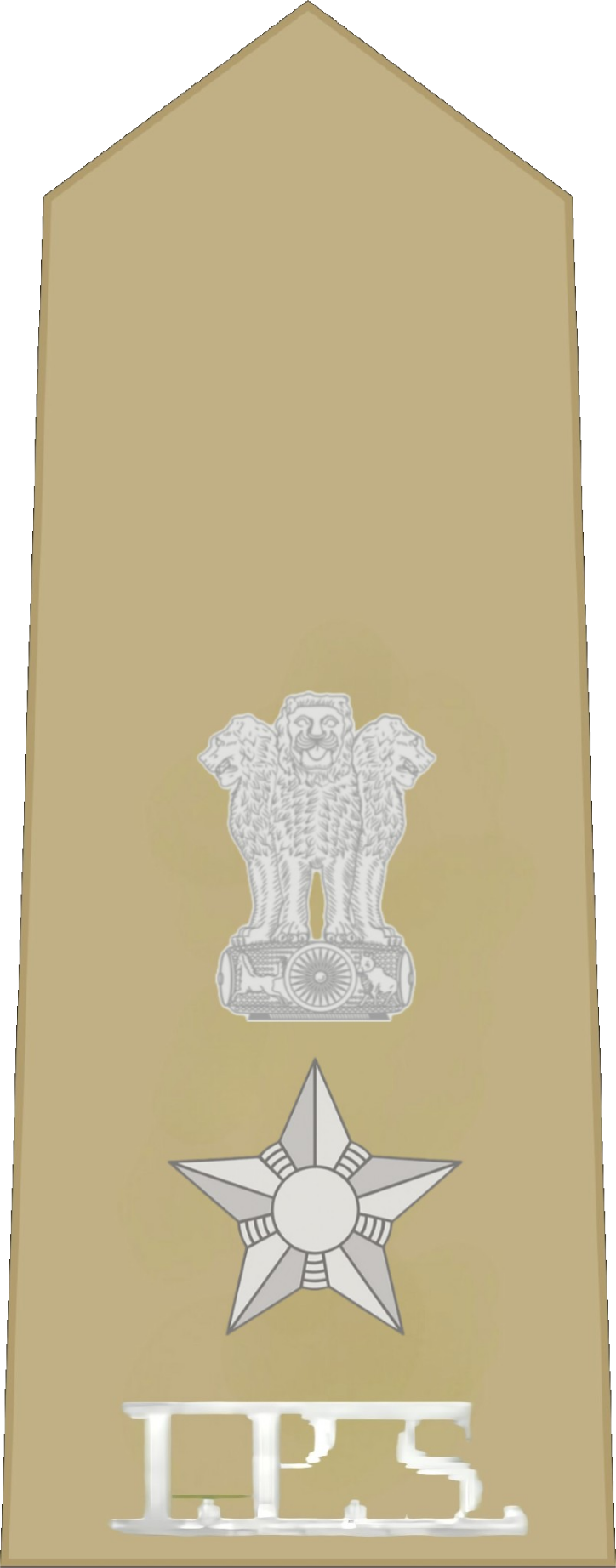
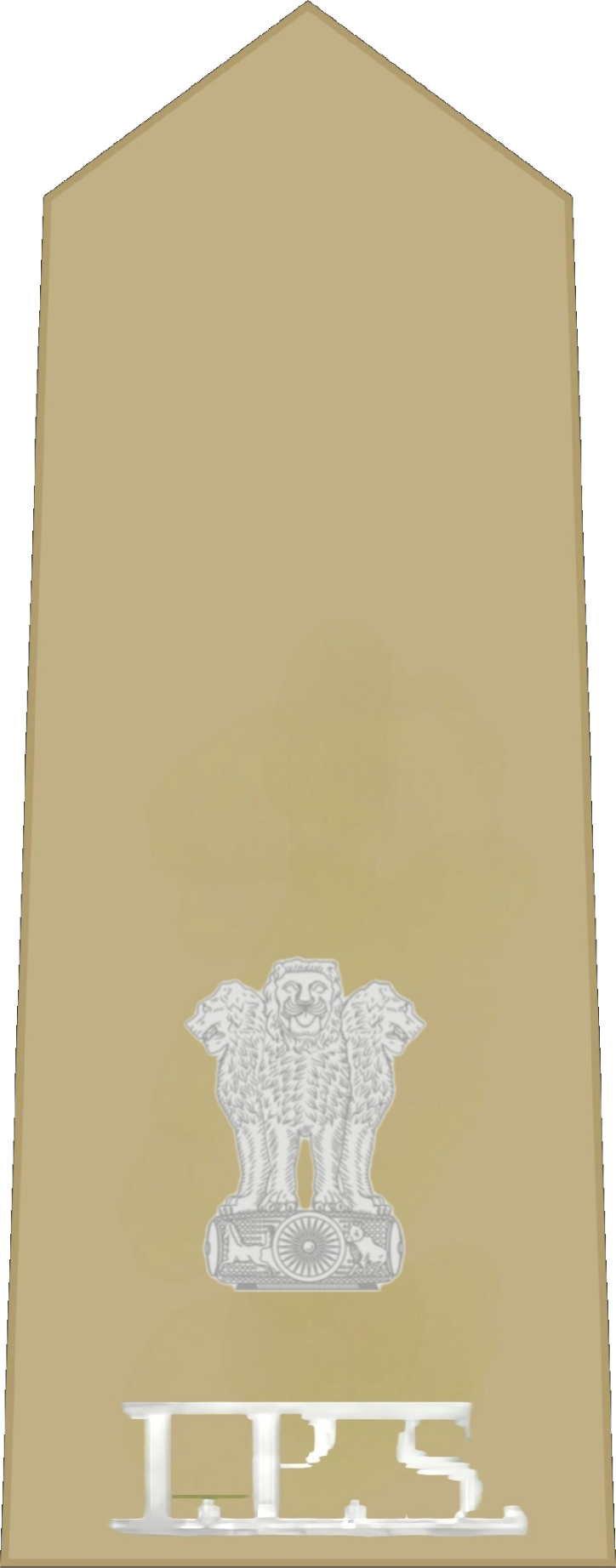
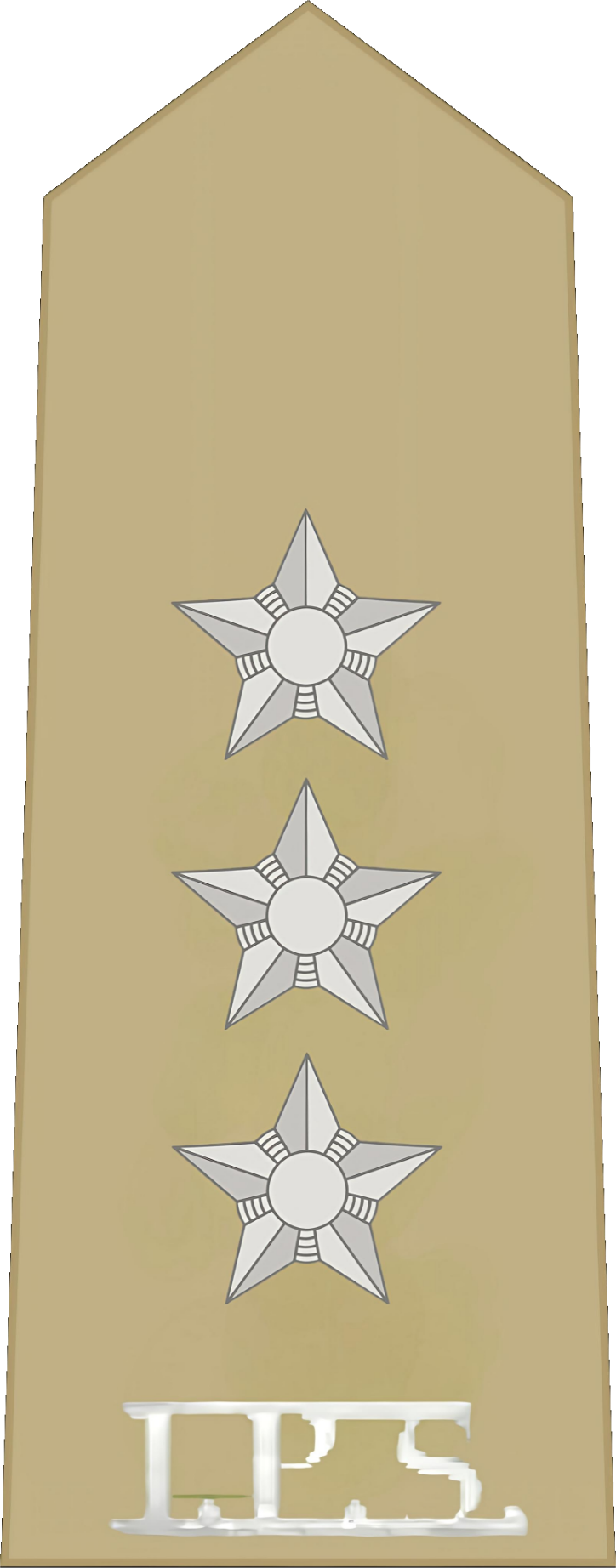
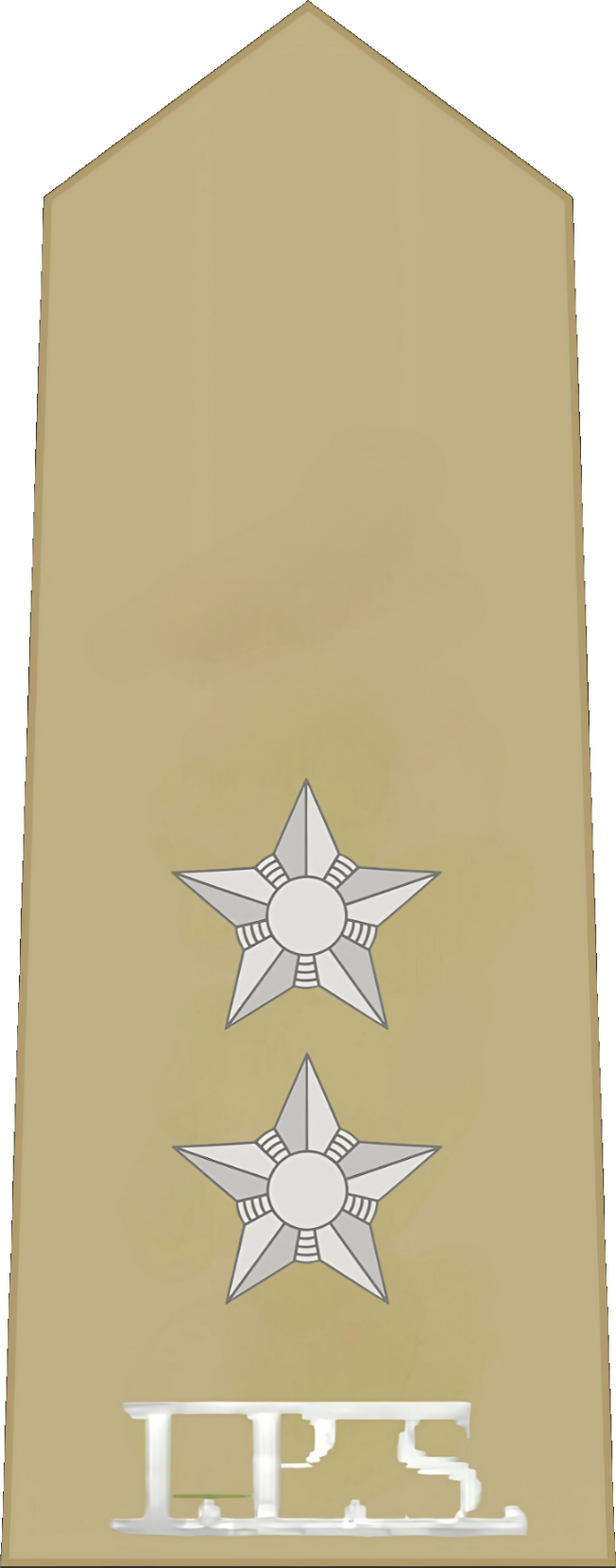
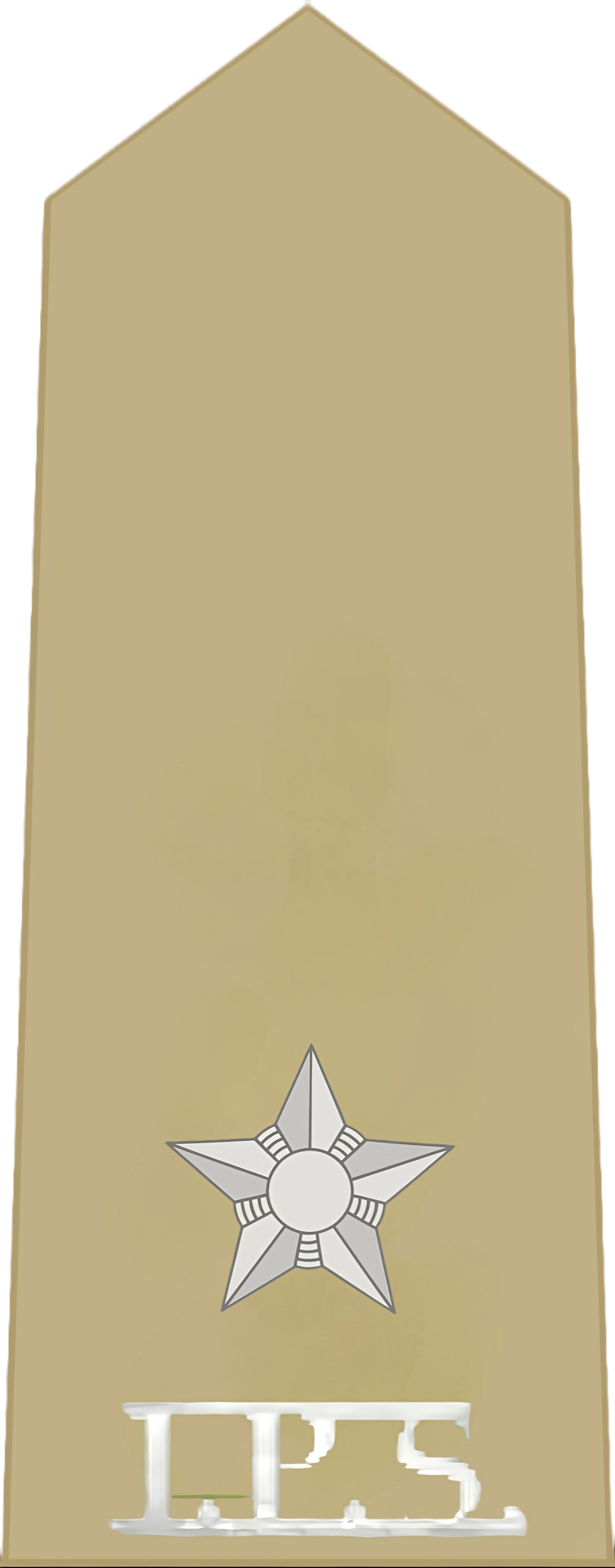
Rank
Director General of Police
Additional Director General of Police (Note: Rank insignia of DGP is similar to Additional DGP.)
Inspector General of Police
Deputy Inspector General of Police
Superintendent of Police (Selection Grade) (Note: The Senior Superintendent of Police (SSP) is a post, not a rank, typically held by an SP (selection grade or junior grade) in states like Uttar Pradesh, Jammu and Kashmir, and Punjab.)
Superintendent of Police
Additional superintendent of police
Assistant Superintendent of Police
Assistant superintendent of police (Probationary for two years)
Assistant Superintendent of Police (Probationary for one year)
Abbreviation
DGP
ADGP
IGP
DIGP
SP (SG)
SP
Addl.SP
ASP
ASP
ASP

- Note 1: The rank insignia of DGP, Spl.DGP, Addl.DGP is the same.
- Note 2: The equivalent rank to the ASP (Asst.SP) in State Police Services is the deputy superintendent of police (DSP/DySP).
- Note 3: The commissioner of police is a post typically held by DIG and above rank officers.

=== Pay structure of the Indian Police Service ===
Pay structure of the Indian Police Service
Insignia	Grade/level on pay matrix	Position in the state government(s)	Other positions or designation in the union territory government(s) or the Government of India (GOI)	Position in Indian order of precedence	Basic pay (monthly)	Military Equivalent
—N/a	Apex scale (pay level 17)	—N/a	Secretary (R), R&AW, Cabinet Secretariat; Secretary (S), SPG, Cabinet Secretariat; Special Secretary in R&AW; Special Secretary in MHA	23	₹225,000 (US$2,404)	Army Commanders and their equivalent and vice chief of staff of the rank of Lt. General and their equivalent
	Apex scale (pay level 17)	—N/a	Director of the Intelligence Bureau (IB)	25	₹225,000 (US$2,404)	Lieutenant General; Vice Admiral; Air Marshal
	Apex scale (pay level 17)	Director General of Police (Head of Police Force of a state)	Director of the Central Bureau of Investigation (CBI); Director General of the National Investigation Agency (NIA); Director of the Special Protection Group (SPG); Commissioner of Police of Delhi; Director General of a Central Armed Police Forces (CAPF)	25	₹225,000 (US$2,404)	Lieutenant General; Vice Admiral; Air Marshal
	HAG+ Scale (pay level 16)	Director General of Police; [heading an agency or functional area (intelligence, security, traffic, vigilance, prisons, anti-corruption bureau)]: Special Director General of Police	Special Director in IB; Special Director in CBI; Special Director General in CAPFs; Director of SVPNPA; Director General of BPR&D; Director General of NCB; Director General of BCAS; Director General of NDRF	25	₹205,400 (US$2,200)—₹224,400 (US$2,400)	Lieutenant General; Vice Admiral; Air Marshal
	HAG scale (pay level 15)	Additional Director General of Police; [heading a functional wing or agency (law and order, crimes, traffic, intelligence, economic offences unit)]: Commissioner of Police of the Chennai, Visakhapatnam, Ahmedabad, Bengaluru, Pune, Lucknow, Jaipur Police Commissionerate.	Additional Secretary in R&AW; Additional Director in IB; Additional Director General in NIA; Additional Director in CBI; Director of NCRB; Additional Director General in CAPFs.	—	₹182,200 (US$1,900)—₹224,100 (US$2,400)	Lieutenant General; Vice Admiral; Air Marshal
	Senior administrative grade (pay level 14)	Inspector General of Police	Joint Secretary in R&AW; Joint Director in IB; Inspector General in NIA; Joint Director in CBI; Joint Commissioner of Police, Delhi Police; Inspector General in CAPFs; Joint Director in SVPNPA.	—	₹144,200 (US$1,500)—₹218,200 (US$2,300)	Major General; Rear Admiral; Air Vice Marshal
	Super time scale (DIG/Conservator grade) (pay level 13A)	Deputy Inspector General of Police	Deputy Director in IB; Deputy inspector general in NIA; Deputy Inspector General in CBI; Deputy inspector general in CAPFs; Deputy Director in SVPNPA.	—	₹131,100 (US$1,400)—₹216,600 (US$2,300)	Brigadier; Commodore; Air Commodore
	Selection grade (pay level 13)	Superintendent of Police (selection grade)	Assistant Director (SVPNA); Superintendent of Police, NIA, CBI; Commandant, CAPFs	—	₹118,500 (US$1,300)—₹214,100 (US$2,300)	Colonel; Captain; Group captain
	Junior administrative grade (pay level 12)	Superintendent of Police (SP); Commandant of an Armed Police Battalion	Deputy commissioner of police in Delhi.; Superintendent of Police (SP), CBI, NIA; Assistant Director, IB; Assistant Director, NCB; Assistant Director, SVPNPA; Deputy Director, Indian Cyber Crime Coordination Center	—	₹78,800 (US$840)—₹191,500 (US$2,000)	Lieutenant colonel; Commander; Wing Commander
	Senior time scale (pay level 11)	Additional Superintendent of Police		—	₹67,700 (US$720)—₹160,000 (US$1,700)	Major; Lt. Commander; Squadron Leader
	Junior time scale (pay level 10)	Assistant Superintendent of Police	Assistant commissioner of police in Delhi and other police commissionerates.	—	₹56,100 (US$600)—₹132,000 (US$1,400)	Captain; Lieutenant; Flight lieutenant

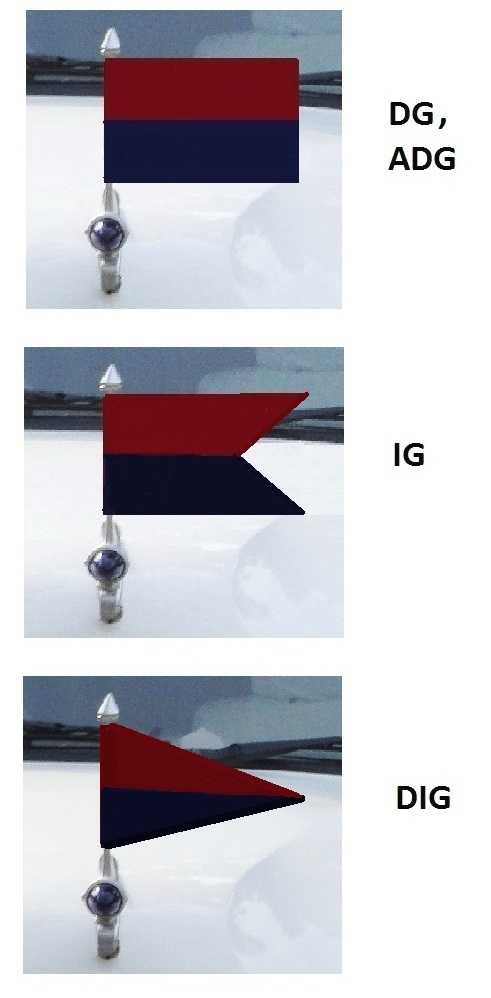
THE FLAG FOR ADGP/DGP IS ALSO APPLICABLE FOR DIB

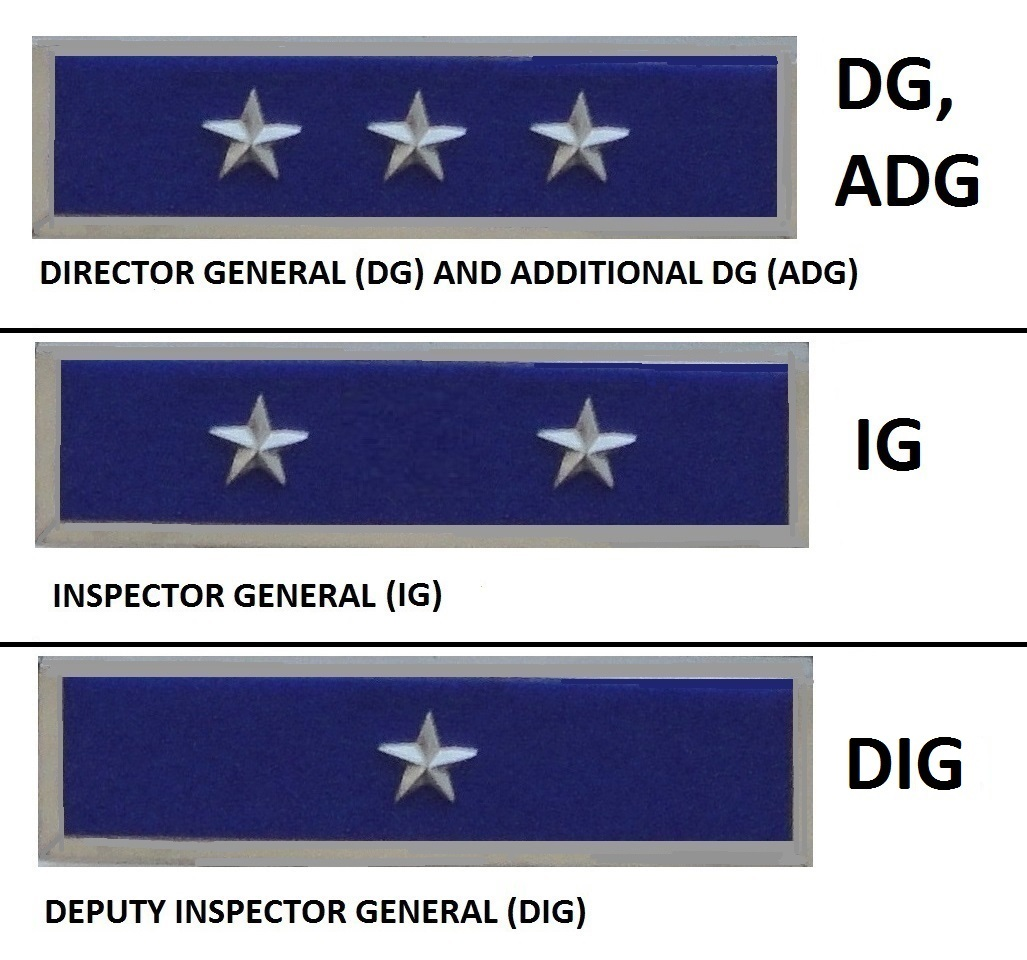
Flags (top photo) & Stars (bottom photo) on official cars of senior IPS officers, as per their rank.

== Challenges and reforms ==
As of March 2026, India's police continue to be governed by a colonial police law passed in 1861. The Indian Constitution makes policing a state subject and therefore the state governments have the responsibility to provide their communities with a police service. However, after independence, most have adopted the 1861 Act without change, while others have passed laws heavily based on the 1861 Act. Repeated major incidents, like the 2012 Delhi gang rape and murder, 2020 Hathras gang rape and murder, as well as terrorist attacks such as the 2008 Mumbai attacks revealed the failure of the police to uphold the rule of law.

The need for police reform in India has long been recognized. There have been almost 30 years of debate and discussion by government-created committees and commissions on the way forward for police reform, but India remains saddled with an outdated and old-fashioned law, while report after report gathers dust on government bookshelves without implementation. Many committees on police reform have recommended major reforms in the police system coupled with systematic accountability.

=== National Police Commission (1977–81) ===
The National Police Commission was the first committee set up by the Government of India to report on policing. The National Police Commission began sitting in 1979, in the context of a post-Emergency India, and produced eight reports, including a Model Police Act, between 1979 and 1981.

=== Ribeiro Committee (1998–99) ===
In 1996, two former senior police officers filed a Public interest litigation (PIL) in the Supreme Court, asking for the Court to direct governments to implement the recommendations of the National Police Commission. The Supreme Court directed the government to set up a committee to review the commission's recommendations, and thus the Ribeiro Committee was formed. The committee, under the leadership of Julio Ribeiro, a former chief of police, sat from 1998 and 1999, and produced two reports.

=== Padmanabhaiah Committee (2000) ===
In 2000, the government set up a third committee on police reform, this time under the stewardship of a former Union Home Secretary, K. Padmanabhaiah. This Committee released its report in the same year.

=== Malimath Committee Report (2003) ===
The Malimath Committee Report, submitted in March 2003, has very articulately laid down the foundation of a restructured and reoriented police system. The committee, in its report, observed that the success of the whole process of Criminal Justice Administration depended completely on the proper functioning of the police organisation, especially in the investigation stage. Apart from the investigation of offences, the police also have the duty of maintaining law and order.

=== Soli Sorabjee Committee (2005) ===
In 2005, the government put together a group to draft a new police act for India. It was headed by Soli Sorabjee (former attorney general). The committee submitted a Model Police Act to the Union government in late 2006.

=== Supreme Court intervention (2006) ===
In 1996, Prakash Singh (a former chief of Assam Police and Uttar Pradesh Police and subsequently Director General of the Border Security Force) initiated a Public Interest Litigation (PIL) in the Supreme Court of India, asking the court to investigate measures to reform the police forces across India to ensure the proper rule of law and improve security across India. The Supreme Court studied various reports on police reforms. Finally, in 2006, a bench of Justice Yogesh Kumar Sabharwal, Justice C. K. Thakker and Justice P.K. Balasubramanyan ordered the state governments to implement several reforms in the police force.

Several measures were identified as necessary to professionalise the police in India:

- A mid- or high-ranking police officer must not be transferred more frequently than every two years.
- The state government cannot ask the police force to hire someone, nor can they choose the Director General of the State Police.
- There must be separate departments and staff for investigation and patrolling, which will include the creation of:
  - A State Security Commission, for policies and direction
  - A Police Establishment Board, which will decide the selection, promotions, and transfers of police officers and other staff
  - A Police Complaints Authority, to inquire into allegations of police misconduct.

==== Follow-up from Supreme Court ====
In 2006, due to a lack of action by all the state governments, the Supreme Court ordered the state governments to report to it why the reform measures outlined were not implemented. After being questioned in front of the judges of the Supreme Court, the state governments finally started to reform the police forces and give them the operational independence they need for fearless and proper law enforcement. Tamil Nadu Police has been at the forefront of the application of the new reform.

Again, in October 2012, a Supreme Court bench of Chief Justice Altamas Kabir and justices S. S. Nijjar and Jasti Chelameswar asked all state governments and Union territories to inform about compliance with its September 2006 judgement. The order was passed when Prakash Singh, through his lawyer Prashant Bhushan, said that many of the reforms (ordered by the Supreme Court) have yet to be implemented by many state governments.

=== Concerns ===
==== Low training standards and personnel shortage ====
As of March 2023, India has a police-to-population ratio of 153 personnel per 100,000 citizens, which is less than the sanctioned strength of 196 and well below the United Nations minimum requirement of 222 per 100,000 citizens. The training has also fallen short of world standards, with the shortage of personnel causing investigations to suffer. These issues were previously noted in the aftermath of the 2008 terrorist attacks in Jaipur, Bangalore, and Ahmedabad.

==== Mental health and suicide ====
IPS officers have complained of high levels of stress due to long work hours and unrealistic demands of political bosses. Retired Director General of Police in Uttar Pradesh Vikram Singh believes job discontent is a combination of "no holidays, lack of sleep, the sinking feeling of failure, public treatment of policemen with contempt, the indifference of political bosses, and almost no connection with superiors". Professional stress ruins personal lives and leads to marital discord. The inability to balance professional and personal lives has led some IPS officers to commit suicide.

==== Overworking and underpaid ====
The Indian Police Service has often faced issues of being overworked and underpaid. The 7th Pay Commission mandated a pay of Rs. 21,700 per month for constables, with the Director-General of Police having a pay of Rs. 225,000 per month. The pay for constables and inspector-ranked officers varies from state to state.

Due to a lack of a shift system, many officers, especially the constable ranks, were forced to work for more than 24 hours at a stretch, with no overtime pay. This affects the quality of the investigation as well as the morale of the officials on duty. Furthermore, the constabulary also does not get decent housing or any allowances for reasonable accommodation.

In May 2022, the Mumbai Police implemented an 8-hour shift system for the constable rank officers and assistant sub-inspectors, and 16 hours of rest. Following a lawsuit by a constable of the Delhi Police for demanding fixed working hours, proper housing, and reasonable pay in 2015, the Delhi High Court ordered senior officers of implementing better working conditions for constables in May 2023.

== Corruption, Misconduct, and Human Rights Concerns ==
The Indian Police Service has, in multiple instances, been accused of serious violations of public trust. Reports, investigations, and judicial findings have repeatedly indicated that many IPS officers have been involved in grave misconduct, corruption and criminal activities including violence against women and sexual misconduct, custodial torture, and extrajudicial actions, repeated instances of bribery, and abuse of power. High-ranking officers are often found to be involved in money laundering.

Various studies have reported a documented pattern of custodial violence — physical, sexual and psychological inflicted on vulnerable individuals by the police officials. There have been many cases where First Information Report (FIRs) were deliberately ignored or suppressed particularly involving crimes against marginalized communities. In many documented and alleged cases IPS officers implicated in serious offence evade conviction due to various factors such as political protection, institutional shielding, influence over investigative processes, and prolonged procedural delays.

=== Instances by state ===
==== Andhra Pradesh (Andhra Pradesh Police) ====
===== Nidigattu Sanjay (1996 batch IPS; former CID chief) =====
Suspended on December 4, 2024, for misappropriating ₹1.76 crore (US$190,000) via manipulated tenders for the AGNI-NOC portal and SC/ST program; charges against PCA and IPC for breaches of trust. ACB FIR filed December 25, 2023, suspension extended to May 2025, per Review Committee recommendation. The Supreme Court dismissed anticipatory bail in July 2025.

==== Assam (Assam Police) ====
===== Gaurav Upadhyay (2012-batch IPS; former SP Karbi Anglong) =====
Charged in June 2025 for POSCO charges regarding sexual harassment of a minor; the CID chargesheet led to court proceedings highlighting abuse of power.

== Women in the Indian Police Service ==
Women had previously been limited to supervisory roles in the Central Armed Police Forces. The parliamentary Committee on Empowerment of Women recommended greater roles for women in the CAPF. In accordance with this recommendation, the Ministry of Home Affairs mandated preferential treatment for women in paramilitary constabularies and later declared that women could be combat officers in all five Central Armed Police Forces. The Union Home Minister announced that female representation in the CRPF and Central Industrial Security Force would be 15 percent and five percent in the Border Security Force, Indo-Tibetan Border Police and Sashastra Seema Bal. On 5 January 2016, it was decided that 33 percent of CRPF and CISF constabulary posts would be reserved for women in the CRPF and the CISF, and 14-15 percent in the BSF, SSB and ITBP.

In 1972, Kiran Bedi became the first woman Indian Police Service officer and was the only woman in a batch of 80 IPS officers, she joined the AGMUT Cadre. She was followed by Jija Madhavan Harisingh in 1975, who became the first woman Indian Police Service officer from South-India (Karnataka cadre) and she remained in service for 36 years before retirement in 2011 as Director General of Police (DGP), and Kanchan Chaudhary Bhattacharya, the second woman IPS officer belonging to the 1973 Batch, becoming the first woman director general of police of a state in India when she was appointed DGP of Uttarakhand Police.

In 1992, Asha Sinha, a 1982 Batch IPS officer, became the first woman commandant in the paramilitary forces of India when she was posted as commandant, Central Industrial Security Force in Mazagon Dock Shipbuilders and she remained in service for 34 years before retirement in 2016 as the director general of police (DGP). In 2018, an IPS officer Archana Ramasundaram of 1980 Batch became the first woman to become the director general of police of a Central Armed Police Force as DG, Sashastra Seema Bal.

In 2021, Kalpana Saxena replaced Yogesh Singh as the commandant of 47 battalion of PAC, Ghaziabad.

In 2023, Nina Singh became the director general of the Central Industrial Security Force.

== Notable people ==
- Abhayanand
- Vipul Aggarwal
- C. Sylendra Babu
- Shankar Bidari
- Kiran Bedi
- Vinod Chaubey
- Masud Choudhary
- Maloy Krishna Dhar
- Mahesh Dixit
- Ajit Doval
- Kanwar Pal Singh Gill
- Samant Goel
- Alexander Jacob
- Parag Jain
- Ashok Kamte
- R. N. Kao
- Hemant Karkare
- Atul Karwal
- Kishore Kunal
- Jacob Punnoose
- Surajit Kar Purkayastha
- Rajinder Khanna
- Amit Lodha
- Rakesh Maria
- Namo Narain Meena
- R. N. Ravi
- Anish Dayal Singh
- Lalit Vijay Singh
- Laxmi Singh
- Nina Singh
- Rishiraj Singh
- Sulkhan Singh
- Yogesh Pratap Singh
- H. T. Sangliana
- Sukhmohinder Singh Sandhu
- Rahul Sharma
- Manoj Kumar Sharma
- P. Vijayan
- D. Roopa
- V. Joseph Thomas
- Hormis Tharakan
- Amitabh Thakur
- Manoj Yadava
- Bhupendra Yadav
- Gaurav Yadav
- Jagmohan Yadav
- Julio Ribeiro
- Randhir Prasad Verma
- K. Vijay Kumar
- Nalin Prabhat
- Prakash Singh
- R. Sreelekha
- S. Subramanian
- Sukhmohinder Singh Sandhu
- Navniet Sekera
- Abdul Sathar Kunju
- Lalduhoma

== See also ==
- Commissioner of Police
- National Police Memorial India
- State Police Services India
- List of cases of police brutality in India
- Civil Services of India
- All India Services
- Special Duty Allowance
- Union Public Service Commission
