= Telecommunications in India =

- Gross adjusted revenue (2026): ₹229,071 crore (US$24 billion)

Telephony
- Total subscribers: 1,337.54 million (April 2026)
- Wireless subscribers: 1,288.96 million (April 2026)
- Fixed line subscribers: 48.58 million (April 2026)
- Monthly telephone additions (Net): 69,50,000 (April 2026)
- Teledensity: 90.28% (April 2026)
- Urban Teledensity: 152.11% (April 2026)
- Rural Teledensity: 60.74% (April 2026)
- Urban subscriber: 783.12 Million (April 2026)
- Rural subscriber: 554.41 Million (April 2026)
- Broadband subscriber: 1073.44 million (April 2026)
- Broadband subscribers (Wireless): 1026.60 million (April 2026)
- Broadband subscribers (Wireline): 46.84 million (April 2026)
- country code top-level domain: .in

India's telecommunication network is the second largest in the world by number of telephone users (both fixed and mobile phones) with over 1,337.54 million subscribers as of April 2026.

Major sectors of the Indian telecommunication industry are the telephone, internet, and television broadcast industries in the country, which are undergoing a transition towards next-generation network, increasingly employing an extensive array of modern network infrastructure such as digital telephone exchanges, network switching subsystems, media gateways, and signaling gateways at the core, interconnected by a wide variety of transmission systems using optical fiber or microwave radio relay networks. The access network, which connects subscribers to the core, is highly diversified, with different copper-pair, optical fiber, and wireless technologies. Satellite television, a relatively new broadcasting technology, has attained significant popularity in the television segment. The introduction of private FM radios stations has expanded radio broadcasting in India. Telecommunication in India has been greatly supported by the Indian National Satellite System system of the country, one of the largest domestic satellite systems in the world. India possesses a diversified communications system, which links all parts of the country through telephone, Internet, radio, television, and satellite. India's participation in global telecommunications and spectrum policy discussions is supported by the ITU-APT Foundation of India (IAFI), a sector member of ITU-R, ITU-T, and ITU-D.

The Indian telecom industry underwent a high rate of market liberalisation and growth since the 1990s and has now become the world's most competitive and one of the fastest growing telecom markets.

Telecommunication has supported the socioeconomic development of India and has played a significant role in narrowing down the rural-urban digital divide to an extent. It has also helped to increase the transparency of governance with the introduction of e-governance in India. The government has pragmatically used modern telecommunication facilities to deliver mass education programmes for rural communities in India.

According to the London-based telecom trade body GSMA, the telecom sector accounted for 6.5% of India's GDP in 2015, or about ₹9 lakh crore (US$96 billion), and supported direct employment for 2.2 million people in the country. GSMA estimates that the Indian telecom sector will contribute ₹14.5 lakh crore (US$150 billion) to the economy and support 3 million direct jobs and 2 million indirect jobs by 2020.

In today's period of progress and wealth, technological modernization is increasingly seen as a foreseen necessity for every country. With better technology and more competition from established businesses, telecommunications has entered a new era of development. The continuous rise of the mobile industry is linked to technological advancements in the telecommunications sector. The service providers' primary goal is to build a loyal customer base by measuring their performance and maintaining existing consumers in order to profit from their loyalty. The purpose of the paper is to address these concerns.

== History ==
=== Beginning ===
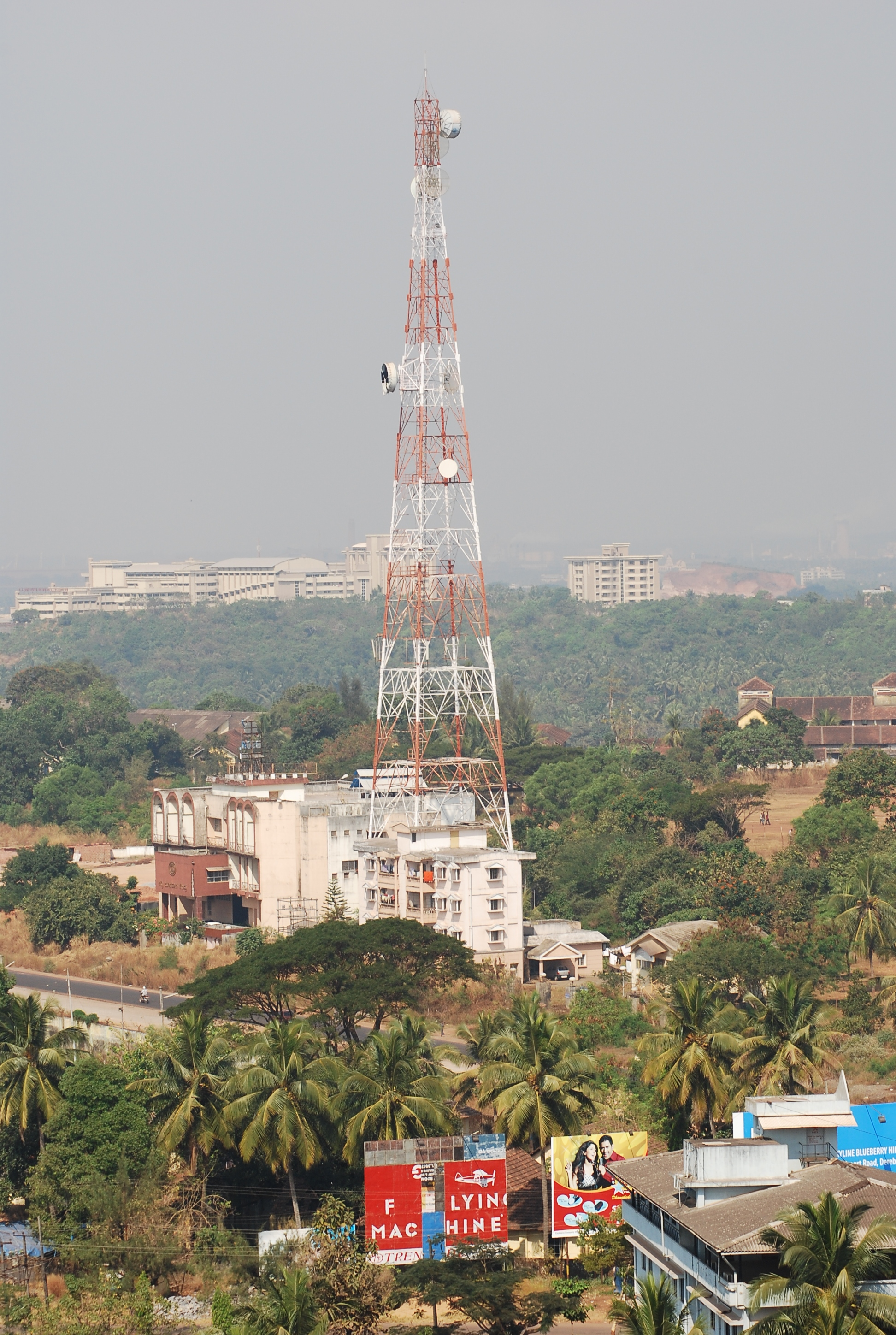
A microwave tower for short distance (~50 km) communication

Prof. S. P. Chakravarti is regarded as the father of electronics and telecommunications engineering in India. He started electronics and telecommunications education, training and research in India.

Telecommunications in India began with the introduction of telegraph. The Indian postal and telecom sectors are among the oldest in the world. In 1850, the first experimental electric telegraph line was started between Kolkata and Diamond Harbour. In 1851, it was opened for use by the British East India Company. The Posts and Telegraphs department occupied a small corner of the Public Works Department at that time.

The construction of 4,000 miles (6,400 km) of telegraph lines began in November 1853. These connected Kolkata (then Calcutta) and Peshawar in the north; Agra, Mumbai (then Bombay) through Sindwa Ghats, and Chennai (then Madras) in the south; Ooty and Bengaluru. William O'Shaughnessy, who pioneered telegraphy and telephone in India, belonged to the Public Works Department, and worked towards the development of telecom throughout this period. A separate department was established in 1854 when telegraph facilities were opened to the public.

In 1880, two telephone companies, namely the Oriental Telephone Company Ltd. and the Anglo-Indian Telephone Company Ltd. approached the Government of India to establish a telephone exchange in India. Permission was refused on the grounds that the establishment of telephone networking was a government monopoly and that the government itself should undertake the work. In 1881, the government later reversed its earlier decision and a licence was granted to the Oriental Telephone Company Limited of England for opening telephone exchanges at Kolkata, Mumbai, Chennai and Ahmedabad and the first formal telephone service was established in the country. On 28 January 1882, Major E. Baring, Member of the Governor General of India's Council declared open the Telephone Exchanges in Calcutta, Bombay and Madras. The exchange in Calcutta named the "Central Exchange" had a total of 93 subscribers in its early stage. Later that year, Bombay also witnessed the opening of a telephone exchange.

=== Further developments and milestones ===
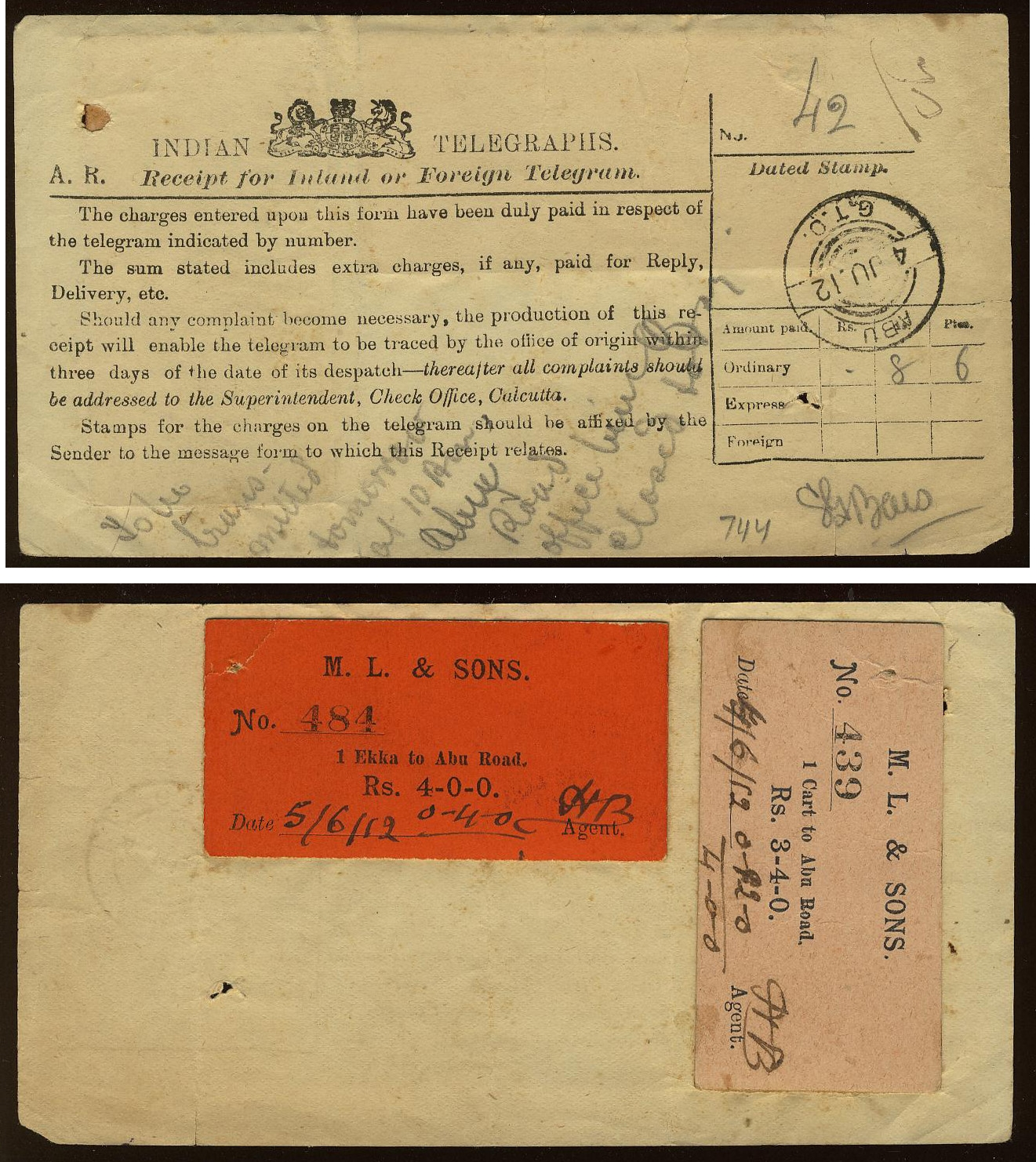
Indian telegraph receipt 1912 (front top and back bottom) with additional labels

- 1901 – First wireless telegraph station established between Sagar Island and Sandhead.
- Pre-1902 – Cable telegraph.
- 1907 – First Central Battery of telephones introduced in Kanpur.
- 1913–1914 – First Automatic Exchange installed in Shimla.
- 1927 – Radio-telegraph system between the UK and India, with Imperial Wireless Chain beam stations at Khadki and Daund. Inaugurated by Lord Irwin on 23 July by exchanging greetings with King George V.
- 1933 – Radiotelephone system inaugurated between the UK and India.
- 1947 - First Electronics and Telecommunications Engineering department started in India at the Government Engineering College, Jabalpur.
- 1951 - First TV transmitter of India was installed at the Government Engineering College, Jabalpur, on 24 October.
- 1953 – 12 channel carrier system introduced.
- 1960 – First subscriber trunk dialling route commissioned between Lucknow and Kanpur.
- 1975 – First PCM system commissioned between Mumbai City and Andheri telephone exchanges.
- 1976 – First digital microwave junction.
- 1979 – First optical fibre system for local junction commissioned at Pune.
- 1980 – First satellite earth station for domestic communications established at Sikandarabad, U.P.
- 1983 – First analogue Stored Programme Control exchange for trunk lines commissioned at Mumbai.
- 1984 – C-DOT established for indigenous development and production of digital exchanges.
- 1995 – First mobile telephone service started on non-commercial basis on 15 August 1995 in Delhi.
- 1995 – Internet Introduced in India starting with Laxmi Nagar, Delhi 15 August 1995
- 2020 – The PM-WANI framework envisages provision of Broadband through Public Wi-Fi Hotspot providers.

Development of Broadcasting: Radio broadcasting was initiated in 1927 but became state responsibility only in 1930. In 1937 it was given the name All India Radio and since 1957 it has been called Akashvani. Limited duration of television programming began in 1959, and complete broadcasting followed in 1965. The Ministry of Information and Broadcasting owned and maintained the audio-visual apparatus—including the television channel Doordarshan—in the country prior to the economic reforms of 1991. In 1997, an autonomous body was established in the name of Prasar Bharti to take care of the public service broadcasting under the Prasar Bharti Act. All India Radio and Doordarshan, which earlier were working as media units under the Ministry of I&B became constituents of the body.

Pre-liberalisation statistics: While all the major cities and towns in the country were linked with telephones during the British period, the total number of telephones in 1948 numbered only around 80,000. Post-independence, growth remained slow because the telephone was seen more as a status symbol rather than being an instrument of utility. The number of telephones grew leisurely to 980,000 in 1971, 2.15 million in 1981 and 5.07 million in 1991, the year economic reforms were initiated in the country.

=== Liberalisation and privatisation ===
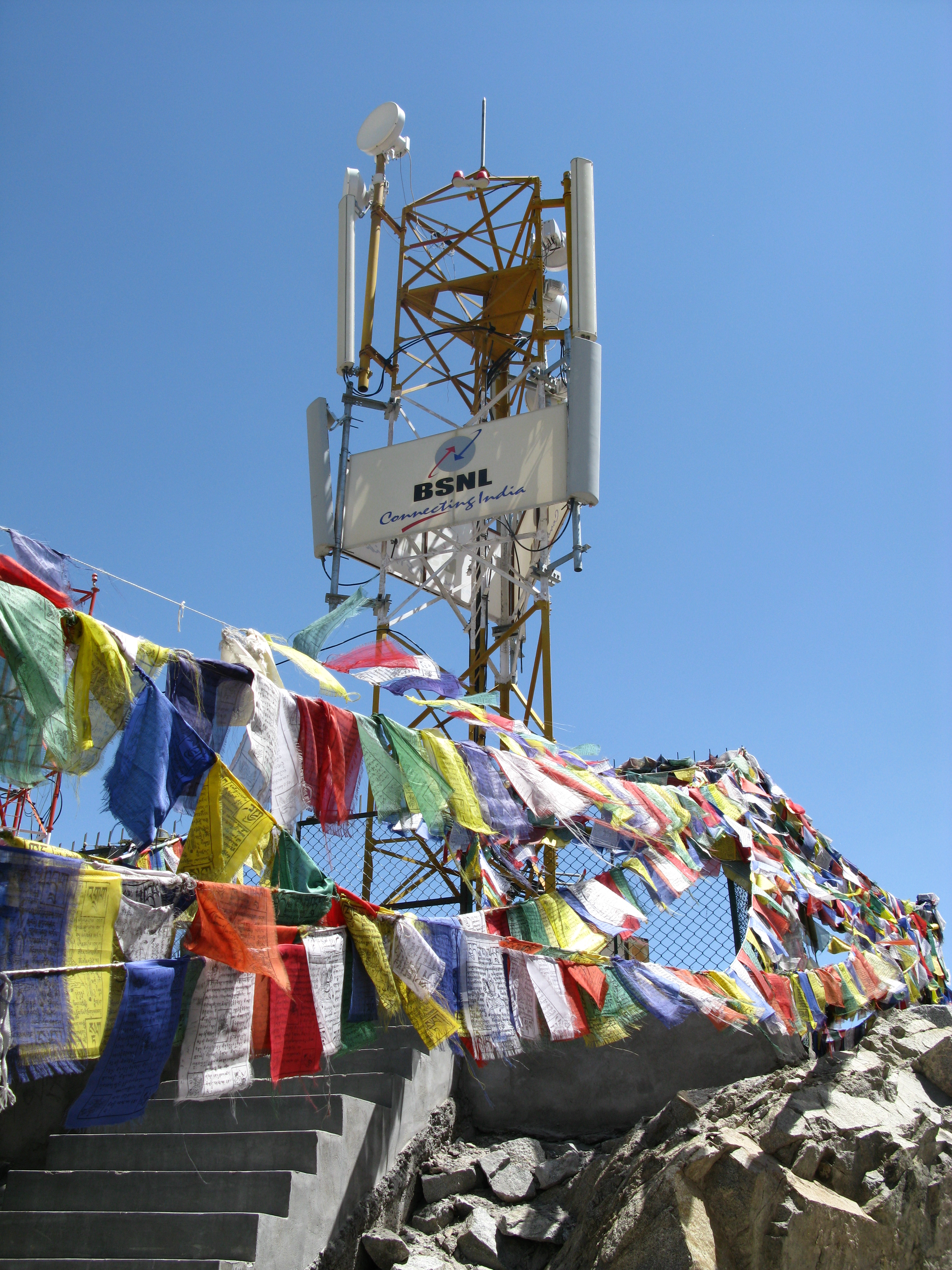
A mobile phone tower in Leh, Ladakh, India, surrounded by Buddhist prayer flags

The liberalisation of the Indian telecommunications industry started in 1981 when then Prime Minister Indira Gandhi signed contracts with Alcatel CIT of France to merge with the state owned Telecom Company (ITI), in an effort to set up 5 million telecom lines per year. Soon after the contracts were signed, the policy was left unfufilled due to political opposition. Attempts to liberalise the telecommunication industry were continued by the following government under the prime-minister-ship of Rajiv Gandhi. He invited Sam Pitroda, a US-based Non-resident Indian (NRI) and a former Rockwell International executive to set up a Centre for Development of Telematics (C-DOT) which manufactured electronic telephone exchanges in India for the first time. Sam Pitroda had a significant role as a consultant and adviser in the development of telecommunication in India.

In 1985, the Department of Telecom (DoT) was separated from Indian Post & Telecommunication Department. DoT was responsible for telecom services in entire country until 1986 when Mahanagar Telephone Nigam Limited (MTNL) and Videsh Sanchar Nigam Limited (VSNL) were carved out of DoT to run the telecom services of metro cities (Delhi and Mumbai) and international long-distance operations respectively.

The demand for telephones continued to increase and in the 1990s the Indian government was under mounting pressure to open up the telecom sector for private investment as a part of the Liberalisation-Privatisation-Globalisation policies that the government accepted to overcome the severe fiscal crisis and resultant balance of payments issue in 1991. Consequently, private investment in the sector of Value Added Services (VAS) was allowed and cellular telecom sector were opened up for competition from private investments. It was during this period that the Narsimha Rao-led government introduced the National Telecommunications policy (NTP) in 1994 which brought changes in the ownership, service and regulation of the national telecommunications infrastructure. The policy introduced the concept of telecommunication for all and its vision was to expand the telecommunication facilities to all the villages in India. Liberalisation in the basic telecom sector was also envisaged in this policy. They were also successful in establishing joint ventures between state owned telecom companies and international players. Foreign firms were eligible to 49% of the total stake. The multi-nationals were just involved in technology transfer, and not policy making.

During this period, the World Bank and ITU had advised the Indian Government to liberalise long-distance services to release the monopoly of the state-owned DoT and VSNL and to enable competition in the long-distance carrier business which would help reduce tariff's and better the economy of the country. The Rao run government instead liberalised the local services, taking the opposite political parties into confidence and assuring foreign involvement in the long-distance business after 5 years. The country was divided into 20 telecommunication circles for basic telephony and 18 circles for mobile services. These circles were divided into category A, B and C depending on the value of the revenue in each circle. The government threw open the bids to one private company per circle along with government-owned DoT per circle. For cellular service two service providers were allowed per circle and a 15 years licence was given to each provider. During all these improvements, the government did face oppositions from ITI, DoT, MTNL, VSNL and other labour unions, but they managed to keep away from all the hurdles.

In 1997, the government set up TRAI (Telecom Regulatory Authority of India) which reduced the interference of Government in deciding tariffs and policymaking. The political powers changed in 1999 and the new government under the leadership of Atal Bihari Vajpayee was more pro-reforms and introduced better liberalisation policies. In 2000, the Vajpayee government constituted the Telecom Disputes Settlement and Appellate Tribunal (TDSAT) through an amendment of the TRAI Act, 1997. The primary objective of TDSAT's establishment was to release TRAI from adjudicatory and dispute settlement functions in order to strengthen the regulatory framework. Any dispute involving parties like licensor, licensee, service provider and consumers are resolved by TDSAT. Moreover, any direction, order or decision of TRAI can be challenged by appealing in TDSAT. The government corporatised the operations wing of DoT on 1 October 2000 and named it as Department of Telecommunication Services (DTS) which was later named as Bharat Sanchar Nigam Limited (BSNL). The proposal of raising the stake of foreign investors from 49% to 74% was rejected by the opposite political parties and leftist thinkers. Domestic business groups wanted the government to privatise VSNL. Finally in April 2002, the government decided to cut its stake of 53% to 26% in VSNL and to throw it open for sale to private enterprises. TATA finally took 25% stake in VSNL.

This was a gateway to many foreign investors to get entry into the Indian telecom markets. After March 2000, the government became more liberal in making policies and issuing licences to private operators. The government further reduced licence fees for [cellular service providers and increased the allowable stake to 74% for foreign companies. Because of all these factors, the service fees finally reduced and the call costs were cut greatly enabling every common middle-class family in India to afford a cell phone. Nearly 32 million handsets were sold in India. The data reveals the real potential for growth of the Indian mobile market. Many private operators, such as Reliance Communications, Jio, Tata Indicom, Vodafone, Loop Mobile, Airtel, Idea etc., successfully entered the high potential Indian telecom market. In the initial 5–6 years the average monthly subscribers additions were around 0.05 to 0.1 million only and the total mobile subscribers base in December 2002 stood at 10.5 million. However, after a number of proactive initiatives taken by regulators and licensors, the total number of mobile subscribers has increased rapidly to over 929 million subscribers as of May 2012.

In March 2008, the total GSM and CDMA mobile subscriber base in the country was 375 million, which represented a nearly 50% growth when compared with previous year. As the unbranded Chinese cell phones which do not have International Mobile Equipment Identity (IMEI) numbers pose a serious security risk to the country, Mobile network operators therefore suspended the usage of around 30 million mobile phones (about 8% of all mobiles in the country) by 30 April 2009. Phones without valid IMEI cannot be connected to cellular operators.

India has opted for the use of both the GSM (global system for mobile communications) and CDMA (code-division multiple access) technologies in the mobile sector. In addition to landline and mobile phones, some of the companies also provide the WLL service. The mobile tariffs in India have also become the lowest in the world. A new mobile connection can be activated with a monthly commitment of US$0.15 only.

Decentralisation has been the new push by the government through PM WANI scheme launched in Dec 2020 to push Internet penetration above the current 50% threshold into smaller towns and villages. This opens up opportunities for multiple small and medium scale local business models as well as decentralized solutions using Blockchain.

=== Licence cancellation ===
On 2 February 2012, the Supreme Court ruled on petitions filed by Subramanian Swamy and the Centre for Public Interest Litigation (CPIL) represented by Prashant Bhushan, challenging the 2008 allotment of 2G licenses, cancelling all 122 spectrum licences granted during A. Raja's (Minister of Communications & IT from 2007 to 2009) term as communications minister, and described the allocation of 2G spectrum as "unconstitutional and arbitrary". The bench of GS Singhvi and Asok Kumar Ganguly imposed a fine of ₹50 million (US$530,000) on Unitech Wireless, Swan Telecom and Tata Teleservices and a ₹5 million (US$53,000) fine on Loop Telecom, S Tel, Allianz Infratech and Sistema Shyam Tele Services. According to the ruling, the then-granted licences would remain in place for four months, after which time the government would reissue the licences.

=== Consolidation ===
Post starting of the commercial operation of Reliance Jio in September 2016, the telecom market saw a huge change in terms of falling tariff rates and reduction of data charges, which changed the economics for some of the telecom players. This resulted in exit of many smaller players from the market. Players like Videocon and Systema sold their spectrum under spectrum trading agreements to Airtel and RCOM respectively in Q4 2016.

On 23 February 2017, Telenor India announced that Bharti Airtel will take over all its business and assets in India and deal will be completed in 12 months timeframe. On 14 May 2018, Department of Telecom approved the merger of Telenor India with Bharti Airtel paving the way for final commercial closing of the merger between the two companies. Telenor India has been acquired by Airtel almost without any cost.

On 12 October 2017, Bharti Airtel announced that it would acquire the consumer mobile businesses of Tata Teleservices Ltd (TTSL) and Tata Teleservices Maharastra Ltd (TTML) in a debt-free cash-free deal. The deal was essentially free for Airtel which incurred TTSL's unpaid spectrum payment liability. TTSL will continue to operate its enterprise, fixed line and broadband businesses and its stake in tower company Viom Networks. The consumer mobile businesses of Tata Docomo, Tata Teleservices (TTSL) and Tata Teleservices Maharashtra Limited (TTML) have been merged into Bharti Airtel from 1 July 2019

Reliance Communications had to shut down its 2G and 3G services including all voice services and only offer 4G data services from 29 December 2017, as a result of debt and a failed merger with Aircel. Surprisingly, the shut down was shortly after completion of acquisition of MTS India on 31 October 2017. In February 2019, the company filed for bankruptcy as it was unable to sell assets to repay its debt. It has an estimated debt of ₹ 57,383 crore against assets worth ₹18,000 crore.

Aircel shut down its operations in unprofitable circles including, Gujarat, Maharashtra, Haryana, Himachal Pradesh, Madhya Pradesh and Uttar Pradesh (West) from 30 January 2018. Aircel along with its units - Aircel Cellular and Dishnet Wireless - on 1 March 2018, filed for bankruptcy in the National Companies Law Tribunal (NCLT) in Mumbai due to huge competition and high levels of debt.

Vodafone and Idea Cellular completed their merger on 31 August 2018, and the merged entity is renamed to Vi. The merger created the largest telecom company in India by subscribers and by revenue, and the second largest mobile network in terms of number of subscribers in the world. Under the terms of the deal, the Vodafone Group holds a 45.1% stake in the combined entity, the Aditya Birla Group holds 26% and the remaining shares will be held by the public. However, even after the merger both the brands have been continued to carry their own independent brands.

With all this consolidation, the Indian mobile market has turned into a four-player market, with Jio as the number-one player, with revenue market share of 34%, Airtel India in second position, with revenue market share of 28% and Vi, with revenue market share of 27%. The government operator BSNL/MTNL is in the distant 4th position, with an approximate market share of 11%

== Wireless operators ==
As of 31.07.2026 there were around 1306.27 million wireless subscribers in India, according to Telecom Regulatory Authority of India (TRAI).

Market share of wireless mobile operators in India as of 31.07.2026, according to the Telecom Regulatory Authority of India (TRAI)
1. Jio (39.3%)
2. Airtel (38.0%)
3. Vodafone Idea (15.5%)
4. BSNL (7.24%)

=== Mobile operators ===
Over the past decade, the Indian cellular services market has seen rapid consolidation. The launch of Jio Platforms in 2016 changed the market dynamics substantially as the company offered free data and voice services during its first year of operations, prompting a fierce price war in the market. Jio managed to garner over 8 crore (80 million) subscribers. In 2018, Airtel India lost its market leadership position for the first time in 15 years as a result of the completion of a merger between then telecom giants Vodafone India and Idea Cellular.

==== Active operators ====
List of active mobile operators in the country (as on 31.07.2026)
Operator (estd.)	Brands	Total subscribers (million)	Active subscribers (million)	Technologies	Ownership	Notes
Jio (2016)	Jio	506.03	500.08	5G (VoNR), 4G (VoLTE, VoWiFi)	Jio Platforms (100%)	Not to be confused with Reliance Communications.
Airtel (1995)	Airtel	489.49	485.19	5G(VoNR for postpaid), 4G (VoLTE, VoWiFi), 2G	Bharti Enterprises (66.57) Singtel (32.15) Google (1.28%)	The 'airtel' brand is operated by Bharti Hexacom Limited in Rajasthan and North-East India. Bharti Airtel owns 70% of Bharti Hexacom, while TCIL (Government of India) owns the remaining 30%. Subscriber count and active users include Bharti Hexacom.
Vi (2018)	Vi	199.06	167.15	5G (Some Cities), 4G (VoLTE, VoWiFi), 2G	Government of India (49%); Vodafone Group (16%); Aditya Birla Group (9.5%); Public Shareholding (25.5%)	In February 2023, the Government of India converted ₹16,133 crore (~US$1.9 billion) debt owed to it by the operator into equity, after the company opted for the option given to it under a 'telecom reforms package'.
BSNL (2000)	BSNL	93.18	51.27	4G (VoLTE, VoWiFi), 3G,2G	Government of India (100%)	BSNL (VNOs) operates all over India. BSNL has excellent network coverage in many states of India. BSNL is installing more towers to improve network across India. BSNL provides cheapest recharge plans in entire telecom industry.

==== Defunct operators ====
As of 4 September 2026, 17 mobile operators have ceased operations in India. The longest operating defunct operator is MTNL which was also the first mobile operator in the country.

List of notable mobile operators that provided services in the country (as on 4 September 2026)
Operator	Started operations	Ceased operations	Fate
Modi Telstra	1995	2000	Merged into Axiata
Escotel	1996	2004	Merged into Idea Cellular
S Tel	2008	2012	Licence cancelled by the Supreme Court of India
Etisalat	2010	2012	Licence cancelled by the Supreme Court of India
Loop Mobile	1995	2014	Ceased operations after expiration of licence
Virgin Mobile / T24 Mobile	2009	2015	Merged into Tata DoCoMo
Axiata	1995	2016	Merged into Idea Cellular
Videocon Telecom	2010	2016	Shut down following sale of spectrum to Airtel
Singtel	2009	2017	Acquired by Airtel
MTS	2009	2017	Acquired by Reliance Communications
Aircel	1999	2018	Bankrupt
Telenor	2006	2018	Acquired by Airtel
Idea Cellular	2002	2018	Merged with Vodafone India to form Vodafone Idea
Vodafone India	2011	2018	Merged with Idea Cellular to form Vodafone Idea
Tata DoCoMo	2009	2019	Acquired by Airtel
Reliance Communications	2004	2019	Declared bankruptcy, subsequently acquired by Jio
MTNL	1986	2025	Merged into BSNL

== Wireline operators ==
=== Fixed-line operators ===
As of 31.07.2026, there are 48.01 million wireline subscribers in India according to Telecom Regulatory Authority of India (TRAI).

Market share of fixed-line telecom operators in India as of 31.07.2026, according to the Telecom Regulatory Authority of India
1. Jio (32.9%)
2. Airtel (25.3%)
3. BSNL (13.8%)
4. Tata Teleservices (23.0%)
5. MTNL (2.36%)
6. Others (2.71%)

The number of subscribers of all 10 companies are tabulated as follows:

Operator	Subscribers (lakh)	Ownership
Jio	157.91	Jio Platforms
Tata Teleservices	110.31	Tata Group
Airtel	121.54	Bharti Airtel
BSNL	66.48	Government of India
MTNL	10.84	Government of India
Vi	7.61	Vodafone Group Aditya Birla Group
APSFL	0.83	Andhra Pradesh Government
Quadrant	3.24	Videocon Telecom
Reliance Communications	0.75	Reliance Group
STPL	0.58	Sudhana Telecommunications Private Limited

== Internet service providers (ISPs) ==
Internet service providers (ISPs) offering broadband (wired + wireless) services. The total number of broadband subscribers stood at 1094.48 million as of 31.07.2026. Total Wireless broadband subscribers stood at 1046.34 million and wireline broadband subscribers stood at 48.14 million.

Market share of broadband (wired + wireless) services in India as of 31.07.2026, according to the Telecom Regulatory Authority of India (TRAI)
1. Jio (48.9%)
2. Airtel (35.1%)
3. Vi (11.9%)
4. BSNL (2.49%)
5. ACT (0.23%)
6. Others (1.41%)

As of 31.07.2026, the top five wireless broadband service providers which have market share of 99.99% is as follows:

Operator	Subscribers (million)	Ownership
Jio	520.44	Jio Platforms
Airtel	372.94	Bharti Airtel
Vi	129.95	Vodafone Group Aditya Birla Group
BSNL	22.74	Government of India
IBus Virtual Network Services Private Limited	0.12	

The following table shows the top five wired broadband service providers in India by total subscriber base as of 31.07.2026 which hold market share of 71.71%.

Provider	Subscribers (million)	Ownership
JioFiber	14.69	Jio Platforms
Airtel Xtream Fiber	11.28	Bharti Airtel
BSNL	4.53	Government of India
ACT	2.47	India Value Fund Advisors TA Associates
KVBL	1.55	

=== Other notable ISPs ===
Provider	Ownership
APSFL	Government of Andhra Pradesh
Asianet Broadband	Rajan Raheja Group
DEN Networks	Reliance Industries
Hathway	Reliance Industries
RailTel	Government of India
Sify	Sify Group
Tata Play	Tata Group (70%); The Walt Disney Company India (30%)
Excitel	

=== For enterprise/wholesale only ===
Provider	Ownership
CtrlS Datacenters	CtrlS Labs
ERNET	Ministry of Electronics and Information Technology
GAILTEL	Government of India
National Knowledge Network (for educational institutions only)	Government of India
PowerTel	Government of India
Tulip Telecom	Tulip Enterprises

== Television broadcasting ==
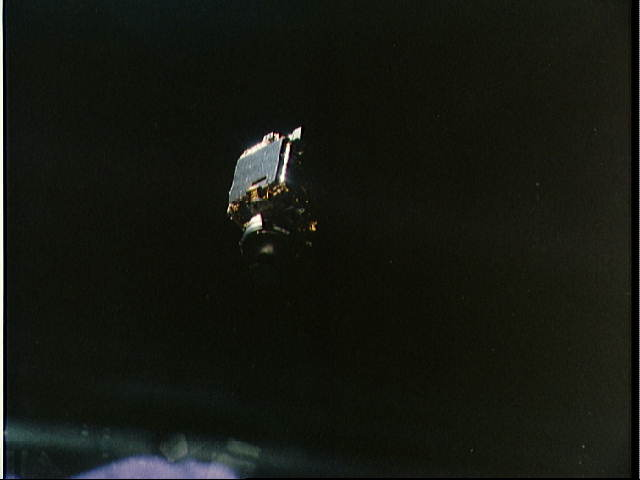
INSAT-1B satellite: Broadcasting sector in India is highly dependent on INSAT system.

Television broadcasting began in India in 1959 by Doordarshan, a state-run medium of communication, and had slow expansion for more than two decades. The policy reforms of the government in the 1990s attracted private initiatives in this sector, and since then, satellite television has increasingly shaped popular culture and Indian society. However, still, only the government-owned Doordarshan has the licence for terrestrial television broadcast. Private companies reach the public using satellite channels; both cable television as well as DTH has obtained a wide subscriber base in India.

A total of approximately 918 private satellite TV channels have been permitted by the Ministry of Information and Broadcasting (MIB) for uplinking only/downlinking only/both uplinking & downlinking.

As per the reporting done by broadcasters in pursuance of the Tariff Order dated 3rd March 2017, as amended, out of 908 permitted satellite TV channels which are available for downlinking in India, there are 333 satellite pay TV channels as on 31st March, 2025. Out of 333 pay channels, 232 are SD satellite pay TV channels and 101 are HD satellite pay TV channels.

== Radio ==
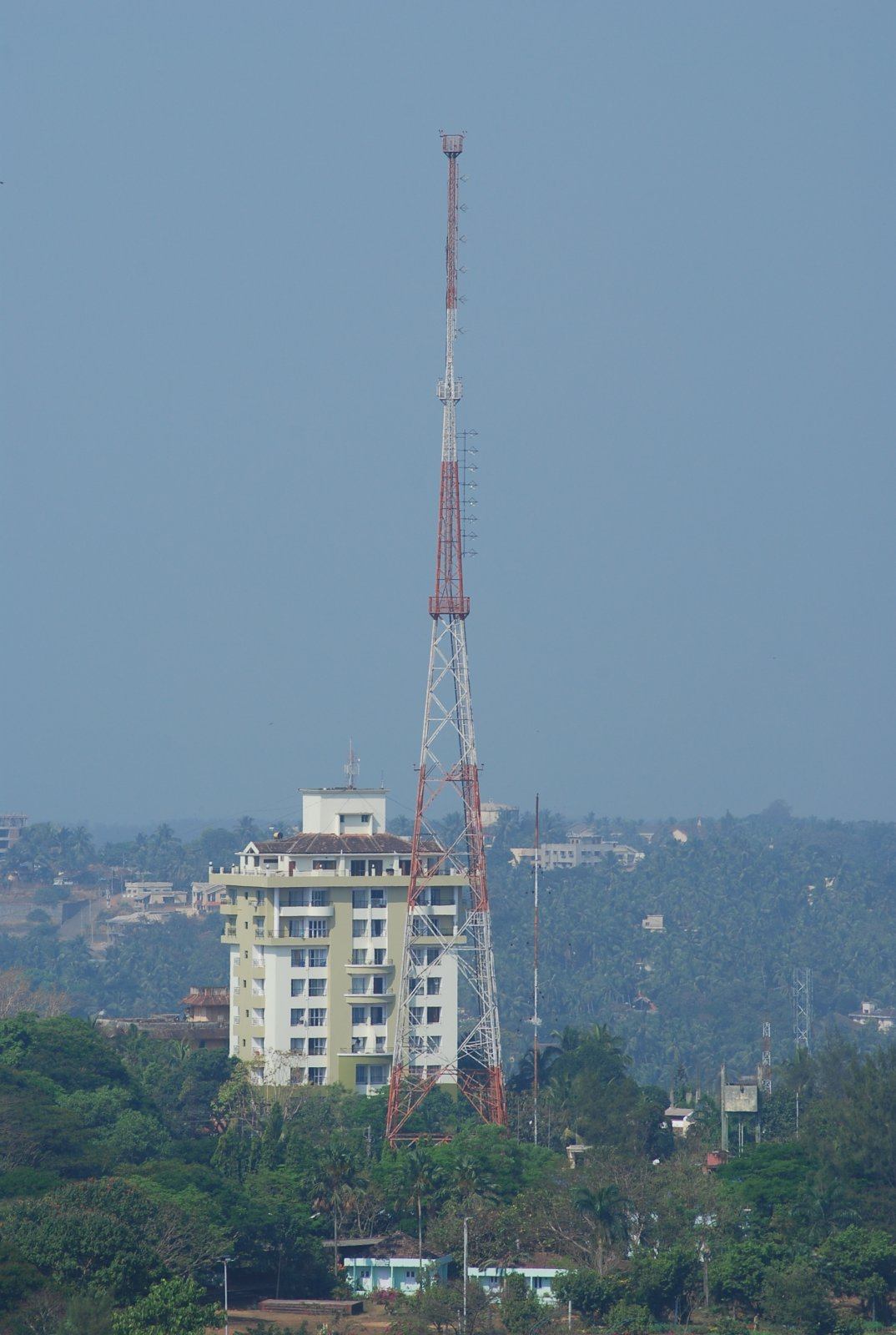
AIR Radio Tower

FM radio stations in India.

Apart from the radio channels operated by All India Radio – the public broadcaster, as per the data reported by FM Radio operators to TRAI, as on 31st December 2024, there were 388 operational private FM Radio channels in 113 cities operated by 36 private FM Radio operators. During the quarter ending 31st March 2025, six channels operated by three private FM radio operators, namely, (i) Digital Radio (Delhi) Broadcasting Ltd (3 channels), (ii) Digital Radio (Mumbai) Broadcasting Ltd (2 channels), and (iii) Digital Radio (Kolkata) Broadcasting Ltd (1 channel), were merged with South Asia FM Ltd. Now, as of 31st March 2025, there are 388 operational private FM radio channels across 113 cities, operated by 33 private FM radio operators.

== Next-generation networks (NGN) ==
Historically, the role of telecommunication has evolved from that of plain information exchange to a multi-service field, with Value Added Services (VAS) integrated with various discrete networks like PSTN, PLMN, Internet Backbone etc. However, with decreasing average revenue per user and increasing demand for VAS has become a compelling reason for the service providers to think of the convergence of these parallel networks into a single core network with service layers separated from network layer. Next-generation networking is such a convergence concept which according to ITU-T is:

A next-generation network (NGN) is a packet-based network which can provide services including Telecommunication Services and able to make use of multiple broadband, quality of service-enabled transport technologies and in which service-related functions are independent from underlying transport-related technologies. It offers unrestricted access by users to different service providers. It supports generalised mobility which will allow the consistent and ubiquitous provision of services to users.

Access network: The user can connect to the IP-core of NGN in various ways, most of which use the standard Internet Protocol (IP). User terminals such as mobile phones, personal digital assistants (PDAs) and computers can register directly on NGN-core, even when they are roaming in another network or country. The only requirement is that they can use IP and Session Initiation Protocol (SIP). Fixed access (e.g., digital subscriber line (DSL), cable modems, Ethernet), mobile access (e.g. UMTS, CDMA2000, GSM, GPRS) and wireless access (e.g.WLAN, WiMAX) are all supported. Other phone systems like plain old telephone service and non-compatible VoIP systems, are supported through gateways. With the deployment of the NGN, users may subscribe to many simultaneous access-providers providing telephony, internet or entertainment services. This may provide end-users with virtually unlimited options to choose between service providers for these services in NGN environment.

The hyper-competition in the telecom market, which was effectively caused by the introduction of Universal Access Service (UAS) licence in 2003 became much tougher after 3G and 4G competitive auction. About 670,000 route-kilometres (420,000 mi) of optical fibre has been laid in India by the major operators, including in the financially nonviable rural areas and the process continues. Keeping in mind the viability of providing services in rural areas, the government of India also took a proactive role to promote the NGN implementation in the country; an expert committee called NGN eCO was constituted in order to deliberate on the licensing, interconnection and quality of service (QoS) issues related to NGN and it submitted its report on 24 August 2007. Telecom operators found the NGN model advantageous, but huge investment requirements have prompted them to adopt a multi-phase migration and they have already started the migration process to NGN with the implementation of IP-based core-network.

== Regulatory environment ==
LIRNEasia's Telecommunications Regulatory Environment (TRE) index, which summarises stakeholders' perception on certain TRE dimensions, provides insight into how conducive the environment is for further development and progress. The most recent survey was conducted in July 2008 in eight Asian countries, including Bangladesh, India, Indonesia, Sri Lanka, Maldives, Pakistan, Thailand, and the Philippines. The tool measured seven dimensions: i) market entry; ii) access to scarce resources; iii) interconnection; iv) tariff regulation; v) anti-competitive practices; and vi) universal services; vii) quality of service, for the fixed, mobile and broadband sectors.

The results for India, point out to the fact that the stakeholders perceive the TRE to be most conducive for the mobile sector followed by fixed and then broadband. Other than for Access to ScarceResources the fixed sector lags behind the mobile sector. The fixed and mobile sectors have the highest scores for Tariff Regulation. Market entry also scores well for the mobile sector as competition is well entrenched with most of the circles with 4–5 mobile service providers. The broadband sector has the lowest score in the aggregate. The low penetration of broadband of mere 3.87 against the policy objective of 9 million at the end of 2007 clearly indicates that the regulatory environment is not very conducive.

In 2013 the home ministry stated that legislation must ensure that law enforcement agencies are empowered to intercept communications.

== S-band spectrum scam ==
In India, electromagnetic spectrum, being a scarce resource for wireless communication, is auctioned by the Government of India to telecom companies for use. As an example of its value, in 2010, 20 Hertz of 3G spectrum was auctioned for ₹677 billion (US$7.2 billion). This part of the spectrum is allocated for terrestrial communication (cell phones). However, in January 2005, Antrix Corporation (commercial arm of ISRO) signed an agreement with Devas Multimedia (a private company formed by former ISRO employees and venture capitalists from USA) for lease of S band transponders (amounting to 70 MHz of spectrum) on two ISRO satellites (GSAT 6 and GSAT 6A) for a price of ₹14 billion (US$150 million), to be paid over a period of 12 years. The spectrum used in these satellites (2500 MHz and above) is allocated by the International Telecommunication Union specifically for satellite-based communication in India. Hypothetically, if the spectrum allocation is changed for utilisation for terrestrial transmission and if this 70 MHz of spectrum were sold at the 2010 auction price of the 3G spectrum, its value would have been over ₹2,000 billion (US$21 billion). This was a hypothetical situation. However, the Comptroller and Auditor General of India considered this hypothetical situation and estimated the difference between the prices as a loss to the Indian Government.

There were lapses on implementing Government of India procedures. Antrix/ISRO had allocated the capacity of the above two satellites to Devas Multimedia on an exclusive basis, while rules said it should always be non-exclusive. The Union Council of Ministers was misinformed in November 2005 that several service providers were interested in using satellite capacity, while the Devas deal was already signed. Also, the Space Commission was kept in the dark while taking approval for the second satellite (its cost was diluted so that Cabinet approval was not needed). ISRO committed to spending ₹7.66 billion (US$82 million) of public money on building, launching, and operating two satellites that were leased out for Devas.

In late 2009, some ISRO insiders exposed information about the Devas-Antrix deal, and the ensuing investigations resulted in the deal being annulled. G. Madhavan Nair (ISRO Chairperson when the agreement was signed) was barred from holding any post under the Department of Space. Some former scientists were found guilty of "acts of commission" or "acts of omission". Devas and Deutsche Telekom demanded US$2 billion and US$1 billion, respectively, in damages.

The Central Bureau of Investigation concluded investigations into the Antrix-Devas scam and registered a case against the accused in the Antrix-Devas deal under Section 120-B, besides Section 420 of IPC and Section 13(2) read with 13(1)(d) of PC Act, 1988 on 18 March 2015 against the then executive director of Antrix Corporation, two officials of USA-based company, Bangalore based private multimedia company, and other unknown officials of Antrix Corporation or Department of Space.

Devas Multimedia started arbitration proceedings against Antrix in June 2011. In September 2015, the International Court of Arbitration of the International Chamber of Commerce ruled in favour of Devas, and directed Antrix to pay US$672 million (Rs 44.35 billion) in damages to Devas. Antrix opposed the Devas plea for tribunal award in the Delhi High Court.

== Revenue and growth ==
The adjusted gross revenue in the telecom service sector was ₹160,814 crore (equivalent to ₹2.5 trillion or US$26.3 billion in 2026) in 2017 as against ₹198,207 crore (equivalent to ₹3.1 trillion or US$33.2 billion in 2026) in 2016, registering a negative growth of 18.87%. The major contributions to this revenue are as follows (in INR crores):

Service provider	Calendar year 2018-19 (in INR crores)	Calendar year 2019-20 (in INR crores)	% change	Q2 2020-21 (in INR crores)
Airtel	80,780.2	87,539.0	+08.37%	--
Reliance Jio	48,660	68,462	+40.69%	--
Vi	37,823.6	45,996.8	+21.68%	--
BSNL	19,308	18,906	-02.08%	--
Note: Bharti Airtel acquired Telenor India in May 2018 and the data of Airtel and Telenor India has been merged.; On 31 August 2018, Vodafone and Idea merged to form the world's second-largest telecom company, and the largest in India, officially known as Vi and both the companies' data has been merged.; On 1 November 2017, MTS India merged with Reliance Communications and their data has been merged.; Videocon shut down its network and discontinued operations in the Gujarat and UP (West) circles on 26 December 2015, and in the Haryana, Madhya Pradesh, Bihar and UP (East) circles on 11 May 2016.; Reliance Communications discontinued its wireless voice services on 29 December 2017, but continued its data and B2B services until 2018. Reliance Communications filed for bankruptcy as it was unable to sell its assets to Jio and closed its operations under mobile network division on 26 February 2019.; On 28 February 2018 Aircel filed for bankruptcy at NCLT and has discontinued operations.; Quadrant discontinued its wireless mobile services in April 2017; however, it has continued to provide wired line services in Punjab circle.; In July 2016, Virgin Mobile India and T24 Mobile merged their virtual network operations into Tata Docomo.; Bharti Airtel acquired the consumer mobile businesses of Tata Teleservices which include Tata Docomo in a debt-free deal on 1 July 2019.

== International ==
- Nine satellite earth stations – 8 Intelsat (Indian Ocean) and 1 Inmarsat (Indian Ocean region).
- Nine gateway exchanges operating from Mumbai, New Delhi, Kolkata, Chennai, Jalandhar, Kanpur, Gandhinagar, Hyderabad and Thiruvananthapuram.

=== Submarine cables ===
- LOCOM linking Chennai to Penang, Malaysia
- India-UAE cable linking Mumbai to Fujairah, UAE.
- SEA-ME-WE 2 (South East Asia-Middle East-Western Europe 2)
- SEA-ME-WE 3 (South East Asia-Middle East-Western Europe 3) – Landing sites at Kochi and Mumbai. Capacity of 960 Gbit/s.
- SEA-ME-WE 4 (South East Asia-Middle East-Western Europe 4) – Landing sites at Mumbai and Chennai. Capacity of 1.28 Tbit/s.
- Fibre-optic Link Around the Globe (FLAG-FEA) with a landing site at Mumbai (2000). Initial design capacity 10 Gbit/s, upgraded in 2002 to 80 Gbit/s, upgraded to over 1 Tbit/s (2005).
- TIISCS (Tata Indicom India-Singapore Cable System), also known as TIC (Tata Indicom Cable), Chennai to Singapore. Capacity of 5.12 Tbit/s.
- i2i – Chennai to Singapore. The capacity of 8.4 Tbit/s.
- SEACOM From Mumbai to the Mediterranean, via South Africa. It joins with SEA-ME-WE 4 off the west coast of Spain to carry traffic onward to London (2009). Capacity of 1.28 Tbit/s.
- I-ME-WE (India-Middle East-Western Europe) with two landing sites at Mumbai (2009). Capacity of 3.84 Tbit/s.
- EIG (Europe-India Gateway), landing at Mumbai(2011). Capacity of 3.84 Tbit/s.
- TGN-Eurasia Landing at Mumbai (2012), Capacity of 1.28 Tbit/s
- TGN-Gulf Landing at Mumbai (2012), Capacity Unknown.
- MENA (Middle East North Africa)(Announced).(due ?), Capacity of 5.76 Tbit/s.

== See also ==
- Industry
  - TRAI
  - Electronics and semiconductor manufacturing industry in India
  - Indian Telecom Spectrum Auction
- Services
  - Common Service Centres
  - Digital India
  - Internet in India
  - Over-the-top media services in India
  - Indian Telecommunication Service
  - Mobile telephone numbering in India
- Lists
  - List of countries by number of broadband Internet subscriptions
  - List of countries by number of Internet users
  - List of countries by Internet connection speeds
  - List of countries by smartphone penetration
  - List of mobile phone brands by country
  - List of telecom companies in India
