= List of internet service providers in India =

This is a list of internet service providers in India. There were 1076 internet service providers (ISPs) offering broadband and narrowband internet services in India as of 30 June 2023.

== By subscribers ==
Broadband is defined by the Telecom Regulatory Authority of India as "an always-on data connection ... that offers a minimum downlink and uplink speed of 2 Mbit/s". The number of internet users is 895.832 million, out of whom 34.36 million are narrowband subscribers and 861.472 million are broadband subscribers. The following table shows the top 5 ISPs in India by total subscriber base as of 30 June 2023.

Rank	ISP	Logo	Subscribers		
Rank	ISP	Logo	Narrowband	Broadband	Total
1	Jio		—N/a	428,200,000	428,200,000
2	Airtel		19,969,265	268,028,831	287,998,096
3	Vi		11,043,432	124,896,076	135,939,508
4	BSNL		2,882,539	24,588,532	27,471,071
5	ACT Fibernet		—N/a	2,159,293	2,159,293
6	Hathway		—N/a	—N/a	—N/a
7	Excitel Broadband		—N/a	—N/a	—N/a

Note:

1. On 28 February 2018 Aircel filed for bankruptcy at NCLT and a substantial number of customers have migrated to other services due to closing down of most of the consumer services.
2. The services of Telenor India has been merged with Airtel on 14 May 2018.
3. On 31 August 2018, Vodafone India has been merged with Idea Cellular and renamed as Vodafone Idea.

== List ==
Service Provider	Internet Connection Type(s)	Region(s) Served	Parent/owner	Notes	Ref
Atria Convergence Technologies	FTTH	—N/a			
BSNL Broadband	FTTH	India			
DEN Networks	—N/a	—N/a			
Excitel Broadband	FTTH	Delhi, Mumbai, Rajasthan, Uttar Pradesh			
MTNL Broadband	FTTH	Delhi, Mumbai			
Hathway	FTTH	India			
Tikona	—N/a	—N/a			
Siti Networks					

== Other notable ISPs ==
ISP	Coverage area
Railtel	Public Sector (state-owned) ISP with pan-India optic fiber network along Railway track

== Enterprise/wholesale only ==
- National Knowledge Network for educational institutions in India
- PowerGrid

== See also ==
- List of telecom companies in India
- Internet in India
