= List of telecom companies in India =

Telecom services providing companies in India are regulated by Department of Telecommunications and TRAI which comes under Ministry of Communications, Government of India.

== Direct-to-home (DTH) operators ==
There are 4 pay-for-use DTH service providers and one free-to-air service provider (DD Free Dish) in India.

As of 31.03.2026, there are 49.05 million active DTH subscribers, in addition to the subscribers of state-owned DD Free Dish, in the country according to Telecom Regulatory Authority of India (TRAI).

Market share of pay DTH operators in India as of 31 March 2026, according to the Telecom Regulatory Authority of India (TRAI)
1. Tata Play (30.9%)
2. Airtel Digital TV (28.4%)
3. Dish TV (19.1%)
4. Sun Direct (21.6%)

Operator	Market share	Ownership
Tata Play	30.92%	Tata Group (70%); Disney India (30%)
Airtel Digital TV	28.36%	Bharti Airtel (100%)
Dish TV	19.11%	Publicly owned (95.96%)
Sun Direct	21.61%	Sun TV Network (80%); Astro (20%)
DD Free Dish		Ministry of Information and Broadcasting (100%)

Notes

- DD Free Dish is a free-to-air service; hence, their subscriber data is not shown in the TRAI performance report.

=== Multiple-system operators (MSOs) ===
As of 31 March 2026, there are 752 MSO and 2 HITS operators

List of top MSOs by subscribers

No	Operator	Total active subscriber base
1	GTPL Hathway Ltd	71,62,192
2	Hathway Digital Ltd	51,74,077
3	Siti Networks Ltd	48,10,710
4	Thamizhaga Cable TV Communication Pvt Ltd. (TCCL)	38,03,451
5	Kerala Communicators Cable Ltd (KCCL)	36,48,628
6	Den Networks Ltd	32,52,764
7	NXT Digital Ltd (HITS)	24,39,067
8	KAL Cables	19,50,373
9	V K Digital Network Pvt. Ltd	15,60,585
10	Tamil Nadu Arasu Cable TV Corporation Ltd (TACTV)	14,78,718
11	Fastway Transmissions Pvt Ltd	13,15,751
12	NXT Digital Ltd (CATV)	12,33,233

== Wireless operators ==
As of 31.08.2026 there were around 1312.25 million wireless subscribers in India, according to Telecom Regulatory Authority of India (TRAI).

Market share of wireless mobile operators in India as of 31.07.2026, according to the Telecom Regulatory Authority of India (TRAI)
1. Jio (39.3%)
2. Airtel (38.0%)
3. Vodafone Idea (15.4%)
4. BSNL (7.25%)

=== Mobile operators ===
Over the past decade, the Indian cellular services market has seen rapid consolidation. The launch of Jio Platforms in 2016 changed the market dynamics substantially as the company offered free data and voice services during its first year of operations, prompting a fierce price war in the market. Jio managed to garner over 8 crore (80 million) subscribers. In 2018, Airtel India lost its market leadership position for the first time in 15 years as a result of the completion of a merger between then telecom giants Vodafone India and Idea Cellular.

==== Active operators ====
List of active mobile operators in the country (as on 31.08.2026)
Operator (estd.)	Brands	Total subscribers (million)	Active subscribers (million)	Technologies	Ownership	Notes
Jio (2016)	Jio	508.43	502.33	5G (VoNR), 4G (VoLTE, VoWiFi)	Jio Platforms (100%)	The 'Jio' brand is operated by Reliance Industries.
Airtel (1995)	Airtel	491.60	486.76	5G(VoNR for postpaid), 4G (VoLTE, VoWiFi), 2G	Bharti Enterprises (66.57) Singtel (32.15) Alphabet Inc. (1.28%)	The 'airtel' brand is operated by Bharti Hexacom Limited in Rajasthan and North-East India. Bharti Airtel owns 70% of Bharti Hexacom, while TCIL (Government of India) owns the remaining 30%. Subscriber count and active users include Bharti Hexacom.
Vi (2018)	Vi	199.57	167.32	5G (Some Cities), 4G (VoLTE, VoWiFi), 2G	Government of India (49%); Vodafone Group (16%); Aditya Birla Group (9.5%); Public Shareholding (25.5%)	In February 2023, the Government of India converted ₹16,133 crore (~US$1.9 billion) debt owed to it by the operator into equity, after the company opted for the option given to it under a 'telecom reforms package'.
BSNL Mobile (2000)	BSNL	93.67	50.93	4G (VoLTE, VoWiFi), 3G,2G	Government of India (100%)	BSNL (VNOs) operates all over India. BSNL has excellent network coverage in many states of India. BSNL is installing more towers to improve network across India. BSNL provides cheapest recharge plans in entire telecom industry.

==== Defunct operators ====
As of 28 September 2026, 17 mobile operators have ceased operations in India. The longest operating defunct operator is MTNL which was also the first mobile operator in the country.

List of notable mobile operators that provided services in the country (as on 28 September 2026)
Operator	Started operations	Ceased operations	Fate
Modi Telstra	1995	2000	Merged into Axiata
Escotel	1996	2004	Merged into Idea Cellular
S Tel	2008	2012	Licence cancelled by the Supreme Court of India
Etisalat	2010	2012	Licence cancelled by the Supreme Court of India
Loop Mobile	1995	2014	Ceased operations after expiration of licence
Virgin Mobile / T24 Mobile	2009	2015	Merged into Tata DoCoMo
Axiata	1995	2016	Merged into Idea Cellular
Videocon Telecom	2010	2016	Shut down following sale of spectrum to Bharti Airtel
Singtel	2009	2017	Acquired by Airtel
MTS	2009	2017	Acquired by Reliance Communications
Aircel	1999	2018	Bankrupt
Telenor	2006	2018	Acquired by Airtel
Idea Cellular	2002	2018	Merged with Vodafone India to form Vodafone Idea
Vodafone India	2011	2018	Merged with Idea Cellular to form Vodafone Idea
Tata DoCoMo	2009	2019	Acquired by Bharti Airtel
Reliance Communications	2004	2018	Declared bankruptcy, subsequently acquired by Jio
MTNL	1986	2025	Merged into BSNL

== Wireline operators ==
=== Fixed-line operators ===
As of 31.08.2026, there are 48.48 million wireline subscribers in India according to Telecom Regulatory Authority of India (TRAI).

Market share of fixed-line telecom operators in India as of 31.08.2026, according to the Telecom Regulatory Authority of India
1. Jio (33.0%)
2. Airtel (25.4%)
3. BSNL (13.7%)
4. Tata Teleservices (23.0%)
5. MTNL (2.17%)
6. Others (2.66%)

The number of subscribers of all 10 companies are tabulated as follows:

Operator	Subscribers (lakh)	Ownership
Jio	159.79	Jio Platforms
Airtel	122.85	Bharti Airtel
Tata Teleservices	112.02	Tata Group
BSNL	66.50	Government of India
MTNL	10.50	Government of India
Vi	7.54	Vodafone Group Aditya Birla Group
APSFL	0.78	Government of Andhra Pradesh
Quadrant	3.24	Videocon Telecom
Reliance Communications	0.75	Reliance Group
STPL	0.58	Sudhana Telecommunications Private Limited

== Internet service providers (ISPs) ==
Internet service providers (ISPs) offering broadband (wired + wireless) services. The total number of broadband subscribers stood at 1101.21 million as of 31.08.2026. Total Wireless broadband subscribers stood at 1052.58 million and wireline broadband subscribers stood at 48.63 million.

Market share of broadband (wired + wireless) services in India as of 31.08.2026, according to the Telecom Regulatory Authority of India (TRAI)
1. Jio (48.9%)
2. Airtel (35.1%)
3. Vi (11.9%)
4. BSNL (2.53%)
5. ACT (0.23%)
6. Others (1.42%)

As of 31.08.2026, the top five wired + wireless broadband service providers which have market share of 98.58% is as follows:

Operator	Subscribers (million)	Ownership
Jio	538.03	Jio Platforms
Airtel	386.39	Bharti Airtel
Vi	130.88	Vodafone Group Aditya Birla Group
BSNL	27.82	Government of India
Atria Convergence Technologies Limited	2.48	

=== Other notable ISPs ===
Provider	Ownership
Apsfl	Government of Andhra Pradesh
Asianet Broadband	Rajan Raheja Group
Kerala Vision Broadband	Kerala Communicatiors Cable Limited (KCCL)
Den Networks	Reliance Industries
Hathway	Reliance Industries
Railtel	Government of India
Sify	Sify Group
Tata Play Fiber	Tata Group (70%); Disney India (30%)
Excitel	

=== For enterprise/wholesale only ===
Provider	Ownership
CtrlS Datacenters	CtrlS Labs
ERNET	Ministry of Electronics and Information Technology
Gailtel	Government of India
National Knowledge Network (for educational institutions only)	Government of India
Powertel	Government of India
Tulip Telecom	Tulip Enterprises

== Telecom R&D firms ==
Name	Headquarters	Type
Beetel	Gurugram	Private
C-DOT	New Delhi	State-owned enterprise
HFCL	Gurugram	Private
Sasken Technologies	Bengaluru	Private
Sterlite Technologies	Pune	Private
Tejas Networks	Bengaluru	Private
UTL	Bengaluru	State-owned enterprise

== See also ==
- Telecommunications in India
- List of mobile network operators
- Direct-to-home television in India
- List of mobile network operators in Asia and Oceania
- Internet in India
