= Indian Telecom Spectrum Auction =

Telecom spectrum auction in India

In India, the Department of Telecommunications (DoT) conducts auctions of licenses for electromagnetic spectrum. India was among the early adopters of spectrum auctions beginning auctions in 1994.

== Overview ==
A telecom company that wishes to offer services in any of the 22 telecom circles in India must purchase a Unified Access Services (UAS) license to operate that circle. Licences are awarded by auctions. The UAS, introduced in November 2003, is valid for a period of 20 years, which can be extended by an additional 10 years once per licence per circle. Initially, a mobile network operator that was awarded a licence to operate in any of the 22 telecom circles in India was allocated frequencies in that circle for a fixed time period. After the expiry of the license, the company would have to bid to renew the licence. A new telecom policy announced by the government in 2011, delinked spectrum from licences. As a result, when an operator renews its licence it must also pay separately for spectrum.

The first telecom spectrum auction in India was held in 1994. Auctions were held again in 1997, 2000, and 2001. Spectrum in the 900 MHz band was auctioned in all these years except 2001, while 1800 MHz band spectrum was auctioned for the first time in 2001. Following the 2001 auction, the government abandoned the practice of auctions in favour of an administrative allocation model. Under this model, the government would select companies that it deemed were best equipped to develop India's telecom infrastructure. The final allocation of 900 MHz took place in 2004, through the new model. This policy resulted in spectrum being allocated at far lower prices than had been done through auctions. For example, Reliance had paid ₹ 12.25 crore and ₹ 58.49 crore in 1995 for 4.4 MHz spectrum in West Bengal and Orissa respectively. In 2004, Airtel was allocated the same amount of spectrum in the same circles for ₹ 1 crore and ₹ 4.4 crore respectively.

In 2008, 122 new 2G UAS licenses were granted to telecom companies on a first-come, first-served basis at the 2001 price. According to the Central Bureau of Investigation (CBI) charge sheet, several laws were violated and bribes paid to favour certain firms in granting 2G spectrum licenses. According to a CAG audit, licenses were granted to ineligible corporations, those with no experience in the telecom sector (such as Unitech and Swan Telecom) and those who had concealed relevant information. The Indian National Congress coalition government undercharged mobile telephone companies for frequency allocation licenses, which they then used to create 2G spectrum subscriptions for cell phones. The difference between the money collected and that mandated to be collected was estimated by the Comptroller and Auditor General of India at ₹1.76 trillion (US$18 billion), based on 2010 3G and BWA spectrum-auction prices. In a chargesheet filed on 2 April 2011 by the CBI, the loss was pegged at ₹309,845.5 million (US$3.2 billion).

On 2 February 2012, the Supreme Court of India ruled on a public interest litigation (PIL) related to the 2G spectrum case. The court declared the allotment of spectrum "unconstitutional and arbitrary", cancelling the 122 licenses issued in 2008 under A. Raja (Minister of Communications & IT from 2007 to 2009), the primary official accused. The court found that Raja "wanted to favour some companies at the cost of the public exchequer" and "virtually gifted away important national asset[s]." On 3 August 2012, after a Supreme Court directive, the Government of India revised the base price for 5-MHz 2G spectrum auctions to ₹140 billion (US$1.5 billion), raising its value to about ₹28 billion (US$290 million) per MHz (near the Comptroller and Auditor General estimate of ₹33.5 billion (US$350 million) per MHz).

== 1994 auction ==
The first auction was held in 1994. The government divided the country into 23 telecom circles and awarded licences and spectrum to two operators per circle. In the four metro circles - Chennai, Delhi, Kolkata and Mumbai - the DoT fixed several prerequisites for potential bidders to meet in order to be eligible for the auction. The criteria included financial resources, reliability, and investment in research, as well as specific details such as rate of network rollout, pricing, quality, and competitiveness.

== 1995 auction ==
The licences and spectrum for the remaining 19 telecom circles was auctioned and allocated in 1995. In these circles, the government required that all potential bidders must have foreign partner in order to be eligible. The government proceeded on the assumption that no Indian company, at the time, had the financial resources and technical knowledge to provide large scale mobile services.

Two blocks of 4.4 MHz from the 900 MHz band for GSM-based mobile services were auctioned in the 19 non-metro circles. However, the process exposed unforeseen problems with the design and rules of the auction. For instance, Koshika Telecom (operating under the brand name Usha Fone) was awarded multiple licences even though the licence fee was $15 billion while Koshika only had an annual turnover of $60 million. Concerns were also raised about the possibility of a monopoly if a single company secured multiple licences. In order to address this concern, the auction rules were altered to prohibit a single company from operating in more than 3 circles. The auction for the 900 MHz band was held again under the new rules.

== 1997 and 2000 auctions ==
Spectrum auctions were held again in 1997 and 2000. In 1997, state-owned MTNL was allocated 4.4 MHz of 900 MHz band spectrum to commence GSM services. Another state-owned operator BSNL was awarded spectrum in 2000.

== 2001 auction ==
The 2001 auction was the first time spectrum in a band other than 900 MHz was auctioned in India. The government auctioned spectrum in the 1800 MHz band using a three-stage auction process.

== 2010 Spectrum Auction ==
In 2010, 3G and 4G telecom spectrum were auctioned in a highly competitive bidding. The winners were awarded spectrum in September, and Tata Docomo was the first private operator to launch 3G services in India. The Government earned ₹677 billion (equivalent to ₹1.5 trillion or US$16 billion in 2023) from the 3G spectrum auction and the broadband wireless spectrum auction generated a revenue of ₹385 billion (equivalent to ₹860 billion or US$9.0 billion in 2023) for a total revenue of ₹1,062 billion (equivalent to ₹2.4 trillion or US$25 billion in 2023) from both auctions.

Participants

The private companies which participated in the auction were:

- Airtel
- Idea
- Reliance Communications
- S Tel
- Tata Teleservices
- Vodafone Essar

State-owned telecom companies BSNL and MTNL were also awarded spectrum, although they did not participate in the auction. BSNL paid the Indian government ₹ ₹101.87 billion (equivalent to ₹230 billion or US$2.4 billion in 2023) for spectrum in 20 circles and MTNL got spectrum for 3G services in 2 circles, Delhi and Mumbai.

Results

The auction took place over 34 days and consisted of 183 rounds of bidding. The most expensive telecom circle was Delhi at a price of ₹ 33169 million per operator. The five most expensive circles were Delhi, Mumbai, Karnataka, Tamil Nadu and Andhra Pradesh. They accounted for 65.56% of the total bids.

Circle	Vodafone	Bharti Airtel	Reliance	Tata DoCoMo	Idea	Aircel	S Tel	BSNL	MTNL	Total
Andhra Pradesh	X mark	check	X mark	X mark	check	check	X mark	check	X mark	4
Assam	X mark	check	check	X mark	X mark	check	X mark	check	X mark	4
Bihar	X mark	check	check	X mark	X mark	check	check	check	X mark	5
Delhi	check	check	check	X mark	X mark	X mark	X mark	X mark	check	4
Gujarat	check	X mark	X mark	check	check	X mark	X mark	check	X mark	4
Haryana	check	X mark	X mark	check	check	X mark	X mark	check	X mark	4
Himachal Pradesh	X mark	check	check	X mark	check	X mark	check	check	X mark	5
Jammu & Kashmir	X mark	check	check	X mark	check	check	X mark	check	X mark	5
Karnataka	X mark	check	X mark	check	X mark	check	X mark	check	X mark	4
Kerala	X mark	X mark	X mark	check	check	check	X mark	check	X mark	4
Kolkata	check	X mark	check	X mark	X mark	check	X mark	check	X mark	4
Madhya Pradesh	X mark	X mark	check	check	check	X mark	X mark	check	X mark	4
Maharashtra & Goa	check	X mark	X mark	check	check	X mark	X mark	check	X mark	4
Mumbai	check	check	check	X mark	X mark	X mark	X mark	X mark	check	4
North East	X mark	check	check	X mark	X mark	check	X mark	check	X mark	4
Orissa	X mark	X mark	check	X mark	X mark	check	check	check	X mark	4
Punjab	X mark	X mark	check	check	check	check	X mark	check	X mark	5
Rajasthan	X mark	check	check	check	X mark	X mark	X mark	check	X mark	4
Tamil Nadu	check	check	X mark	X mark	X mark	check	X mark	check	X mark	4
Uttar Pradesh (East)	check	X mark	X mark	X mark	check	check	X mark	check	X mark	4
Uttar Pradesh (West)	X mark	check	X mark	check	check	X mark	X mark	check	X mark	4
West Bengal	check	check	check	X mark	X mark	check	X mark	check	X mark	5
Total (22)	9	13	13	9	11	13	3	20	2	93

== 2012 Spectrum Auction ==
In 2012, the DoT auctioned 2G spectrum in both GSM and CDMA bands. The government put on sale 271.25 MHz of spectrum. The 1800 MHz band and 800 MHz band are currently being used for GSM and CDMA services respectively. Eleven blocks having 1.25 MHz each in the 1800 MHz frequency band were auctioned, except in Mumbai and Delhi where only eight blocks were available. Three of the eleven blocks, in each circle, were reserved for new telecom players or operators whose licences were cancelled by the Supreme Court on 2 February 2012, following the 2G spectrum case. New players and companies affected by the Supreme Court verdict will have to win at least 4 blocks in each circle to start or continue their operations in that circle. Existing players whose licences were not affected by the Supreme Court verdict can bid for only 2 blocks in each circle. This applies to all circles of Airtel and Vodafone, and in some circles for Idea.

Three blocks of 1.25 MHz frequency each in the 800 MHz band were also available for auction. Initially, only Videocon Telecommunications Limited and Tata Teleservices (Tata DoCoMo CDMA) had applied to participate in the auction for spectrum in 800 MHz band (CDMA). Both companies withdrew their applications before 5 November, the last date for withdrawal of applications. Videocon was announced as a pre-qualifier in the bidding process by the DoT on 29 October, but withdrew its application on 2 November. Tata Teleservices was also announced as a pre-qualifier on 29 October, but withdrew its bid later. The withdrawals meant that there were no bidders left and the CDMA spectrum auction was subsequently cancelled.

The final list of bidders was announced on 6 November. This was followed by a mock auction on 7 and 8 November and the e-auction of 1,800 MHz band began on 12 November.

Participants

The companies which participated in the auction for spectrum in 1800 MHz band (GSM) were:

- Airtel
- Idea
- Vodafone
- Videocon
- TATA
- Uninor

Results

The auction took place over 2 days (starting 12 November and ending 14 November) and consisted of 14 rounds. The government received bids worth a total of ₹94.07 billion (US$980 million), far lower than its target of ₹ 280 billion. No one bid on the India-wide spectrum, which had a reserve price of Rs 140 billion. Bids were tendered on 102 of the 140 blocks being offered. Delhi, Mumbai, Karnataka and Rajasthan circles did not receive any bids. Minister of Communications and Information Technology Kapil Sibal said of the unsold spectrum, "Of course there will be an auction. There is no doubt about that. What procedure we follow for that auction is something that we will decide in another few weeks."

Circle / Operator	Vodafone	Airtel	Uninor	Idea	Videocon
Assam	check	check	X mark	check	X mark
Andhra Pradesh	X mark	X mark	check	X mark	X mark
Bihar	check	X mark	check	check	check
Delhi	No bid				
Gujarat	X mark	X mark	check	X mark	check
Haryana	check	X mark	check	X mark	check
Himachal Pradesh	check	X mark	X mark	X mark	X mark
Jammu & Kashmir	check	X mark	X mark	check	X mark
Karnataka	No bid				
Kerala	check	X mark	X mark	X mark	X mark
Kolkata	X mark	X mark	check	check	X mark
Madhya Pradesh	check	X mark	X mark	X mark	check
Maharashtra & Goa	check	X mark	check	X mark	X mark
Mumbai	No bid				
Punjab	check	X mark	X mark	X mark	X mark
North East	check	X mark	X mark	check	X mark
Orissa	check	X mark	X mark	check	X mark
Rajasthan	No bid				
Tamil Nadu	X mark	X mark	X mark	check	X mark
Uttar Pradesh (East)	check	X mark	check	X mark	check
Uttar Pradesh (West)	check	X mark	check	X mark	check
West Bengal	check	X mark	X mark	check	X mark
No. of Circles	14	1	8	8	6
Total Amount (₹ crores)	1,127.94	8.67	4,928	2,031	2,221

== 2013 Spectrum Auction ==
Results of the 2013 spectrum auction
Circle	Price per block
Delhi	₹4,505 million (US$47 million)
Gujarat	₹1,462 million (US$15 million)
Karnataka	₹2,146 million (US$22 million)
Kerala	₹425 million (US$4.4 million)
Kolkata	₹739 million (US$7.7 million)
Maharashtra & Goa	No bid
Mumbai	No bid
Tamil Nadu	₹1,989.6 million (US$21 million)
Uttar Pradesh (East)	No bid
Uttar Pradesh (West)	₹698 million (US$7.2 million)
West Bengal	₹168 million (US$1.7 million)

In the 2013 spectrum auction, the Government planned to auction 50 MHz of airwaves in the 1800 MHz band and 76.25 MHz of spectrum in the 800 MHz band. The Government put CDMA spectrum worth ₹64 billion (US$660 million) up for auction and fixed the price of 900 MHz, two times higher than 1800 MHz. DoT issued notice inviting applications for spectrum auction on 30 January 2013, and the last date for submitting an application was 25 February 2013. The auction for all three bands was planned to begin on 11 March 2013. However, no bidders expressed interest in the 1800 MHz and 900 MHz bands and as a result, the auction for those bands was postponed indefinitely. The auction for spectrum in 800 MHz band proceeded as planned on 11 March.

No companies tendered bids for spectrum in 1800 MHz and 900 MHz bands, and MTS India was the only bidder in the 800 MHz band. Vodafone Group's CEO Vittorio Colao stated, "The problem is that in India there is a misperception of what is the value of spectrum. The reserve prices are set too high. India has very low prices and very low revenues so we cannot afford to pay high price for spectrum. We have told them [Indian government] a number of times that the order of magnitude that they have in mind just does not make sense".

Participants

The sole bidder in the auction was Sistema Shyam TeleServices Limited (SSTL), under the brand name MTS, who bid for spectrum in the 800 MHz band.

Results

The auction was held on 11 March and lasted little over 4 hours. Auction rounds were scheduled to begin between 0900 hrs and 1900 hrs IST. The table shows the prices per block for each of the 11 telecom circles in which spectrum was put up for auction. The participant in the auction, MTS, won spectrum in 8 circles and did not bid for 3 circles. No spectrum was put up for auction in the remaining circles of India.

== 2014 Spectrum Auction ==
In 2014, the Dot auctioned 2G telecom spectrum in the frequency range of 900Mhz and 1800 MHz. The winners were awarded spectrum in February. The Government earned ₹612 billion (US$6.4 billion) from the spectrum auction. The 1800 MHz spectrum auctioned were cancelled by the Supreme Court, following the 2G spectrum case. The government put on sale 307.2 MHz of 1800 and 46 MHz of 900 MHz-wide spectrum. The licences are valid for 20 years. Vodafone and Bharti were already using 900 MHz frequency and had to renew before their license expire in November 2014. Reliance Jio, the only company to have all-India 4G license entered into voice service and won in 14 circles in 1800 MHz frequency. Companies also plan to provide 3G and 4G services on the spectrum.

Participants

The private companies which participated in the auction were:

- Airtel
- Vodafone India
- Idea
- Aircel
- Reliance Communications
- Reliance Jio
- Tata Teleservices
- Uninor

Results

The auction took place over 10 days and consisted of 68 rounds of bidding. The most expensive telecom circle in both 900 & 1800 MHz frequencies was Delhi at a price of ₹ 7409.6 million and ₹ 728 million per operator. Delhi and Mumbai together accounted for 57% of the total bids.

900 MHz
Circle / Operator	Vodafone	Airtel	Idea	Total
Delhi	check	check	check	3
Kolkata	check	check	X mark	2
Mumbai	check	check	X mark	2
Total	3	3	1	7

1800 MHz
Circle / Operator	Vodafone	Airtel	Rel Jio	Idea	Aircel	Uninor	RCom	Tata	Total
Andhra Pradesh	check	check	check	check	X mark	check	X mark	X mark	5
Assam	X mark	X mark	check	X mark	X mark	check	X mark	X mark	2
Bihar	X mark	X mark	X mark	X mark	X mark	check	X mark	X mark	1
Delhi	check	check	check	check	X mark	X mark	X mark	X mark	4
Gujarat	check	X mark	check	check	X mark	X mark	X mark	X mark	3
Haryana	check	X mark	X mark	check	X mark	check	X mark	X mark	2
Himachal Pradesh	X mark	check	X mark	X mark	X mark	X mark	X mark	X mark	1
Jammu & Kashmir	X mark	check	X mark	X mark	check	X mark	X mark	X mark	2
Karnataka	check	check	check	check	X mark	X mark	X mark	X mark	4
Kerala	check	check	check	check	X mark	X mark	X mark	X mark	4
Kolkata	check	check	check	X mark	X mark	check	X mark	X mark	3
Madhya Pradesh	X mark	check	check	check	X mark	X mark	X mark	X mark	3
Maharashtra & Goa	X mark	X mark	check	check	X mark	X mark	X mark	X mark	2
Mumbai	check	check	check	check	X mark	check	check	X mark	5
North East	X mark	check	check	check	check	X mark	X mark	X mark	4
Orissa	X mark	check	check	X mark	X mark	X mark	X mark	X mark	2
Punjab	check	check	X mark	check	X mark	X mark	X mark	X mark	3
Rajasthan	check	check	X mark	X mark	check	X mark	X mark	X mark	3
Tamil Nadu	X mark	check	check	X mark	X mark	check	X mark	X mark	2
Uttar Pradesh (East)	check	X mark	X mark	X mark	check	check	X mark	X mark	3
Uttar Pradesh (West)	X mark	X mark	X mark	X mark	X mark	check	X mark	X mark	1
West Bengal	X mark	check	check	X mark	check	X mark	X mark	X mark	3
Total	11	15	14	11	5	9	1	0	62

== 2015 Spectrum Auction ==
The 2015 spectrum auction concluded on 25 March, after 19 days and 115 rounds of bidding. Spectrum in the 800 MHz, 900 MHz, 1800 MHz and 2100 MHz bands was auctioned. The Government accrued a total of ₹109,874 crore (US$11 billion) from the auction. Approximately, 11% of the spectrum available for auction remained unsold.

Participants

The private companies which participated in the auction were:

- Airtel
- Vodafone India
- Idea
- Reliance Jio
- Reliance Communications
- Aircel
- Tata Docomo
- Uninor

== 2016 Spectrum Auction ==
The 2016 spectrum auction was held beginning 1 October. A total of 2354.55 MHz of spectrum ranging across the 7 bands of 700 MHz, 850 MHz, 900 MHz, 1800 MHz, 2100 MHz, 2300 MHz and 2500 MHz was put up for sale across 22 different circles. This was the first auction in India in which 700 MHz band spectrum was put on auction.

Bharti Airtel, Vodafone, Idea Cellular, Reliance Communications, Tata Teleservices, Aircel and Reliance Jio had applied to participate in the auction. Telenor did not participate. Only 40% of the spectrum put up for auction was sold as the base price set was high.

In 2017, the government initiated auction of 5G spectrum for the first time. Spectrum in bands over 3000 MHz(3300 to 3600 MHz) will be sold in the auction. Previously unsold spectrum in the bands 800 MHz, 900 MHz, 1800 MHz, 2100 MHz, 2300 MHz, and 2500 MHz will also be auctioned. Though TRAI completed consultation with stake holders no further action has happened probably because of the industry's demand to push back the spectrum sale.

In 2018, the government is expected to lower the price of 700 MHz band, which went completely unsold in 2016 due to extremely high reserve price. Government's focus will be in 5G bands. Telecom regulator TRAI recommended the 700 MHz, 800 MHz, 900 MHz, 1800 MHz and 3300-3600 MHz bands to be auctioned as 5G bands. More recently, in December 2019, the Digital Communications Commission (DCC) decided to keep the reserve prices for the sale of 8,300 mega hertz (MHz) spectrum at Rs 5.22 lakh crore. The upcoming auctions will be held between March and April next year, and will also offer for auction airwaves for 5G telephony services.

== 2021 Spectrum Auction ==
The 2021 spectrum auction began on 1 March 2021 with a total of 2308.80 MHz spectrum available for auction. Three bidders participated in the auction - Airtel, Vi, and Reliance Jio. The auction concluded after 2 days with bids being received for 37% of the spectrum on offer. No bids were received for the spectrum in the 700 MHz and 2500 MHz bands. Jio acquired 488.35 MHz of spectrum for ₹57,122.65 crore, Airtel received 355.45 MHz of spectrum for ₹18,698.75 crore, and Vi acquired 11.80 MHz for ₹1,993.40 crore, earning the government a total of ₹77,814.80 crore (US$8.1 billion). Dot assigned the airwaves to the respective winners on 16 April 2021 after an extensive Spectrum Harmonization exercise across the 800, 900, 1800, 2100 and 2300 MHz bands.

== 2022 Spectrum Auction ==
The auction received bids worth INR 1.50 trillion across frequency bands including 5G. Primary bidders were Airtel, Jio and Vi. The bids were made for 71% of the spectrum on offer.
