= Nikhil =

- Gender: Male

Other gender
- Masculine: Yes

Origin
- Word/name: Sanskrit and other languages of India

Nikhil (Sanskrit: निखिल) is a male name of Sanskrit origin. It is predominantly found in India, Nepal, and the diaspora of these countries. The name means "complete" or "whole".

== Notable people ==
- Nikhil Advani, Hindi film director
- Nikhil Alleyne, American-Trinidadian alpine skier
- Nikhil Banerjee, sitar player
- Nikhil Chopra, retired cricketer
- Nikhil D'Souza, Indian singer
- Nikhil Dwivedi, Hindi actor
- Nikhil Kadam, football player
- Nikhil Kanetkar, Olympic badminton player
- Nikhil Kumar (actor), Indian actor and politician
- Nikhil Kumar (chess player), American chess player
- Nikhil Kumar (governor), IPS officer-turned politician, governor of Nagaland, and of Kerala
- Nikhil Kumar (table tennis), American table tennis player
- Nikhil Nanda, industrialist
- Nikhil Paul George, music producer
- Nikhil Rathi, chief executive of the UK's Financial Conduct Authority
- Nikhil Siddhartha, Indian actor in Telugu-language cinema
- Nikhil Seetharam, Canadian composer
- Nikhil Srivastava, Indian scientist
- Nikhil Tandon, Professor of Endocrinology at AIIMS, New Delhi
- Nikhil Thakur, Indian Internet activist
- Nikhil Aaditya Vijay
