= Dataone =

Dataone may refer to:

- BSNL Broadband or Dataone, an Internet access service in India since 2005
- DataONE, a cyberinfrastructure project supported by the National Science Foundation under the DataNet program
