= ITU-APT Foundation of India =

ITU - APT Foundation of India(IAFI)

- ITU-APT Foundation of India (IAFI)
- Formation: 2003
- Type: Non Profitable Organization
- Purpose: Advocacy and capacity building in telecommunications, information and communication technologies (ICTs), and emerging digital infrastructure.
- Headquarters: ITU-APT SECRETARIAT, 504, 5th Floor, World Trade Center (Behind Lalit Hotel) Barakhamba Road, New Delhi - 110001, India
- President: Shri Bharat Bhatia
- Vice Presidents: Shri RK Mishra; Shri RP Agrawal; Shri Rajesh Mehrotra; Shri K.S. Srinivas; Shri Utpal Kanti Mandal; Shri Vimal Wakhlu; Shri H.C. Soni
- Secretary General: Shri Satya. N. Gupta
- Website: www.itu-apt.org

The ITU-APT Foundation of India (IAFI) is a non-profit, non-governmental organization headquartered in New Delhi, India. Founded in 2003, it facilitates the participation of Indian stakeholders in international discussions related to telecommunications and information and communication technologies (ICTs).

IAFI collaborates with the International Telecommunication Union (ITU) and the Asia-Pacific Telecommunity (APT), serving as a sector member of ITU-R, ITU-D, and ITU-T. This membership enables the organization to participate in discussions and submit technical contributions concerning radiocommunications, development, and standardization. In these capacities, IAFI articulates and advances India’s perspectives on global telecommunications issues.

The organization serves as a platform for collaboration among diverse stakeholders in India’s telecommunications sector, including government agencies, industry bodies, and academic institutions. It focuses on policy development in key areas such as spectrum management, digital inclusion, rural connectivity, and emerging technologies including 5G, 6G, and satellite communications.

== History ==
Established in 2003, the ITU-APT Foundation of India (IAFI) was founded to facilitate India’s participation in global information and communication technology (ICT) governance. It aims to support national efforts in technical, regulatory, and policy matters within international bodies such as the International Telecommunication Union (ITU) and the Asia-Pacific Telecommunity (APT). Since its inception, IAFI has consistently contributed technical proposals and policy inputs to international telecommunications conferences and meetings.

== Objectives ==
IAFI’s stated objectives encompass facilitating the active participation of Indian stakeholders in international policy-making processes related to information and communication technologies (ICTs). The foundation aims to support the harmonization of domestic telecommunications regulations with globally recognized standards established by bodies such as the ITU and APT. It plays a significant role in strengthening institutional and individual capacity through technical training, awareness workshops, and expert consultations. Additionally, IAFI advocates for forward-looking reforms and promotes research and innovation in areas such as digital infrastructure, satellite communication, next-generation networks, and spectrum policy to enhance India's digital ecosystem.

== Activities ==
The organization organizes national and international conferences, expert group meetings, and capacity-building workshops to foster knowledge sharing and collaborative policy dialogue. These initiatives aim to support evidence-based policymaking and promote engagement between public institutions, industry stakeholders, academic researchers, and civil society. IAFI also plays a preparatory role in supporting India’s contributions to major international telecommunications forums, such as the World Radiocommunication Conference (WRC), by facilitating technical discussions and coordinating stakeholder inputs.

== Selected Events ==
Notable events hosted or co-organized by IAFI include the Wi-Fi in 6 GHz – Unlocking Innovation workshop (June 2025), the 2nd WRC-27 Preparatory Workshop (April 2025), and the ISPC-25 Space Policy Conference (July 2025), held in collaboration with the Global Satellite Operators Association (GSOA). Additionally, IAFI convened the 4th India Spectrum Management Conference (ISMC-24) in November 2024, focusing on national spectrum policy and regulatory developments.

== Collaborations ==
The ITU-APT Foundation of India collaborates with key national and international stakeholders in the telecommunications sector. Domestically, it works with the Department of Telecommunications (DoT) and the Telecom Regulatory Authority of India (TRAI), as well as with industry associations and academic institutions. Internationally, IAFI engages with organizations such as the International Telecommunication Union (ITU), the Asia-Pacific Telecommunity (APT), and the Global Satellite Operators Association (GSOA). These collaborations are aimed at advancing policy advocacy, promoting research, and supporting capacity-building initiatives.

== Areas of Focus ==
The foundation focuses on a range of policy and technical areas, including spectrum policy and allocation, the development of next-generation mobile networks such as 5G and 6G, satellite-based communications and broadband access, rural and remote connectivity, and frameworks for ICT standardization and regulation. These thematic areas align with IAFI's broader objectives of advancing equitable access to digital infrastructure and promoting technological progress in India's telecom sector.

== See also ==
- International Telecommunication Union
- Asia-Pacific Telecommunity
- Telecommunications in India
- Department of Telecommunications (India)
