= Andhra Pradesh State FiberNet Limited =

Communications network in Andhra Pradesh, India

- Type: Public
- Industry: Telecommunications
- Founded: 26 October 2015 (10 years ago)
- Headquarters: Vijayawada, Andhra Pradesh, India
- Area served: Andhra Pradesh
- Key people: B. C. Janardhan Reddy (Minister of Infrastructure and Investment, Government of Andhra Pradesh); Vacant (Chairman); Praveen Aditya, IAS (Managing Director)
- Services: Fixed line; Broadband; Internet services; Digital television; Internet Protocol television
- Owner: Government of Andhra Pradesh
- Parent: Ministry of Infrastructure and Investment, Government of Andhra Pradesh
- Website: APSFL official website

Andhra Pradesh State FiberNet Limited (APSFL) is a fully owned entity of the Government of Andhra Pradesh, India, started in October 2015. The project aims to provide affordable end-to-end broadband, wi-fi connection, internet facility, cable television, and phone connectivity in the state of Andhra Pradesh, India. The project was announced by N. Chandrababu Naidu and was launched by the President of India on 27 December 2017 in a ceremony conducted in the capital city of Amaravati.

== Overview ==
It is owned by the Government of Andhra Pradesh, but has a partnership with Cisco Systems. The project seeks to provide accessible Broadband connectivity on a non-discriminatory basis to households and corporate users, including an expansion of internet access for users in rural areas. Its main aim is to provide 15 to 50 Mbit/s unlimited connections to all residents of Andhra pradesh, and 100 Mbit/s to 1 Gbit/s connections to businesses. The APSFL network also provides Internet Protocol television with over 200 channels and a landline telephone connection for free and unlimited calling to AP fiber phones within Andhra Pradesh.

== Implementation ==
The A.P. Fiber Grid Phase established a high-speed optical fiber network infrastructure across the state, funded by the Electricity Department. 24-core all-dielectric self-supporting cables were to be wrapped around electrical poles and laid for a length of around 23,000 km (14,000 mi), featuring back-end electronic systems set up at points of interests. Currently there are 2,449 sub-stations throughout the state. Only 16,000 km (9,900 mi) of the fibers were laid prior to June 2016, despite the target of 22,500 km (14,000 mi). The target was eventually met in September 2020. A network operations center has been commissioned at Visakhapatnam to look after the project in the state.

== Network ==
The network utilizes a ring-like architecture that is distributed across all 13 districts of Andhra Pradesh. It is a 1.3 Gbit/s dense wavelength-division multiplexing based optical fibre network arranged in a state ring with each district ring as a 100G DWDM subnet. As of September 2020, APSFL has over 970,000 users. Over 3,000 schools, universities, and government offices are connected to the network. It provides an average speed of 200 Gbit/s to its users.

== See also ==
- Jio
- BSNL Broadband
- BSNL Mobile
- Sanchar
- Atria Convergence Technologies
