= HFCL =

Indian telecommunications products manufacturer

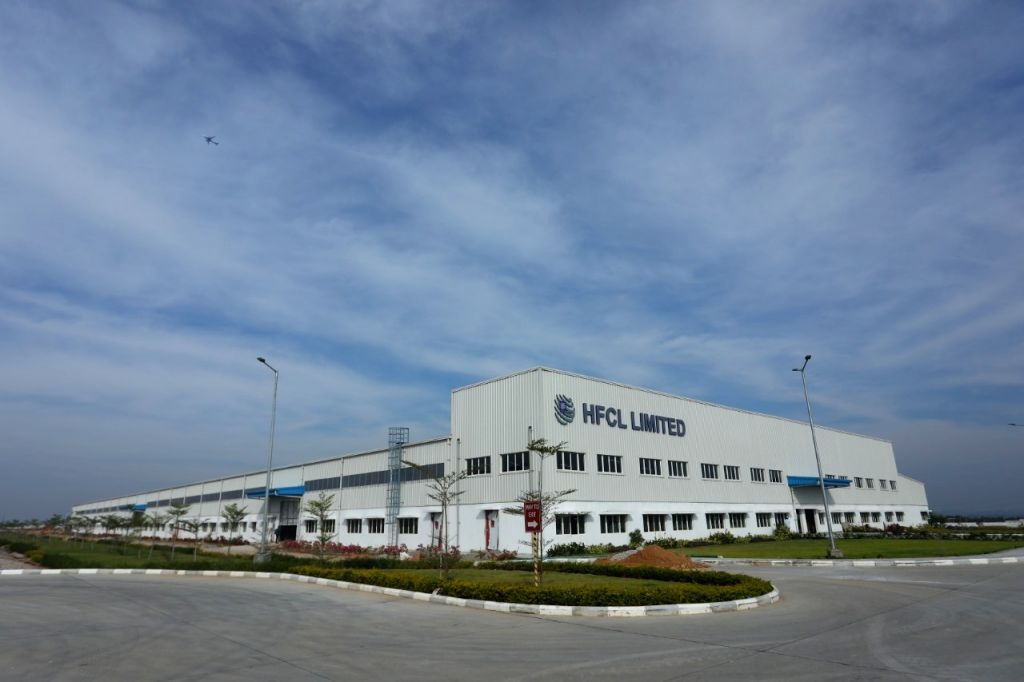
- HFCL Optical Fibre Plant in Hyderabad
- Formerly: Himachal Futuristic Communications Limited
- Type: Public
- Traded as: NSE: HFCL; BSE: 500183
- Industry: Telecommunications
- Founded: 1987
- Headquarters: Gurugram, Haryana, India
- Key people: Mahendra Pratap Shukla (Chairman); Mahendra Nahata (MD)
- Products: Telecommunications equipment Fiber-optic cable Electronic Parts
- Revenue: ▲₹4,743 crore (US$490 million) (2023)
- Number of employees: 1,719
- Subsidiaries: HTL Limited; EXICOM
- Website: hfcl.com

HFCL Limited is an Indian technology company which designs, develops, manufactures telecommunications equipment, fibre-optic cables and other related electronics.

The company is based in Gurugram and listed on both the Bombay Stock Exchange (BSE) and the National Stock Exchange (NSE). It serves various industries, such as telecommunications, security and railways, textiles, Cable fibre.

== History ==
In 1987, Himachal Futuristic Communications Limited was co-founded by Mahendra Nahata, Deepak Malhotra and Vinay Maloo. In May 1987, the company was incorporated as public limited company in the state of Himachal Pradesh.

The company set up manufacturing facilities in India for optical fibre cables, optical transport, power electronics and broadband equipment, and provided turnkey solutions to the Government of India's undertakings and private sector players across the world.. It has ties with C-DOT, C-DOT has agreed to transfer its technology to HFCL.

In 1995, company's ₹85,000 crore ($25 billion) bid for basic services license in India created the momentum for telecom industry in the country.

In 2000, Australian businessman Kerry Packer known for his contribution to the sport of cricket, invested in the company and took 10% stake.

CPH and HFCL set up two joint venture firms, one for software products and services and other for B2B e-commerce.

In 2018, HFCL launched its optical fibre manufacturing unit in Hyderabad.

== Operations ==
HFCL has its headquarters in Gurugram and production plants in Solan (Himachal Pradesh), Chennai (Tamil Nadu) and Goa. The company's regional offices are located in Indian states of Punjab, Rajasthan, Uttar Pradesh, West Bengal, Orissa, Madhya Pradesh, Maharashtra, Andhra Pradesh, Bihar, Kerala, Jharkhand and Uttarakhand.

== Subsidiaries ==
- HFCL Advance Systems
- Moneta Finance Ltd
- HTL Limited
- DragonWave HFCL Ltd.
- Microwave Communications
- Polixel Security Systems

== See also ==
- Telecommunications in India
- Fibre-optic communication
