= Nikhil Kumar (chess player) =

American chess player (born 2004)

Personal information
- Born: 2004 (age 21–22)

Chess career
- Country: United States
- Title: International Master (2021)
- FIDE rating: 2336 (September 2021)
- Peak rating: 2479 (February 2017)

Nikhil Kumar (born 2004) is an American chess international master. His peak rating was 2479. He was also the under 12 World Youth Chess Championship in 2016.

He won the U12 World Youth Chess Championship in 2016, beating Rameshbabu Praggnanandhaa.
