= Nikhil Thakur =

Nikhil Thakur (born 8 September 2003) is a hacker and Internet activist, known for exposing scams in Madhya Pradesh. At the age of 13 he had hacked the Madhya Pradesh and later the pan-India BSNL website. He hacked the Rajiv Gandhi Proudyogiki Vishwavidyalaya website. Afterwards Thakur started exposing scams. He exposed the scholarship scam of Arihant, Priyatam, and BM colleges in Indore and later the pre-medical test scam held in Madhya Pradesh.
