= Tata Teleservices =

Indian telecommunications company

Tata Teleservices Limited
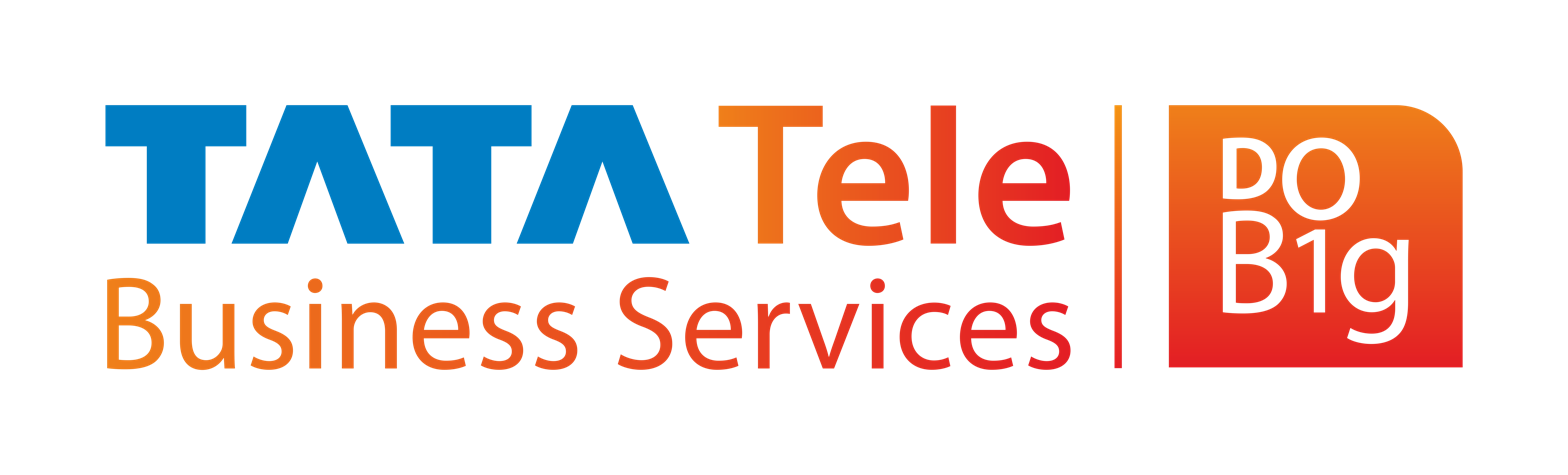
- Company type: Public
- Traded as: NSE: TTML; BSE: 532371
- ISIN: INE517B01013
- Industry: Telecommunication
- Founded: 1996
- Founder: Tata Sons
- Headquarters: Mumbai, Maharashtra, India
- Area served: India
- Key people: Harjit Singh (MD)
- Products: Broadband; Internet services; IT Services
- Revenue: ▼₹280.13 crore (US$29 million) (2023)
- Net income: ▲₹287.95 crore (US$30 million) (2023)
- Total assets: ▼₹1,200 crore (US$130 million) (2023)
- Number of employees: 1685 (2023)
- Parent: Tata Group
- Divisions: Enterprise Solutions
- Website: www.tatatelebusiness.com

Tata Teleservices Limited along with its subsidiary Tata Teleservices (Maharashtra) Limited is an Indian internet services provider and IT services company headquartered in Mumbai, India. It is listed on BSE and NSE in India.

== History ==
On 13 March 1995, Tata Tele (Maharashtra) Limited was founded as Hughes Ispat Limited, operating under the legal framework of the Companies Act of 1956. On 26 April 2000, the company changed its name to Hughes Tele.com (India) Limited to reflect its emphasis on broadband services.

On 13 February 2003, the company underwent a name change to Tata Teleservices (Maharashtra) Limited. It currently operates as a subsidiary of Tata Teleservices Limited.

In 2009, the company introduced mobile voice calling based on a pay per use model.

According to Business Today Report, in November 2010, Tata Teleservices became the first private telecommunications operator to launch 3G services in India.

Tata Teleservices operates a long fibre optic network spanning 132,000 kilometres and has a presence in over 70 cities. Tata Teleservices operates as a channel partner-based organization with a partner model encompassing approximately 1800+ partners nationwide.

In February 2008, TTSL announced that it would provide CDMA mobile services targeted towards the youth, in association with the Virgin Group on a franchisee model basis.

In November 2008, Japanese telecom giant NTT Docomo acquired a 26 per cent equity stake in Tata Indicom, a subsidiary of Tata Teleservices, for about ₹130.7 billion (US$1.4 billion) or an enterprise value of ₹502.69 billion (US$5.2 billion).

NTT DoCoMo announced on 25 April 2014 that they would sell their shares in Tata Indicom to Tata Teleservices and exit the Indian market. The company had reported a loss of $780 million during financial year ending 31 March 2014.

By 1 April 2015, all Virgin Mobile CDMA and GSM customers have been migrated into the umbrella Tata Indicom brand (Tata Indicom for Mumbai NCR).

In April 2015 Tata Teleservices dropped the DoCoMo from its telecom brand. According to The Hindu reporting, the decision was made several months prior to the termination of the telecommunications company's contract with the Japanese operator NTT DoCoMo, allowing them to continue using the brand until the agreement's conclusion.

In August 2017, Tata Teleservices sought to exit mobile network division due to large losses and debt, then sold its unit to Bharti Airtel in a debt free and cash-free deal and described as virtually free; Airtel will only pay a part of Tata Teleservices's unpaid spectrum payment liability. In November 2017, Tata Teleservices customers transitioned to the Airtel mobile network under an Intra Circle Roaming (ICR) arrangement. SIM cards and billing plans remained the same. The consumer mobile businesses of Tata Docomo, Tata Teleservices (TTSL) and Tata Teleservices Maharashtra Limited (TTML) have been merged into Bharti Airtel from 1 July 2019.

On 9 October 2017 Tata Teleservices announced it is preparing an exit plan for most of its 5,000-odd employees, which includes a notice of three to six months, severance packages for those willing to leave earlier, a voluntary retirement scheme (VRS) for elders, while transferring only a small part of its employees to other group companies.

On 12 October 2017, Bharti Airtel announced that it would acquire the consumer mobile businesses of Tata Teleservices Ltd (TTSL) and Tata Teleservices Maharastra Ltd (TTML) in a debt-free cash-free deal. The deal will essentially be free for Airtel which will only incur TTSL's unpaid spectrum payment liability. TTSL will continue to operate its enterprise, fixed line and broadband businesses and its stake in tower company Viom Networks. The deal received approval from the Competition Commission of India (CCI) in mid-November 2017. On 29 August 2018, Bharti Airtel, got its shareholders approval for the merger proposal with Tata Teleservices.

On 17 January 2019 NCLT Delhi gave final approval merger between Tata Docomo and Airtel. Department of Telecom (DoT), and Competition Commission of India (CCI) gave green signals for merger deal between Bharti Airtel and Tata Teleservices. The consumer mobile businesses of Tata Docomo, Tata Teleservices (TTSL) and Tata Teleservices Maharashtra Limited (TTML) have been merged into Bharti Airtel from 1 July 2019.

== Product ==
According to The Economic Times report In 2018, Tata Tele Business Services introduced VPN solutions intended for small and medium-sized enterprises (SMEs).

In 2019, Tata Tele Business Services introduced SmartOffice. In 2021, amidst the pandemic, Tata Tele Business Services launched Smartflo, a cloud communication suite.

== See also ==
- Mobile phone companies of India
- VSNL
