= Tulip Telecom =

Indian telecommunications company

Tulip Telecom Limited
- Type: Public
- Traded as: BSE: 532691; NSE: TULIP
- Founded: 2 July 1992
- Founder: Lt. Col. H. S. Bedi
- Headquarters: New Delhi, India
- Key people: Mr. Santosh Choudary
- Website: www.tulip.net

Tulip Telecom Limited, was an IT Services Ltd.Indian telecommunications services provider.

== History ==
The company was started by Lt Col Hardeep Singh Bedi an ex-army man. After serving the Indian army for 22 years, Lt Col HS Bedi took voluntary retirement and founded his company Tulip IT Services, then Tulip Software Pvt Ltd, in 1994 and today it is known as Tulip Telecom Ltd.

Tulip Telecom Ltd has three main line of business, data connectivity, Managed Services and data centres. Realizing the very wide spread of the country and the inability of copper to be used as a medium for connectivity, Tulip focussed on using wireless for the last mile.

The company leases Inter-city Fibre from most telcos in India and uses wireless and fibre for the last mile. Today Tulip covers over 3000 cities / towns on its network. Its fibre network reaches almost every major building in the metros.

Frost and Sullivan has recognized it as being the largest player in the MPLS VPN market with a share of almost 34%. It provides Internet, VPN and international data connectivity.

== Business strategy ==
Tulip focuses on the three needs of its enterprise customers, Data Connectivity, managed services and data centres.

== Data centre ==
The company has set up the world's third largest data centre in Whitefield, Bengaluru. Built to LEED Gold standards, it is designed to be a true Tier 4 Data centre. It achieves a very low PUE.

The company's customers includes AT&T, Orange Business Services, IBM, HP and UIDAI.

This is Tulip's fifth data centre in the country, which will increases the combined space under its data centres to approximately 10 lakh square feet. Tulip already has one data centre each in Delhi and Bengaluru and two in Mumbai.

== FCCBs ==
Tulip had in 2012 Bonds of FCCB due with a face value of $100 m for 150m due, along with premium. It had arranged fresh bonds and debt but due to a freak trade and circumstances beyond its control, the bonds could not be redeemed in time and the company went into default. A Provisional liquidator was appointed by the Delhi High Court. The Winding up has been stayed by the Honourable Division bench of Delhi High Court on the grounds that this is a core infrastructure company.

The Banks appointed top global auditors and the assets of the company were valued by them at Rs 3000 Cr.

The company is now in the process of restructuring its debt and business.
