= S Tel =

Indian mobile network operator

S Tel Private Limited
- Company type: Limited
- Industry: Telecommunications
- Founded: January 2008
- Defunct: February 2012
- Fate: License cancelled by the Supreme Court of India
- Products: GSM, GPRS, EDGE

S Tel Private Limited was a GSM based cellular operator in India. It was owned jointly by Chinnakannan Sivasankaran. (51%) and Bahrain Telecommunications (49%). On 2 February 2012 Supreme Court of India cancelled all 122 spectrum licences granted during the tenure of former communications minister A Raja. Six licences of S Tel were cancelled, and Batelco sold its stake in S Tel. The sale was completed in late 2012.

== Controversy ==
=== License cancelled by Supreme Court ===
On 2 February 2012, The Supreme Court of India cancelled all 122 spectrum licences granted during the tenure of former communications minister A Raja, including the 6 licenses granted to S Tel. The Supreme Court of India also imposed a fine of ₹ 50 lakh on S Tel.

=== Batelco sells stake ===
On 8 February 2012, a few days after The Supreme Court ruling, Batelco sold its 42.7% share of S Tel to Sky City Foundation Ltd of India for 65.8 million Bahraini dinar (US$174.5 million). Batelco's Group Chief Executive Shaikh Mohamed bin Isa Al Khalifa said in a statement, "BMIC Limited, a 100 per cent Batelco-owned subsidiary company, entered into an agreement, in the fourth quarter of 2011 to sell its 42.7 per cent stake in S Tel for USD 174.5 million to its Indian partner, Sky City Foundation Limited". The sale was to be completed by the end of October 2012.

=== Current status ===
S Tel services is no longer available in India following the cancellation of its six UAS licenses on 17 February 2012. On 29 February 2012 it was reported that S Tel boss Sivasankaran wrote to Manmohan Singh, former Prime Minister of India, demanding Rs. 1700 Crore investment while offering to surrender its licenses.
