= BSNL =

Indian central public sector undertaking

Bharat Sanchar Nigam Limited

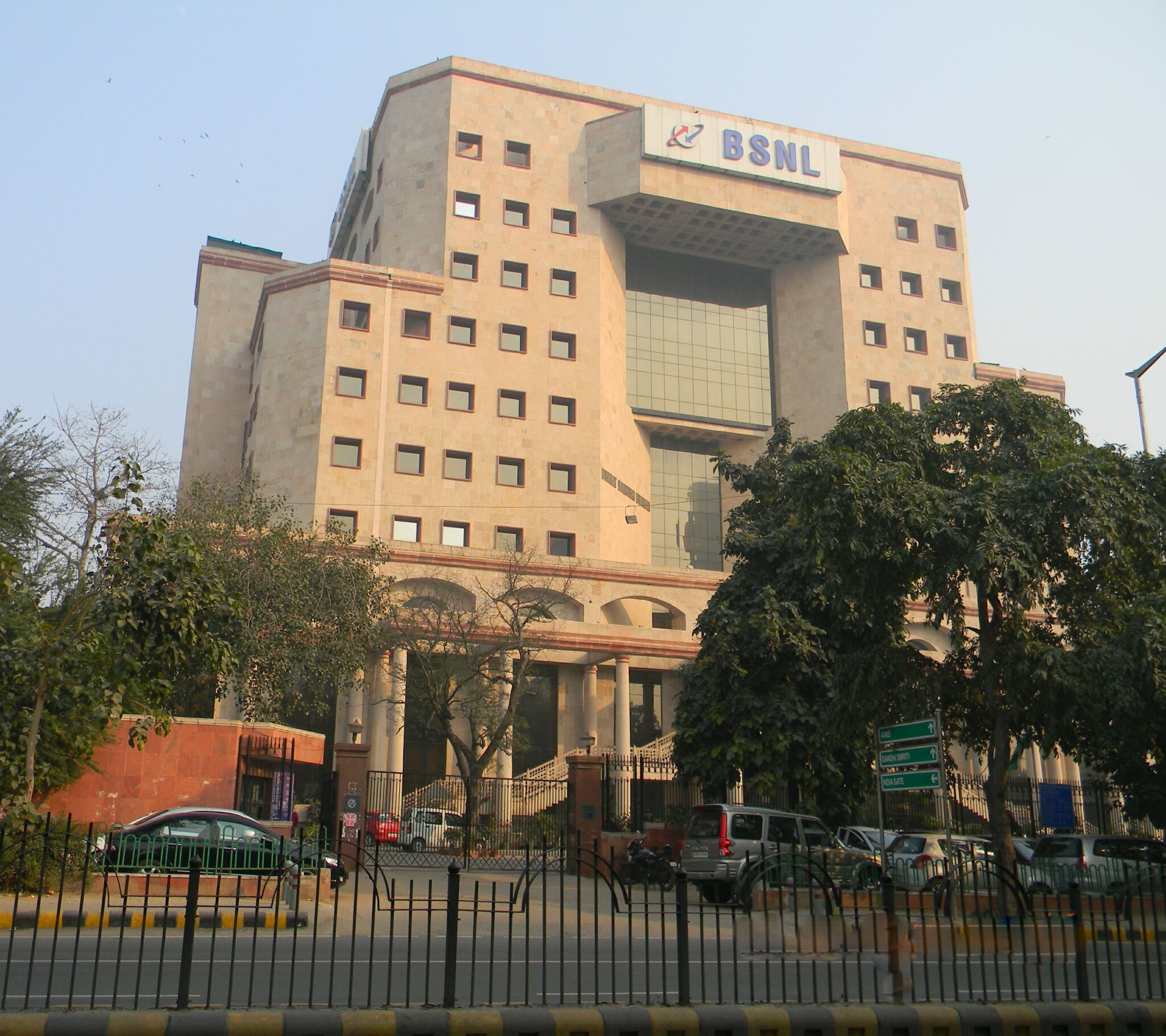
- BSNL headquarters at New Delhi
- Type: Central Public Sector Undertaking
- Industry: Telecommunications
- Founded: 1 October 2000; 26 years ago
- Founder: Government of India
- Headquarters: New Delhi, India
- Area served: India; Nepal (as MTNL); Mauritius (as MTML)
- Key people: A. Robert J. Ravi, ITS (Chairman & MD)
- Services: FTTH; Fixed line telephone; Mobile telephony; Broadband; Internet services; Streaming television; IPTV
- Revenue: ▲₹23,427 crore (US$2.5 billion) (2025)
- Operating income: ▲₹20,841 crore (US$2.2 billion) (2025)
- Net income: ▲₹−2,247 crore (US$−240 million) (2025)
- Total assets: ▲₹167,086 crore (US$18 billion) (2024)
- Total equity: ▲₹106,626 crore (US$11 billion) (2024)
- Owner: Department of Telecommunications, Ministry of Communications, Government of India
- Members: ▲9.2 crore (91.95 million) (December 2025)
- Number of employees: 51,145 (as on 30 June 2024, as per RTI)
- Divisions: Bharat Fiber; BSNL Broadband; BSNL Mobile; Bharat Net; BSNL Towers
- Subsidiaries: Mahanagar Telephone Nigam Limited
- Website: bsnl.co.in

Bharat Sanchar Nigam Limited, commonly known as BSNL, is an Indian central public sector undertaking owned by the Department of Telecommunications. It was established on 1 October 2000 by the Government of India. It provides mobile voice and internet services through its nationwide telecommunications network across India. It is the largest government-owned-wireless telecommunications service provider in India.

== History ==
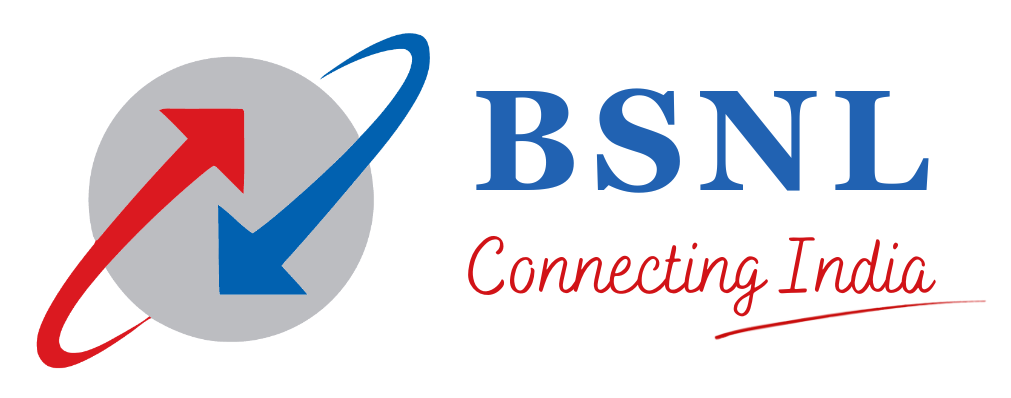
BSNL logo used until October 2024

Bharat Sanchar Nigam Limited is an Indian government enterprise and its history can be traced back to British Raj. The foundation of the telecommunications network in India was laid by the British sometime during the 19th century. During the British era, the first telegraph line was established between Kolkata and Diamond Harbour in 1850. The British East India Company started using the telegraph in 1851, and by 1854, telegraph lines were laid across the country. In 1854, the telegraph service was opened to the public, and the first telegram was sent from Mumbai to Pune. In 1885, the Indian Telegraph Act was passed by the British Imperial Legislative Council. After the bifurcation of the Post and Telegraph department in the 1980s, the creation of Department of Telecom eventually led to the emergence of the government owned telegraph and telephone enterprise, which led to the foundation of BSNL. Until the early 2000s, BSNL was the only service provider for Indian Railways to control and administrative communication circuits. Later, they were separated as RailTel.

For 160 years, BSNL had operated the public telegram service. In 2010, the telex network between its 182 offices was replaced with the "Web-Based Telegram Messaging System" which relied on internet connections rather than telex lines (which are more reliable where power outages are more common). This led to a decline in service, and the company applied the title "diminished service" to telegrams in 2010. Finally, on 15 July 2013, the public telegram service was shut down completely. BSNL also enjoys a part of revenue from the payments made for private players for recharge plans.

== Products and services ==
=== Telephone and Mobile ===
BSNL provides both fixed line telephones and mobile telephony services on the GSM platform.

==== BSNL Mobile ====
BSNL Mobile is a major provider of GSM network services under the brand names CellOne and BSNL all over India. It has a wide network coverage in both urban and rural areas of India. It has over 121.82 million customers across India.

BSNL Mobile offers prepaid, postpaid services and value-added services such as Free Phone Service (FPS), India Telephone Card (Prepaid card), Account Card Calling (ACC), Virtual Private Network (VPN), Tele-voting, Premium Rate Service (PRM). It also offers the IPTV, which enables customers to watch television through the Internet and Voice and Video Over Internet Protocol (VVoIP).

==== BSNL Landline ====
BSNL Landline was launched in the early 1990s. It was the only fixed-line telephone service for the whole country before the New Telecom Policy was announced by the Department of Telecommunications in 1999. Only the Government-owned BSNL and MTNL were allowed to provide land-line phone services through copper wire in the country. BSNL Landline is the largest fixed-line telephony in India. It has over 9.55 million customers and 47.20% market share in the country as of 28 February 2021.

=== Internet ===
BSNL is the fourth-largest ISP in India, having a presence throughout the country. It also has the largest Firebase telecom network in the country, around 7.5 lakh kilometers, among the four operators in the country.

==== BSNL Broadband ====
BSNL Broadband provides telecom services to enterprise customers, including MPLS, P2P and Internet leased lines. It provides fixed-line services and landlines using CDMA technology and its own extensive optical fiber network. BSNL provides Internet access services through dial-up connections as prepaid, NetOne as postpaid, and DataOne as BSNL Broadband.

==== BSNL Bharat Fiber ====
BSNL Bharat Fiber (FTTH) was launched in February 2019. It offers TV over IP (IPTV), Video On-Demand (VoD), Voice over IP (VoIP), Audio On-Demand (AoD), Bandwidth On-Demand (BoD), remote education, video conferencing services, interactive gaming, and Virtual Private LAN services. BSNL has said that its optic fiber network provides fixed access to deliver high-speed Internet up to 300 Mbit/s.

==== Bharat Net ====
With effect to the government of India's policy decision to provide state-owned BSNL with another revival package worth 1.64 lakh crore rupees, the struggling PSU was merged with the Government's special purpose vehicle BBNL. This gave the struggling PSU a boost and an additional advantage of an additional 5.67 lakh kilometers of optical fiber, which has been laid across 1.85 lakh village panchayats in the country using the Universal Service Obligation Fund (USOF). Currently, it has an optical fibre cable network of over 6.83 lakh kilometres.

==== BSNL 4G ====
BSNL is the first telecom operator in India to start rolling out 4G service by using Mobile Broadband in 2009. In 2010 BWA auction, BSNL was allocated with 4G spectrum under 2300MHz Bandwidth (in all 20 telecom circles in India except Delhi & Mumbai because it is administered under MTNL network but MTNL also allocated with the same) which is also known as BWA or Broadband Wireless Access spectrum. It is initially used for WiMAX, and later the same is used for LTE service. BSNL was allocated the spectrum without participating in the BWA auction, because it is a state-owned entity, owing to which it has been provided with Auction Exception. So, in order to acquire the spectrum, BSNL has to pay the equivalent amount that private telecom players paid for the same Bandwidth in the Auction to the Government. So, BSNL has provided 8,500 crores to the Government for this spectrum. MTNL also provided 1120 crores to the Government for the same. In the meanwhile other telecom players were using LTE technology to provide 4G services, BSNL alone used WiMAX technology to provide 4G service. But WiMAX technology is not accepted globally due to which the technology got failed to prove. So BSNL returned back all the 4G WiMAX technologies to the Government and brought back the investment amount due to heavy financial debt incurred at the time. Reason behind the financial burden is because of its Legacy Systems and increasing pension to retired employees. Later in 2017-18 period BSNL provided 4G services in Few areas of India under Spectrum Reframing despite being not a proper 4G service. Under Make in India initiative, C-DOT (Centre for Development of Telemarics) developed the 4G core network for India. But the assembly segment was developed by Tejas Network (which was later brought by TATA) and the Government owned entity ITI (Indian Telephone Industries Limited).

BSNL started 4G service in some parts of India such as Bihar, Jharkhand, and Uttar Pradesh in January 2019, but it is limited to a few cities and towns. Most of its 4G services are currently available in Southern India. However, BSNL is trying to launch pan-India 4G services up to September 2022. The telecom minister said that BSNL will launch its 4G services all over India on the 75th Independence Day of India along with various other projects. BSNL is using 700 MHz and 2100 MHz bands to roll out the 4G services which can be upgraded to 5G in the future. BSNL has installed more than 40,000 plus 4G enabled and 5G ready towers. On 27 September 2025, PM Narendra Modi launched BSNL's Swadeshi 4G Network and commissioned 97500 towers developed indigenously.

==== BSNL 5G ====
On behalf of the Union of India, the Minister of Communications Ashwini Vaishnaw announced that the State-Owned Telco would start its 5G operations by 15 August 2023. He also added that the 4G and 5G network of the state-owned BSNL would be a completely home-grown indigenous 4G and 5G network technology; thus, emphasizing more on Union of India's Atmanirbhar Bharat.

==== Direct-to-Device ====
In November 2024, BSNL introduced and made a trial of the new Direct-to-Device technology for the first time in India in partnership with VIASAT. This technology enables users to communicate without transversing a Base Station or Core Network. This technology is used in direct interaction between 5G-enabled devices to connect seamlessly to both terrestrial and satellite coverage.

=== IP & cloud services ===
==== BSNL Managed Cloud Services ====
On 28 May 2013, BSNL launched "Internet Data Centre – Managed Cloud Services". This includes computation, software, data access and storage services for individuals as well as enterprises.

Services include:

- Cloud compute
- Cloud Storage
- Hosted Exchange
- Hosted Virtual Desktop Infra (VDI)
- Hosted Gateway
- Hosted Email filter
- Hosted web filter
- Hosted backup and restore
- Hosted DR
- Hosted communication Services
- Hosted Database

==== BSNL Wing Services ====
On 16 August 2018, BSNL launched "BSNL Wings Services" in 22 telecom circles, in which there is no need for a SIM card or FTTH as it is a VoIP service through an app. It offers unlimited free calling for one year throughout India.

== Administrative units ==
=== BSNL vertical divisions ===
BSNL is primarily divided into three vertical divisions:

- BSNL — Consumer Fixed Access (CFA), wire line and broadband business.
- BSNL — Consumer Mobility (CM), wireless business, primarily 3G/4G GSM services, WLL-M services. WLL-M
- BSNL — Enterprise Business, Enterprise customers on turnkey basis.

Other than these three vertical divisions, there are electrical wings and civil wings, which take care of real estate monetization.

=== BSNL horizontal divisions ===
Horizontally, BSNL is divided into several administrative units, variously known as telecom circles, metro districts, project circles and specialized units. It has 24 telecom circles, two metro districts, six project circles, four maintenance regions, five telecom factories, three training institutions and four specialized telecom units. Each circle is headed by a Chief General Manager (CGM) who is an officer of Indian Telecom Service (ITS).

The organizational structure of BSNL is as follows: Chief General Manager being the head of the Circle who is the officer of HAG+ level, assisted by three or four Principal General Manager (PGM) who are the officer of grade HAG. The districts over a circle is being headed by the designations as General Manager officer of grade of SAG who looks over around two to four districts, while where the connections are less and the smaller district is being headed by Telecom District Manager (TDM) Officer of the grade of JAG and Telecom Divisional Engineer (TDE) officer of STS grade, all the officers above the post of TDE (including TDE) are of Group A, and they are the officers of grade of Indian Telecom Service (ITS) directly or promotive. Then the Group B consists of Additional Divisional Engineer, Sub Divisional Engineer and Junior Telecom officer and then the organization has Group C and D employees.

== Merger and acquisitions ==
On 24 October 2019, the Union of India announced a revival package for BSNL and MTNL which includes monetizing assets, raising funds, TD-LTE spectrum, and a voluntary retirement scheme for employees. Apart from the package, the Ministry of Communications has decided to merge MTNL with BSNL. Pending this, MTNL will be a wholly owned subsidiary of BSNL.

On 24 October 2019, the Union of India announced a revival package for BSNL and has given its agreement to an in-principle merger (operational merger, i.e., only the operations of MTNL and BSNL would be merged, and they would be managed by BSNL) for MTNL and BSNL

On 27 July 2022, the Union of India announced another revival package for the state-owned BSNL, for providing 4G and 5G services making the PSU more viable and vibrant and turning it into a profit making organisation; under this policy decision the government also merged BBNL with BSNL.

== Controversies ==
=== Website Hacking ===
In 2012 Nikhil Thakur, a hacker and Internet activist, broke into the Madhya Pradesh BSNL website and later on hacked the India BSNL website.

=== Cyberattack ===
In July 2017, BSNL suffered a cyberattack, in Karnataka, when malware affected the telco's broadband network using modems with default passwords. The virus reportedly affected 60,000 modems and blocked their internet connectivity. Later, BSNL issued an advisory notice to its broadband customers, urging them to change their default router username and passwords.

== See also ==
- Government of India
- BSNL Broadband
- BSNL Mobile
- Mahanagar Telephone Nigam Limited
- Telecommunications in India
- List of telecom companies in India
- List of mobile network operators
