= Excitel Broadband =

Indian telecommunications company

- Company type: Private
- Industry: Telecommunications
- Founded: 2015; 10 years ago
- Headquarters: Second & Third Floor, Plot No. 48, Okhla Industrial Estates, Phase-III, New Delhi, 110020
- Areas served: Delhi, Mumbai, Rajasthan, Uttar Pradesh, Bihar
- Services: FTTH; Internet service provider; Digital television; Leased line
- Website: Official website

Excitel Broadband Private Ltd., branded as Excitel, is an Indian telecommunications company headquartered in Okhla Industrial Estate in Okhla, Delhi, India. Excitel offers fibre to the home (FTTH) services under the brand name "Excitel broadband" and digital television services under the "Excitel TV" brand. The company provides services in Delhi, Uttar Pradesh, Bihar and Rajasthan
