= Hathway =

Indian cable TV service operator

- Type: Public
- Traded as: NSE: HATHWAY BSE: 533162
- Industry: Telecommunications
- Founded: 1993; 33 years ago
- Founder: Pheroza Billimoria; Roopesh Rao
- Headquarters: Mumbai, Maharashtra, India
- Area served: India
- Products: Cable television; Broadband Internet; Home networking; FTTH; Internet service provider
- Owner: Reliance Industries (71.95%)
- Website: www.hathway.com

Hathway Cable & Datacom Ltd, formerly BITV Cable Networks, is an Indian cable television and broadband service provider based in Mumbai. It was the first company to provide Internet using the CATV network in India, and the first cable operator to launch a digital platform in 2006. Hathway Broadband Internet was the first cable ISP in India. Business India Television (BITV) Cable Networks Pvt Ltd was acquired by Hathway in 1999. As of 2007, the company had a 51% stake in Bhupendran Bhaskar Multinet and a 50% stake in Gujarat Telelinks Pvt Ltd (GTPL). In 2011, Hathway GTPL entered Assam with an MoM with V&S Cable Pvt Ltd, and started operations in West Bengal as they acquired KCBPL (Kolkata Cable & Broadband Pariseva Ltd) to create a subsidiary, GTPLKCBPL, responsible for providing services in West Bengal.

== Other services ==
In the second half of 2011, Hathway launched its HDTV services in Mumbai, Hyderabad, Bangalore, Chennai, Indore, Kolkata; in Gujarat in 2013, and Odisha in 2015. Their new HD DVR set-top box initially provided 8 HD channels, with availability increasing to sixteen in March 2012. There are thirty channels available as of 2020. With this addition, Hathway is now the provider with the most HD channels in its Indian market.

Hathway Broadband Internet was one of the earliest cable ISP services in the Indian cities of Delhi, Mumbai, Indore, Bhopal, Lucknow and Kolkata. As of 2024, the highest possible speed provided via fiber is 300 Mbit/s. It uses Cisco's Docsis 3 technology in three cities, where the speeds exceed 50 Mbit/s.

There are around 11 million subscribers, of which around 1.77 million currently have wireless/broadband internet available. Approximately 430,000 of these users are using Hathway broadband services.

Hathway was the first Indian digital cable service provider to release digital video recorder (DVR) services, on March 12, 2009, powered by NDS XTV.

== Acquisition by Reliance Industries ==
Hathway was the multi-service operator owned by the Rajan Raheja Group. In 2003, it stood as one of the largest multi-system operators in India alongside the Hinduja Group companies of RPG Cable and InCablenet, and the Essel Group controlled Siti Networks, and also one of the three major cable distributors in India alongside DEN Networks and InCablenet.

On October 17, 2018, Reliance Industries announced that it had acquired a 51.34% stake in Hathway for ₹2,940 crore (US$310 million). The acquisition received approval from the Competition Commission of India in January 2019. Reliance acquired an additional 20.61% stake in Hathway through an open offer worth ₹1,180.42 crore (US$120 million) in March 2019, taking its total stake in the company to 71.95%.
