= BSNL Broadband =

Indian wireline broadband operator

- Formerly: DataOne
- Company type: Division of Bharat Sanchar Nigam Limited
- Industry: Telecommunications
- Founded: January 14, 2005; 21 years ago
- Headquarters: BSNL Bhavan, New Delhi, India
- Area served: India
- Key people: Shri Pravin Kumar Purwar; ITS(CEO)
- Services: Fixed line telephony; Wireless broadband; Wired broadband; Internet services
- Owner: Bharat Sanchar Nigam Limited
- Members: ▲22 Million+ (May 2019)
- Number of employees: 2,01,066 (2016)
- Website: bsnl.co.in

BSNL Broadband (formerly DataOne) is an Indian wireline broadband operator, a division of Bharat Sanchar Nigam Limited owned by Department of Telecommunications under Ministry of Communications of the Government of India. It provides both wired and wireless broadband services as well as many value-added services. BSNL Broadband launched its services on 14 January 2005 as Data One.

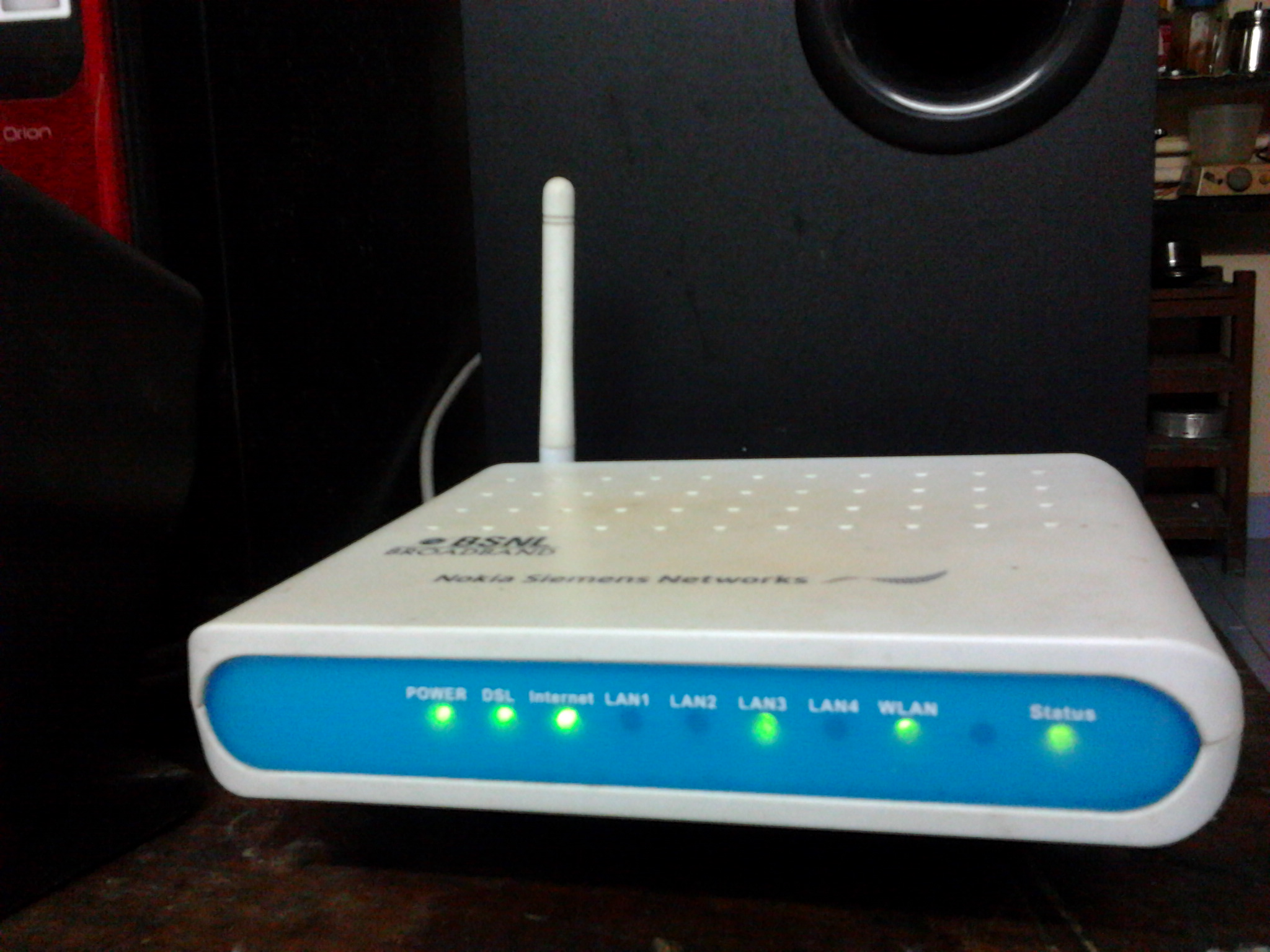
BSNL Broadband's Wi-Fi modem

BSNL is commissioning a multi-gigabit, multi-protocol, IP infrastructure through National Internet Backbone-II (NIB-II), that provides services through the same backbone and broadband access network. The broadband service is available on digital subscriber line technology (on the same wire that is used for old telephone service), spanning 198 cities.

The services that are supported include always-on broadband access to the Internet for residential and business customers, content-based services, video multicasting, Video on demand and interactive gaming, Conference call. In addition, Videotelephony, Voice over IP, Distance education, messaging, multi-site MPLS VPNs with Quality of Service (QoS) guarantees. The subscribers can access the above services through the Subscriber Service Selection System (SSSS) portal.

The service is given through Multiprotocol Label Switching (MPLS) based IP infrastructure. Layer 1 of the network consists of a high-speed backbone composed of 24 core routers connected with high-speed 2.0 Gbit/s(STM-16) links.
