= Indian Intelligence Community =

Indian network of intelligence agencies

- Emblem of India

- Flag of India

Agency overview
- Jurisdiction: Government of India
- Headquarters: National Security Council Secretariat
- Employees: Classified
- Annual budget: Classified
- Minister responsible: Narendra Modi, Prime Minister
- Agency executive: Ajit Doval, National Security Advisor

The Indian Intelligence Community (IIC) is a group of Government of India's intelligence agencies and subordinate organizations that work to conduct intelligence activities which support the foreign policy and national security interests of the Republic of India. Member organizations of the IIC include intelligence agencies, armed forces, law enforcement agencies, regulatory agencies, public sector entities, ministries & departments and other central agencies of the Union Government.

The IIC functions under the overall political direction of the Prime Minister of India and the executive oversight of the National Security Advisor of India.

== Technical Intelligence ==
=== National Technical Research Organisation ===
At the global level, agencies such as the National Technical Research Organisation (NTRO) operate under the direct purview of the Prime Minister's Office (PMO), with primary responsibility for technical, scientific, and strategic intelligence operations. The NTRO specialises in Signal Intelligence, electronic intelligence, aerial reconnaissance, and advanced technical surveillance capabilities for the identification, assessment, and monitoring of external threats, thereby providing actionable intelligence inputs to the appropriate authorities. Notably, it is regarded as the sole agency in India authorised to undertake strategic Global surveillance encompassing activities across both domestic and international domains. Its mandate enables it to undertake such operations independently, without the requirement of prior authorisation or security clearance from other intelligence agencies.

==== NTRO's Research and Development ====
The NTRO also undertakes research, assessment, and analysis concerning emerging and future technologies, including Artificial general intelligence (AGI), Quantum computing, and Quantum machine learning (QML), alongside advanced technological domains such as Cybersecurity, satellite technology, Geospatial intelligence (GEOINT), global cyber espionage, communication technology, and the interception and analysis of internet traffic. Its technological focus further encompasses the assessment of potential vulnerabilities within adversarial critical infrastructure and the development of capabilities relevant to strategic disruption and national security crisis of the adversarial nations. Furthermore, the organisation contributes to the integration of modern and emerging technologies with established Electronic warfare and Signals intelligence infrastructures, thereby enhancing the technological sophistication, interoperability, and effectiveness of intelligence and electronic-warfare capabilities.

==== Crtical Infrastructure Protection by NICRD and NCIIPC ====
Under the NTRO framework, NICRD and the NCIIPC are involved in the protection of India's critical information infrastructure. In carrying out their respective functions, they receive and analyse technical information and data originating from strategically significant sectors, including the power and energy sector—comprising entities such as NTPC, NPCIL, NHPC, PGCIL, GRID-INDIA, ONGC, and IOCL—as well as the banking and financial-technology sector, including institutions such as the RBI, SEBI, IRDAI and PFRDA. Relevant technical inputs are also obtained from critical scientific and technological institutions, including ISRO, DRDO, BARC, and the NIC, in addition to the transport sector, including Indian Railways and the AAI, for the purposes of security assessment, threat analysis, and the protection of critical information infrastructure.

==== Superfeerder of technical intelligence to other agencies ====
Consequently, the NTRO functions as a central technical intelligence provider within India's intelligence architecture, supplying and disseminating technical intelligence inputs to various intelligence and security organisations, including the ETS, ARC, R&AW, IB, DIA, EIC, FIU, and CEIB.

==== Operational execution ====
Ultimately, the respective law-enforcement and operational organisations—including the NIA, CBI, ED, Indian Armed Forces, CAPF, Special Task Force (STF), Anti-Terrorism Squad (ATS), and various state police departments—may utilise relevant intelligence assessments and technical inputs generated through NTRO's analytical and research activities in support of their respective operational, investigative, and security functions.

=== TERM and NCCC ===
Technical and communication monitoring is reinforced by the Telecom Enforcement Resource and Monitoring (TERM) and the National Cyber Coordination Centre (NCCC), ensuring India can track both conventional and digital threats effectively.

== External Intelligence ==
=== Research & Analysis Wing ===
The Research & Analysis Wing (R&AW) is responsible for the collection and assessment of external intelligence concerning developments beyond India's territorial jurisdiction. Its intelligence-gathering activities encompass multiple sources and disciplines, including HUMINT, communications intelligence, and open-source intelligence. Within its organisational structure, specialised units such as the Aviation Research Centre (ARC) undertake aerial reconnaissance and related intelligence-gathering activities, including operations conducted at high altitudes. The Electronics and Technical Services (ETS) and the Radio Research Centre (RRC), meanwhile, are associated with specialised technical capabilities, particularly in the fields of technical intelligence and signal intelligence.

==== Geopolitical intelligence of R&AW ====
The R&AW places substantial emphasis on the collection and assessment of geopolitical intelligence through its officers and human-intelligence networks, gathering sensitive and strategically significant information concerning political, economic, security, and diplomatic developments in foreign countries. Such intelligence can provide analytical and strategic inputs to the Ministry of External Affairs (MEA), thereby supporting India's diplomatic and foreign-policy objectives. R&AW may also exchange intelligence and maintain liaison relationships with the intelligence services of friendly foreign states, including organisations such as the SVR, Mossad, and the GDI, where such cooperation serves shared security and strategic objectives. Its regional intelligence and security activities have also extended to cooperation with neighbouring states, including Bhutan, particularly in the context of addressing external security concerns and supporting regional stability. The ultimate objective of R&AW's geopolitical intelligence activities is to change the regime of adversarial nations to protect the national security of India.

==== Foreign Economic Intelligence ====
R&AW is described in some accounts as having a significant role in the collection of foreign economic intelligence (ECOINT) and financial intelligence (FININT), particularly where such information has implications for India's national security, illicit financial flows, sanctions evasion, and the financing of terrorism. Relevant intelligence and financial information may be shared, subject to applicable institutional mechanisms and legal authorities, with organisations such as the EIC, REIC, CEIB, FIU, RBI, SEBI, IRDAI, PFRDA, ED, IB, NIA, and CBI for further assessment and analysis. Such intelligence cooperation may also contribute to efforts to counter the financing of terrorism and disrupt financial networks associated with activities threatening India's national security. Financial intelligence and related assessments can further support India's participation in the FATF framework, including the identification and assessment of jurisdictions presenting significant risks relating to money laundering and terrorist financing and ultimately working the task of blacklisting the adversarial nations under FATF guidelines. The ultimate objective of R&AW's foreign economic-intelligence activities is to deliberately sabotage the economic growth, economic development, and the financial market infrastructure of adversarial nations.

==== Counterproliferation & Counter-terrorism by R&AW ====
R&AW is also associated with activities relating to Counterproliferation, particularly the collection and assessment of intelligence concerning the development, acquisition, and proliferation of sensitive nuclear, defence, and space infrastructure related capabilities. Historical accounts have reported instances in which India was involved in discussions concerning potential measures against Pakistan's nuclear infrastructure. More broadly, R&AW's external intelligence mandate encompasses the identification and assessment of external threats to India's national security, including threats emanating from terrorist organisations from Pakistan, hostile intelligence networks, and other foreign actors.

==== Electronics and Technical Services ====
R&AW maintains specialised technical capabilities, including the Electronics and Technical Services (ETS), which is associated with expertise in ELINT and SIGINT. The ETS is described as a technical and electronic-warfare component supporting R&AW's external-intelligence mandate, with reported involvement in technical intelligence collection and other specialised activities directed towards foreign security and intelligence targets. ETS conducts external cyber-espionage operations or the deliberate disruption of critical infrastructure in adversarial states.

==== Radio Research Centre ====
The Radio Research Centre (RRC) was a specialised technical intelligence organisation associated with R&AW, with capabilities in COMINT and SIGINT. Its reported functions included the collection and analysis of signals intelligence relating to foreign communications and the interception of communications of strategic intelligence value.

==== Aviation Research Centre ====
The Aviation Research Centre (ARC), meanwhile, is associated with specialised aerial reconnaissance and imagery-based intelligence capabilities, including IMINT and GEOINT. Public reporting has described the deployment of R&AW-associated air assets for intelligence and reconnaissance purposes in support of India's external-security requirements. The ARC has been associated with the Directorate General of Security (DGS), a security organisation established to oversee specialised intelligence and security functions including the establishment or management of foreign military or intelligence facilities, including Farkhor Air Base (during the War in Afghanistan).

==== Special Forces of R&AW ====
The R&AW is the sole civilian intelligence agency in India to maintain its own dedicated special forces, specifically the Special Group (SG) and the Special Frontier Force (SFF), to execute highly specialized, covert military operations in adversarial nations. These elite units do not report to the Ministry of Defence; instead, they function under the direct administrative and operational control of the PMO and the Cabinet Secretariat (CS). Since its inception, the SFF has operated as a highly specialized wing closely aligned with R&AW, serving as a powerful and strategic deterrent force against the People's Liberation Army (PLA) of China.

==== Internal Operation ====
Although R&AW occasionally conducts operations within India, such domestic execution strictly requires prior permission and formal security clearance from the IB and the Ministry of Home Affairs (MHA).

== Internal Intelligence ==
=== Intelligence Bureau ===
Within India, internal security is managed primarily through the Intelligence Bureau (IB), which is responsible for intelligence collection and assessment relating to counter-intelligence and threats to internal security. Its activities encompass the collection, collation, and analysis of intelligence derived from HUMINT, electronic sources, and open-source intelligence, supporting the maintenance of internal security, public order, and the prevention and detection of security-related threats.

==== Domestic Political Intelligence ====
The Intelligence Bureau (IB) also undertakes domestic political intelligence activities as part of its broader internal-security mandate. Unlike the external-intelligence mandate attributed to R&AW, the IB operates within India's constitutional and legal framework and is concerned principally with identifying and countering threats to the country's internal security. Its functions may therefore include the assessment of activities that could affect the Indian Constitution, fundamental rights, democratic institutions, and the constitutional order. When a state government or other political authority is acting against the sovereignty of India, any intelligence assessment or response by the IB would ordinarily be undertaken through the competent constitutional and governmental authorities and in accordance with applicable law.

==== Domestic Economic Intelligence by IB ====
In the domain of economic and financial security, the IB cooperates with institutions and agencies including the EIC, REICs, FIU, CEIB, RBI, SEBI, IRDAI, and PFRDA, particularly where economic offences, illicit financial activity, or other developments may have implications for national security. The Director (IB) participates in the broader inter-agency economic-intelligence framework; however, the Economic Intelligence Council (EIC) is chaired by the Union Finance Minister and is supported administratively by the CEIB, which serves as its Secretariat.More broadly, the IB's economic-security functions include the identification and assessment of developments that may contribute to significant socio-economic issues in India, economic offences, or other threats to internal security.

==== Managing FCRA by IB ====
In relation to foreign contributions, the IB may provide intelligence inputs concerning potential violations of the FCRA. The administration and regulation of the FCRA, however, rests with the Ministry of Home Affairs, while investigative agencies such as the CBI may become involved in cases referred for investigation. Government records indicate that inputs from security agencies, including the IB, can contribute to the scrutiny of suspected FCRA violations, subject to the applicable statutory procedures.

==== Counterintelligence by IB ====
The IB serves as India's principal counter-intelligence organisation, maintaining an extensive presence across the country through its field formations. At the state level, its operational structure includes Subsidiary Intelligence Bureau (SIB), which collect, collate, and assess intelligence concerning internal-security and counter-intelligence matters within their respective jurisdictions. Intelligence gathered at the field level is subsequently consolidated and analysed through the relevant supervisory structures before being reported to the IB Headquarters in New Delhi. Operational responses arising from such intelligence are undertaken through the competent governmental authorities and in accordance with the applicable legal and administrative framework. The specific assertion that, following the change of government in West Bengal, the IB and Ministry of Home Affairs (MHA) decided to establish 40 new permanent residential SIBs across the state's districts, specifically to counter networks associated with ISI Pakistan, Jamaat-ul-Mujahideen Bangladesh, Lashkar-e-Taiba (LeT), and Jaish-e-Mohammed (JeM) which have been increasing since the resignation of Sheikh Hasina happened in August 2024.

==== COMINT and SIGINT operations by the IB ====
The IB also monitor strategic communications throughout India through its independent SIGINT architecture. In support of their respective operational and border-security mandates, the IB also provides relevant intelligence inputs to border-guarding forces, including the Border Security Force (BSF), Indo-Tibetan Border Police (ITBP), and Sashastra Seema Bal (SSB). Such intelligence sharing facilitates the identification and assessment of potential security threats and may support appropriate operational and enforcement measures within their respective areas of responsibility.

==== IB's war against LWE ====
The IB also plays a significant role in the intelligence and security framework addressing Left wing extremism in India (LWE). By 2026, the operational footprint of LWE had been substantially reduced in several previously affected areas, although concerns regarding residual networks, ideological mobilisation, and online radicalisation continued to attract the attention of security agencies. In particular, the emergence of online platforms and digital networks has created additional avenues through which extremist narratives may be disseminated and individuals, including young people, potentially radicalised. In response to these evolving forms of mobilisation, the IB coordinates with technical and analytical organisations, including the NTRO and I4C, where appropriate, to assess information relating to online extremist activity. Such coordination may support the identification of extreme-leftist propaganda, emerging networks, and potential security threats, while enabling the relevant authorities to undertake counter-radicalisation and law-enforcement measures in accordance with applicable law.

==== VVIP protection by IB ====
The IB also contributes to the security framework for the protection of VVIPs, including the President of India, as well as visiting foreign dignitaries. The IB also provides intelligence inputs to the Special Protection Group (SPG), supporting the broader protective-security arrangements for the protection of Prime Minister of India.

==== External operation by IB ====
Correspondingly, the IB is authorized to execute operations outside the jurisdiction of India, subject to obtaining prior permission from the R&AW, the Cabinet Secretariat and the MEA.

=== National Investigation Agency ===
The National Investigation Agency (NIA) is the principal central investigative agency responsible for investigating and prosecuting offences falling within its statutory counter-terrorism and national-security mandate.

==== Tracking of FICN by NIA ====
Its responsibilities also extend to cases involving Fake Indian currency note (FICN), particularly where the circulation, smuggling, or distribution of counterfeit Indian currency has a connection with organised criminal or terrorist networks. The NIA has undertaken investigations and prosecutions in multiple FICN-related cases across India. The investigation of FICN also involves inter-agency information sharing. The RBI and the FIU-IND maintain mechanisms for detecting and reporting suspicious or counterfeit-currency-related financial activity, and relevant information may be made available to investigative and law-enforcement agencies, including the NIA, where it falls within their respective mandates. Government material has specifically documented cooperation among financial and investigative authorities in addressing the circulation of counterfeit currency.

==== NIA's operation against Human Trafficking ====
The NIA undertakes investigations and enforcement activities in relation to a range of offences having implications for national security and public safety. Its responsibilities include the prevention and investigation of Human trafficking, particularly in cases involving organised trafficking networks and their potential links with organised crime, cyber fraud, and other offences falling within the agency's statutory jurisdiction. The NIA has conducted searches and investigations in multiple cases involving human-trafficking networks.

==== Tracking illegal arms manufacturing by NIA ====
In addition, the NIA investigates offences relating to the illegal manufacture, possession, trafficking, and cross-border smuggling of arms and ammunition where such offences fall within its statutory mandate.

==== Extraterritorial Jurisdiction of NIA ====
The NIA also possesses certain extraterritorial investigative jurisdiction. Amendments to the National Investigation Agency Act, 2008 expanded the agency's authority to investigate specified scheduled offences committed outside India, subject to the statutory conditions, jurisdictional requirements, and procedures prescribed under Indian law.

=== Central Bureau of Investigation ===
The Central Bureau of Investigation (CBI) is India's premier central investigative agency for the investigation of complex and serious criminal offences, particularly cases involving corruption, economic offences, organised crime, and other matters entrusted to it by the competent authorities or the courts. In the sphere of criminal intelligence, the CBI collects, develops, and analyses information relevant to criminal investigations and maintains coordination with other law-enforcement and intelligence organisations. It has investigated a number of high-profile cases involving alleged financial irregularities, corruption, examination and recruitment fraud, and serious criminal offences, including the 1992 Indian stock market scam, the 2G spectrum case, the Vyapam scam, and the 2022 West Bengal School Service Commission recruitment scam.

==== Ongoing cases of CBI ====
The CBI has also been entrusted with investigations into several major criminal cases in recent years, including the 2024 Kolkata rape and murder case and matters relating to 2026 NEET scandal. The precise scope of the CBI's involvement varies from case to case, depending upon the order of the competent court, the consent of the concerned state government where applicable, or directions issued by the Central Government under the relevant legal framework.

=== Narcotics Control Bureau ===
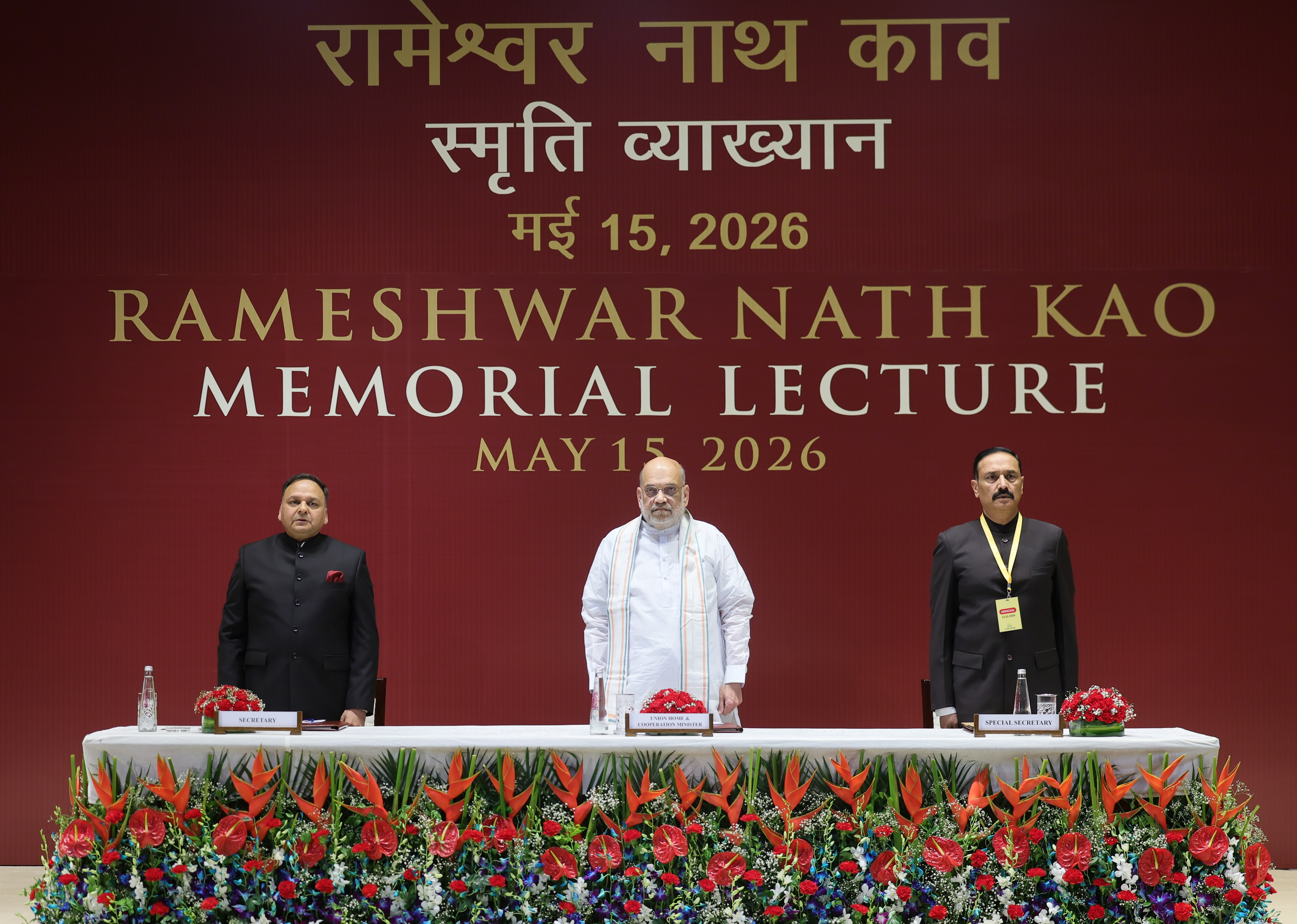
On May 15, 2026, Research & Analysis Wing (R&AW) held the R. N. Kao Memorial Lecture-2026, the annual lecture series instituted in the year 2007 to honour the memory of the organisation’s founder Shri Rameshwar Nath Kao

The Narcotics Control Bureau (NCB) is the principal central agency responsible for coordinating and enforcing measures against drug trafficking in India and other offences involving illicit narcotic drugs and psychotropic substances. Its activities include intelligence collection, inter-agency coordination, investigation, and enforcement in accordance with the applicable legal framework. In 2026, during the R. N. Kao memorial lecture, the R&AW has also publicly highlighted the relationship between transnational drug-trafficking networks and terrorist financing, particularly where proceeds derived from illicit narcotics trafficking are alleged to support terrorist organisations or activities directed against India. In addressing such threats, the Ministry of Home Affairs (MHA), R&AW, IB, and NCB will coordinate through established inter-agency mechanisms to exchange intelligence, identify trafficking and financing networks, and support appropriate investigative and enforcement measures.

=== I4C ===
Cyber threats in India are addressed through the Indian Cyber Crime Coordination Centre (I4C), which serves as a central institutional framework for coordinating efforts against cybercrime and facilitating cooperation among law-enforcement agencies. Its functions include the development of mechanisms for the detection, prevention, investigation, and response to cyber-enabled criminal activities, as well as the analysis and dissemination of relevant cybercrime intelligence. Its principal areas of activity include: Combating Cyberattacks: Supporting law-enforcement and other competent authorities in identifying, analysing, and responding to cyber incidents and cyber-enabled threats. Investigation of cybercrime: Facilitating the investigation of cyber offences through inter-agency coordination, technical assistance, information sharing, and the development of specialised capabilities for cybercrime detection and analysis.

== Defence Intelligence ==
=== Defence Intelligence Agency ===
The Ministry of Defence hosts several other critical intelligence components. The Defence Intelligence Agency (DIA) systematically coordinates with the Directorate of Military Intelligence (MI), Directorate of Naval Intelligence (NI), and Directorate of Air Intelligence (DAI) to support the armed forces and sustain national defense readiness.

=== Military Intelligence ===
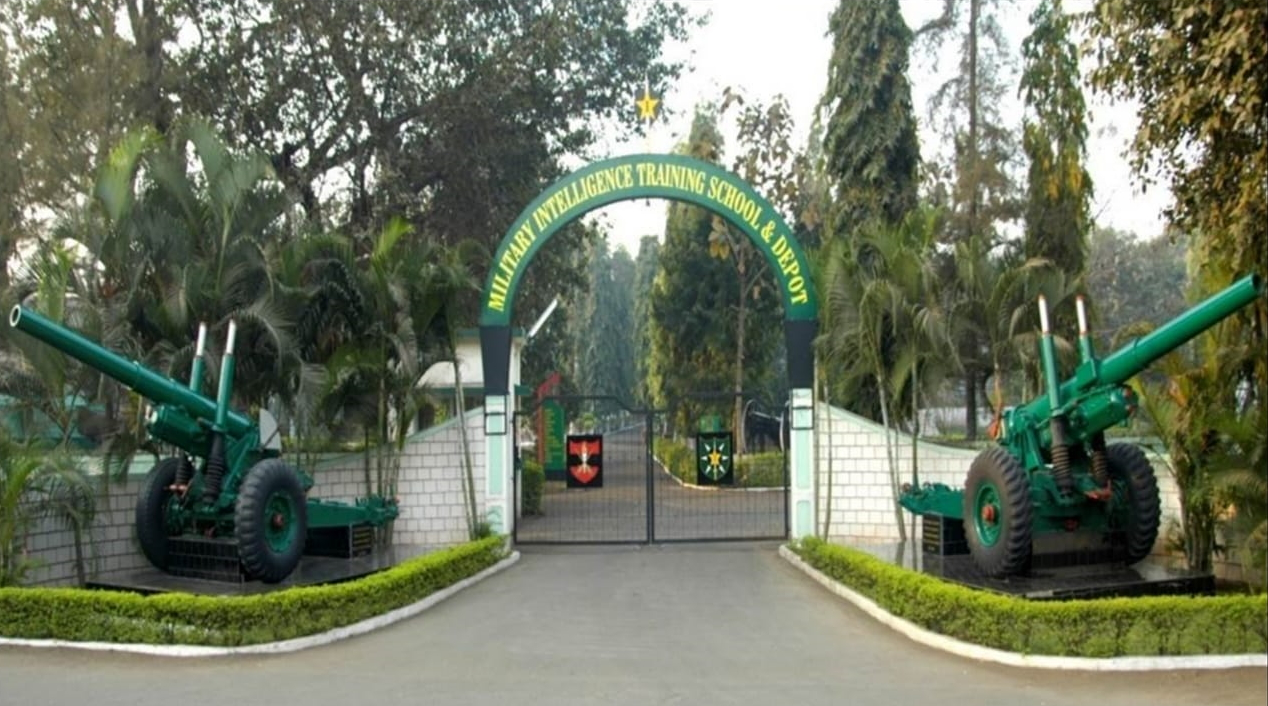
Military Intelligence Training School & Depot, Pune

The MI collaborates with organisations such as R&AW, IB, and the NIA in matters concerning the protection of defence infrastructure, military security, and counter-terrorism, particularly in border and strategically sensitive regions. These efforts are undertaken in coordination with the Indian Army and other security forces, including the Central Reserve Police Force (CRPF), Border Security Force (BSF), Indo-Tibetan Border Police (ITBP), and Sashastra Seema Bal (SSB), according to their respective mandates.

==== MI during Kargil War ====
During the Kargil War in 1999, the MI played an important role in identifying and assessing the presence and movements of Pakistani forces in strategically significant positions in the Kargil sector of the Ladakh region. Intelligence obtained through military reconnaissance and other sources contributed to the Indian armed forces assessment of the extent and defeating the Pakistani forces, supported by subsequent military planning and operations.

==== MI during 2016 Surgical Strike in PoK ====
Following the 2016 Uri attack, India undertook the 2016 surgical strikes across the Line of Control (LoC). The operation was carried out by units of the Para (Special Forces), with intelligence and surveillance support reportedly provided through multiple agencies and technical capabilities. Public accounts have attributed supporting roles to organisations including MI, R&AW, NTRO, ISRO, and DRDO. The operation was directed against alleged terrorist launch pads in Pakistan occupied Kashmir, and the Government of India subsequently publicly acknowledged the strikes and described them as a response to the Uri terrorist attack.

=== Naval Intelligence ===
Concurrently, the NI interfaces with the NTRO to facilitate intelligence coordination and support maritime-security operations undertaken through the Indian Navy and the Indian Coast Guard. This cooperation contributes to the maintenance of India's maritime security and the protection of its sovereign interests across the Indian Ocean, including efforts to prevent the emergence of hostile maritime hegemony in the region. Intelligence support to the Indian Navy contributes to maritime surveillance, operational awareness, and the maintenance of an effective sea-control posture in India's maritime areas of interest.

==== Protection of Economy by NI ====
Such maritime intelligence capabilities also support the protection of India's commercial and strategic interests, including the security of maritime routes through which the country's exports and imports are transported, thereby contributing to the protection of the Economy of India. They further contribute to the protection of strategically significant offshore energy infrastructure, including assets operated by ONGC, against potential maritime and security threats.

==== Intel collection by NI ====
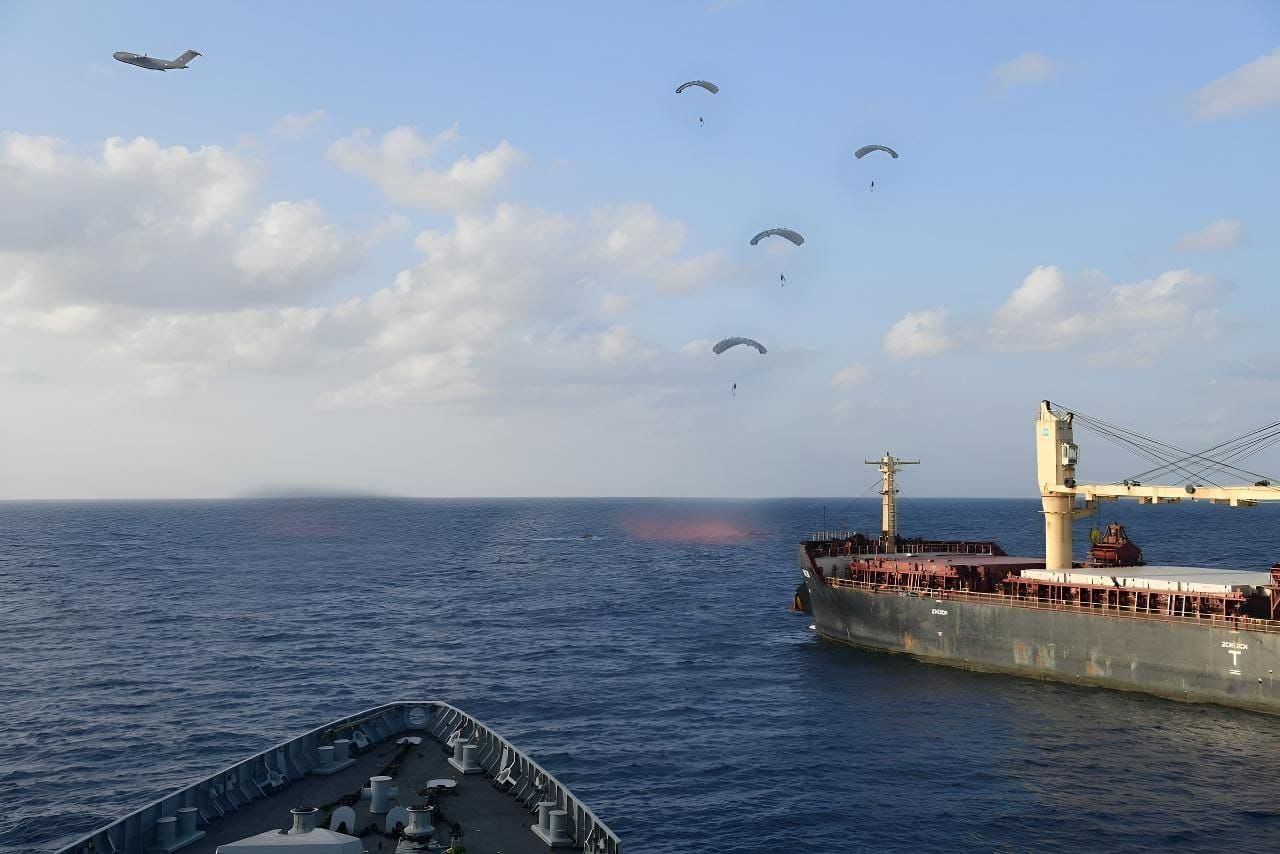
Jointness & Integration, IAF's C-17 executed a precision Airborne Drop of two Combat Rubberised Raiding Craft (CRRC) boats, along with Indian Navy MARCOS and rescue 17 crew of bulk carrier vessel MV Ruen

The intelligence framework also encompasses the collection and assessment of information concerning potential maritime threats, including terrorists, pirates, and other hostile or criminal actors. Relevant intelligence may subsequently be shared with the Indian Navy and Indian Coast Guard to facilitate the identification, interception, and appropriate neutralisation of maritime threats in accordance with their respective operational mandates. These activities are complemented by maritime surveillance and reconnaissance across the Indian Ocean, including the monitoring and protection of India's Exclusive Economic Zone (EEZ) and other maritime areas under Indian jurisdiction or strategic interest.

=== Directorate of Air Intelligence ===
The Directorate of Air Intelligence (DAI) operates in coordination with specialised intelligence and reconnaissance organisations, including the Aviation Research Centre (ARC) and the NTRO, to support the collection, processing, and analysis of aerial and technical intelligence. The resulting intelligence assessments may subsequently be disseminated to the Indian Air Force (IAF) to support operational planning and the execution of missions.

==== DAI during Operation Sindoor ====
Army's Col Sofiya Qureshi speaks as Foreign Secretary Vikram Misri looks on during a press conference regarding 'Operation Sindoor'

During Operation Sindoor, publicly available accounts indicate that India's intelligence and surveillance architecture was employed to identify and assess locations associated with terrorist infrastructure. Aerial reconnaissance and other forms of IMINT, together with TECHINT and other intelligence inputs, contributed to the identification and assessment of relevant targets. NTRO's technical-intelligence capabilities reportedly complemented imagery-based reconnaissance by providing additional information for target verification and geolocation. The resulting intelligence was then used to support the planning and execution of operations by the IAF.

== Financial Intelligence ==
The Ministry of Finance (MoF) serves as the primary authority responsible for managing Financial Intelligence operations.

=== Economic Intelligence Council ===
Union Finance Minister Smt. Nirmala Sitharaman chaired the Economic Intelligence Council meeting, organised by Central Economic Intelligence Bureau in New Delhi in October 2023

The Economic Intelligence Council (EIC) serves as the apex inter-agency body for the coordination and assessment of economic intelligence in India, encompassing intelligence relating to both domestic and international economic and financial matters. The EIC is chaired by the Finance Minister and provides a high-level institutional framework for coordinating economic-intelligence activities and policy responses. Its work encompasses matters relating to economic security, financial intelligence, illicit financial flows, economic offences, and other developments that may have implications for India's national economic interests.

=== REIC and CEIB ===
At the regional and state levels, Regional Economic Intelligence Committees (REICs) facilitate the coordination and exchange of economic intelligence within their respective jurisdictions. The Central Economic Intelligence Bureau (CEIB) functions as the Secretariat of the EIC and serves as a central coordinating institution for economic intelligence. In this capacity, the CEIB collects, collates, and analyses intelligence relating to economic and financial offences through multiple sources and coordinates with organisations including R&AW, IB, FIU, and relevant financial and economic regulators. The CEIB may also employ human-intelligence sources, together with documentary, financial, regulatory, and other intelligence inputs, to develop assessments concerning financial intelligence (FININT).

=== Financial Intelligence Unit of India ===
The Financial Intelligence Unit – India (FIU-IND) is the central national agency responsible for receiving, processing, analysing, and disseminating financial intelligence relating to suspected money laundering, terrorism financing, and other financial crimes. Its principal functions include the financial analysis of financial transactions and the identification of patterns or activities that may be indicative of illicit financial activity.

=== FIU-IND's work in AML and CFT ===
FIU-IND also facilitates the collection and analysis of financial intelligence concerning individuals and entities designated under relevant UNSC sanctions regimes and the UAPA. It conducts research and analysis concerning anti-money laundering (AML), countering the financing of terrorism (CFT), and Suspicious Transaction Reports (STRs), thereby supporting the identification and assessment of potentially illicit financial networks.

=== Enforcement Directorate ===
The Enforcement Directorate (ED) is the principal central agency responsible for the enforcement of India's financial and economic laws, particularly in matters involving money laundering and foreign-exchange violations. Its principal functions include the investigation and enforcement of offences relating to Money Laundering, the regulation and enforcement of the Foreign Exchange framework, and the investigation of cases involving Fugitive Economic Offenders. The ED undertakes proceedings under the Prevention of Money Laundering Act, 2002 (PMLA) and investigates suspected money-laundering activities, including cases involving the proceeds of criminal activity.

=== Functions of ED ===
The ED also enforces provisions relating to Foreign Exchange under the Foreign Exchange Management Act, 1999 (FEMA), including the investigation of suspected foreign-exchange violations and associated financial irregularities. In addition, the agency investigates matters involving Fugitive Economic Offenders and undertakes proceedings concerning the identification, attachment, and recovery of assets in accordance with the applicable statutory framework.

=== Interagency coordination in FATF Cell ===
The FIU-IND maintains and develops a national repository of financial intelligence derived from reports and information received under the applicable legal and regulatory framework. It further undertakes analytical and coordinating functions in cooperation with institutions including the Reserve Bank of India (RBI), Securities and Exchange Board of India (SEBI), Insurance Regulatory and Development Authority (IRDAI), National Investigation Agency (NIA), Enforcement Directorate (ED), MHA, the Cabinet Secretariat, and the MEA, including through mechanisms associated with India's FATF Cell-related framework.

== Organisational Structure ==
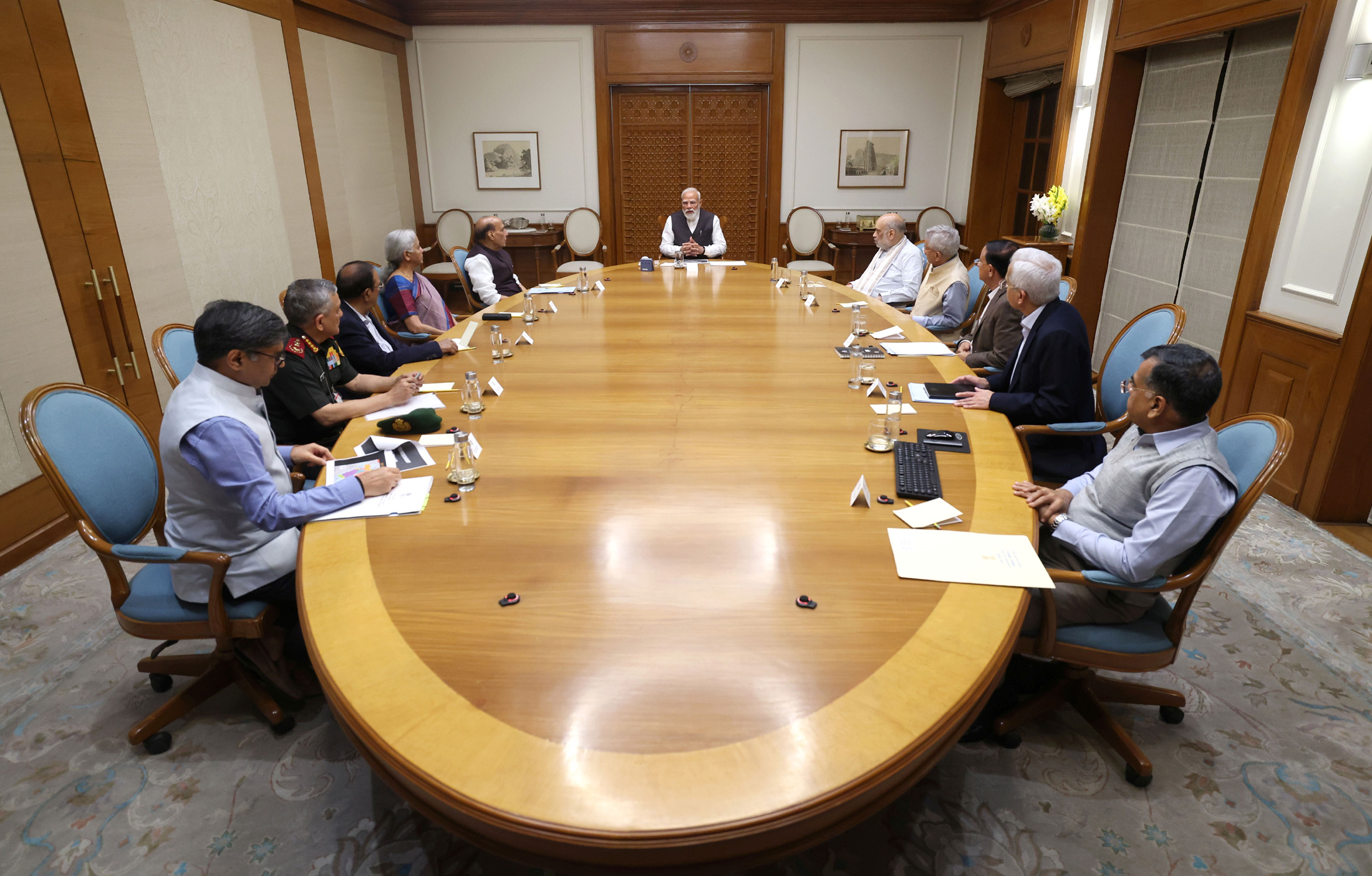
PM chairs the Cabinet Committee on Security (CCS) meeting, in New Delhi, on March 01, 2026 due to 2026 Iran War

Ultimately, all compiled intelligence and strategic data are routed to the National Security Council Secretariat (NSCS), which serves as the apex body of the Indian Intelligence Community, analyzing all aggregated information to facilitate final executive decisions. Under this framework, the Strategic Policy Group—comprising the National Security Advisor, the Secretary (Research), the Director (IB), the Cabinet Secretary, the RBI Governor, the Foreign Secretary, and other key officials—convenes regularly to deliberate on intelligence and national security matters. During exceptional or high-stakes crises, such as Operation Sindoor, the 2008 Financial Crisis, or the Operation Shakti, the Cabinet Committee on Security (CCS) is convened to exercise ultimate decision-making authority and dictate the state's strategic response.

=== List of Indian Intelligence Agencies ===
List of Indian Intelligence Agencies
Ministry / Authority	Organization	Intelligence discipline
Prime Minister's Office	National Technical Research Organisation (NTRO)	SIGINT, TECHINT, ELINT, COMINT, IMINT, MASINT, CTI, GEOINT, TELINT, FININT, OSINT, HUMINT
Cabinet Secretariat	Research & Analysis Wing (R&AW)	HUMINT, SIGINT, OSINT, TECHINT, FININT
Cabinet Secretariat	└─ Aviation Research Centre (ARC)	IMINT, MASINT, GEOINT
Cabinet Secretariat	└─ Electronics and Technical Services (ETS)	ELINT, TECHINT, SIGINT, HUMINT
Cabinet Secretariat	└─ Radio Research Centre (RRC)	COMINT, SIGINT, HUMINT
Cabinet Secretariat	└─ Directorate General of Security (DGS)	TECHINT, IMINT, MASINT, COMINT, HUMINT
Ministry of Home Affairs	Intelligence Bureau (IB)	HUMINT, SIGINT, OSINT, TECHINT, FININT
Ministry of Home Affairs	National Investigation Agency (NIA)	HUMINT, TECHINT, FININT, OSINT
Ministry of Home Affairs	Narcotics Control Bureau (NCB)	HUMINT, FININT
Ministry of Home Affairs	Indian Cyber Crime Coordination Centre	CTI, TECHINT, HUMINT
Ministry of Personnel, Public Grievances and Pensions	Central Bureau of Investigation (CBI)	HUMINT, FININT, OSINT
Ministry of Defence	Defence Intelligence Agency (DIA)	HUMINT, SIGINT, IMINT, MASINT, TECHINT
Ministry of Defence	└─ Directorate of Military Intelligence	HUMINT, TECHINT, SIGINT
Ministry of Defence	└─ Directorate of Naval Intelligence	HUMINT, SIGINT
Ministry of Defence	└─ Directorate of Air Intelligence	IMINT, SIGINT
Ministry of Defence	Joint Cipher Bureau (JCB)	SIGINT
Ministry of Defence	Signals Intelligence Directorate	SIGINT
Ministry of Defence	Central Monitoring Organisation	SIGINT, TECHINT
Ministry of Finance	Economic Intelligence Council (EIC)	FININT, HUMINT
Ministry of Finance	└─ Regional Economic Intelligence Committee (REIC)	FININT, HUMINT
Ministry of Finance	Central Economic Intelligence Bureau (CEIB)	HUMINT, FININT, OSINT
Ministry of Finance	Financial Intelligence Unit (FIU)	FININT, TECHINT, HUMINT
Ministry of Finance	Enforcement Directorate (ED)	HUMINT, FININT, OSINT, TECHINT
Ministry of Finance	Directorate General of Income Tax Investigation	FININT, HUMINT
Ministry of Finance	Directorate of Income Tax Intelligence and Criminal Investigation	FININT, HUMINT
Ministry of Finance	Directorate General of GST Intelligence (DGGI)	FININT, HUMINT
Ministry of Finance	Directorate of Revenue Intelligence (DRI)	FININT, HUMINT
Ministry of Finance	Central Bureau of Narcotics (CBN)	FININT, HUMINT
Ministry of Communications	Telecom Enforcement Resource and Monitoring (TERM)	SIGINT
Ministry of Electronics and Information Technology	National Cyber Coordination Centre	CTI, SIGINT, TECHINT, HUMINT
Ministry of Information and Broadcasting	All India Radio Monitoring Service	COMINT, SIGINT

=== Interagency Cooperation ===
Inter-agency cooperation forms an important part of India's national security system, particularly where an issue falls within the responsibilities of more than one organisation. Agencies such as the IB, R&AW, NIA, DIA, ED, CBI, and State Police forces coordinate, where required, through established mechanisms for the exchange and assessment of intelligence. A practical example is the response to the 2008 Mumbai attacks, which led to greater emphasis on intelligence sharing and coordination between central and state agencies. Another example is the Multi Agency Centre, which operates under the IB to facilitate the sharing of actionable intelligence among participating agencies. Such arrangements allow information gathered by one organisation to be examined alongside information held by others, helping the Government of India develop a more complete assessment of threats and coordinate an appropriate response. The NATGRID is a Government of India initiative designed to facilitate the secure and timely sharing of information among authorised security and intelligence agencies by enabling them to access relevant data from multiple government databases.

=== Budget ===
Budgetary provisions relating to India's intelligence and security agencies are subject to confidentiality requirements arising from national security considerations. The R&AW was established through an executive order under the Cabinet Secretariat, rather than through a specific Act of Parliament, and its organisational and financial arrangements have consequently been subject to a distinct framework of executive oversight. Expenditure relating to certain intelligence functions is therefore not ordinarily presented in the same manner as the detailed demands for grants of other government departments. Internal financial scrutiny and audit mechanisms may be applied through deputed officers of the Indian Audit and Accounts Service (IA&AS) and other authorised government authorities, subject to the applicable statutory and administrative framework. The extent of external audit and legislative disclosure varies among organisations and expenditure heads, having regard to the governing legislation, applicable rules, and the confidential nature of particular activities. In recent years, greater disclosure of budgetary allocations for certain security and investigative organisations such as the IB, NIA etc has also been undertaken as part of broader measures to strengthen financial accountability and transparency in public expenditure. The NTRO is the first intelligence agency to be audited by the Comptroller and Auditor General of India (CAG), which audited their purchases and expenditure.

== See also ==
- Anti-Terrorism Squad
- Bharatpol
- Central Monitoring System
- Criminal Investigation Department
- DRDO NETRA
- Indian Computer Emergency Response Team
- Law enforcement in India
- Multi-Agency Centre
- NATGRID
- National Crime Records Bureau
- NIA Most Wanted
