= S.N. Pradhan =

Director general of police

Director General of Narcotics Control Bureau (NCB)
- In office 15 November 2021 – 31 August 2024
- Preceded by: Rakesh Asthana
- Succeeded by: Anurag Garg

Director General of National Disaster Response Force (NDRF)
- In office 22 January 2019 – 14 November 2021
- Preceded by: Sanjay Kumar IPS
- Succeeded by: Atul Karwal

Joint Secretary Ministry of Development of North Eastern Region
- In office August 2016 – January 2019

Personal details
- Born: Satya Narayan Pradhan; 6 August 1964 (age 61)
- Education: MPhil, LLM
- Alma mater: Hyderabad University, Jawaharlal Nehru University, University of Essex
- Awards: President's Police Medal for Distinguished Service Police Medal for Meritorious Service

Satya Narayan Pradhan (6 August 1964) better known as S.N. Pradhan or Satya Pradhan is former Director General of Narcotics Control Bureau and a retired IPS officer of the 1988 batch from Jharkhand cadre.

He is the former Joint Secretary, Ministry of Development of North Eastern Region. While Pradhan is a native of Odisha he is born in Patna, Bihar.

He also served as a senior IPS officer at Odisha State.

Pradhan earlier worked as Assistant Director and Deputy Director at the Sardar Vallabhbhai Patel National Police Academy, Hyderabad and trained 6 batches of IPS officers.

Prior to join SVPNPA he worked as Superintendent of Police and Additional Director General of Police (Law & Order) in various districts of Bihar state.

== Decorations ==
- President's Police Medal for Distinguished Service - Received in 2012
- Police Medal for Meritorious Service - Received in 2006
- President’s Police Medal for Gallantry - Received in

== Awards ==
- Queen's Award 2008 for Innovation in Policing by the Government of UK
