= Electronics and Technical Services =

Classified government agency in India

- Emblem of the Government of India

Agency overview
- Formed: Mid 1980s (approx.)
- Employees: Classified
- Annual budget: Classified
- Agency executive: Additional Secretary (R)
- Parent department: Cabinet Secretariat
- Parent agency: Research and Analysis Wing (R&AW)

The Electronics and Technical Services (ETS) is the electronic intelligence arm of India's external intelligence agency Research and Analysis Wing (R&AW).

== Background ==
Established in the mid-1980s under the then Research and Analysis Wing (R&AW) chief N. F. Suntook, the Electronics and Technical Services (ETS), it is housed in the CGO complex in New Delhi. ETS is believed to be involved in ELINT roles, not restricted but also includes jamming and spoofing - electronic warfare (EW). ETS is also involved in electronic surveillance measures (ESMs), telemetry (TELINT), tracking and monitoring data links, interception and monitoring of navigation signals and other ELINT and EW methods.

== Organisation ==
The head of R&AW is designated Secretary (R) in the Cabinet Secretariat. Two Special Joint secretaries, reporting to the Additional secretary, head the Electronics and Technical Department which is the nodal agency for the ETS and the Radio Research Centre (RRC) are under the direct command of the Secretary (R).

Officers of the R&AW are members of a specialized service, the Research and Analysis Service (RAS), but several officers also serve on deputation from other services. This applies to RAW's sub-organizations like the Aviation Research Centre (ARC), the Radio Research Centre (RRC) or the Electronics and Technical Service (ETS).

However exact nature of the operations conducted by the ETS is classified.

== See also ==
- National Technical Research Organisation
- Indian Intelligence Community
