= Directorate of Air Intelligence =

Intelligence directorate of the Indian Air Force

- Crest of the Indian Air Force
- Country: India
- Branch: Indian Air Force
- Type: Military intelligence
- Role: Air intelligence and intelligence support
- Headquarters: Air Headquarters, New Delhi

The Directorate of Air Intelligence (DAI) is the air-intelligence directorate of the Indian Air Force (IAF). It forms part of the staff structure at Air Headquarters and supports the intelligence requirements of Indian Air Force operations.

Senior appointments associated with the air-intelligence organisation include the Assistant Chief of the Air Staff (Intelligence) (ACAS (Int)) at Air Headquarters. Official Indian Air Force and Ministry of Defence biographies have also referred to the appointment of Director Intelligence at Air Headquarters.

== Organisation ==
The Directorate of Air Intelligence functions within the Air Headquarters structure of the Indian Air Force.

The Assistant Chief of the Air Staff (Intelligence) is one of the senior intelligence appointments at Air Headquarters. A number of senior IAF officers who later reached higher command appointments have served in the position.

Former Chief of the Air Staff S. P. Tyagi served as Assistant Chief of the Air Staff (Intelligence). Air Chief Marshal N. A. K. Browne also served as ACAS (Intelligence) at Air Headquarters before subsequently becoming Chief of the Air Staff.

Air Chief Marshal B. S. Dhanoa held the posts of Director Targeting Cell, Director Fighter Operations and Assistant Chief of Air Staff (Intelligence) during his career at Air Headquarters.

Air Marshal S. Prabhakaran similarly served as Assistant Chief of Air Staff Intelligence before later holding senior command appointments.

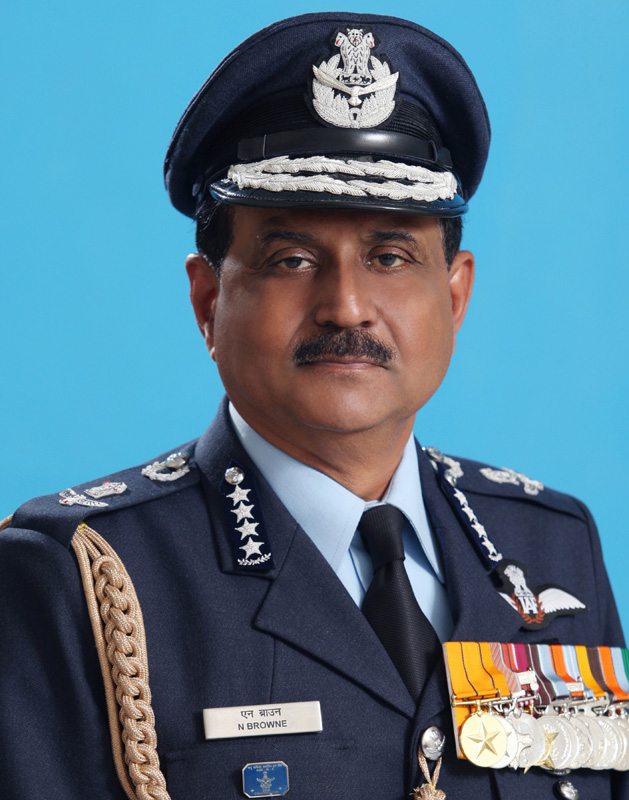
Air Chief Marshal N. A. K. Browne, a former Assistant Chief of the Air Staff (Intelligence), later served as Chief of the Air Staff.

== Air intelligence and reconnaissance ==
Intelligence gathering, surveillance and aerial reconnaissance have formed an important part of Indian Air Force operations.

During the Indo-Pakistani war of 1965, IAF photo-reconnaissance aircraft conducted missions over strategically important areas. According to the Indian Air Force's official history of its operations, Canberra photo-reconnaissance missions gathered information concerning fortifications, bridges and Pakistani military preparations. The information obtained from these missions was subsequently used for planning air operations.

Aerial reconnaissance remained an important intelligence source as the IAF introduced more specialised aircraft and sensors.

=== MiG-25 reconnaissance operations ===
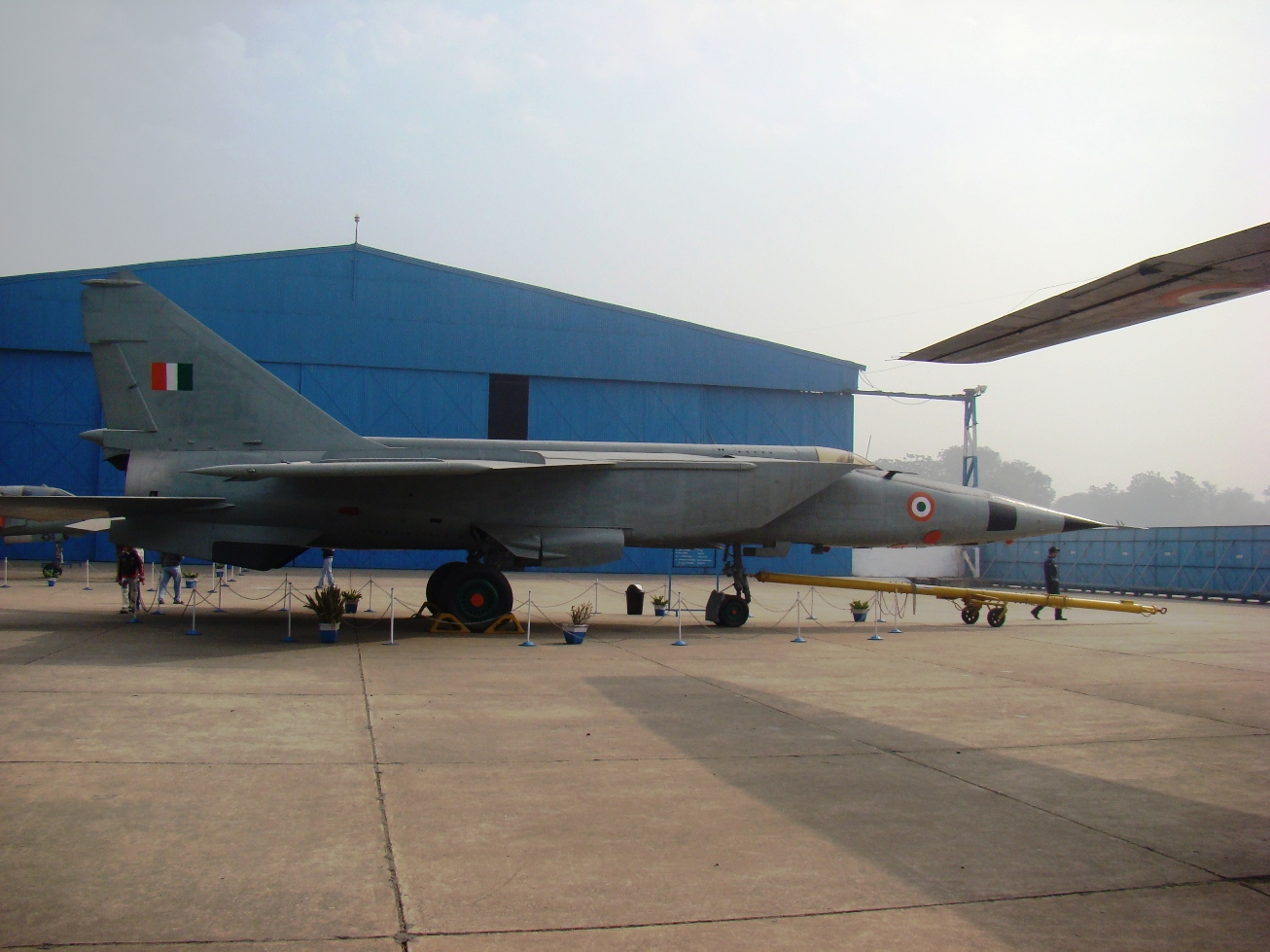
A former Indian Air Force MiG-25, a type used by the IAF for high-altitude photo reconnaissance, displayed at the Indian Air Force Museum, Palam.

The Indian Air Force operated reconnaissance versions of the Mikoyan-Gurevich MiG-25 for high-altitude photographic reconnaissance. During the Kargil War in 1999, photo-reconnaissance sorties flown by MiG-25 and Canberra aircraft of Central Air Command provided intelligence concerning targets in the operational area.

The IAF's account of Operation Safed Sagar also records that reconnaissance helped identify changes in supply routes used by opposing forces, enabling subsequent air attacks against those routes.

== Surveillance and reconnaissance units ==
The intelligence function of the Indian Air Force is supported by operational surveillance and reconnaissance units.

In September 2004, the Indian Air Force formed No. 3004 Squadron at Nalia with the designated task of conducting intelligence gathering through surveillance and reconnaissance in the Kutch sector.

The Ministry of Defence stated in 2010 that the squadron had provided real-time imagery and intelligence concerning incursions into Indian territory and had supported missions involving the Indian Army, Indian Navy, Indian Coast Guard and Border Security Force. The squadron received a Chief of the Air Staff Unit Citation for its operational performance.

== Intelligence training and space-based imagery ==
The Indian Air Force has expanded its institutional capabilities for processing intelligence obtained from space-based and remotely operated systems.

On 1 July 2024, the IAF inaugurated the Weapon Systems School at Air Force Station Begumpet in Hyderabad. The school introduced four streams within the IAF's Weapon Systems Branch, including an Intelligence stream responsible for handling space-based intelligence and imagery.

The other streams cover airborne weapon-system operators, remotely piloted aircraft and surface-based weapon systems. The creation of a dedicated Intelligence stream represented an expansion of specialised training for personnel handling space-derived information and imagery within the Indian Air Force.

== Notable former intelligence officers ==
Several officers who served in senior air-intelligence appointments subsequently occupied senior leadership positions in the Indian Air Force.

| Officer | Intelligence appointment | Later senior appointment |
|---|---|---|
| Air Chief Marshal S. P. Tyagi | Assistant Chief of the Air Staff (Intelligence) | Chief of the Air Staff |
| Air Chief Marshal N. A. K. Browne | Assistant Chief of the Air Staff (Intelligence) | Chief of the Air Staff |
| Air Chief Marshal B. S. Dhanoa | Assistant Chief of the Air Staff (Intelligence) | Chief of the Air Staff |
| Air Marshal S. Prabhakaran | Assistant Chief of the Air Staff Intelligence | Air Officer Commanding-in-Chief, Western Air Command |

== Relationship with defence intelligence ==
The Directorate of Air Intelligence is one of the service-specific intelligence organisations of the Indian Armed Forces. At the tri-service level, defence-intelligence coordination is undertaken through the Defence Intelligence Agency within the Integrated Defence Staff.

Other service intelligence organisations include:

- Directorate of Military Intelligence of the Indian Army
- Directorate of Naval Intelligence of the Indian Navy

== See also ==
- Indian Air Force
- Defence Intelligence Agency (India)
- Integrated Defence Staff
- Directorate of Military Intelligence (India)
- Directorate of Naval Intelligence (India)
- Intelligence, surveillance, target acquisition, and reconnaissance
- List of Indian intelligence agencies
