= Mohan Narayan Rao Samant =

Indian Naval officer and MVC recipient

M N R Samant MVC
- Born: 1930
- Died: 20 March 2019
- Military career
- Allegiance: Republic of India
- Branch: Indian Navy
- Rank: Captain
- Service number: 00124-F
- Conflicts: Bangladesh Liberation War
- Awards: Maha Vir Chakra

Captain Mohan Narayan Rao Samant, MVC (1930 – 20 March 2019) was an officer of the Indian Navy who was awarded the Maha Vir Chakra, India's second-highest war-time gallantry award. Samant played an important role in the covert operation called Naval Commando Operation X, which was instituted in 1971 during the Bangladesh Liberation War. Samant had also served as the first commanding officer of the submarine INS Karanj after being appointed to that post in 1969. After the 1971 war ended, he became the first temporary Chief of Naval Staff of the newly created Bangladesh Navy.

== Early life ==
Samant was born in 1930. His domicile was Pune, Maharashtra.

== Career ==
In 1969, Samant was appointed by the Indian Navy as the commissioning Commanding Officer of the submarine INS Karanj.

In 1971, he became an officer attached to the Eastern Naval Command of the Indian Navy. During this tenure, his involvement in covert operations started. In April 1971, before the Indo-Pakistani War of 1971 started, the Naval Commando Operations (X) began training more than 400 Bengali college students and eight submariners as marine-warfare soldiers to carry out covert operations inside the erstwhile East Pakistan. The soldiers trained to swim with limpet mines and use them to destroy Pakistani shipping. Samant was involved in this training process, being the Staff Officer, G1 of the Naval Commando Operations (X).

=== Bangladesh Liberation War of 1971 ===
==== Operation X ====
Operation X was a covert operation run by the Indian Navy during the Bangladesh Liberation War of 1971. It involved attacking the vulnerable maritime shipping associated with East Pakistan to cut off logistics and supplies to Pakistani forces in East Pakistan, thereby easing the advance of the Indian Army. The operation involved the marine-warfare soldiers trained by Samant and his colleagues preceding the war.

Only three naval officers and the Indian Prime Minister had the full knowledge of the operation. Commander Samant (who later became a captain) was one of them and was responsible for the field execution of Operation X. The other two officers were Admiral SM Nanda, then chief of the Indian Navy, and Captain M. K. Roy, then director of India's Naval Intelligence.

Damage or complete destruction was inflicted on about 60,000 tonnes of shipping during Operation Jackpot, which was executed by 176 soldiers under the leadership of Samant.

Overall, the operation resulted in around 100,000 tonnes of logistical and supply shipping being sunk or damaged; the operation emerged as the largest covert maritime operation in history, being bigger than those that were undertaken during the Vietnam War and World War II.

==== Other engagements ====
Captain Samant led an attack involving three gunboats on Pakistani ships on the Pussur River during the period between 7–10 December 1971. Two of the boats were lost to friendly fire from the Indian Air Force. Samant rescued survivors and continued the attack.

=== First Chief of Bangladesh Navy ===
Samant subsequently became the first temporary Chief of Naval Staff of the newly created Bangladesh Navy and was awarded the 'Friend of Liberation war' honour. He remained chief till early 1972, when he was succeeded by Nurul Huq.

== Later life and death ==
Samant retired on 22 July 1974. He died after a cardiac arrest at the age of 89 on 20 March 2019 at 11.53 AM in the Arogya Nidhi Hospital located in the suburbs of Mumbai. He was accorded a military funeral.

== Maha Vir Chakra ==
Samant was awarded the Maha Vir Chakra, India's second-highest gallantry award, in 1971.

The citation for the Maha Vir Chakra reads as follows:

Gazette Notification: 18 Pres/72,12-2-72

CITATION

COMMANDER MOHAN NARAYAN RAO SAMANT (00124-F)

Commander Mohan Narayan Rao Samant was the Senior Officer of a Force consisting of Craft, which carried out the most daring and highly successful attacks on the enemy in Mongla and Khulna Ports. Maneuvering his Squadron through a most hazardous and unfamiliar route, Commander Samant achieved complete surprise and routed the enemy in Mongla inflicting very heavy losses. Commander Samant then proceeded to attack Khulna to destroy the enemy entrenched in strength in the port. A bitter fight ensued in which the force was subjected to incessant air attacks. Two boats belonging to the Mukti Bahini operating with the Force were sunk. In utter disregard for his personal safety, the officer not only managed to pick up a large number of the survivors but persisted with fierce attacks on the enemy with devastating results. Commander Samant had a number of narrow escapes, but refused to withdraw to safer waters. By his personal example and high qualities of leadership, Commander Samant inspired his men to rise to the occasion and fight most gallantly.

Throughout the operations, Commander Mohan Narayan Rao Samant displayed conspicuous gallantry, dedication and leadership.

== Books ==
Samant has co-authored the book Operation X: The Untold Story of India's Covert Naval War in East Pakistan with Sandeep Unnithan.

== See also ==
- Bangladesh Liberation War
- Mukti Bahini

Military offices
Preceded by First Holder	Chief of Naval Staff (Bangladesh); 1971–1972	Succeeded by Nurul Huq
