= Defence Intelligence Agency (India) =

Tri-service military intelligence agency of India

- Flag of parent organisation, Integrated Defence Staff

Military Intelligence agency overview
- Formed: 1 March 2002; 24 years ago
- Jurisdiction: India
- Headquarters: New Delhi, India
- Employees: Classified
- Annual budget: Classified
- Minister responsible: Rajnath Singh, Minister of Defence
- Military Intelligence agency executive: Lieutenant General V. Hariharan, Director General
- Parent department: Integrated Defence Staff

The Defence Intelligence Agency (DIA) is a tri-service military intelligence organisation of the Indian Armed Forces. It was established in 2002 to improve the coordination and integration of defence intelligence among the Indian Army, Indian Navy and Indian Air Force. The agency functions within the Integrated Defence Staff under the Ministry of Defence. The agency is headed by the Director General, Defence Intelligence Agency (DG DIA), a three-star officer of the Indian Army.

Lieutenant General V. Hariharan is currently serving as the Director General, Defence Intelligence Agency.

== History ==
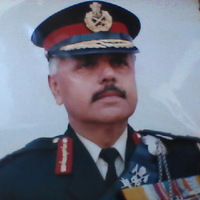
Lieutenant General Kamal Davar, the first Director General of the Defence Intelligence Agency.

The Defence Intelligence Agency emerged from a wider reorganisation of India's national-security and higher-defence structure following the Kargil War of 1999. The Kargil Review Committee identified deficiencies in the collection, coordination, assessment and dissemination of intelligence and examined the need for an integrated defence-intelligence organisation.

The subsequent Group of Ministers review of the national-security system recommended reforms intended to improve coordination among the armed services and India's intelligence organisations. The reforms resulted in the establishment of the Integrated Defence Staff, Defence Intelligence Agency, Strategic Forces Command and Andaman and Nicobar Command, among other institutions.

The Ministry of Defence subsequently described the DIA as one of the tri-service bodies established in pursuance of the Group of Ministers' recommendations.

The Defence Intelligence Agency became operational in March 2002. Lieutenant General Kamal Davar became its first Director General.

== Organisation ==
The DIA forms part of the tri-service Integrated Defence Staff structure. The Integrated Defence Staff was itself created as part of the post-Kargil defence reforms to promote coordination and integration among the three armed services.

The Director General of the Defence Intelligence Agency heads the organisation. The position has traditionally been held by a three-star officer of the Indian Armed Forces.

As of June 2026, Lieutenant General Shrinjay Pratap Singh, AVSM, YSM, was serving as Director General of the Defence Intelligence Agency.

His predecessor, Lieutenant General Dinesh Singh Rana, served as DG DIA before assuming command of the Andaman and Nicobar Command on 1 June 2025. The Ministry of Defence described Rana as the first Chief of Defence Intelligence to subsequently be elevated to the rank of a Commander-in-Chief.

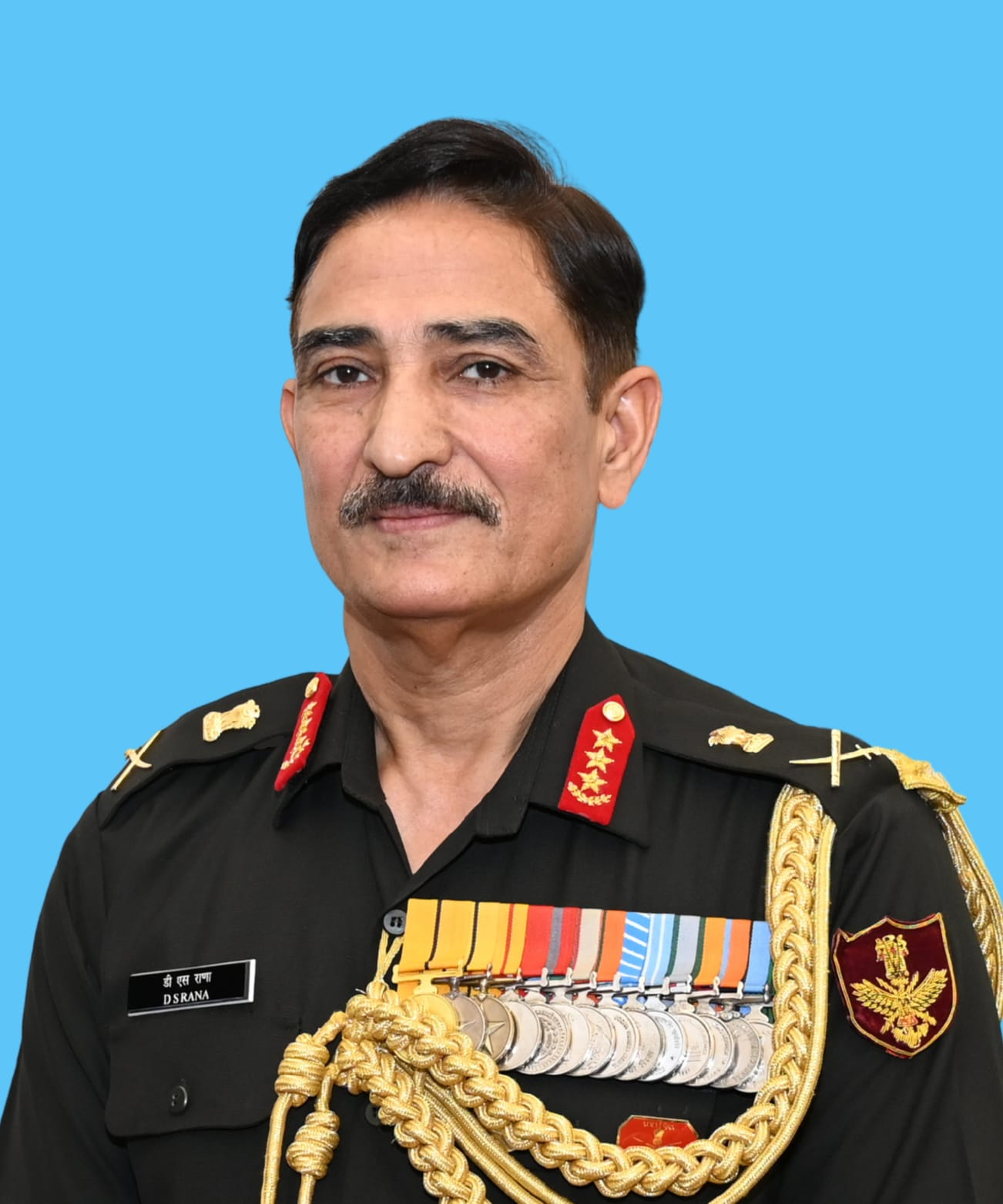
Lieutenant General Dinesh Singh Rana, a former Director General of the Defence Intelligence Agency.

=== Defence intelligence coordination ===
The DIA was established to improve coordination between the intelligence organisations of India's three armed services. Before its creation, military intelligence was largely handled separately by the intelligence directorates of the Army, Navy and Air Force.

The post-Kargil review had emphasised the advantages of an integrated defence-intelligence structure with adequate technological intelligence capabilities and institutional mechanisms for coordination between intelligence agencies and their consumers.

DIA works alongside the service intelligence directorates:

- Directorate of Military Intelligence of the Indian Army
- Directorate of Naval Intelligence of the Indian Navy
- Directorate of Air Intelligence of the Indian Air Force

=== Technical intelligence ===
The Defence Intelligence Agency has been associated with the coordination of specialised technical-intelligence capabilities of the armed forces. These include the Directorate of Signals Intelligence and the Defence Image Processing and Analysis Centre (DIPAC).

DIPAC is associated with the processing and analysis of imagery used for defence intelligence, while signals-intelligence organisations provide information derived from communications and electronic sources.

== Role in joint operations ==
The DIA participates in the wider joint-planning and intelligence-sharing structures of the Indian Armed Forces.

In February 2026, representatives of the Defence Intelligence Agency participated alongside the Integrated Defence Staff, Indian Army, Indian Navy, Indian Air Force and Defence Space Agency in the All Domain Joint Operations Exercise framework. The discussions included integrated planning, intelligence sharing, interoperability and capability prioritisation across military domains.

The participation reflects the agency's role within the broader tri-service architecture established to improve information sharing and joint military planning.

== International defence-intelligence cooperation ==
The Director General of the Defence Intelligence Agency also participates in India's bilateral defence-intelligence and security engagements with foreign governments and armed forces.

In May 2024, then DG DIA Lieutenant General Dinesh Singh Rana led an Indian military delegation to Tanzania. He held discussions with senior Tanzanian military leaders, including the Chief of Defence Staff and Chief of Defence Intelligence, concerning regional security and bilateral defence cooperation.

In December 2024, Rana visited Greece, where he met senior officers of the Hellenic National Defence General Staff. The discussions included the exchange of information and assessments concerning shared security challenges.

In March 2025, the DG DIA visited Australia for discussions with senior Australian defence and intelligence officials. Meetings included representatives of the Australian Department of Defence, the Office of National Intelligence, defence-intelligence leadership and the Australian Defence Force. The visit focused on intelligence-sharing mechanisms, regional-security cooperation and strategic engagement in the Indo-Pacific.

== Relationship with the Integrated Defence Staff ==
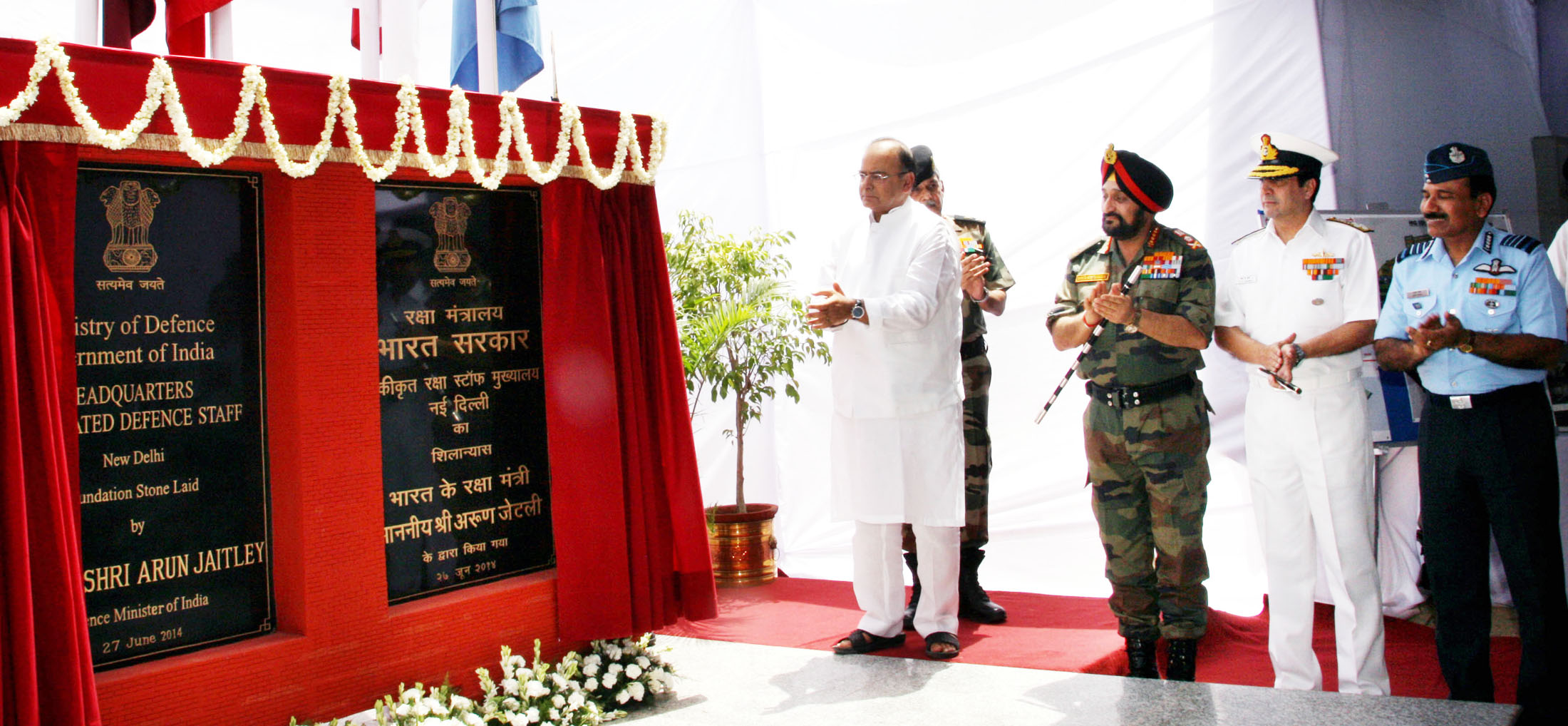
The foundation stone ceremony for the Headquarters Integrated Defence Staff building complex in New Delhi in 2014.

The DIA operates within the wider institutional framework of the Integrated Defence Staff. HQ IDS is responsible for promoting jointness and integration among the Indian Army, Navy and Air Force and providing coordinated military inputs on areas including operations, force development and capability planning.

The defence-intelligence function forms one component of this tri-service architecture.

== Directors General ==
The known Directors General of the Defence Intelligence Agency include:

Director General	Service	Period
Lieutenant General Kamal Davar	Indian Army	2002–2004
Lieutenant General Dinesh Singh Rana	Indian Army	Until 31 May 2025
Lieutenant General Shrinjay Pratap Singh	Indian Army	2025–present

== See also ==
- Integrated Defence Staff
- Indian Intelligence Community
- Directorate of Military Intelligence (India)
- Directorate of Naval Intelligence (India)
- Directorate of Air Intelligence (India)
- Research and Analysis Wing
- Intelligence Bureau (India)
- National Technical Research Organisation
- List of intelligence agencies of India
