= DigiKavach =

Online fraud identification program

- Original author: Google
- Type: cybersecurity
- Website: Google FAQ

DigiKavach is an online fraud identification program, designed to prevent online financial fraud in India.

== Background ==
It was launched by Google in 2023 to protect Indian users from online fraud and to study how scammers operate in India. Based on this information, Google collaborated to create and put into action measures to counter newly-emerging scams.

The program involves collaboration with Fintech Association for Consumer Empowerment (FACE) to protect from unscrupulous fintech and predatory loan-app companies. Earlier under DigiKavach, Google granted $4 million to Cyberpeace Foundation to build awareness about digital literacy and online safety in India. It works with Ministry of Home Affairs.

=== Implementation ===
The Indian Cyber Crime Coordination Centre, Cyber Crime Helpline (1930) and DigiKavach will work together to provide information and support to victims of financial fraud, for a swift response to threats. Building on its anti-fraud program, DigiKavach, Google intends to introduce its Safety Engineering System by 2025.
