= Abhay (police officer) =

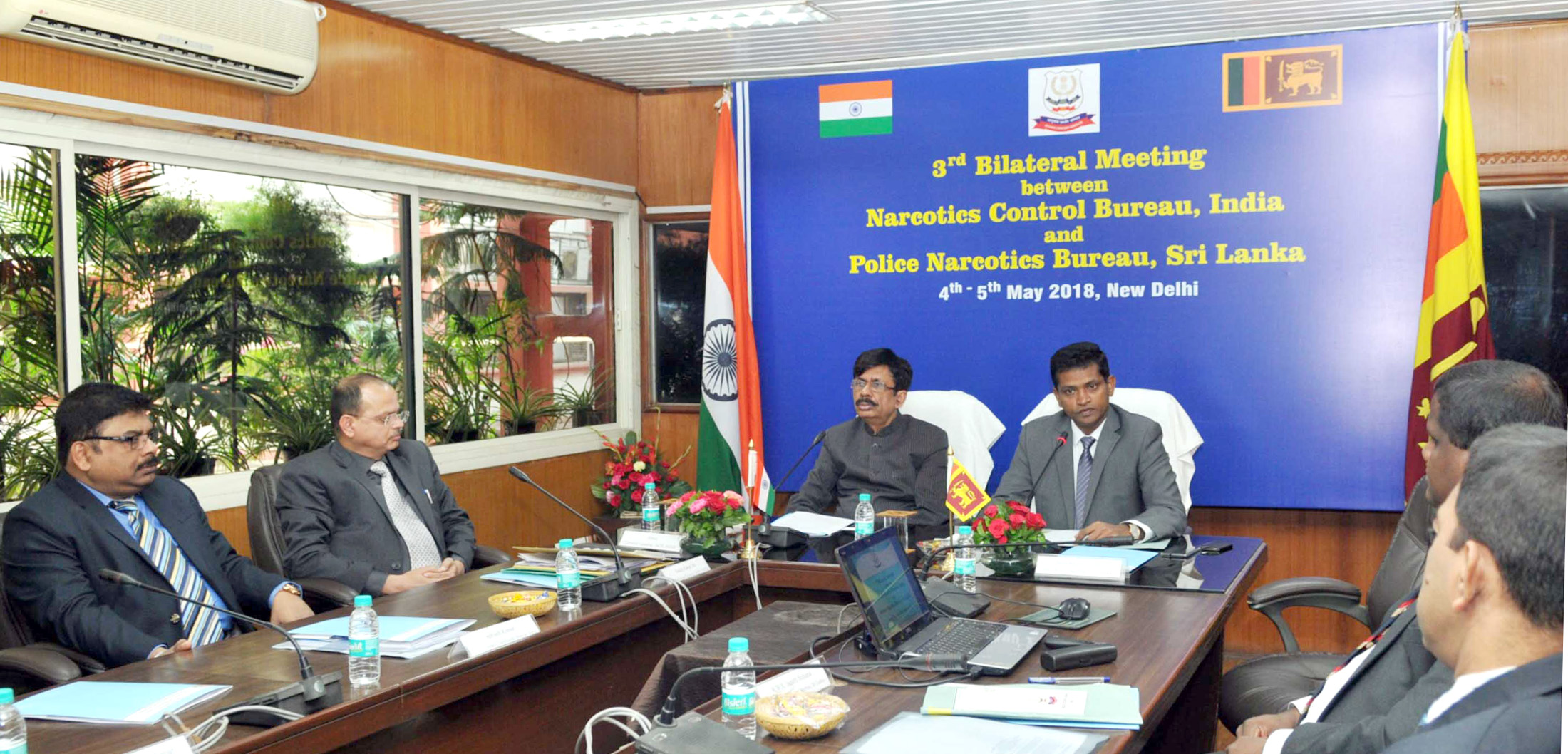
- Abhay during a bilateral interaction with Sri Lankan officers during his stint as the head of India's Narcotics Control Bureau
- Born: India
- Occupation: Police Service officer
- Known for: former head of the Narcotics Control Bureau(NCB)

Abhay is a former head of the Narcotics Control Bureau(NCB), India's premier drug law enforcement agency.. He was also the police chief of the Indian State of Odisha, and Director of the Sardar Vallabhbhai Patel National Police Academy(NPA).

An Indian Police Service (IPS) officer, he joined the service in 1986 and served in the Central Bureau of Investigation(CBI), the Bureau of Police Research and Development(BPR&D), Central Reserve Police Force(CRPF) in senior positions, before heading the Narcotics Control Bureau, Sardar Vallabhbhai Patel National Police Academy and the Odisha Police.
