= S. C. Malhan =

Indian air force commander

Air Marshal S. C. Malhan is an Indian Air Force commander who served as the first Deputy Director General of the Defence Intelligence Agency.
