= Operation X =

Operation X may refer to:

- A KGB operation during the martial law in Poland
- Operation X (1962 film), Japan
- Operation X (1950 film), Columbia Pictures
- Operation X: The Untold Story of India's Covert Naval War in East Pakistan, a book
- Operation X (Spanish Civil War), a secret Soviet weapons shipment to the Republicans during the Spanish Civil War
