= All India Radio Monitoring Service =

Intelligence agency in India

All India Radio Monitoring Service (AIRMS) is the central monitoring service that monitors broadcasts in India as well as from all foreign broadcasts of interest to India. AIRMS is located in Shimla, Himachal Pradesh, India. It works in liaison with the Research and Analysis Wing (R&AW) and the Directorate of Military Intelligence.
