= Technical Support Division =

- Active: 2010–2012
- Country: India
- Branch: Indian Army
- Type: Military Intelligence
- Role: Covert Operations and Intelligence Gathering
- Size: 4-6 Officers 2-5 JCOs 30-32 Soldiers
- Headquarters: Delhi Cantonment

Commanders
- Chief of Army Staff: General V.K. Singh
- Unit Commander: Colonel “Hunny” Bakshi

Technical Support Division (TSD) was a hypothetical ad hoc Indian Army Military Intelligence unit formed in 2010 under the then Chief of Army Staff General V K Singh. After the functioning of the TSD was questioned for falling prey to politics, including politics between the three military chiefs, among other things, it was disbanded in 2012 following the retirement of General V K Singh after all officers assigned to the division were transferred out and nobody new replaced them.

== Creation ==
The need and trigger for the formation of a new military intelligence unit was felt following 2008 Mumbai terrorist attacks. After this, National Security Adviser, M.K Narayanan, tried to find out if Indian intelligence and security agencies had the capability to attack terror groups in Pakistan. After finding out that no agency had this capability, he asked them to raise a team. However it was only in March 2010, when Lt Gen R.K. Loomba, chief of Military Intelligence, approached General V.K. Singh with the proposal. General V.K. Singh gave the go ahead, and accordingly Lt Gen R.K. Loomba put Colonel Hunny Bakshi to be in charge of the new unit and train them.

=== Mandate ===
The TSD's primary internal focus was to be in the North and North-East regions of India, as well as "inside depth areas of countries of interest." It was allegedly tasked with planning and executing special operations both domestically and internationally that "counter enemy efforts within the country by effective covert means". Internal army approvals were granted as this would allow the Military Intelligence Directorate to quickly respond to state-sponsored terrorism with a "high degree of deniability." The TSD was also asked to cover any tracks leading to it.

Another focus of the TSD was the targeting of high-level terrorists deep in enemy territory as well as conducting psychological warfare.

The TSD had no official jurisdiction or mandate, which led to conflicts with other intelligence and counter-terrorism agencies. Formation commanders found TSD conducting operations in border areas without their knowledge and at least one general complained about the TSD's activities in Kashmir to General V.K Singh, the then Chief of Army Staff. There were also questions about its legality as intelligence gathering and covert operations beyond Indian borders falls to civilian agencies such as the Research and Analysis Wing.

=== Structure and logistics ===
TSD fulfilled no government requirements and was an ad hoc unit with no official sanction or war establishment authorization. This meant no soldier could be attached to the unit, and hence were attached to military intelligence unit 25. However, they did not report to the Brigadier in-charge of MI-25 and reported directly to the Chief of Army Staff. The unit began with either four officers and thirty two men or six officers, five JCOs and 30 men, according to different accounts. The TSD was approved in writing through an operational directive by then Defense Minister, A.K Antony.

These men were picked by Colonel Hunny Bakshi. The officers selected included:

- Lt Col Birdie, a former R&AW operative who received a gallantry award.
- Lt Col Sarvesh, a Kargil veteran and skydiver with over 3000 jumps.
- Lt Col Alfred, a negotiator who helped form a truce between the ULFA and the Indian army.
- Lt Col Zir, an intelligence operative known for having a large network and bringing about a ceasefire with the DHD.
- Lt Col Naughty, an expert in cultivating assets who was credited for identifying the people behind stone pelting incidents in Kashmir.
- An unnamed officer who was senior to Bakshi and was close to retirement.

TSD allegedly operated out of a two-storied building in the Delhi cantonment, nicknamed the Butchery, as it was a slaughterhouse in the colonial era.

=== Budget ===
TSD received secret service funds that were drawn from accounts in the State Bank of India. According to then director general of military operations, Lt Gen Vinod Bhatia, the TSD was allocated a total of 20 crores for specific operations. These funds were reallocated from an annual 50 crore secret service fund belonging to field intelligence units operating near Indian borders.

== Operations ==
Due to the covert nature of the unit, not much is publicly known about their operations. Media leaks and reports by various agencies have led to some details being uncovered. Initial reports related to the team were positive, and missions were successful.

=== Intelligence gathering ===
TSD specialized in creating deep assets and surveillance. By the time they disbanded, the unit had created a large number of assets and contacts in Azad Jammu and Kashmir. TSD allegedly tracked Syed Salahuddin, the Hizb-ul-Mujahideen chief, receiving praise for the same. A board of officers report also mentioned operations by the TSD in the Northeast.

=== Covert operations ===
TSD has allegedly conducted over 8 covert operations abroad. Details regarding these operations are sparse, but they include:

- Operation inside an Inter-Services Intelligence office in Faisalabad, Pakistan
- Turning a secessionist chief in a province of a neighboring country
- Carrying out "eight low-intensity bomb blasts in a neighboring country"

When active, the TSD was also credited with stopping the flow of illegal arms to Naxals in Chhattisgarh and Andhra Pradesh from insurgents in the North-East and Myanmar. It has also been claimed that TSD was responsible for capturing two highly ranked terror group leaders and extracting them to India.

== Alleged abuses of power ==
According to defense journalist Ajit Kumar Dubey, the fight between General V.K Singh and the defense ministry over his age was viewed by General Bikram Singh and General Dalbir Singh Suhag as an attempt to scuttle their chances of succeeding him. This led to increased criticism of General V.K Singh's initiatives, the largest being TSD. This led to many allegations being leaked to the media. When General Bikram Singh became the COAS, a probe was ordered and the unit was disbanded. A CBI probe was also demanded, however this was overruled by A.K Antony, concerned about foreign reactions that may arise from further coverage of TSD's actions. Many DGMI officers still believe that TSD was simply caught in the middle of a political fight.

=== Misuse of funds ===
After General V.K Singh retired, director general of military operations, Lt Gen Vinod Bhatia conducted an inquiry into TSD. The inquiry found that 8 crore of the 20 crore used by the TSD were unaccounted for, however, the inquiry gave Colonel Bakshi the benefit of the doubt as the operations were covert and required an element of deniability. Media reports also alleged that there was frequent travel by TSD officials to Dubai and London using their personal passports, insinuating corruption, however nothing came of this.

=== Surveillance in Delhi ===
In 2012, media reports alleged that TSD had spent 8 crores on off-air interception equipment that could be used to intercept mobile phone conversations. The Indian Express further claimed that this equipment had been deployed in the North Block to tap the phones of Defense Minister A.K. Antony and senior officials from the ministry. However, it was pointed out that A.K Antony uses an encrypted RAX line and not a regular service provider, making an off-air interception device useless. This allegation was never mentioned by the army or any internal inquiry and wasn't even used during the court martial of a TSD officer. General V.K Singh denied the allegations and called it 'gimmickry' for the upcoming elections.

=== Attempts to influence domestic J&K politics ===
Further media reports soon emerged accusing General V.K Singh and the TSD of bribing Kashmiri politicians to destabilize the Omar Abdullah government. The media alleged that this was done by paying Rs 1.19 crore to Ghulam Hassan Mir, then J&K Agriculture Minister with the aim of toppling the J&K government. Critics questioned how a single independent MP could achieve this.

=== Sabotaging Bikram Singh's appointment ===
It was further claimed that TSD paid Rs 2.38 crore given to Hakikat Singh, a man who set up an NGO called "Kashmir Humanitarian Service Organisation". This was linked to a previously unheard of NGO known as Yes Kashmir. This NGO was responsible for a public interest litigation against General Bikram Singh that alleged that the general received a gallantry medal for a fake encounter in 2001. The Army and General claimed that a Pakistani militant was killed in the encounter, whereas the family of the victim claimed he was a laborer. The Supreme Court dismissed the PIL and cleared the path for General Bikram Singh's promotion. Many viewed the PIL to be an attempt by the TSD and General V.K Singh to stop General Bikram Singh from becoming the COAS.

== Aftermath ==
=== Officers ===
After the first inquiry, several more were held, however no unlawful activities have been found. Unable to bring charges right after the disbandment, TSD officers were given punishment postings. Colonel Bakshi was posted to Ladakh as a quartermaster. Unable to cope with the hostility and harassment he faced from seniors, Bakshi admitted himself into the psychiatric ward of the Army Base Hospital in Delhi. His wife further wrote to the defense ministry and the prime minister, stating that he had suicidal tendencies.

In September 2015, the GOC Delhi Area recommended a court martial against three officers of the TSD. The trial started in August 2017 and ended in March 2018 when the GCM dropped all proceedings against Colonel Bakshi.

=== Intelligence Agencies ===
The Deputy Chief of Army Staff, Lt General D.S. Thakur, when appearing as a witness in the case noted the following:

“It is sad to see that the witch hunt against the Intelligence Corps Officers who put their careers and lives on the line and took grave risks in conducting these operations in the service of the nation, still continues. It is also sad that, we don’t realise what damage we have been doing to the overall morale and effectiveness of our Intelligence Corps. By pursuing such inquiries we are only sending message to our Intelligence Corps personnel not to take risks and play safe. It is our officers at the apex level who should squarely take the blame for this state of affairs as without vibrant Intelligence Corps operations, we will be blinded in the Army.”

Regulations were also strengthened, the DGMI now needs to submit a quarterly statement of expenditure from secret service funds to the Defense Ministry. A new mandate has also been created, emphasizing that the DGMI can only engage in operations taking place on the Indian border.
