= Kamal Davar =

Indian general

Retired lieutenant general Kamal Davar
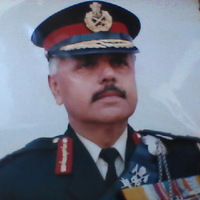
- Allegiance: India
- Rank: Lieutenant general
- Conflicts: Indo-Pakistani War of 1965 Western Sector 1971; Op Vijay 1999 and Ladakh ops

Lieutenant General Kamal Davar is a retired Indian military officer and security expert who served as the first Director General of the Defense Intelligence Agency and deputy chief of the Integrated Defense Staff.

== Early life and education ==
Davar is the son of veteran freedom fighter and Indian National Congress leader, Dr. M.C. Davar, a pacifist who fought to prevent the partition of India. Kamal Davar was an alumnus of the National Defence Academy, Khadakvasala, and also holds an MSc in defense studies from Madras University and a doctorate in security studies from Chaudhary Charan Singh University, Meerut.

== Military career ==
Davar was commissioned into the 7th Light Cavalry Regiment of the Indian Army. As a young officer, Davar participated in the 1965 India-Pakistan War, during which he was wounded in action in the Lahore sector. Subsequently, he also participated in active operations during the 1971 Bangladesh Liberation War. He eventually rose to command the 86th Armoured Regiment of the Indian Army and also to serve on the Indian Military Training Team in Iraq. As a brigadier, he commanded the spearhead armored brigade of the Army and subsequently was an instructor at the College of Combat (now the Army War College). As a major general, Davar was sent as the first armored corps officer to command three divisions responsible for the entire Ladakh sector. After two eventful years, he was posted as chief of staff at the corps headquarters in Nagrota, Jammu and Kashmir, during the height of counter-insurgency operations. He subsequently rose to become general officer commanding an army corps in Punjab, in the rank of lieutenant general. After completion of command as GOC of a corps, he was appointed director-general, Mechanized Forces, at Army Headquarters in 2001. On March 5, 2002, the government announced Davar's appointment as the first chief of the Defense Intelligence Agency (DIA) and Deputy Chief of the Integrated Defense Staff. As the first chief of the DIA, he is reputed to have taken many pioneering intelligence initiatives both at home and abroad. General Davar has also served as the Colonel of the Regiment of the 86 Armored Regiment, as well as that of the 74th Armoured Regiment.

== Environmentalism ==
Kamal Davar promoted the successful campaign to plant lakhs of trees in Punjab and clean the Harike Bird Sanctuary in Punjab. Following his retirement, he continued to promote environmental issues, encouraging local army units and schools to regularly plant trees. He is also an active and leading member of SPOKE (the Society for the Preservation of Kasauli and its Environs) and was nominated as its president.

== Post retirement activities ==
Post-retirement, Davar has written regularly for the national media and military journals on security, counter-terrorism, and intelligence issues. He has also spoken at various institutions, both in India and abroad, on security-related and geo-political subjects. Currently, he is also the coordinator of the Strategic Studies Cell, a think tank based in Kasauli, Himachal Pradesh, India. Gen. Davar is also a member of the international High Level Military Group (HLMG), which monitors Israeli military operations in the Gaza Strip, West Bank, and along the Israel-Lebanon border. Davar has been involved with Track II dialogues between India and Pakistan. Davar was recently nominated as the president of a new think tank established in the capital called the Delhi Forum for Strategic Studies (DFFSS). Davar has published books on the Pakistani state and Indian history.
