= Economic Intelligence Council =

- Indian Intelligence Community

- Emblem of the Ministry of Finance

Agency overview
- Jurisdiction: Government of India
- Headquarters: New Delhi
- Employees: Classified
- Annual budget: Classified
- Minister responsible: Nirmala Sitharaman, Finance Minister
- Parent agency: Central Economic Intelligence Bureau (CEIB)
- Website: ceib.gov.in/economic-intelligence-council-eic

The Economic Intelligence Council is the apex forum overseeing government agencies responsible for economic intelligence and combating economic offences in India. The council is also the apex of 18 regional economic intelligence committees, and is part of the Union Ministry of Finance. It was formed in 1990.

== Functions ==
The Economic Intelligence Council is responsible for coordination, strategy and information-sharing amongst the government agencies responsible for intelligence and control of economic offences such as smuggling, money laundering tax evasion and fraud. The council also advises the Finance Minister and the Union Council of Ministers on laws regulating the financial sector and fighting economic crimes.

== Members ==
Union Finance Minister Smt. Nirmala Sitharaman chaired the Economic Intelligence Council meeting, organised by Central Economic Intelligence Bureau in New Delhi in October 2023

- Chairperson:
  - Finance Minister of India
- Chief Members:
  - Governor of the Reserve Bank of India (RBI)
  - Chairman of the Securities and Exchange Board of India (SEBI)
  - Director of the Central Bureau of Investigation (CBI)
  - Director of the Narcotics Control Bureau (NCB)
  - Director of the Financial Intelligence Unit—India (FIU-IND)
  - Director of the Directorate of Revenue Intelligence (DRI)
- Finance Ministry Members:
  - Finance Secretary
  - Revenue Secretary
  - Company Affairs Secretary
  - Additional Secretary of Banking
- Central Board of Indirect Taxes and Customs (CBIC):
  - Chairman of CBIC
  - Members responsible for Excise/GST, Customs and Anti-Smuggling departments (including Directors of DGGI and DRI)
- Central Board of Direct Taxes (CBDT):
  - Chairman of CBDT
  - Member for Investigation
- Other Department Heads:
  - Director of the Directorate General of Economic Enforcement
- Council Secretariat:
  - Deputy Director General of the Central Economic Intelligence Bureau (Secretary)
- Special Invitees:
  - Director of the Intelligence Bureau (DIB)
  - Director General of Foreign Trade (Directorate General of Foreign Trade)

== Regional committees ==
Under the Economic Intelligence Council are 30 Regional Economic Intelligence Committee (India). The committees are constituted of a wide range of agencies and officials responsible for the designated regions.
