= Regional Economic Intelligence Committee =

Jurisdictional structure
- Federal agency: India
- Operations jurisdiction: India
- Governing body: Government of India
- General nature: Federal law enforcement

Operational structure
- Headquarters: New Delhi, India
- Parent agency: Ministry of Finance, Department of Revenue

The Regional Economic Intelligence Committee is the apex forum overseeing government agencies responsible for economic intelligence and combating economic offenses in the respective states of India. The committee is under the Economic Intelligence Council. It was formed in 1990. The head of the committee is usually the Director General of the Directorate General of Income Tax Investigation.

== Members ==
- Director General of Income Tax (chairman)
- Reserve Bank of India Regional Director
- Securities and Exchange Board of India Regional Director
- Director general of police
- Chief Commissioner of Income Tax
- Commissioner of Income Tax-1
- Director of Income Tax Intelligence
- Director of Income Tax Investigation
- Director of Income Tax Criminal Investigation
- Inspector General of Police (Economic Offenses)
- Superintendent or DIG or Joint Director of CBI
- Superintendent or DIG or Joint Director of National Investigation Agency
- DIG Central Reserve Police Force
- DIG Central Industrial Security Force
- Zonal Director Narcotics Control Bureau
- Representation from Lokayukta
- Joint Director General of Foreign Trade
- Chief Commissioner of Customs & Central Excise/Goods & Service Tax
- Commissioner of Customs and Central Excise/Goods & Service Tax
- Additional Director General of GST Intelligence (DGGI)
- Registrar of Companies (RoC)
- Commissioner of Commercial Tax
- Additional Director General of Revenue Intelligence (DRI)
- Additional Commissioners of Income Tax (Nodal Secretary)

Members vary from state to state.

== Heads/Chairmen in various states ==
- Director General of Income Tax (Investigation), Ahmedabad - Region of Ahmedabad in the state of Gujarat.
- Director General of Income Tax (Investigation), Bangalore - Region of Karnataka and Goa in the state of Karnataka.
- Chief Commissioner of Customs and Central Excise/Goods & Service Tax, Vadodara - Region of Vadodara, Surat and Rajkot in the state of Gujarat.
- Chief Commissioner of Customs and Central Excise/Goods & Service Tax, Bhopal - Region of Bhopal, Indore, Raipur and Jabalpur in the states of Madhya Pradesh and Chhattisgarh.
- Commissioner of Income Tax Bhubaneswar - region of Bhubaneswar in the state of Odisha.
- Director General of Income Tax, Mumbai - region of Mumbai in the state of Maharashtra and the state of Goa.
- Director General of Income Tax (Investigation), Kolkata - region of Kolkata in the state of West Bengal.
- Director General of Income Tax (Investigation), Chandigarh - region of Chandigarh, Rohtak, Amritsar, Jalandhar and Patiala in the state of Punjab.
- Chief Commissioner of Income Tax, Kochi - region of Kochi, Thiruvananthapuram and Calicut in the state of Kerala.
- Director General of Income Tax (Investigation), Delhi - region of Delhi.
- Chief Commissioner of Income Tax, Hyderabad - region of Hyderabad, Visakhapatnam and Guntur in the state of Andhra Pradesh.
- Chief Commissioner of Income Tax, Jaipur - region of Jaipur in the state of Rajasthan.
- Chief Commissioner of Income Tax, Kanpur - region of Kanpur, Allahabad, Lucknow, Agra and Meerut in the state of Uttar Pradesh.
- Director General of Income Tax (Investigation), Chennai - region of Chennai in the state of Tamil Nadu
- Commissioner of Customs, Madurai - region of Madurai and Coimbatore in the state of Tamil Nadu.
- Chief Commissioner of Income Tax, Patna - region of Patna and Ranchi in the states of Bihar and Jharkhand respectively.
- Chief Commissioner of Income Tax, Pune - region of Pune, Aurangabad, Belgaum, Kolhapur, Nasik and Nagpur in the state of Maharashtra.
- Commissioner of Customs (Preventive), Shillong - region of Shillong in the state of Meghalaya.
