= R. S. Raman =

Retired Lieutenant general of the Indian Army

Lieutenant General R. S. Raman PVSM AVSM YSM
- Military career
- Allegiance: India
- Branch: Indian Army
- Rank: Lieutenant General
- Unit: Infantry of the Indian Army
- Commands: 114th Infantry Brigade; 3rd Infantry Division

Raghavachari Santhana Raman is a retired three-star general of the Indian Army who last served as the Director General of Military Intelligence.

== Military career ==
Raman was commissioned in the Infantry of the Indian Army.

He has commanded 114 Infantry Brigade at Leh and 3 Infantry Division at Ladakh. He frequently participated in delegations engaging with the People's Liberation Army (PLA), including interactions during the Chinese Spring Festival and the first HADR exercise between the Chushul and Moldo Garrisons. He met several senior PLA officers in different times. At present, he is leading the Directorate of Military Intelligence.

During his career, he has been awarded the Param Vishisht Seva Medal, Ati Vishisht Seva Medal and the Yudh Seva Medal.
