= Operation X (book) =

2019 non-fiction book

Operation X: The Untold Story of India's Covert Naval War in East Pakistan
- Book cover
- Authors: Captain M.N.R. Samant, Sandeep Unnithan
- Set in: Bangladesh Liberation War, 1971
- Publisher: HarperCollins Publishers India
- Pages: 256
- ISBN: 9789353570200

Operation X: The Untold Story of India's Covert Naval War in East Pakistan is a book co-authored by Captain M.N.R. Samant and Sandeep Unnithan. It is the first known documentation of Indian Navy's Directorate of Naval Intelligence's Operation X, which was undertaken in 1971 during the Bangladesh Liberation War.

== Authors ==
The book is co-authored by Sandeep Unnithan and M.N.R. Samant.

=== Sandeep Unnithan ===
Sandeep Unnithan is a writer and journalist who is an Executive Editor at India Today.

=== M.N.R. Samant ===
Indian Navy Captain Mohan Narayan Rao Samant (1930-2019) was the Staff Officer, G1 of the Naval Commando Operations-X unit. He was decorated with India's second highest gallantry award, the Maha Vir Chakra. He died on 20 March 2019.

== Launch ==
The book was launched in August 2019 in the presence of both former and incumbent Indian Navy Chiefs, including Admiral Sunil Lanba and Admiral Arun Prakash. Former Indian envoy to Pakistan Gopalaswami Parthasarathy and Commodore A. W. Chowdhury, who led a mutiny against Pakistan, were also present.

== Description ==
The book represents the first known documentation of Operation-X, which occurred during the 1971 Bangladesh Liberation War. Operation-X was a three-stage naval special operation of the Indian Navy which entailed blocking supplies to damage the war waging potential of Pakistan in the erstwhile East Pakistan. Captain Mihir K. Roy and Commander M.N.R Samant led the operation.

== Reception ==
The Hindu describes the book to be "catchy and well-laid-out" and considers it to be a valuable documentation of a "world-class" covert operation. The Tribune describes it as a brilliantly detailed thriller-like book. The Financial Express describes the book as a rare account utilising classified information. The Free Press Journal considers the style of the book to be a “combination of the meticulous detailing by Samant and storytelling of Unnithan”.
