= Directorate of Military Intelligence (India) =

Intelligence arm of the Indian Army

Directorate of Military Intelligence Corps
- Active: 1941 – present
- Country: India
- Branch: Indian Army
- Type: Military intelligence
- Size: 3,700
- Headquarters: Sena Bhawan, New Delhi
- Motto: Always be Alert

Commanders
- Director General Military Intelligence: Lt Gen. R. S. Raman
- Colonel of the Regiment: Lt Gen R. S. Raman

Insignia
- Formation sign

The Directorate of Military Intelligence (M.I.) is the Intelligence arm of the Indian Army. The primary mission of military intelligence is to provide timely, relevant, accurate, and synchronized intelligence support to tactical, operational and strategic-level needs of the army.

It also conducts counter-intelligence activities to detect, identify and neutralize adversarial intelligence threats inside the Indian Army.

== Organisation ==
Approximately 3,700 military personnel are assigned to intelligence duties. These personnel are trained at the Military Intelligence Training School and Depot (MINTSD), Pune.

The operational geographical mandate of the organization is set to 50 km from the border.

== History ==
The agency was set up in 1941 as part of the erstwhile British Indian Army to generate field intelligence for the army, in the Second World War. After India's independence, the Directorate of Military Intelligence (M.I.) was initially tasked with generating only tactical or field intelligence in all countries bordering India.

In 1978, the directorate was involved in the Samba spy scandal, wherein it was later found that the directorate had falsely implicated three Indian Army officers as Pakistani spies.

== Operations ==
In early 1957, 2 M.I. officers had infiltrated into Chinese territory and carried out a reconnaissance operation. It was due to this operation, that Indian government got first-hand evidence that China had illegally built a road in Aksai Chin. The personnel had joined a group of yak grazers in disguise and gathered the first-hand evidence.

In late 1990s, M.I. officers were also deployed in Tajikistan and later into Afghanistan, in support of the Ahmad Shah Massoud–led Northern Alliance that overthrew the Taliban in 2001 with the aid of the US-led coalition forces in the aftermath of the September 11 attacks and the subsequent War in Afghanistan.

M.I. was also active in Myanmar, which nurtured insurgent groups. In 1998, a M.I. operative impersonated a Khalistani terrorist and infiltrated a gun-running Myanmar insurgent group. He led them into a death trap in the Andaman Islands. Operation Leech, as the operation was called, marked the start of the outreach of the Indian Army to the Burmese junta in the 1990s. It also aimed to offset the expanding footprint of China on the eastern border of India.

M.I. has carried out operations in Bangladesh too because of safe sanctuaries provided to insurgent groups like the United Liberation Front of Assam (U.L.F.A.), the United National Liberation Front of Manipur (U.N.L.F.) and the Kamtapur Liberation Organisation. Within months of the Hasina government taking over in 2009, the entire leadership of the U.L.F.A. and the U.N.L.F. was handed over to Indian authorities.

In January 2012, the M.I. warned Sheikh Hasina, the Prime Minister of Bangladesh, about a coup brewing in the Bangladeshi Army which was ultimately foiled.

Since 2005, M.I. is also involved in hundreds of cross-border counter terrorism strikes across LOC, into Pakistan. Most notable being 2016 Surgical strike.

== Military Intelligence Training School & Depot ==
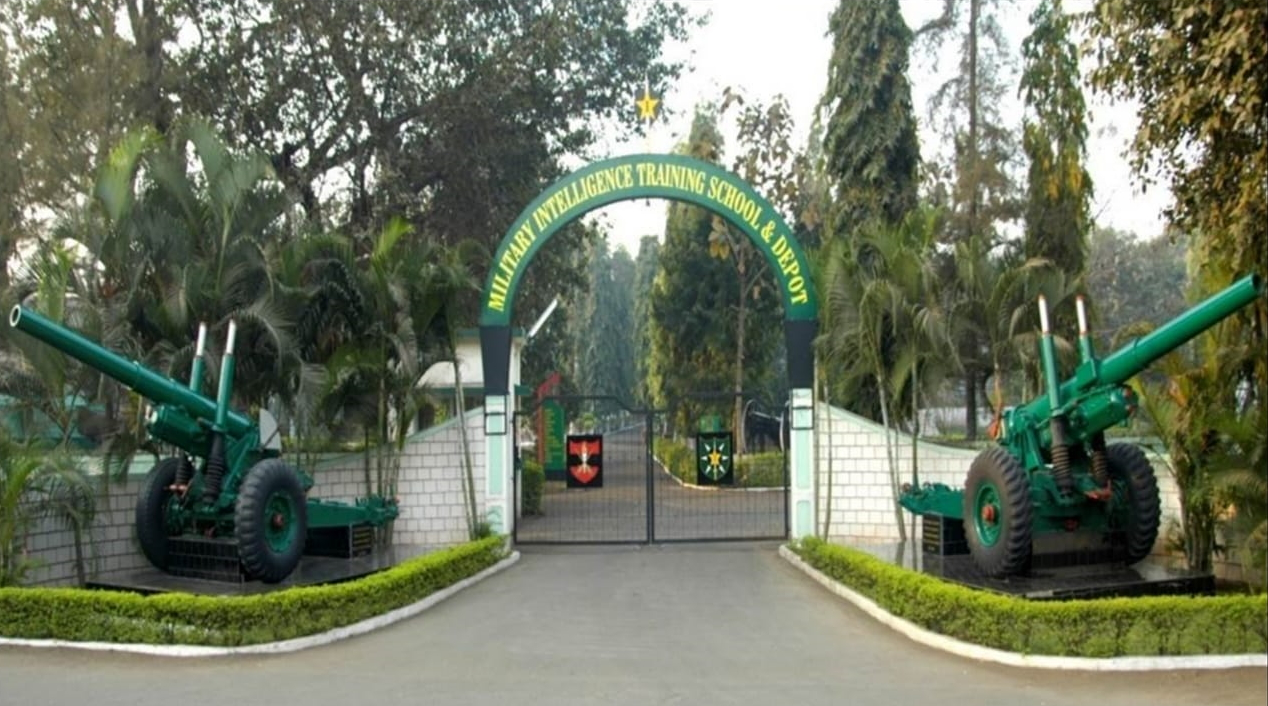
Military Intelligence Training School & Depot, Pune

Military Intelligence Training School & Depot (MINTSD) at Pune trains intelligence professionals of Indian Army, Navy, Air Force, Paramilitary forces, civil intelligence agencies and friendly foreign countries. It started modestly in Karachi on 20 January 1941. MINTSD moved through Murree in July 1947 and, after the partition of India, to Mhow in November 1947 and finally to its present location in Pune in September 1952.

It offers the following courses under the Savitribai Phule Pune University - Diplomas in Combat Intelligence and Security, Management of Intelligence and Security Teams, Management of Intelligence and Security Teams, Security, Security and Intelligence Tradecraft; P.G. Diploma in Combat Intelligence Analysis and Management, Intelligence Tradecraft and Practice, Satellite and Aerial Imagery Interpretation and Security with Specialization in Counter Intelligence.

== Directors General of Military Intelligence ==
Name	Image	Assumed office	Left office	References
Director of Military Operations & Intelligence
Brigadier Pran Nath Thapar		15 August 1947	November 1947	
Brigadier Jayanto Nath Chaudhuri		November 1947	May 1948	
Director of Military Intelligence
Brigadier Chand Narayan Das		May 1948		
Director General of Military Intelligence
Lieutenant general Sundararajan Padmanabhan				
Lieutenant general R. K. Sawhnew				
Lieutenant General RK Loomba		31 August 2009	31 October 2010	
Lieutenant General DS Thakur		31 October 2010	5 December 2012	
Lieutenant General RN Singh		5 December 2012	30 June 2014	
Lieutenant general KG Krishna		30 June 2014	31 July 2016	
Lieutenant general Shravan Kumar Patyal		31 July 2016	1 April 2017	
Lieutenant General Arvind Dutta		1 April 2017	5 November 2018	
Lieutenant general Harinder Singh		5 November 2018	11 October 2019	
Lieutenant General SK Sharma			30 June 2021	
Lieutenant General MV Suchindra Kumar			1 June 2022	
Lieutenant general Tarun Kumar Aich		1 June 2022	10 June 2023	
Lieutenant General R. S. Raman		10 June 2023		

== See also ==
- Defence Intelligence Agency
- Directorate of Air Intelligence
- Directorate of Naval Intelligence
- Technical Support Division
