= National Institute of Cryptology Research and Development =

Indian national-level research centre

- Emblem of India

Agency overview
- Formed: 2007
- Headquarters: Hyderabad, Telangana, India
- Parent department: National Technical Research Organisation

National Institute of Cryptology Research and Development (NICRD) is an Indian national-level research centre for cryptologic education and research.

== History ==
The institute was established in 2007 in Hyderabad. It is one of the institutes which comes under the purview of the National Technical Research Organisation. The other one is the National Critical Information Infrastructure Protection Centre.

It was envisioned to house simulation laboratories, and digital fortress laboratories for financial security and design. It is also designed to develop encryption products for national security-related critical applications.
