= Anurag Garg =

Indian Police Service officer

Personal details
- Born: 13 July 1967 (age 59)
- Education: Indian Institute of Technology (IIT) Delhi, National Defence College, Delhi

Anurag Garg (born 13 July 1967) is an Indian Police Service officer. He is serving as Director General of the Narcotics Control Bureau (NCB) from September 2024 onwards. He was earlier working as Additional Director General at the Border Security Force (BSF) headquarters in New Delhi.

== Life and career ==
Garg worked as an ASP in Shimla and ADC for the governor. He was also included in the important Kosovo mission of the United Nations.
