= Financial Intelligence Unit—India =

Government agency in India

- वित्तीय आसूचना एकक — भारत

Agency overview
- Formed: November 18, 2004; 21 years ago
- Type: Financial Intelligence Unit
- Jurisdiction: Government of India
- Status: Active
- Headquarters: Connaught Place, New Delhi
- Employees: 75
- Minister responsible: Nirmala Sitharaman, Minister of Finance
- Agency executive: Satya Pal Kumar IRS, Director
- Parent department: Department of Revenue
- Website: fiuindia.gov.in

Financial Intelligence Unit—India (FIU-IND) is an organisation under the Department of Revenue, Government of India which collects financial intelligence about offences under the Prevention of Money Laundering Act, 2002. It was set up in November 2004 and reports directly to the Economic Intelligence Council (EIC) headed by the Finance Minister.

== Functions ==
The functions of FIU-IND are:

1. Collection of Information: FIU-IND is the nodal agency for receiving the following reports from various reporting entities.
  1. Cash Transaction reports (CTRs)
  2. Non-Profit Organisation Transaction Reports (NTRs)
  3. Cross Border Wire Transfer Reports (CBWTRs)
  4. Reports on Purchase or Sale of Immovable Property (IPRs)
  5. Suspicious Transaction Reports (STRs)
2. Analysis of Information: to uncover patterns of transactions suggesting suspicion of money laundering and related crimes.
3. Sharing of Information: with national intelligence/law enforcement agencies, national regulatory authorities and foreign Financial Intelligence Units.
4. Act as Central Repository: to maintain the national data base on the basis of reports received from reporting entities.
5. Coordination: Coordinate and strengthen collection and sharing of financial intelligence through an effective national, regional and global network to combat money laundering and related crimes.
6. Research and Analysis: Monitor and identify strategic key areas on money laundering trends, typologies and developments.
7. Punitive Action: The agency can also take punitive action for violations of the PMLA. In December 2020, it imposed a fine of Rs. 9.6 million on PayPal.

== Organisation ==
The agency has a sanctioned strength of 75 staff, drawn on deputation from Central Board of Direct Taxes (CBDT), Central Board of Indirect Taxes and Customs (CBIC), Reserve Bank of India (RBI), Securities and Exchange Board of India (SEBI), Department of Legal Affairs and Intelligence agencies. It is headed by a Director, in the rank of Joint Secretary. Current Director is Pankaj Kumar Mishra, IRS-IT (1989), appointed in May 2016 for a five year term. He was promoted to Additional Secretary in May 2020, as a personal measure, with temporary upgradation of the post.

== See also ==
- List of financial supervisory authorities by country
