= Narcotics Control Bureau =

Indian federal law enforcement agency for combating drug trafficking and consumption

Narcotics Control Bureau स्वापक नियंत्रण ब्यूरो
- Patch of the NCB
- Abbreviation: NCB
- Motto: आसूचना प्रवर्तन समन्वय; Intelligence Enforcement Coordination

Agency overview
- Formed: 17 March 1986; 40 years ago
- Employees: 1001

Jurisdictional structure
- National agency (Operations jurisdiction): India
- Operations jurisdiction: India
- Legal jurisdiction: National Jurisdiction
- Primary governing body: Government of India
- Secondary governing body: Ministry of Home Affairs (India)

Operational structure
- Headquarters: West Block No. 1, Wing No. V, R.K. Puram, New Delhi, Delhi
- Minister responsible: Amit Shah, Minister of Home Affairs
- Agency executive: Anurag Garg, IPS, Director General
- Parent agency: Ministry of Home Affairs

Website
- www.narcoticsindia.nic.in

The Narcotics Control Bureau (abbr. NCB) is an Indian federal/central law enforcement and intelligence agency under the Ministry of Home Affairs, Government of India. The agency is tasked with combating drug trafficking and the use of illegal substances under the provisions of the Narcotic Drugs and Psychotropic Substances Act, 1985.

Established in 1986, it is responsible for coordination with the Indian state governments and other central departments, implementation of India's international obligations with regard to drug trafficking, and assisting international and foreign drug law enforcement agencies.

== Formation ==
The Narcotics Control Bureau was created on 17 March 1986 to enable the full implementation of the Narcotic Drugs and Psychotropic Substances Act, 1985 and fight its violation through the Prevention of Illicit Trafficking in Narcotic Drugs and Psychotropic Substances Act, 1988. The law was established to fulfill India's treaty obligations under the Single Convention on Narcotic Drugs, Convention on Psychotropic Substances, and United Nations Convention Against Illicit Traffic in Narcotic Drugs and Psychotropic Substances. Officers in this organisation are drawn from Indian Revenue Service, Indian Police Service and paramilitary forces in addition to directly recruited members.

== Organisation ==
The Narcotics Control Bureau's national headquarters is located in Delhi, the national capital. Its field units and offices are organised by zones and are located in Mumbai, Indore, Kolkata, Delhi, Chennai, Lucknow, Jodhpur, Chandigarh, Jammu, Ahmedabad, Bengaluru, Guwahati and Patna. In the wake of recent cadre restructuring in NCB, new offices were opened at Agartala, Raipur, Visakhapatnam, Gorakhpur, Jalpaiguri, Itanagar, Bhopal, Cochin, Jaipur, and Srinagar. Further, erstwhile sub-zonal units viz Amritsar, Dehradun, Mandi, Mandsaur, Imphal etc. were upgraded to Zonal units in same locations or shifted to other location for better drug law enforcement, keeping in view of newer trends in drug trafficking.

The Director General of NCB is mostly an officer from the Indian Police Service (IPS) or the Indian Revenue Service (IRS). Apart from the direct feeder grade, officers in this organisation are also drawn from Indian Revenue Service, Indian Police Service and other Paramilitary forces.

The Narcotics Control Bureau is also represented on the Economic Intelligence Council. NCB is affiliated to Home Ministry, which was made responsible for administering The Narcotic Drugs and Psychotropic Substances Act, 1985. The NCB is outside the ambit of the Right to information Act under Section 24(1) of the RTI act 2005.

== Functions ==
The chief purpose of the Narcotics Control Bureau is to fight drug trafficking on an all-India level. It works in close cooperation with the Customs and Central Excise/GST, State Police Department, State Excise and Prohibition Department, Central Bureau of Investigation (CBI), Central Economic Intelligence Bureau (CEIB) and other Indian intelligence and law enforcement agencies both at the national and states level. The NCB also provides resources and training to the personnel of India's Drug Law Enforcement Agencies in fighting drug trafficking. The NCB also monitors India's frontiers to track down points where smuggling activities take place with foreign traffickers.

== See also ==
- Central Bureau of Investigation, anti organised crime which are international, multi-state or multi-agency
- Directorate of Revenue Intelligence, anti-smuggling
- Enforcement Directorate, anti economic crimes
- Financial Intelligence Unit, anti money laundering
- National Investigation Agency, anti terrorism
- NIA Most Wanted
- Indian Intelligence Community
- Central Bureau of Narcotics (CBN)
- Directorate of GST Intelligence (DGSTI)
