= Indian Cyber Crime Coordination Centre =

Cyber crime prevention organization in India

Indian Cyber Crime Coordination Centre (Helpline 1930)
- भारतीय साइबर अपराध समन्वय केंद्र
- Motto: Digital Awareness
- Type of project: Cyber Suraksha
- Country: India
- Prime Minister(s): Narendra Modi
- Ministry: Ministry of Home Affairs (India)
- Launched: January 2018; 8 years ago New Delhi
- Budget: ₹782 crore (US$81 million)
- Status: Active
- Website: cybercrime.gov.in/Default.aspx

The Indian Cyber Crime Coordination Centre (I4C) (1930; Hindi: भारतीय साइबर अपराध समन्वय केंद्र) is a government initiative to deal with cybercrime in India, in a coordinated and effective manner. It is affiliated to the Ministry of Home Affairs, Government of India. The scheme was approved in October 2018 with a proposed amount of ₹415.86 crore (US$43 million).

== History ==
The scheme to set up the Indian Cyber Crime Coordination Centre was approved in October 2018 by the Ministry of Home Affairs. It was inaugurated in New Delhi in January 2020 by Amit Shah, the Home Minister of India.

In June 2020, on the recommendation of I4C, the Government of India banned 59 Chinese origin mobile apps.

In October 2023, Google launched DigiKavach to protect Indian users from online fraud, to work with Indian Cyber Crime Coordination Centre.

== Overview ==
The Indian Cyber Crime Coordination Centre has 7 components:

1. National Cyber Crime Threat Analytics Unit (TAU)
2. National Cyber Crime Reporting Portal
3. National Cyber Crime Training Centre
4. Cyber Crime Ecosystem Management Unit
5. National Cyber Crime Research and Innovation Centre
6. National Cyber Crime Forensic Laboratory (NCFL) Ecosystem
7. Platform for Joint Cyber Crime Investigation Team

== International collaboration ==
A memorandum of understanding (MoU) for collaboration in cybercrime investigation was signed by the United States and India on January 17, 2025. Acting U.S. Deputy Secretary of Homeland Security (DHS) Kristie Canegallo and the Ambassador of India to the United States Vinay Mohan Kwatra signed the deal. The agreement will be implemented by the Homeland Security Investigations Cyber Crimes Center, U.S. Immigration and Customs Enforcement, and Indian Cybercrime Coordination Center.

== See also ==
- National Cyber Coordination Centre
- Cybercrime in India
