= Central Economic Intelligence Bureau =

Indian intelligency agency

Central Economic Intelligence Bureau केंद्रीय आर्थिक आसूचना ब्यूरो
- Logo of CEIB
- Common name: Central Economic Intelligence
- Motto: "नवारंभः अन्यारंभ स्यांतादायाति"; Every Beginning Comes From Another Beginning's End

Agency overview
- Formed: July 1985

Jurisdictional structure
- Federal agency (Operations jurisdiction): India
- Operations jurisdiction: India
- INDIA
- Area: India
- Legal jurisdiction: COFEPOSA Act,1974 SAFEMA (FOP) Act,1976 SAFEMA (FOP) Rules, 2006
- Governing body: Government of India
- General nature: Federal law enforcement

Operational structure
- Headquarters: New Delhi, India
- Agency executive: Amit Mohan Govil, IRS, Director General
- Parent agency: Department of Revenue
- Child agency: Interpol National Central Bureau India branch
- Units: Economic Intelligence Council
- Regional offices: Regional Economic Intelligence Council

Facilities
- Offices: 40

Website
- ceib.gov.in

The Central Economic Intelligence Bureau (CEIB) is an Indian intelligence agency responsible for gathering information and monitoring the economic and financial sectors for economic offences and warfare.

== Formation ==
The Central Economic Intelligence Bureau was established in July 1985 responsible to the Department of Revenue, Ministry of Finance. Along with the Income Tax Department and Customs & CGST Department it is India's chief agency responsible for economic intelligence, monitoring and fighting economic offences such as smuggling, money laundering, tax evasion and fraud.

== Organisation ==
The Central Economic Intelligence Bureau is headed by a Director General, who also carries the designation of Special Secretary to the Government of India. The CEIB is the chief constituent of the Economic Intelligence Council and its functions are overseen by the Finance Minister of India. The sanctioned strength of the Bureau includes two Deputy Directors General and Joint Secretaries, a Joint Secretary (COFEPOSA), five Assistant Directors General, four Under Secretaries and eight Senior Technical Officers. Including intelligence officers and secretarial staff, the total strength of the bureau stands at 133.

== Functions ==
1. To collect information on various illegal economic activities and monitor sensitive and susceptible sectors of the Indian economy and financial sector.
2. To ensure the full implementation of the Conservation of Foreign Exchange and Prevention of Smuggling Activities Act, 1974 (COFEPOSA). It is also responsible for developing methods to counter such crimes and criminal organisations involved.
3. It is the chief coordinator of other agencies in the Ministry of Finance that are responsible for fighting economic offences, as well as the agencies of state governments.
4. It also cooperates and liaisons with the Central Bureau of Investigation (CBI), Central Board of Indirect Taxes and Customs (CBIC), Directorate of Revenue Intelligence (DRI), Central Board of Direct Taxes (CBDT), etc.
5. The CEIB also cooperates at the international level with the agencies of other countries responsible for customs, drugs and economic law enforcement.

== See also ==
- Directorate of Revenue Intelligence
