= Cyberpeace Foundation =

Indian Non-profit Cyber security Organization

CyberPeace Foundation
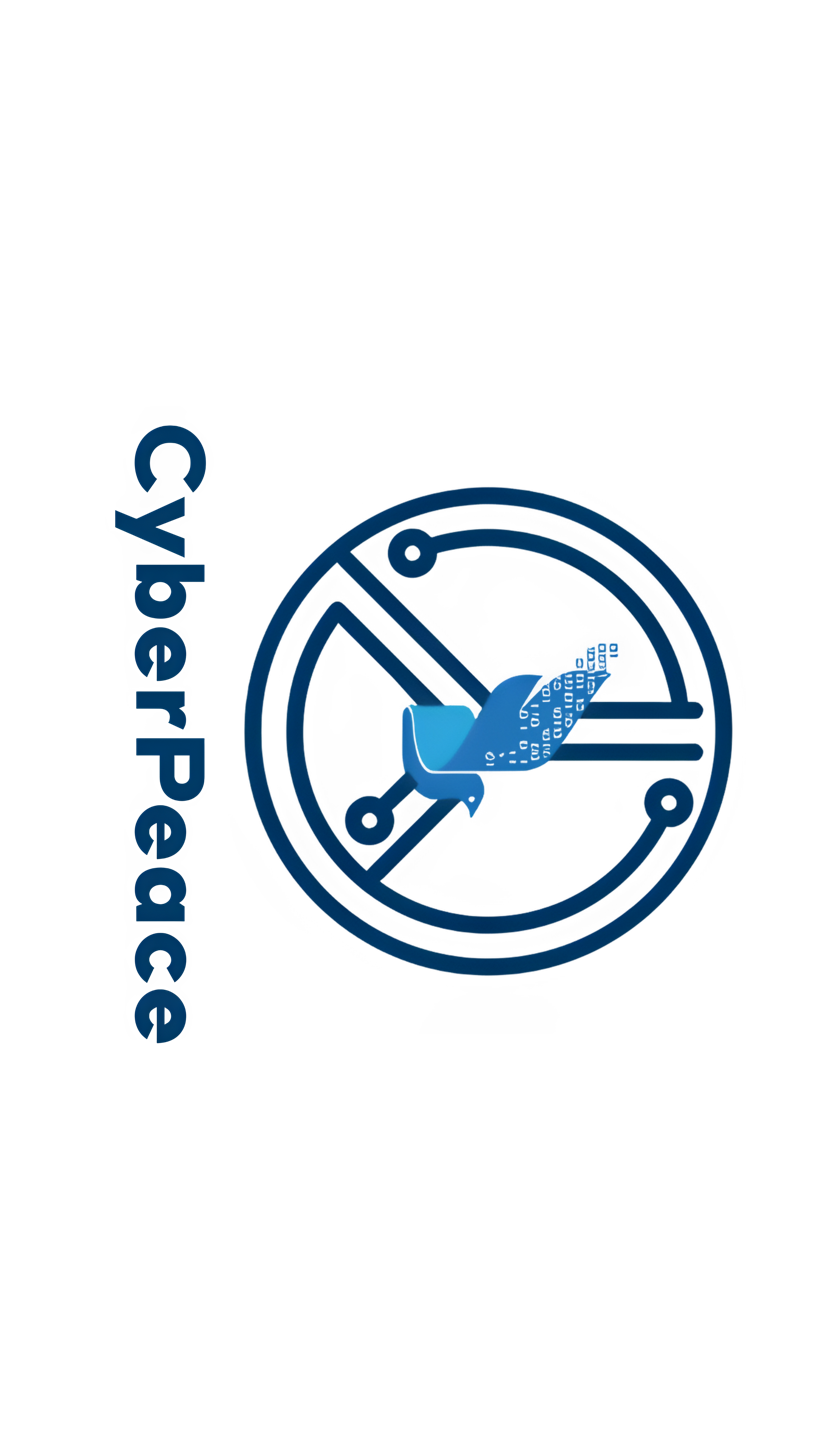
- CyberPeace Logo
- Formation: 2005
- Founder: Vineet Kumar
- Type: Non-Profit
- Legal status: Foundation
- Purpose: Towards a peaceful cyberspace for all.
- Headquarters: New Delhi
- Founder & Global President: Vineet Kumar
- Website: www.cyberpeace.org

CyberPeace Foundation is an Indian nonpartisan, nonprofit organization of Cyber Security that works to build resilience against cyberattack and cybercrimes. CyberPeace closely works with several state and national governments, educational Institutions worldwide and the United Nations.

The Organization is registered with NITI Aayog and the member of UN Global Compact Network India.

== History and notable cases ==
CyberPeace Foundation was established in 2005 by Vineet Kumar, a former chief technical officer of Jharkhand Police. CPF was registered as a Society under the Societies Registration Act, 1860 in 2013. The organization was formed with the vision of pioneering cyber peace initiatives to build collective resilience against cybercrime and global threats of cyber warfare.

From its beginning in 2013, CPF rallied tremendous support from several patrons and advisors and slowly grew in size and scale in the following years.

In January 2015, CyberPeace Foundation collaborated with Gujarat Technological University launched e-Raksha Research Centre to fight Cybercrime with the goal of establishing a peaceful cyber space.

The foundation was associated with UNICEF for cyber bullying and online child safety specially during the COVID-19 pandemic.

In July 2019, CyberPeace Foundation and Data Security Council of India with the support of Google, complete a capacity building initiative for law enforcement officers on cyber crime investigations.

In 2017, the foundation helped national Government to protect Aadhaar details of Individuals specially when sudden cases of Aadhaar Information leak increased in Jharkhand.

CPF has also initiated the first ever platform dedicated to Cyber Diplomacy issues across the world which brings to the forefront evidence-rich narratives and opinions from experts.

CyberPeace Foundation works towards Internet Governance and Cyber Security and also involved in Policy advocacy, Research and training related to all aspects of Cyber peace and cyber security.

In December 2018, The Digital Shakti campaign was launched by CyberPeace Foundation in collaboration with Facebook and National Commission for Women. It was for raising awareness among young women about online resilience and safety. The Cyberpeace Foundation's team interacted with 60,000 women across six states in India. On Feb 2020, CPF launched the second phase of Digital Shakti Campaign with an aim to train 1,10,000 women across India.

In August 2019, OLX partnered with CyberPeace Foundation for safe internet practices.

In January 2020, the CyberPeace Foundation and the National Crime Records Bureau together designed CCTNS Hackathon and Cyber Challenge 2020 with the aim to enhance skills and knowledge of law enforcement individuals at ground level.

On Feb 2020, Facebook launched ‘We Think Digital’, a literacy programme for women in Uttar Pradesh, India in collaboration with NCW and CyberPeace Foundation.

CyberPeace Foundation, in collaboration with NCERT and UNESCO, New Delhi, launched the eRaksha Competition 2020 focussed on Digital Citizenship, Online Safety and tackling fake news & misinformation. In May 2021, the third eRaksha Competition was launched.

CPF also partners with many Government and Non-Governmental Organizations to support them in fighting against the Cyber Crime.

In May 2021, the Ministry of Education along with All India Council for Technical Education and CyberPeace Foundation, launched a digital training Project eSaksham to train 5 lakh students.

== Campaign ==
On March 16, 2022 #SurakshaThon2022, a Capture The Flag (CTF) #Hackathon jointly organized by Rashtriya Raksha University, Gujarat and CyberPeace Foundation under the Conference on Information Security in Government Organisations 2022
