= National Technical Research Organisation =

Technical intelligence agency of India

- Logo of the NTRO

Intelligence agency overview
- Formed: 2004; 22 years ago
- Type: Technical intelligence
- Jurisdiction: Government of India
- Headquarters: New Delhi, Delhi, India
- Motto: IAST: āno bhadra krtavo yantu vishwatah (Let noble thoughts come to me from all directions)
- Employees: Classified
- Annual budget: Classified
- Minister responsible: Narendra Modi, Prime Minister of India
- Intelligence agency executive: Rajesh Arya, IPS, Chairman
- Parent department: Prime Minister's Office (PMO)
- Child agencies: National Critical Information Infrastructure Protection Centre (NCIIPC); National Institute of Cryptology Research and Development (NICRD)
- Website: ntro.gov.in

The National Technical Research Organisation (NTRO) is a technical intelligence agency of India. It was set up in 2004. The agency reports to the National Security Advisor and to the Prime Minister's Office. NTRO also comprises the National Critical Information Infrastructure Protection Centre and the National Institute of Cryptology Research and Development.

NTRO has the same "norms of conduct" as the Intelligence Bureau (IB) and the Research and Analysis Wing (R&AW).

== History ==
The National Technical Research Organisation (NTRO), originally known as the National Technical Facilities Organisation (NTFO), is a highly specialised technical intelligence gathering agency. While the agency does not affect the working of technical wings of various intelligence agencies, including those of the Indian Armed Forces, it acts as a super-feeder agency for providing technical intelligence to other agencies on internal and external security. The Group of Ministers (GOM) headed by then Deputy Prime Minister L. K. Advani had recommended the constitution of the NTFO as a state-of-the-art technical wing of intelligence gathering. Due to security concerns, the recommendation along with such other matters were not made public when the GOM report was published. The organisation does hi-tech surveillance jobs, including satellite monitoring, terrestrial monitoring, internet monitoring, considered vital for the national security apparatus. The NTRO would require over ₹700 crore (US$75 million) to procure different hi-tech equipment from specialised agencies around the globe to become fully functional. The officials have identified countries from where such gadgets could be procured but refused to reveal them due to 'security and other implications'. The Government had been working in this direction after the Kargil war in 1999 when the Subrahmanyam committee report pointed out weaknesses in intelligence gathering in the national security set up. Sources said the road-map for constitution of the National Technical Facilities Organisation was prepared by Dr A P J Abdul Kalam in October 2001 when he was the Principal Scientific Adviser. It was subsequently mentioned in the Group of Ministers report on internal security.

In October 2004, the Cabinet Committee on Security (CCS) approved setting up of NTRO, a spy organisation for technical intelligence, modelled on the National Security Agency (NSA) of the United States, which would be the repository of the country's technical intelligence (TECHINT) assets—spy satellites, UAVs and spy planes.

== Organisation ==
The agency specialises in multiple disciplines, which include remote sensing, SIGINT, data gathering and processing, cyber security, geospatial information gathering, cryptology, strategic hardware and software development and strategic monitoring.

The National Critical Information Infrastructure Protection Centre, an agency under the control of National Technical Research Organisation, has been created to monitor, intercept and assess threats to crucial infrastructure and other vital installations from intelligence gathered using sensors and platforms which include satellites, underwater buoys, drones, VSAT-terminal locators and fiber-optic cable nodal tap points.

It also includes National Institute of Cryptology Research and Development (NICRD), which is first of its kind in Asia.

NTRO operates the Technology Experiment Satellite (TES), Cartosat-2A, EMISAT and Cartosat-2B besides two Radar Imaging Satellites namely RISAT-1 & RISAT-2. RISAT-2 was acquired from Israel at a cost $110 million and placed into orbit using a PSLV launcher in 2009.

NTRO, along with the Indian Air Force (IAF) operates a number of Very Long Range Tracking Radar (VLRTR) arrays. VLRTR are used for missile monitoring and early detection of threats in aid of ballistic missile defence. These VLRTR sites are located at Udaipur, Bhopal and Balasore.

== Hierarchy ==
Ranks, designations, and positions held by NTRO scientists in their career
Grade / Scale (Level on Pay Matrix)	Posting in NTRO	Position in Government of India	Position in Order of precedence in India	Pay Scale (Basic Pay)
Apex Scale (Pay Level 17)	Chairman, NTRO	Secretary	23	₹225,000 (US$2,400)
Higher Administrative Grade + (Pay Level 16)	Distinguished Scientist (DS) Director General	Additional Secretary	25	₹205,400 (US$2,200)—₹224,400 (US$2,400)
Higher Administrative Grade (Pay Level 15)	Scientist 'H' (Outstanding Scientist) Director	Additional Secretary	25	₹182,200 (US$1,900)—₹224,100 (US$2,400)
Senior Administrative Grade (Pay Level 14)	Scientist 'G' Associate Director	Joint Secretary	26	₹144,200 (US$1,500)—₹218,200 (US$2,300)
Selection Grade (Pay Level 13A)	Scientist 'F' Additional Director	Director		₹131,100 (US$1,400)—₹216,600 (US$2,300)
Selection Grade (Pay Level 13)	Scientist 'E' Additional Director	Director		₹123,100 (US$1,300)—₹215,900 (US$2,300)
Junior Administrative Grade (Pay Level 12)	Scientist 'D' Joint Director (JAG)	Deputy Secretary		₹78,800 (US$840)—₹209,200 (US$2,200)
Senior Time Scale (Pay Level 11)	Scientist 'C' Deputy Director	Under Secretary		₹67,700 (US$720)—₹208,700 (US$2,200)
Junior Time Scale (Pay Level 10)	Scientist 'B' Assistant Director; Entry-level	Assistant Secretary		₹56,100 (US$600)—₹177,500 (US$1,900)

NTRO follows the merit-based promotion system for its Group A scientists rather than the seniority-based promotion system which is followed by the other civil services of India. The merit-based promotions ensure that only the exceptionally performing scientists are promoted to higher grades irrespective of their seniority and it is common to see a junior scientist superseding his seniors.

== Activities ==
NTRO has been one of the most proactive members of the United States' NSA-led 10-member counter-terrorism platform called SIGINT Seniors Pacific (SSPAC) for the last 10 years, a recent tranche of classified documents recently released by whistleblower Edward Snowden to a website suggests.

In September 2013, the Madhya Pradesh government allotted 180 hectares of land to set up the NTRO at Borda village near Bhopal.

In December 2014, based on COMINT provided by NTRO, the Indian Coast Guard intercepted a Pakistani fishing boat in the Arabian Sea near the Indo-Pakistan maritime boundary, approximately 365 km from Porbander. After few hours of chase and standoff, coast guard fired at the boat thus killing all the 4 occupants. The Coast Guard officials stated that the occupants were terrorists and were on their way to undertake a 26/11-type attack.

During the 2016 Line of Control strike, NTRO played an important role by providing satellite intelligence to operational advisors and planners. Cartosat-2C, Cartosat-1, Resourcesat-2 satellites operated by NTRO, were used to provide the imagery of terrorist training camps in Pakistan-administered Kashmir.

During the 2019 Balakot airstrike, NTRO also played an important role. NTRO surveillance confirmed 300 targets via active mobile connections in Markaz Syed Ahmad Shaheed training camp, just few days before IAF airstrike.

It also operates India's ocean surveillance ship named INS Dhruv, jointly with the Indian Navy.

In 2025, the NTRO provided critical technical intelligence—including satellite imagery and electronic surveillance—to identify, track, and verify the precise locations of terrorist hideouts targeted during Operation Sindoor.

== Relationship with other agencies ==
In 2007, it was reported that key cabinet approvals by the Cabinet Committee on Security (CCS), even after three years, had not been implemented. This delay was attributed to an alleged "turf war" between NTRO and the Aviation Research Centre (ARC)—the technical and airborne division of the Research and Analysis Wing (R&AW). NTRO was meant to utilise spy satellites, unmanned aerial vehicles (UAVs), and surveillance aircraft. However, NTRO possessed only satellites, while ARC had aircraft. Consequently, the government received airborne intelligence from R&AW and satellite imagery from NTRO, undermining the purpose of having a single agency for technical intelligence. Efforts to procure aircraft with advanced technology compared to ARC's capabilities was stalled by the government, allegedly due to R&AW's interference. Furthermore, NTRO lacked sanction for computer hacking and monitoring, and it could collect data but lacked authorisation to analyse it. NTRO as a technical intelligence repository also failed as both the Intelligence Bureau (IB) and R&AW refused to share their data, as per media reports at that time.

In February 2010, the NTRO became the first Indian intelligence agency to be audited by the Comptroller and Auditor General of India (CAG), which audited their purchases and expenditure. In April 2013, the Department of Electronics and Information Technology (DeitY) accused NTRO of hacking into their National Informatics Center (NIC) network. DeitY cited a report prepared by its operations division, the Indian Computer Emergency Response Team (ICERT), listing all instances when NTRO reportedly hacked into NIC infrastructure and extracted data connected to various ministries. However, the NTRO denied the allegation. Earlier, NTRO had asked NIC to give access to their logs for penetration testing, which NIC refused.

== See also ==
- NATGRID
- NETRA
- Central Monitoring System
- Telecom Enforcement Resource and Monitoring
- Multi Agency Centre (India)
- Indian Intelligence Community
