= National Critical Information Infrastructure Protection Centre =

Indian government organization

- Emblem of India

Agency overview
- Formed: 16 Jan 2014
- Headquarters: New Delhi, Delhi, India
- Agency executive: DG, NCIIPC
- Parent department: National Technical Research Organisation
- Website: https://www.nciipc.gov.in/

National Critical Information Infrastructure Protection Centre (NCIIPC) is an organisation of the Government of India created under Section 70A of the Information Technology Act, 2000 (amended 2008), through a gazette notification on 16 January 2014. Based in New Delhi, India, it is designated as the National Nodal Agency in terms of Critical Information Infrastructure Protection. It is a unit of the National Technical Research Organisation (NTRO) and therefore comes under the Prime Minister's Office (PMO).

== Critical Information Infrastructure ==
The Information Technology Act, 2000 defines Critical Information Infrastructure (CII) as “… those computer resource, the incapacitation or destruction of which, shall have debilitating impact on national security, economy, public health or safety".

NCIIPC has broadly identified the following as ‘Critical Sectors’ :-

- Power & Energy
- Banking, Financial Services & Insurance
- Telecom
- Transport
- Government
- Strategic & Public Enterprises

Information Security Practices and Procedures for Protected System Rules, 2018

== Vision ==
"To facilitate safe, secure and resilient Information Infrastructure for Critical Sectors of the Nation."

== Mission ==
"To take all necessary measures to facilitate protection of Critical Information Infrastructure, from unauthorized access, modification, use, disclosure, disruption, incapacitation or destruction through coherent coordination, synergy and raising information security awareness among all stakeholders. "

== Functions and Duties ==
- National nodal agency for all measures to protect the nation's critical information infrastructure.
- Protect and deliver advice that aims to reduce the vulnerabilities of critical information infrastructure, against cyber terrorism, cyber warfare and other threats.
- Identification of all critical information infrastructure elements for approval by the appropriate Government for notifying the same.
- Provide strategic leadership and coherence across Government to respond to cyber security threats against the identified critical information infrastructure.
- Coordinate, share, monitor, collect, analyze and forecast, national-level threats to CII for policy guidance, expertise sharing and situational awareness for early warning or alerts. The basic responsibility for protecting CII system shall lie with the agency running that CII.
- Assisting in the development of appropriate plans, adoption of standards, sharing of best practices and refinement of procurement processes in respect of protection of Critical Information Infrastructure.
- Evolving protection strategies, policies, vulnerability assessment and auditing methodologies and plans for their dissemination and implementation for protection of Critical Information Infrastructure.
- Undertaking research and development and allied activities, providing funding (including grants-in-aid) for creating, collaborating and development of innovative future technology for developing and enabling the growth of skills, working closely with wider public sector industries, academia et al. and with international partners for protection of Critical Information Infrastructure.
- Developing or organising training and awareness programs as also nurturing and developing of audit and certification agencies for protection of Critical Information Infrastructure.
- Developing and executing national and international cooperation strategies for protection of Critical Information Infrastructure.
- Issuing guidelines, advisories and vulnerability or audit notes etc. relating to protection of critical information infrastructure and practices, procedures, prevention and response in consultation with the stakeholders, in close coordination with Indian Computer Emergency Response Team and other organisations working in the field or related fields.
- Exchanging cyber incidents and other information relating to attacks and vulnerabilities with Indian Computer Emergency Response Team and other concerned organisations in the field.
- In the event of any threat to critical information infrastructure, the National Critical Information Infrastructure Protection Centre may call for information and give directions to the critical sectors or persons serving or having a critical impact on Critical Information Infrastructure.

== Operations ==
- NCIIPC maintains a 24x7 Help Desk to facilitate reporting of incidents. Toll Free No. 1800-11-4430.
- Issues advisories or alerts and provide guidance and expertise-sharing in addressing the threats/vulnerabilities for protection of CII.
- In the event of a likely/actual national-level threat, it plays a pivotal role to coordinate the response of the various CII stakeholders in close cooperation with CERT-India.

== Programs ==
NCIIPC runs a number of programs to engage with its stakeholders. Some of them are as follows:

- Responsible Vulnerability Disclosure Program (RVDP)
- Incident Response (IR)
- Malware Reporting
- Internship Courses
- Research Scholars, etc.

== Initiatives ==
Some of the major NCIIPC initiatives are as follows:

- Incident Response and Responsible Vulnerability Disclosure program- NCIIPC runs these programs for reporting any Vulnerability in Critical Information Infrastructures.
- PPP for Training- Identification of PPP entities for partnership and formulation of training requirements and guidelines for conducting training for all stakeholders.
- CII Range to simulate real world threat– IT and OT simulations for critical sectors to test the defense of CII.
- Cyber Security Preparedness Survey, Risk Assessment, Audit, review and Compliance.
- Interns, Research Scholars & Cyber Security professionals- NCIIPC Internship program (both Full-time and Part-time) is available throughout the year.

== NCIIPC Newsletter ==
NCIIPC releases its quarterly newsletter encompassing latest developments in the field of Critical Information Infrastructure (CII) and its protection along with various initiatives taken by NCIIPC to spread awareness and best practices and much more.

- April 2024
- January 2024
- October 2023
- July 2023
- April 2023
- January 2023
- October 2022
- July 2022
- April 2022
- January 2022
- October 2021
- July 2021
- April 2021
- January 2021
- October 2020
- July 2020
- April 2020
- January 2020
- October 2019
- July 2019
- April 2019
- January 2019
- October 2018
- July 2018
- April 2018
- January 2018
- October 2017
- July 2017
- April 2017
- January 2017

== NCIIPC Guidelines ==
NCIIPC releases SOPs and Guidelines for CISOs, CII Organisations and others to enhance the cybersecurity defence posture. Below are the copies:

- Cyber Security Audit : Baseline Requirements
- NCIIPC COVID-19 Guidelines
- SOP : Public-Private-Partnership
- Guidelines for Identification of CII
- Rules for the Information Security Practices and Procedures for Protected System
- National Cyber Security Policy, 2013
- Roles and Responsibilities of CISOs
- Guidelines for Protection of CII
- Evaluating Cyber Security in CII
- SOP : Incident Response
- SOP : Audit of CII/Protected Systems
