= Directorate of Naval Intelligence (India) =

The Directorate of Naval Intelligence is the intelligence arm of the Indian Navy.
