= Mobile network codes in ITU region 4xx (Asia) =

This list contains the mobile country codes and mobile network codes for networks with country codes between 400 and 499, inclusively – a region that covers Asia and the Middle East. However, the Asian parts of the Russian Federation and Turkey are included in Mobile Network Codes in ITU region 2xx (Europe), while Maritime South East Asia and Thailand are listed under Mobile Network Codes in ITU region 5xx (Oceania).

== National operators ==
=== A ===
==== Afghanistan – AF ====
MCC	MNC	Brand	Operator	Status	Bands (MHz)	References and notes
412	01	AWCC	Afghan Wireless Communication Company	Operational	GSM 900 / GSM 1800 / UMTS 2100 / LTE 1800	
412	20	Roshan	Telecom Development Company Afghanistan Ltd.	Operational	GSM 900 / UMTS 2100	
412	40	ATOMA	M1 Group Afghanistan	Operational	GSM 900 / GSM 1800 / UMTS 2100	Former MTN Group Afghanistan
412	50	Etisalat	Etisalat Afghanistan	Operational	GSM 900 / GSM 1800 / UMTS 2100 / LTE 1800	
412	55	WASEL	WASEL Afghanistan	Operational	CDMA 800	
412	80	Salaam	Afghan Telecom	Operational	GSM 900 / GSM 1800 / UMTS 2100 / LTE 1800	
412	88	Salaam	Afghan Telecom	Operational	GSM 900 / GSM 1800 / UMTS 2100 / LTE 1800	

==== Azerbaijan – AZ ====
MCC	MNC	Brand	Operator	Status	Bands (MHz)	References and notes
400	01	Azercell	Azercell Telecom LLC	Operational	GSM 900 / GSM 1800 / UMTS 2100 / LTE 1800	
400	02	Bakcell	Bakcell LLC	Operational	GSM 900 / GSM 1800 / UMTS 900 / UMTS 2100 / LTE 1800	
400	03	FONEX	CATEL	Operational	CDMA 450	
400	04	Nar Mobile	Azerfon	Operational	GSM 900 / GSM 1800 / UMTS 2100 / LTE 1800	
400	05		Special State Protection Service of the Republic of Azerbaijan	Unknown	TETRA?	
400	06	Naxtel	Nakhtel LLC	Not Operational	CDMA 800 / LTE 800 / LTE 900 / LTE 1800	shut down Dec 2025

=== B ===
==== Bahrain – BH ====
MCC	MNC	Brand	Operator	Status	Bands (MHz)	References and notes
426	01	Batelco	Bahrain Telecommunications Company	Operational	UMTS 2100 / LTE 1800 / 5G 3500	GSM shut down Nov 2021
426	02	zain BH	Zain Bahrain	Operational	GSM 900 / GSM 1800 / UMTS 2100 / LTE 1800 / 5G 3500	
426	03		Civil Aviation Authority	Unknown	Unknown	
426	04	stc	Stc Bahrain	Operational	GSM 900 / GSM 1800 / UMTS 2100 / LTE 800 / LTE 1800 / 5G 3500	Former VIVA
426	05	Batelco	Bahrain Telecommunications Company	Operational	GSM 900 / GSM 1800	Royal Court use only
426	06	stc	Stc Bahrain	Unknown	Unknown	
426	07		TAIF	Unknown	Unknown	

==== Bangladesh – BD ====
MCC	MNC	Brand	Operator	Status	Bands (MHz)	References and notes
470	01	Grameenphone	Grameenphone Ltd.	Operational	GSM 900 / GSM 1800 / UMTS 2100 / LTE 1800 / 5G	
470	02	Robi	Axiata Bangladesh Ltd.	Operational	GSM 900 / GSM 1800 / UMTS 2100 / LTE 900 / LTE 1800 / LTE 2100 / LTE 2600 / 5G	Formerly Aktel
470	03	Banglalink	Banglalink Digital Communications Ltd.	Operational	GSM 900 / GSM 1800 / UMTS 2100 / LTE 1800 / LTE 2100 / TD-LTE 2300	VEON
470	04	Teletalk	Teletalk Bangladesh Limited	Operational	GSM 900 / UMTS 2100 / LTE 1800	
470	05	Citycell	Pacific Bangladesh Telecom Limited	Not Operational	CDMA 800	Shutdown by Bangladesh Telecommunication Regulatory Commission in 2016
470	07	Airtel	Bharti Airtel Bangladesh Ltd.	Operational	GSM 900 / GSM 1800 / UMTS 2100	Formerly Warid Telcom, later Airtel. Currently merged with Robi keeping brand name Airtel
470	09	ollo	Bangladesh Internet Exchange Limited (BIEL)	Not operational	LTE 800 / LTE 2600 / WiMAX 3500	shut down 2019
470	10	Banglalion	Banglalion Communications Ltd.	Operational	TD-LTE 2600 / WiMAX 3500	

==== Bhutan – BT ====
MCC	MNC	Brand	Operator	Status	Bands (MHz)	References and notes
402	11	B-Mobile	Bhutan Telecom Limited	Operational	GSM 900 / UMTS 850 / UMTS 2100 / LTE 1800 / 5G	
402	17	B-Mobile	Bhutan Telecom Limited	Unknown	Unknown	
402	77	TashiCell	Tashi InfoComm Limited	Operational	GSM 900 / GSM 1800 / UMTS 850 / LTE 700 / 3G 3500	LTE band 28

=== C ===
==== Cambodia – KH ====
MCC	MNC	Brand	Operator	Status	Bands (MHz)	References and notes
456	01	Cellcard	CamGSM / The Royal Group	Operational	GSM 900 / GSM 1800 / UMTS 2100 / LTE 1800	Former Mobitel
456	02	Smart	Smart Axiata Co. Ltd	Operational	GSM 900 / GSM 1800 / UMTS 2100 / LTE 1800 / LTE 2100	
456	03	qb	Cambodia Advance Communications Co. Ltd	Not Operational	GSM 1800 / UMTS 2100	aka CADCOMMS
456	04	qb	Cambodia Advance Communications Co. Ltd	Not Operational	GSM 1800 / UMTS 2100	aka CADCOMMS
456	05	Smart	Smart Axiata Co. Ltd	Operational	GSM 900 / GSM 1800 / UMTS 2100 / LTE 1800 / LTE 2100	
456	06	Smart	Smart Axiata Co. Ltd	Operational	GSM 900 / GSM 1800 / UMTS 2100 / LTE 1800 / LTE 2100	
456	08	Metfone	Viettel	Operational	GSM 900 / GSM 1800 / UMTS 2100 / LTE 1800	
456	09	Metfone	Viettel	Operational	GSM 900 / GSM 1800 / UMTS 2100 / LTE 1800	Former Beeline
456	11	SEATEL	SEATEL Cambodia	Operational	LTE 850 / LTE 2600	Former Excell CDMA shut down 27 June 2015
456	18	Cellcard	The Royal Group	Operational	GSM 900 / GSM 1800 / UMTS 2100 / LTE 1800	Former Mfone

==== China – CN ====
MCC	MNC	Brand	Operator	Status	Bands (MHz)	References and notes
460	00	China Mobile	China Mobile	Operational	GSM 900 / GSM 1800 / LTE 900 / LTE 1800 / TD-LTE 1900 / TD-LTE 2000 / TD-LTE 2300 / TD-LTE 2500 / 5G 700 / 5G 2500	
460	01	China Unicom	China Unicom	Operational	LTE 900 / LTE 1800 / LTE 2100 / TD-LTE 2300 / TD-LTE 2500 / 5G 700 / 5G 2100 / 5G 3500	CDMA network sold to China Telecom; GSM / UMTS shut down Dec 2023
460	02	China Mobile	China Mobile	Not operational	TD-SCDMA 1900 / TD-SCDMA 2000	TD-SCDMA network shut down in Jul 2019
460	03	China Telecom	China Telecom	Not operational	CDMA 800	CDMA2000 shut down in Dec 2023
460	04	China Mobile	Global Star Satellite	Unknown	Unknown	
460	05	China Telecom	China Telecom	Not operational	CDMA 800	CDMA2000 shut down in Dec 2023
460	06	China Unicom	China Unicom	Not operational	GSM 900 / GSM 1800 / UMTS 2100	GSM / UMTS shut down Dec 2023
460	07	China Mobile	China Mobile	Not operational	TD-SCDMA 1900 / TD-SCDMA 2000	TD-SCDMA network shut down in Jul 2019
460	08	China Mobile	China Mobile	Unknown	Unknown	
460	09	China Unicom	China Unicom	Operational	Unknown	
460	11	China Telecom	China Telecom	Operational	LTE 850 / LTE 1800 / LTE 2100 / TD-LTE 2300 / 5G 850 / 5G 2100 / 5G 3500	
460	15	China Broadnet	China Broadnet	Operational	LTE 900 / LTE 1800 / TD-LTE 1900 / TD-LTE 2000 / TD-LTE 2300 / 5G 700 / 5G 2500	Shared frequencies with China Mobile
460	20	China Tietong	China Tietong	Operational	GSM-R	

=== H ===
==== Hong Kong – HK ====
MCC	MNC	Brand	Operator	Status	Bands (MHz)	References and notes
454	00	1O1O / One2Free / New World Mobility / SUNMobile	CSL Limited	Operational	UMTS 900 / UMTS 2100 / LTE 900 / LTE 1800 / LTE 2600	GSM shut down Nov 2024
454	01		CITIC Telecom 1616	Operational	MVNO	MVNO on CSL network; network code operational only at land borders and Airport to attract inbound roamers to join 454-00
454	02		CSL Limited	Not operational	GSM 900 / GSM 1800	Network code operational only at land borders and Airport to attract inbound roamers to join 454-00; shut down Nov 2024
454	03	3	Hutchison Telecom	Operational	UMTS 900 / UMTS 2100 / LTE 900 / LTE 1800 / LTE 2100 / TD-LTE 2300 / LTE 2600 / 5G 700 / 5G 2100 / 5G 3500	
454	04	3 (2G)	Hutchison Telecom	Not operational	GSM 900 / GSM 1800	Shut down Sep 2021
454	05	3 (CDMA)	Hutchison Telecom	Not operational	CDMA 800	Shut down Nov 2008
454	06	SmarTone	SmarTone Mobile Communications Limited	Operational	LTE 900 / LTE 1800 / LTE 2100 / LTE 2600 / 5G 850 / 5G 3500 / 5G 4700 / 5G 28000	GSM shut down Oct 2022, UMTS Oct 2026
454	07	China Unicom	China Unicom (Hong Kong) Limited	Operational	MVNO	MVNO on 3 Hong Kong Mobile network code operational only at land borders and Airport to attract inbound roamers to join 454-16 or 454-19
454	08	Truphone	TP Hong Kong Operations Limited	Operational	MVNO	Former Trident
454	09		China Motion Telecom	Not operational	MVNO	MVNO on CSL network; MNC withdrawn
454	10	New World Mobility	CSL Limited	Not operational	GSM 1800	Signal Combined with 454-00
454	11		China-Hong Kong Telecom	Operational	MVNO	MVNO on PCCW Mobile and Hutchison Telecom networks
454	12	CMCC HK	China Mobile Hong Kong Company Limited	Operational	TD-SCDMA 2000 / LTE 900 / LTE 1800 / LTE 2100 / TD-LTE 2300 / LTE 2600 / 5G 700 / 5G 3500 / 5G 4700	Formerly Peoples; UMTS shut down June 2025, GSM shut down June 2026
454	13	CMCC HK	China Mobile Hong Kong Company Limited	Operational	MVNO	MVNO on PCCW Mobile (3G)
454	14		Hutchison Telecom	Not operational	GSM 900 / GSM 1800	Only at land borders and Airport to attract inbound roamers; shut down Sep 2021
454	15	SmarTone	SmarTone Mobile Communications Limited	Not operational	GSM 1800	Only at land borders and Airport to attract inbound roamers; shut down Oct 2022
454	16	PCCW Mobile (2G)	PCCW	Operational	GSM 1800	Formerly SUNDAY
454	17	SmarTone	SmarTone Mobile Communications Limited	Not operational	GSM 1800	Only at land borders and Airport to attract inbound roamers; shut down Oct 2022
454	18		CSL Limited	Not operational	GSM 900 / GSM 1800	
454	19	PCCW Mobile (3G)	PCCW-HKT	Operational	UMTS 2100	
454	20	PCCW Mobile (4G)	PCCW-HKT	Operational	LTE 1800 / LTE 2600 / 5G 700 / 5G 3500 / 5G 4700	
454	21		VNET Group Limited	Not operational	MVNO	Former 21Vianet Mobile Ltd.; closed on 1 February 2019
454	22		HuiYinBi Telecom (Hong Kong) Limited	Operational	MVNO	Former P Plus Communications, Delcom (HK) Ltd, 263 Mobile Communications (HK) Ltd
454	23	Lycamobile	Lycamobile Hong Kong Ltd	Not operational	MVNO	Closed on 27 April 2018; MNC withdrawn
454	24		Multibyte Info Technology Ltd	Operational	MVNO	
454	25		Hong Kong Government	Unknown	Unknown	
454	26		Hong Kong Government	Unknown	Unknown	
454	29	PCCW Mobile (CDMA)	PCCW-HKT	Not operational	CDMA 800	Shut down Oct 2017; MNC withdrawn
454	290		Hong Kong Government	Unknown	Unknown	Entire block to MNC 299
454	30	CMCC HK	China Mobile Hong Kong Company Limited	Unknown	Unknown	Former China Data Enterprises Ltd
454	31	CTExcel	China Telecom Global Limited	Operational	MVNO	
454	32		Hong Kong Broadband Network Ltd	Not operational	MVNO	MNC withdrawn
454	35		Webbing Hong Kong Ltd	Operational	MVNO	
454	36		Easco Telecommunications Limited	Not operational	Unknown	MNC withdrawn
454	380		Hong Kong Government	Unknown	Unknown	
454	382		South China Telecommunications (H.K.) Limited	Operational	MVNO	
454	383		China Mobile Hong Kong Company Limited	Unknown	Unknown	
454	390		Hong Kong Government	Unknown	Unknown	Entire block to MNC 399

=== I ===
==== India – IN ====
MCC	MNC	Brand	Operator	Status	Bands (MHz)	References and notes
404	01	Vi India	Haryana	Operational	GSM 900 / LTE 1800 / LTE 2100 / TD-LTE 2500	Former Vodafone India
404	02	AirTel	Punjab	Operational	GSM 900 / GSM 1800 / LTE 900 / LTE 1800 / LTE 2100 / TD-LTE 2300	
404	03	AirTel	Himachal Pradesh	Operational	GSM 900 / GSM 1800 / LTE 900 / LTE 1800 / LTE 2100 / TD-LTE 2300	
404	04	Vi India	Delhi & NCR	Not Operational	GSM 900 / GSM 1800 / UMTS 2100 / LTE 900 / LTE 1800 / LTE 2100 / TD-LTE 2500	Former IDEA
404	05	Vi India	Gujarat	Operational	GSM 900 / LTE 900 / LTE 1800 / LTE 2100 / TD-LTE 2500	Former Hutch, Fascel, Vodafone India
404	07	Vi India	Andhra Pradesh and Telangana	Operational	GSM 900 / UMTS 2100 / LTE 900 / LTE 1800 / LTE 2100 / TD-LTE 2500	Former IDEA
404	09	Reliance	Assam	Operational	LTE	Data-only as of 2020
404	10	AirTel	Delhi & NCR	Operational	GSM 900 / GSM 1800 / LTE 850 / LTE 900 / LTE 1800 / LTE 2100 / TD-LTE 2300	
404	11	Vi India	Delhi & NCR	Operational	GSM 900 / LTE 900 / LTE 1800 / LTE 2100 / TD-LTE 2500	Former Vodafone India
404	12	Vi India	Haryana	Not Operational	GSM 1800 / UMTS 2100 / LTE 1800 / LTE 2100 / TD-LTE 2500	Former Escotel, IDEA
404	13	Vi India	Andhra Pradesh and Telangana	Not Operational	GSM 900 / GSM 1800 / UMTS 2100 / LTE 900 / LTE 1800 / LTE 2100 / TD-LTE 2500	Former Vodafone India
404	14	Vi India	Punjab	Operational	GSM 900 / LTE 900 / LTE 1800 / LTE 2100 / TD-LTE 2500	Former Spice, IDEA
404	15	Vi India	Uttar Pradesh (East)	Operational	GSM 900 / LTE 900 / LTE 1800 / LTE 2100 / TD-LTE 2500	Former Vodafone India
404	16	Airtel	North East	Operational	GSM 900 / GSM 1800 / LTE 900 / LTE 1800 / LTE 2100 / TD-LTE 2300	Former Hexacom
404	17	AIRCEL	West Bengal	Not operational	GSM 900 / GSM 1800	Bankrupt in 2018
404	18	Reliance	Himachal Pradesh	Operational	LTE	Data-only as of 2020
404	19	Vi India	Kerala	Not Operational	GSM 900 / GSM 1800 / UMTS 2100 / LTE 900 / LTE 1800 / LTE 2100 / TD-LTE-2300 / TD-LTE 2500	Former Escotel, IDEA
404	20	Vi India	Mumbai	Operational	GSM 900 / LTE 900 / LTE 1800 / LTE 2100 / TD-LTE 2500 / 5G 3500	Former Hutchison Maxtouch, Orange, Hutch, Vodafone India
404	21	Loop Mobile	Mumbai	Not operational	GSM 900	Former BPL Mobile; licence expired 2014
404	22	Vi India	Maharashtra & Goa	Operational	GSM 900 / UMTS 2100 / LTE 900 / LTE 1800 / LTE 2100 / TD-LTE 2300 / TD-LTE 2500	Former IDEA
404	23	Reliance	West Bengal	Not Operational	LTE	Reliance Telecom
404	24	Vi India	Gujarat	Not Operational	GSM 900 / GSM 1800 / UMTS 2100 / LTE 900 / LTE 1800 / LTE 2100 / TD-LTE 2500	Former IDEA
404	25	AIRCEL	Bihar	Not operational	GSM 900 / GSM 1800	Bankrupt in 2018
404	27	Vi India	Maharashtra & Goa	Not Operational	GSM 900 / GSM 1800 / UMTS 2100 / LTE 900 / LTE 1800 / LTE 2100 / TD-LTE 2300 / TD-LTE 2500	Former Vodafone India
404	28	AIRCEL	Odisha	Not operational	GSM 900	Bankrupt in 2018
404	29	AIRCEL	Assam	Not operational	GSM 900	Bankrupt in 2018
404	30	Vi India	Kolkata	Operational	GSM 900 / UMTS 2100 / LTE 900 / LTE 1800 / LTE 2100 / TD-LTE 2500	Former Vodafone India, Command, Hutch
404	31	AirTel	Kolkata	Operational	GSM 900 / GSM 1800 / LTE 900 / LTE 1800 / TD-LTE 2300	
404	33	AIRCEL	North East	Not operational	GSM 900	Bankrupt in 2018
404	34	BSNL Mobile	Haryana	Operational	GSM 900 / UMTS 2100 / LTE 2100	Former CellOne
404	35	Aircel	Himachal Pradesh	Not operational	GSM 900 / GSM 1800	Bankrupt in 2018
404	36	Reliance	Bihar & Jharkhand	Operational	LTE	Data-only as of 2020
404	37	Aircel	Jammu & Kashmir	Not operational	GSM 900 / UMTS 2100	Bankrupt in 2018
404	38	BSNL Mobile	Assam	Operational	GSM 900 / UMTS 2100 / LTE 2100	Former CellOne
404	40	AirTel	Chennai	Operational	GSM 1800 / LTE 1800 / LTE 2100 / TD-LTE 2300	
404	41	Aircel	Chennai	Not operational	GSM 900	Former RPG; bankrupt in 2018
404	42	Aircel	Tamil Nadu	Not operational	GSM 900	Bankrupt in 2018
404	43	Vi India	Tamil Nadu	Operational	GSM 900 / UMTS 2100 / LTE 1800 / LTE 2100	Former Vodafone India
404	44	Vi India	Karnataka	Not Operational	GSM 900 / GSM 1800 / UMTS 2100 / LTE 900 / LTE 1800 / LTE 2100	Former Spice, IDEA
404	45	Airtel	Karnataka	Operational	GSM 900 / GSM 1800 / LTE 900 / LTE 1800 / LTE 2100 / TD-LTE 2300	
404	46	Vi India	Kerala	Operational	GSM 900 / UMTS 2100 / LTE 900 / LTE 1800 / LTE 2100 / TD-LTE-2300 / TD-LTE 2500	Former Vodafone India
404	48	Dishnet Wireless	Unknown	Not operational	GSM 900	
404	49	Airtel	Andhra Pradesh and Telangana	Operational	GSM 900 / GSM 1800 / LTE 850 / LTE 900 / LTE 1800 / LTE 2100 / TD-LTE 2300	
404	50	Reliance	North East	Operational	LTE	Data-only as of 2020
404	51	BSNL Mobile	Himachal Pradesh	Operational	GSM 900 / UMTS 2100 / LTE 2100	Former CellOne
404	52	Reliance	Odisha	Operational	LTE	Data-only as of 2020
404	53	BSNL Mobile	Punjab	Operational	GSM 900 / UMTS 2100 / LTE 2100	Former CellOne
404	54	BSNL Mobile	Uttar Pradesh (West)	Operational	GSM 900 / UMTS 2100 / LTE 2100	Former CellOne
404	55	BSNL Mobile	Uttar Pradesh (East)	Operational	GSM 900 / UMTS 2100 / LTE 2100	Former CellOne
404	56	Vi India	Uttar Pradesh (West)	Operational	GSM 900 / LTE 900 / LTE 1800 / LTE 2100 / TD-LTE 2500	Former IDEA
404	57	BSNL Mobile	Gujarat	Operational	GSM 900 / UMTS 2100 / LTE 2100	Former CellOne
404	58	BSNL Mobile	Madhya Pradesh & Chhattisgarh	Operational	GSM 900 / UMTS 2100 / LTE 2100	Former CellOne
404	59	BSNL Mobile	Rajasthan	Operational	CDMA 850 / GSM 900 / UMTS 2100	Former CellOne
404	60	Vi India	Rajasthan	Operational	GSM 900 / UMTS 2100 / LTE 900 / LTE 1800 / LTE 2100 / TD-LTE 2500	Former Vodafone India
404	62	BSNL Mobile	Jammu & Kashmir	Operational	GSM 900 / UMTS 2100 / LTE 2100	Former CellOne
404	64	BSNL Mobile	Chennai	Operational	GSM 900 / GSM 1800 / UMTS 2100 / LTE 2100	Former CellOne
404	66	BSNL Mobile	Maharashtra & Goa	Operational	GSM 900 / UMTS 2100 / LTE 2100	Former CellOne
404	67	Reliance	Madhya Pradesh & Chhattisgarh	Not Operational	LTE	Data-only as of 2020
404	68	MTNL	Delhi & NCR	Operational	GSM 900 / UMTS 2100 / LTE 1800	To be merged with BSNL
404	69	MTNL	Mumbai	Operational	GSM 900 / UMTS 2100	To be merged with BSNL
404	70	AirTel	Rajasthan	Operational	GSM 900 / GSM 1800 / LTE 900 / LTE 1800 / LTE 2100 / TD-LTE 2300	
404	71	BSNL Mobile	Karnataka (Bangalore)	Operational	GSM 900 / UMTS 2100 / LTE 2100	Former CellOne
404	72	BSNL Mobile	Kerala	Operational	GSM 900 / GSM 1800 / UMTS 2100 / LTE 2100	Former CellOne
404	73	BSNL Mobile	Andhra Pradesh and Telangana	Operational	GSM 900 / UMTS 2100 / LTE 2100	Former CellOne
404	74	BSNL Mobile	West Bengal	Operational	GSM 900 / UMTS 2100 / LTE 2100	Former CellOne
404	75	BSNL Mobile	Bihar	Operational	GSM 900 / UMTS 2100 / LTE 2100	Former CellOne
404	76	BSNL Mobile	Odisha	Operational	GSM 900 / GSM 1800 / UMTS 2100 / LTE 2100	Former CellOne
404	77	BSNL Mobile	North East	Operational	GSM 900 / UMTS 2100 / LTE 2100	Former CellOne
404	78	Vi India	Madhya Pradesh & Chattishgarh	Operational	GSM 900 / UMTS 2100 / LTE 900 / LTE 1800 / LTE 2100 / TD-LTE 2300 / TD-LTE 2500	Former IDEA
404	79	BSNL Mobile	Andaman Nicobar	Operational	GSM 900 / UMTS 2100	Former CellOne
404	80	BSNL Mobile	Tamil Nadu	Operational	GSM 900 / GSM 1800 / UMTS 2100 / LTE 2100	Former CellOne
404	81	BSNL Mobile	Kolkata	Operational	GSM 900 / UMTS 2100 / LTE 2100	Former CellOne
404	82	Idea	Vodafone Idea Limited	Operational	GSM 1800 / UMTS 2100 / LTE 1800 / LTE 2100 / TD-LTE 2500	Former IDEA
404	83	Reliance	Kolkata	Operational	LTE	Data-only as of 2020
404	84	Vi India	Chennai	Not Operational	GSM 1800 / UMTS 2100 / LTE 1800 / LTE 2100	Former Vodafone India
404	85	Reliance	West Bengal	Operational	LTE	Data-only as of 2020
404	86	Vi India	Karnataka	Operational	GSM 900 / LTE 900 / LTE 1800 / LTE 2100	Former Vodafone India
404	87	Idea	Vodafone Idea Limited	Not Operational	GSM 900 / GSM 1800 / UMTS 2100 / LTE 900 / LTE 1800 / LTE 2100 / TD-LTE 2500	Former IDEA
404	88	Vi India	Punjab	Not Operational	GSM 900 / UMTS 2100 / LTE 900 / LTE 1800 / LTE 2100 / TD-LTE 2500	Former Vodafone India
404	89	Idea	Vodafone Idea Limited	Not Operational	GSM 900 / UMTS 2100 / LTE 900 / LTE 1800 / LTE 2100 / TD-LTE 2500	Former IDEA
404	90	AirTel (Maharashtra)	Bharti Airtel Limited	Operational	GSM 1800 / LTE 850 / LTE 1800 / LTE 2100 / TD-LTE 2300	
404	91	AIRCEL	Kolkata	Not operational	GSM 900	Bankrupt in 2018
404	92	AirTel (Mumbai)	Bharti Airtel Limited	Operational	GSM 900 / GSM 1800 / LTE 850 / LTE 900 / LTE 1800 / LTE 2100 / TD-LTE 2300	
404	93	AirTel (Madhya Pradesh)	Bharti Airtel Limited	Operational	GSM 1800 / LTE 1800 / LTE 2100 / TD-LTE 2300	
404	94	AirTel (Tamil Nadu)	Bharti Airtel Limited	Operational	GSM 1800 / LTE 1800 / LTE 2100 / TD-LTE 2300	
404	95	AirTel (Kerala)	Bharti Airtel Limited	Operational	GSM 1800 / LTE 1800 / LTE 2100 / TD-LTE 2300	
404	96	AirTel (Haryana)	Bharti Airtel Limited	Operational	GSM 1800 / LTE 850 / LTE 1800 / LTE 2100 / TD-LTE 2300	
404	97	AirTel (UP-West)	Bharti Airtel Limited	Operational	GSM 1800 / LTE 1800 / LTE 2100 / TD-LTE 2300	
404	98	AirTel (Gujarat)	Bharti Airtel Limited	Operational	GSM 1800 / LTE 1800 / LTE 2100 / TD-LTE 2300	
=== India - IN - 405 === 405	01	Reliance	Andhra Pradesh	Not operational	CDMA 850	
405	03	Reliance	Bihar	Operational	LTE	Data-only as of 2020
405	04	Reliance	Chennai	Operational	LTE	Data-only as of 2020
405	05	Reliance	Delhi & NCR	Operational	LTE	Data-only as of 2020
405	06	Reliance	Gujarat	Operational	LTE	Data-only as of 2020
405	07	Reliance	Haryana	Operational	LTE	Data-only as of 2020
405	08	Reliance	Himachal Pradesh	Operational	LTE	Data-only as of 2020
405	09	Reliance	Jammu & Kashmir	Operational	LTE	Data-only as of 2020
405	10	Reliance	Karnataka	Operational	LTE	Data-only as of 2020
405	11	Reliance	Kerala	Operational	LTE	Data-only as of 2020
405	12	Reliance	Kolkata	Operational	LTE	Data-only as of 2020
405	13	Reliance	Maharashtra & Goa	Operational	LTE	Data-only as of 2020
405	14	Reliance	Madhya Pradesh	Operational	LTE	Data-only as of 2020
405	15	Reliance	Mumbai	Operational	LTE	Data-only as of 2020
405	17	Reliance	Odisha	Operational	LTE	Data-only as of 2020
405	18	Reliance	Punjab	Operational	LTE	Data-only as of 2020
405	19	Reliance	Rajasthan	Operational	LTE	Data-only as of 2020
405	20	Reliance	Tamil Nadu	Operational	LTE	Data-only as of 2020
405	21	Reliance	Uttar Pradesh (East)	Operational	LTE	Data-only as of 2020
405	22	Reliance	Uttar Pradesh (West)	Operational	LTE	Data-only as of 2020
405	23	Reliance	West Bengal	Operational	LTE	Data-only as of 2020
405	024	HFCL INFOT (Ping Mobile Brand)	Punjab	Not operational	CDMA 850	Merged with Airtel in 2019
405	025	TATA DOCOMO	Andhra Pradesh and Telangana	Not operational	CDMA 850 / GSM 1800 / UMTS 2100	Merged with Airtel in 2019
405	026	TATA DOCOMO	Assam	Not operational	CDMA 850	Merged with Airtel in 2019
405	027	TATA DOCOMO	Bihar/Jharkhand	Not operational	CDMA 850 / GSM 1800	Merged with Airtel in 2019
405	028	TATA DOCOMO	Chennai	Not operational	CDMA 850 / GSM 1800	Merged with Airtel in 2019
405	029	TATA DOCOMO	Delhi	Not operational	CDMA 850	Merged with Airtel in 2019
405	030	TATA DOCOMO	Gujarat	Not operational	CDMA 850 / GSM 1800 / UMTS 2100	Merged with Airtel in 2019
405	031	TATA DOCOMO	Haryana	Not operational	CDMA 850 / GSM 1800 / UMTS 2100	Merged with Airtel in 2019
405	032	TATA DOCOMO	Himachal Pradesh	Not operational	CDMA 850 / GSM 1800 / UMTS 2100	Merged with Airtel in 2019
405	033	TATA DOCOMO	Jammu & Kashmir	Not operational	CDMA 850	Merged with Airtel in 2019
405	034	TATA DOCOMO	Karnataka	Not operational	CDMA 850 / GSM 1800 / UMTS 2100	Merged with Airtel in 2019
405	035	TATA DOCOMO	Kerala	Not operational	CDMA 850 / GSM 1800 / UMTS 2100	Merged with Airtel in 2019
405	036	TATA DOCOMO	Kolkata	Not operational	CDMA 850 / GSM 1800	Merged with Airtel in 2019
405	037	TATA DOCOMO	Maharashtra & Goa	Not operational	CDMA 850 / GSM 1800 / UMTS 2100	Merged with Airtel in 2019
405	038	TATA DOCOMO	Madhya Pradesh	Not operational	CDMA 850 / GSM 1800 / UMTS 2100	Merged with Airtel in 2019
405	039	TATA DOCOMO	Mumbai	Not operational	CDMA 850 / GSM 1800	Merged with Airtel in 2019
405	041	TATA DOCOMO	Odisha	Not operational	CDMA 850 / GSM 1800	Merged with Airtel in 2019
405	042	TATA DOCOMO	Punjab	Not operational	CDMA 850 / GSM 1800 / UMTS 2100	Merged with Airtel in 2019
405	043	TATA DOCOMO	Rajasthan	Not operational	CDMA 850 / GSM 1800 / UMTS 2100	Merged with Airtel in 2019
405	044	TATA DOCOMO	Tamil Nadu including Chennai	Not operational	CDMA 850 / GSM 1800	Merged with Airtel in 2019
405	045	TATA DOCOMO	Uttar Pradesh (East)	Not operational	CDMA 850 / GSM 1800	Merged with Airtel in 2019
405	046	TATA DOCOMO	Uttar Pradesh (West) & Uttarakhand	Not operational	CDMA 850 / GSM 1800 / UMTS 2100	Merged with Airtel in 2019
405	047	TATA DOCOMO	West Bengal	Not operational	CDMA 850 / GSM 1800	Merged with Airtel in 2019
405	048	INDIAN RAILWAYS GSM-R	All Circle	Operational	GSM-R 900	Indian Railways GSM-R Network
405	51	AirTel (West Bengal)	Bharti Airtel Limited	Operational	GSM 900 / GSM 1800 / LTE 900 / LTE 1800 / LTE 2100 / TD-LTE 2300	
405	52	AirTel (Bihar)	Bharti Airtel Limited	Operational	GSM 900 / GSM 1800 / LTE 900 / LTE 1800 / LTE 2100 / TD-LTE 2300	
405	53	AirTel (Orissa)	Bharti Airtel Limited	Operational	GSM 900 / GSM 1800 / LTE 1800 / LTE 2100 / TD-LTE 2300	
405	54	AirTel (UP East)	Bharti Airtel Limited	Operational	GSM 900 / GSM 1800 / LTE 1800 / LTE 2100 / TD-LTE 2300	
405	55	Airtel (Jammu & Kasmir)	Bharti Airtel Limited	Operational	GSM 900 / GSM 1800 / LTE 1800 / LTE 2100 / TD-LTE 2300	
405	56	AirTel (Assam)	Bharti Airtel Limited	Operational	GSM 900 / GSM 1800 / LTE 900 / LTE 1800 / LTE 2100 / TD-LTE 2300	
405	66	Vi India	Uttar Pradesh (West)	Not Operational	GSM 900 / GSM 1800 / UMTS 2100 / LTE 900 / LTE 1800 / LTE 2100 / TD-LTE 2500	Former Vodafone India
405	67	Vi India	West Bengal	Operational	GSM 900 / UMTS 2100 / LTE 900 / LTE 1800 / LTE 2100 / TD-LTE 2500	Former Vodafone India
405	70	Idea	Vodafone Idea Limited	Operational	GSM 1800 / UMTS 2100 / LTE 1800 / LTE 2100 / TD-LTE 2500	Former IDEA
405	81	AIRCELL	Delhi	UNKNOWN	UNKNOWN	
405	82	AIRCELL	Andhra Pradesh	UNKNOWN	UNKNOWN	
405	83	AIRCELL	Gujarat	UNKNOWN	UNKNOWN	
405	750	Vi India	Jammu & Kashmir	Operational	GSM 1800 / UMTS 2100 / LTE 1800 / LTE 2100 / TD-LTE 2500	Former Vodafone India
405	751	Vi India	Assam	Operational	GSM 1800 / UMTS 2100 / LTE 1800 / LTE 2100 / TD-LTE 2500	Former Vodafone India
405	752	Vi India	Bihar & Jharkhand	Not Operational	GSM 1800 / UMTS 2100 / LTE 1800 / LTE 2100 / TD-LTE 2500	Former Vodafone India
405	753	Vi India	Odisha	Operational	GSM 900 / UMTS 2100 / LTE 900 / LTE 1800 / LTE 2100 / TD-LTE 2500	Former Vodafone India
405	754	Vi India	Himachal Pradesh	Not Operational	GSM 1800 / UMTS 2100 / LTE 1800 / LTE 2100 / TD-LTE 2500	Former Vodafone India
405	755	Vi India	North East	Operational	GSM 1800 / UMTS 2100 / LTE 1800 / LTE 2100 / TD-LTE 2500	Former Vodafone India
405	756	Vi India	Madhya Pradesh & Chhattisgarh	Not Operational	GSM 1800 / UMTS 2100 / LTE 900 / LTE 1800 / LTE 2100 / TD-LTE 2300 / TD-LTE 2500	Former Vodafone India
405	799	Vi India	Mumbai	Not Operational	GSM 900 / GSM 1800 / UMTS 2100 / LTE 900 / LTE 1800 / LTE 2100 / TD-LTE 2500 / 5G 3500	Former IDEA
405	800	AIRCEL	Delhi & NCR	Not operational	GSM 1800	Bankrupt in 2018
405	801	AIRCEL	Andhra Pradesh and Telangana	Not operational	GSM 1800	Bankrupt in 2018
405	802	AIRCEL	Gujarat	Not operational	GSM 1800	Bankrupt in 2018
405	803	AIRCEL	Karnataka	Not operational	GSM 1800	Bankrupt in 2018
405	804	AIRCEL	Maharashtra & Goa	Not operational	GSM 1800	Bankrupt in 2018
405	805	AIRCEL	Mumbai	Not operational	GSM 1800	Bankrupt in 2018
405	806	AIRCEL	Rajasthan	Not operational	GSM 1800	Bankrupt in 2018
405	807	AIRCEL	Haryana	Not operational	GSM 1800	Bankrupt in 2018
405	808	AIRCEL	Madhya Pradesh	Not operational	GSM 1800	Bankrupt in 2018
405	809	AIRCEL	Kerala	Not operational	GSM 1800	Bankrupt in 2018
405	810	AIRCEL	Uttar Pradesh (East)	Not operational	GSM 1800	Bankrupt in 2018
405	811	AIRCEL	Uttar Pradesh (West)	Not operational	GSM	Bankrupt in 2018
405	812	AIRCEL	Punjab	Not operational	GSM	License cancelled by Supreme Court
405	813	Uninor	Haryana	Not operational	GSM	License cancelled by Supreme Court
405	814	Uninor	Himachal Pradesh	Not operational	GSM	License cancelled by Supreme Court
405	815	Uninor	Jammu & Kashmir	Not operational	GSM	License cancelled by Supreme Court
405	816	Uninor	Punjab	Not operational	GSM	License cancelled by Supreme Court
405	817	Uninor	Rajasthan	Not operational	GSM	License cancelled by Supreme Court
405	818	Uninor	Uttar Pradesh (West)	Not operational	GSM 1800 / UMTS 2100 /LTE 1800 / LTE 2100	Merged with Airtel in 2018
405	819	Uninor	Andhra Pradesh and Telangana	Not operational	GSM 1800	Merged with Airtel in 2018
405	820	Uninor	Karnataka	Not operational	GSM 1800	Shut down in 2012
405	821	Uninor	Kerala	Not operational	GSM 1800	Shut down in 2012
405	822	Uninor	Kolkata	Not operational	GSM 1800	Shut down in 2013
405	824	Videocon Telecom	Assam	Not operational	GSM 1800	License cancelled by Supreme Court
405	825	Videocon Telecom	Bihar	Not operational	GSM 1800	Shut down in 2016
405	826	Videocon Telecom	Delhi	Not operational	GSM 1800	License cancelled by Supreme Court
405	827	Videocon Telecom	Gujarat	Not operational	GSM 1800	Shut down in 2016
405	828	Videocon Telecom	Haryana	Not operational	GSM 1800	Shut down in 2016
405	829	Videocon Telecom	Himachal Pradesh	Not operational	GSM 1800	License cancelled by Supreme Court
405	831	Videocon Telecom	Jammu & Kashmir	Not operational	GSM 1800	License cancelled by Supreme Court
405	832	Videocon Telecom	Karnataka	Not operational	GSM 1800	License cancelled by Supreme Court
405	833	Videocon Telecom	Kerala	Not operational	GSM 1800	License cancelled by Supreme Court
405	834	Videocon Telecom	Madhya Pradesh	Not operational	GSM 1800	Shut down in 2016
405	835	Videocon Telecom	Maharashtra	Not operational	GSM 1800	License cancelled by Supreme Court
405	836	Videocon Telecom	Mumbai	Not operational	GSM 1800	License cancelled by Supreme Court
405	837	Videocon Telecom	North East	Not operational	GSM 1800	License cancelled by Supreme Court
405	838	Videocon Telecom	Orissa	Not operational	GSM 1800	License cancelled by Supreme Court
405	839	Videocon Telecom	Rajasthan	Not operational	GSM 1800	License cancelled by Supreme Court
405	840	Jio Bengal	Reliance Jio Infocomm Limited	Operational	LTE 850 / LTE 1800 / TD-LTE 2300	
405	841	Videocon Telecom	Uttar Pradesh (East)	Not operational	GSM 1800	Shut down in 2016
405	842	Videocon Telecom	Uttar Pradesh (West)	Not operational	GSM 1800	Shut down in 2016
405	843	Videocon Telecom	West Bengal	Not operational	GSM 1800	License cancelled by Supreme Court
405	844	Uninor	Delhi & NCR	Not operational	GSM 1800	Merged with Airtel in 2018
405	845	Idea	Vodafone Idea Limited	Not Operational	GSM 1800 / UMTS 2100 / LTE 1800 / LTE 2100 / TD-LTE 2500	Former IDEA
405	846	Idea	Vodafone Idea Limited	Not Operational	GSM 1800 / UMTS 2100 / LTE 1800 / LTE 2100 / TD-LTE 2500	Former IDEA
405	847	Vi India	Karnataka	Not operational	GSM 900 / GSM 1800 / UMTS 2100 / LTE 900 / LTE 1800 / LTE 2100	Former IDEA
405	848	Idea	Vodafone Idea Limited	Not Operational	GSM 900 / GSM 1800 / UMTS 2100 / LTE 900 / LTE 1800 / LTE 2100 / TD-LTE 2500	Former IDEA
405	849	Idea	Vodafone Idea Limited	Not Operational	GSM 1800 / UMTS 2100 / LTE 1800 / LTE 2100 / TD-LTE 2500	Former IDEA
405	850	Idea	Vodafone Idea Limited	Not Operational	GSM 900 / GSM 1800 / UMTS 2100 / LTE 900 / LTE 1800 / LTE 2100 / TD-LTE 2500	Former IDEA
405	851	Vi India	Punjab	Not Operational	GSM 900 / GSM 1800 / UMTS 2100 / LTE 900 / LTE 1800 / LTE 2100 / TD-LTE 2500	Former IDEA
405	852	Idea	Vodafone Idea Limited	Not Operational	GSM 1800 / UMTS 2100 / LTE 1800 / LTE 2100	Former IDEA
405	853	Idea	Vodafone Idea Limited	Not Operational	GSM 900 / GSM 1800 / UMTS 2100 / LTE 900 / LTE 1800 / LTE 2100 / TD-LTE 2500	Former IDEA
405	854	Jio Andhra Pradesh	Reliance Jio Infocomm Limited	Operational	LTE 1800 / TD-LTE 2300	
405	855	Jio Assam	Reliance Jio Infocomm Limited	Operational	LTE 850 / LTE 1800 / TD-LTE 2300	
405	856	Jio Bihar	Reliance Jio Infocomm Limited	Operational	LTE 850 / LTE 1800 / TD-LTE 2300	
405	857	Jio Gujarat	Reliance Jio Infocomm Limited	Operational	LTE 850 / LTE 1800 / TD-LTE 2300	
405	858	Jio Haryana	Reliance Jio Infocomm Limited	Operational	LTE 850 / LTE 1800 / TD-LTE 2300	
405	859	Jio Pradesh	Reliance Jio Infocomm Limited	Operational	LTE 850 / LTE 1800 / TD-LTE 2300	
405	860	Jio Mumbai	Reliance Jio Infocomm Limited	Operational	LTE 850 / LTE 1800 / TD-LTE 2300	
405	861	Jio Karnataka	Reliance Jio Infocomm Limited	Operational	LTE 850 / LTE 1800 / TD-LTE 2300	
405	862	Jio Kerala	Reliance Jio Infocomm Limited	Operational	LTE 850 / LTE 1800 / TD-LTE 2300	
405	863	Jio Madhya Pradesh	Reliance Jio Infocomm Limited	Operational	LTE 850 / LTE 1800 / TD-LTE 2300	
405	864	Jio Maharashtra	Reliance Jio Infocomm Limited	Operational	LTE 1800 / TD-LTE 2300	
405	865	Jio North East	Reliance Jio Infocomm Limited	Operational	LTE 850 / LTE 1800 / TD-LTE 2300	
405	866	Jio Orissa	Reliance Jio Infocomm Limited	Operational	LTE 850 / LTE 1800 / TD-LTE 2300	
405	867	Jio Punjab	Reliance Jio Infocomm Limited	Operational	LTE 850 / LTE 1800 / TD-LTE 2300	
405	868	Jio Rajasthan	Reliance Jio Infocomm Limited	Operational	LTE 850 / LTE 1800 / TD-LTE 2300	
405	869	Jio Tamil Nadu	Reliance Jio Infocomm Limited	Operational	LTE 850 / LTE 1800 / TD-LTE 2300	
405	870	Jio Uttar Pradesh (West)	Reliance Jio Infocomm Limited	Operational	LTE 850 / LTE 1800 / TD-LTE 2300	
405	871	Jio Uttar Pradesh (East)	Reliance Jio Infocomm Limited	Operational	LTE 850 / LTE 1800 / TD-LTE 2300	
405	872	Jio Delhi	Reliance Jio Infocomm Limited	Operational	LTE 850 / LTE 1800 / TD-LTE 2300	
405	873	Jio Kolkata	Reliance Jio Infocomm Limited	Operational	LTE 850 / LTE 1800 / TD-LTE 2300	
405	874	Jio Mumbai	Reliance Jio Infocomm Limited	Operational	LTE 850 / LTE 1800 / TD-LTE 2300	
405	875	Uninor	Assam	Not operational	GSM 1800	Merged with Airtel in 2018
405	876	Uninor	Bihar	Not operational	GSM 1800	Merged with Airtel in 2018
405	877	Uninor	North East	Not operational	GSM 1800	License cancelled by Supreme Court
405	878	Uninor	Orissa	Not operational	GSM 1800	Shut down from July 2013
405	879	Uninor	Uttar Pradesh (East)	Not operational	GSM 1800	Merged with Airtel in 2018
405	880	Uninor	West Bengal	Not operational	GSM 1800	Shut down from July 2013
405	881	S Tel	Assam	Not operational	GSM 1800	License cancelled in 2012
405	882	S Tel	Bihar	Not operational	GSM 1800	License cancelled in 2012
405	883	S Tel	Himachal Pradesh	Not operational	GSM 1800	License cancelled in 2012
405	884	S Tel	Jammu & Kashmir	Not operational	GSM 1800	License cancelled in 2012
405	885	S Tel	North East	Not operational	GSM 1800	License cancelled in 2012
405	886	S Tel	Orissa	Not operational	GSM 1800	License cancelled in 2012
405	887	SISTEMA SHYAM	Andhra Pradesh	Not operational	CDMA 850	Merged with Rcom in 2017
405	888	SISTEMA SHYAM	Assam	Not operational	CDMA 850	Merged with Rcom in 2017
405	889	SISTEMA SHYAM	Bihar	Not operational	CDMA 850	Merged with Rcom in 2017
405	890	SISTEMA SHYAM	Delhi	Not operational	CDMA 850	Merged with Rcom in 2017
405	891	SISTEMA SHYAM	Gujarat	Not operational	CDMA 850	Merged with Rcom in 2017
405	892	SISTEMA SHYAM	Haryana	Not operational	CDMA 850	Merged with Rcom in 2017
405	893	SISTEMA SHYAM	Himachal Pradesh	Not operational	CDMA 850	Merged with Rcom in 2017
405	894	SISTEMA SHYAM	Jammu & Kashmir	Not operational	CDMA 850	Merged with Rcom in 2017
405	895	SISTEMA SHYAM	Karnataka	Not operational	CDMA 850	Merged with Rcom in 2017
405	896	SISTEMA SHYAM	Kerala	Not operational	CDMA 850	Merged with Rcom in 2017
405	897	SISTEMA SHYAM	Kolkata	Not operational	CDMA 850	Merged with Rcom in 2017
405	898	SISTEMA SHYAM	Madhya Pradesh	Not operational	CDMA 850	Merged with Rcom in 2017
405	899	SISTEMA SHYAM	Maharashtra	Not operational	CDMA 850	Merged with Rcom in 2017
405	900	SISTEMA SHYAM	Mumbai	Not operational	CDMA 850	Merged with Rcom in 2017
405	901	SISTEMA SHYAM	North East	Not operational	CDMA 850	Merged with Rcom in 2017
405	902	SISTEMA SHYAM	Orissa	Not operational	CDMA 850	Merged with Rcom in 2017
405	903	SISTEMA SHYAM	Punjab	Not operational	CDMA 850	Merged with Rcom in 2017
405	904	SISTEMA SHYAM	Tamilnadu	Not operational	CDMA 850	Merged with Rcom in 2017
405	905	SISTEMA SHYAM	Uttar Pradesh (East)	Not operational	CDMA 850	Merged with Rcom in 2017
405	906	SISTEMA SHYAM	Uttar Pradesh (West)	Not operational	CDMA 850	Merged with Rcom in 2017
405	907	SISTEMA SHYAM	West Bengal	Not operational	CDMA 850	Merged with Rcom in 2017
405	908	Vi India	Andhra Pradesh and Telangana	Not Operational	GSM 900 / LTE 900 / LTE 1800 / LTE 2100 / TD-LTE 2500	Former IDEA
405	909	Vi India	Delhi	Not Operational	GSM 900 / GSM 1800 / UMTS 2100 / LTE 900 / LTE 1800 / LTE 2100 / TD-LTE 2500	Former IDEA
405	910	Vi India	Haryana	Not Operational	GSM 1800 / UMTS 2100 / LTE 1800 / LTE 2100 / TD-LTE 2500	Former IDEA
405	911	Vi India	Maharashtra	Not Operational	GSM 900 / UMTS 2100 / LTE 900 / LTE 1800 / LTE 2100 / TD-LTE 2300 / TD-LTE 2500	Former SPICE IDEA
405	912	Etisalat DB (cheers)	Andhra Pradesh and Telangana	Not operational	GSM 1800	License cancelled in 2012
405	913	Etisalat DB (cheers)	Delhi & NCR	Not operational	GSM 1800	License cancelled in 2012
405	914	Etisalat DB (cheers)	Gujarat	Not operational	GSM 1800	License cancelled in 2012
405	915	Etisalat DB (cheers)	Haryana	Not operational	GSM 1800	License cancelled in 2012
405	916	Etisalat DB (cheers)	Karnataka	Not operational	GSM 1800	License cancelled in 2012
405	917	Etisalat DB (cheers)	Kerala	Not operational	GSM 1800	License cancelled in 2012
405	918	Etisalat DB (cheers)	Maharashtra	Not operational	GSM 1800	License cancelled in 2012
405	919	Etisalat DB (cheers)	Mumbai	Not operational	GSM 1800	License cancelled in 2012
405	920	Etisalat DB (cheers)	Punjab	Not operational	GSM 1800	License cancelled in 2012
405	921	Etisalat DB (cheers)	Rajasthan	Not operational	GSM 1800	License cancelled in 2012
405	922	Etisalat DB (cheers)	Tamilnadu	Not operational	GSM 1800	License cancelled in 2012
405	923	Etisalat DB (cheers)	Uttar Pradesh (East)	Not operational	GSM 1800	License cancelled in 2012
405	924	Etisalat DB (cheers)	Uttar Pradesh (West)	Not operational	GSM 1800	License cancelled in 2012
405	925	Uninor	Tamilnadu	Not operational	GSM 1800	Shut down from July 2012
405	926	Uninor	Mumbai	Not operational	GSM 1800	Shut down from July 2013
405	927	Uninor	Gujarat	Not operational	GSM 1800	Merged with Airtel in 2018
405	928	Uninor	Madhya Pradesh	Not operational	GSM 1800	License cancelled in 2012
405	929	Uninor	Maharashtra	Not operational	GSM 1800	Merged with Airtel in 2018
405	930	Etisalat DB (cheers)	Bihar	Not operational	GSM 1800	License cancelled in 2012
405	931	Etisalat DB (cheers)	Madhya Pradesh	Not operational	GSM 1800	License cancelled in 2012
405	932	VIDEOCON (HFCL)-GSM	Punjab	Not operational	GSM 1800	Shut down in 2016

==== Iran – IR ====
MCC	MNC	Brand	Operator	Status	Bands (MHz)	References and notes
432	01		Kish Cell Pars	Operational	MVNO	
432	02	ApTel, AzarTel	Negin Ertebatat Ava	Operational	MVNO	
432	03		Parsian Hamrah Lotus	Operational	MVNO	
432	04		TOSE E FANAVARI ERTEBATAT NOVIN HAMRAH	Unknown	Unknown	
432	05	Smart Comm	Hamrah Hooshmand Ayandeh	Unknown	MVNO	
432	06	Arian-Tel	Ertebatat-e Arian Tel Co.	Operational	MVNO	
432	07		Hooshmand Amin Mobile	Operational	MVNO	
432	08	Shatel Mobile	Shatel Group	Operational	MVNO	
432	09	HiWEB	Dadeh Dostar asr Novin PJSC	Unknown	Unknown	
432	10	Samantel	Samantel Mobile	Operational	MVNO	
432	11	IR-TCI (Hamrah-e-Avval)	Mobile Communications Company of Iran (MCI)	Operational	GSM 900 / GSM 1800 / UMTS 900 / UMTS 2100 / LTE 900 / LTE 1800 / LTE 2100 / LTE 2600 / TD-LTE 2300 / 5G 3500	
432	12	Avacell (HiWEB)	Dadeh Dostar asr Novin PJSC	Operational	LTE 800 / TD-LTE 2600	Mostly in rural and remote areas
432	13	HiWEB	Dadeh Dostar asr Novin PJSC	Unknown	Unknown	
432	14	TKC/KFZO	Kish Free Zone Organization	Operational	GSM 900 / GSM 1800	
432	19	Espadan	Mobile Telecommunications Company of Esfahan	Not operational	GSM 900	MNC withdrawn
432	20	RighTel	Social Security Investment Co.	Operational	UMTS 900 / UMTS 2100 / LTE 1800 / LTE 2100	
432	32	Taliya	Telecommunication Company of Iran (TCI)	Operational	GSM 900 / GSM 1800	Roaming TKC & TCI
432	35	MTN Irancell	MTN Irancell Telecommunications Services Company	Operational	GSM 900 / GSM 1800 / UMTS 900 / UMTS 2100 / LTE 900 / LTE 1800 / LTE 2100 / LTE 2600 / TD-LTE 3500 / TD-LTE 2300 / 5G 3500	
432	44	Mobinnet	Ertebatat Mobinnet	Operational	TD-LTE 3500	
432	45	Zi-Tel	Farabord Dadeh Haye Iranian Co.	Operational	TD-LTE 3500	
432	46	HiWEB	Dadeh Dostar asr Novin PJSC	Operational	TD-LTE 2600	
432	49		Gostaresh Ertebatat Mabna	Unknown	MVNO	
432	50	Shatel Mobile	Shatel Group	Operational	TD-LTE 2600 MHz	
432	51		Pishgaman Tose'e Ertebatat	Unknown	Unknown	
432	52		Asiatech	Unknown	Unknown	
432	70	MTCE	Telecommunication Company of Iran (TCI)	Not Operational	GSM 900	Mostly in rural and remote areas (WLL)
432	71	KOOHE NOOR	ERTEBATAT KOOHE NOOR	Not Operational	GSM 900	Mostly in rural and remote areas (WLL)
432	90	Iraphone	IRAPHONE GHESHM of Iran	Operational	GSM 900 / GSM 1800	Mobile Phone
432	93	Iraphone	Iraphone	Operational	GSM 900 / GSM 1800	Mostly in rural and remote areas
432	93	Farzanegan Pars	Farzanegan Pars	Operational	GSM 900 / GSM 1800	Fixed Communication Provider (FCP)
432	99	TCI	TCI of Iran and Rightel	Operational	GSM 850 / GSM 1900	Roaming IR70 & TCI & RIGHTEL (GSM WLL)

==== Iraq – IQ ====
MCC	MNC	Brand	Operator	Status	Bands (MHz)	References and notes
418	00	Asia Cell	Asia Cell Telecommunications Company	Operational	GSM 900 / UMTS 2100	
418	05	Asia Cell	Asia Cell Telecommunications Company	Operational	GSM 900 / UMTS 2100	
418	08	SanaTel		Operational	GSM 900	
418	20	Zain	Zain Iraq	Operational	GSM 900 / GSM 1800 / UMTS 2100	Former MTC Atheer
418	30	Zain	Zain Iraq	Operational	GSM 900 / GSM 1800 / UMTS 2100	Former Orascom Telecom (Iraqna)
418	40	Korek	Telecom Ltd	Operational	GSM 900 / UMTS 2100	
418	45	Mobitel	Mobitel Co. Ltd.	Operational	UMTS	
418	62	Itisaluna	Itisaluna Wireless CO.	Operational	CDMA 800 / CDMA 1900	
418	66	Fastlink	Regional Telecom Company	Operational	LTE 2600	Kurdistan
418	92	Omnnea	Omnnea Wireless	Operational	CDMA	

==== Israel – IL ====
MCC	MNC	Brand	Operator	Status	Bands (MHz)	References and notes
425	01	Partner	Partner Communications Company Ltd.	Operational	GSM 900 / GSM 1800 / UMTS 900 / UMTS 2100 / LTE 1800 / LTE 2100 / 5G 2600 / 5G 3500	Former Orange (until 2016)
425	02	Cellcom	Cellcom Israel Ltd.	Operational	GSM 1800 / UMTS 850 / UMTS 2100 / LTE 1800 / 5G 2600 / 5G 3500	
425	03	Pelephone	Pelephone Communications Ltd.	Operational	UMTS 850 / UMTS 2100 / LTE 1800 / 5G 2600 / 5G 3500	CDMA 850 shut down July 2017
425	04		Voye Global Connectivity Ltd.	Operational	MVNO	Former Globalsim Ltd
425	05	Jawwal	Palestine Cellular Communications Ltd.	Operational	GSM 900 / UMTS 2100	Covering the Palestinian territories
425	06	Wataniya Mobile	Wataniya Palestine Ltd. (Ooredoo)	Operational	GSM 900 / GSM 1800 / UMTS 2100	Covering the Palestinian territories
425	07	Hot Mobile	Hot Mobile Ltd.	Operational	UMTS 2100 / LTE 1800 / LTE 2100 / 5G 2600 / 5G 3500	Former Mirs Communications; roams on Pelephone; iDEN shut down Dec 2019
425	08	Cellcom	Cellcom Israel Ltd.	Operational	UMTS 2100 / LTE 1800	Former Golan Telecom
425	09	We4G	Wecom Mobile Ltd.	Operational	LTE 1800	Former Marathon 018 Xphone Ltd.
425	10		Voicenter Ltd.	Unknown	Unknown	Former Orange, Partner
425	11	Merkaziya Ltd	Merkaziya Ltd.	Operational	MVNO	Former 365 Telecom
425	12		Free Telecom	Operational	MVNO	Former Widely Mobile (x2one)
425	13		Ituran Cellular Communications	Not operational	Unknown	MNC withdrawn
425	14	Pelephone	Pelephone Communications Ltd	Unknown	Unknown	Former Alon Cellular Ltd
425	15	Cellcom	Cellcom Israel Ltd	Unknown	Unknown	Former Home Cellular Ltd
425	16	Rami Levy	Rami Levy Communications Ltd.	Operational	MVNO	MVNO (Pelephone)
425	17	Sipme	Gale Phone	Not operational	MVNO	MNC withdrawn
425	18	Cellact Communications	Cellact Communications Ltd.	Operational	MVNO	MVNO (Pelephone)
425	19	019 Mobile	Telzar 019 Ltd	Operational	MVNO	Former 019 Communication Services Ltd
425	20	Bezeq	Bezeq The Israeli Telecommunication Corp Ltd.	Unknown	Unknown	
425	21		Xphone 018 Ltd.	Unknown	Unknown	Former B.I.P. Communications Ltd
425	22		Maskyoo Telephonia Ltd.	Unknown	Unknown	
425	23		Beezz Communication Solutions Ltd.	Unknown	Unknown	
425	24	012 Mobile	Partner Communications Company Ltd.	Operational	MVNO	
425	25	IMOD	Israel Ministry of Defense	Operational	LTE	
425	26	Annatel	LB Annatel Ltd.	Operational	MVNO	
425	27		Paycall Ltd	Unknown	Unknown	Former BITIT Ltd
425	28		PHI Networks	Unknown	LTE 1800 / 5G 2600 / 5G 3500	Joint venture between Partner Communications Company and Hot Mobile
425	29		C.M.G Networks	Unknown	Unknown	Former CG Networks; joint venture between Cellcom, Golan Telecom and Exphone
425	30	SIMpracy	SIMPRACY Ltd.	Unknown	MVNO	

=== J ===
==== Japan – JP ====
MCC	MNC	Brand	Operator	Status	Bands (MHz)	References and notes
440	00	Y!Mobile	SoftBank Corp.	Not operational	UMTS 1800	band 3; UMTS shut down Apr 2024
440	01		KDDI Corporation	Operational	TD-LTE 2500	band 41; WiMAX 2500 shut down 31 Mar 2020; former UQ Communications
440	02		Hanshin Cable Engineering Co., Ltd.	Unknown	WiMAX 2500	
440	03	IIJmio	Internet Initiative Japan Inc.	Operational	MVNO	
440	04		Japan Radio Company, Ltd.	Unknown	Unknown	
440	05		Wireless City Planning Inc.	Operational	TD-LTE 2500	band 41; owned by SoftBank
440	06		SAKURA Internet Inc.	Unknown	Unknown	
440	07		closip, Inc.	Unknown	MVNO	Former LTE-X
440	08		Panasonic Connect Co., Ltd.	Unknown	Unknown	
440	09		Misora Connect Inc.	Operational	MVNO	Former Marubeni Network Solutions Inc.
440	10	NTT docomo	NTT DoCoMo, Inc.	Operational	LTE 700 / LTE 850 / LTE 1500 / LTE 1800 / LTE 2100 / TD-LTE 3500 / 5G 3500 / 5G 4700 / 5G 28000	bands 1, 3, 19, 21, 28, 42; UMTS shut down Mar 2026
440	11	Rakuten Mobile	Rakuten Mobile Network, Inc.	Operational	LTE 700 / LTE 1800 / 5G 3700	
440	12		Cable media waiwai Co., Ltd.	Unknown	Unknown	
440	13		NTT DoCoMo Business, Inc.	Unknown	Unknown	
440	14		Grape One Co., Ltd.	Unknown	5G	Private 5G networks
440	15		BB Backbone Corp.	Unknown	LTE	Private LTE networks
440	16		Nokia Innovations Japan G.K.	Unknown	Unknown	
440	17		Osaka Gas Business Create Co., Ltd.	Unknown	Unknown	
440	18		Kintetsu Cable Network Co., Ltd.	Unknown	Unknown	
440	19		NEC Networks & System Integration Corporation	Unknown	Unknown	
440	20	SoftBank	SoftBank Corp.	Operational	LTE 700 / LTE 900 / LTE 1500 / LTE 1800 / LTE 2100 / TD-LTE 2500 / TD-LTE 3500 / 5G 3700 / 5G 28000	bands 1, 3, 8, 11, 28, 41, 42; UMTS shut down Apr 2024
440	21	SoftBank	SoftBank Corp.	Operational	LTE 700 / LTE 900 / LTE 1500 / LTE 1800 / LTE 2100 / TD-LTE 2500 / TD-LTE 3500 / 5G 3700 / 5G 28000	bands 1, 3, 8, 11, 28, 41, 42; UMTS shut down Apr 2024
440	22		JTOWER Inc.	Unknown	Unknown	
440	23		Fujitsu Ltd.	Unknown	Unknown	
440	24		Japan Communications Inc.	Operational	MVNO	
440	25	SoftBank	SoftBank Corp.	Unknown	Unknown	
440	26	NTT docomo	NTT DoCoMo, Inc.	Unknown	Unknown	
440	27		Rakuten Mobile, Inc.	Unknown	Unknown	
440	28		OPTAGE Inc.	Unknown	Unknown	
440	50	au	KDDI Corporation	Operational	LTE 700 / LTE 850 / LTE 1500 / LTE 1800 / LTE 2100 / TD-LTE 2500 / TD-LTE 3500 / 5G 800 / 5G 3500 / 5G 3700 / 5G 28000	bands 1, 3, 11, 18, 28, 41, 42
440	51	au	KDDI Corporation	Operational	LTE 700 / LTE 850 / LTE 1500 / LTE 1800 / LTE 2100 / TD-LTE 2500 / TD-LTE 3500 / 5G 800 / 5G 3500 / 5G 3700 / 5G 28000	bands 1, 3, 11, 18, 28, 41, 42
440	52	au	KDDI Corporation	Operational	LTE 700 / LTE 850 / LTE 1500 / LTE 1800 / LTE 2100 / TD-LTE 2500 / TD-LTE 3500 / 5G 800 / 5G 3500 / 5G 3700 / 5G 28000	bands 1, 3, 11, 18, 28, 41, 42
440	53	au	KDDI Corporation	Operational	LTE 700 / LTE 850 / LTE 1500 / LTE 1800 / LTE 2100 / TD-LTE 2500 / TD-LTE 3500 / 5G 800 / 5G 3500 / 5G 3700 / 5G 28000	bands 1, 3, 11, 18, 28, 41, 42
440	54	au	KDDI Corporation	Operational	5G NR 3500	CDMA shut down 31 Mar 2022
440	55	au	KDDI Corporation	Operational	LTE 2100	Used for Direct to Cell on Band 1
440	70	au	KDDI Corporation	Not operational	CDMA 850 / CDMA 2000	CDMA shut down 31 Mar 2022, MNC withdrawn
440	71	au	KDDI Corporation	Not operational	CDMA 850 / CDMA 2000	CDMA shut down 31 Mar 2022, MNC withdrawn
440	72	au	KDDI Corporation	Not operational	CDMA 850 / CDMA 2000	CDMA shut down 31 Mar 2022, MNC withdrawn
440	73	au	KDDI Corporation	Not operational	CDMA 850 / CDMA 2000	CDMA shut down 31 Mar 2022, MNC withdrawn
440	74	au	KDDI Corporation	Not operational	CDMA 850 / CDMA 2000	CDMA shut down 31 Mar 2022, MNC withdrawn
440	75	au	KDDI Corporation	Not operational	CDMA 850 / CDMA 2000	CDMA shut down 31 Mar 2022, MNC withdrawn
440	76	au	KDDI Corporation	Not operational	CDMA 850 / CDMA 2000	CDMA shut down 31 Mar 2022, MNC withdrawn
440	78	au	Okinawa Cellular Telephone	Not operational	CDMA 850 / CDMA 2000	CDMA shut down 31 Mar 2022; MNC withdrawn
440	91	NTT docomo	NTT DoCoMo, Inc.	Unknown	Unknown	
440	92		KDDI Corporation	Unknown	Unknown	
440	93	SoftBank	SoftBank Corp.	Unknown	Unknown	
440	94	Rakuten Mobile	Rakuten Mobile Network, Inc.	Unknown	Unknown	
=== Japan - JP - 441 === 441	00		Wireless City Planning Inc.	Operational	TD-LTE 2500	band 41; owned by SoftBank
441	01	SoftBank	SoftBank Corp.	Not operational	UMTS 900 / UMTS 2100 / LTE 700 / LTE 900 / LTE 1500 / LTE 1800 / LTE 2100 / TD-LTE 2500 / TD-LTE 3500 / 5G 3700	MNC withdrawn
441	10	UQ WiMAX	UQ Communications Inc.	Not operational	TD-LTE 2500	band 41; WiMAX 2500 shut down 31 Mar 2020; MNC withdrawn
441	200		Soracom Inc.	Operational	MVNO	IoT
441	201		Aurens Co., Ltd.	Unknown	Unknown	
441	202		Sony Wireless Communications Inc.	Unknown	Unknown	
441	203		Gujo City	Unknown	Unknown	
441	204		Wicom Inc.	Unknown	Unknown	
441	205		Katch Network Inc.	Operational	5G 4700	
441	206		Mitsubishi Electric Corp.	Unknown	Unknown	
441	207		Mitsui Knowledge Industry Co., Ltd.	Unknown	Unknown	
441	208		Chudenko Corp.	Unknown	Unknown	
441	209		Cable Television Toyama Inc.	Unknown	Unknown	
441	210		NTT East Corp.	Unknown	Unknown	
441	211		Starcat Cable Network Co., Ltd.	Unknown	Unknown	
441	212		I-TEC Solutions Co., Ltd.	Unknown	Unknown	
441	213		Hokkaido Telecommunication Network Co., Inc.	Unknown	Unknown	
441	214		Vroove Inc.	Not operational	Unknown	MNC withdrawn
441	215		KYOCERA Mirai Envision Co., Ltd.	Not operational	Unknown	MNC withdrawn
441	216		Eureka Wireless K.K.	Unknown	Unknown	
441	217	NTT docomo	NTT DoCoMo, Inc.	Unknown	Unknown	
441	218		KDDI Corporation	Unknown	Unknown	
441	219	NTT docomo	NTT DoCoMo, Inc.	Unknown	Unknown	
441	220	SoftBank	SoftBank Corp.	Unknown	Unknown	
441	91		Tokyo Organising Committee of the Olympic and Paralympic Games	Not operational	Unknown	MNC withdrawn

==== Jordan – JO ====
MCC	MNC	Brand	Operator	Status	Bands (MHz)	References and notes
416	01	zain JO	Jordan Mobile Telephone Services	Operational	GSM 900 / UMTS 2100 / LTE 1800	Former Fastlink
416	02	XPress Telecom	XPress Telecom	Not operational	iDEN 800	Shut down in 2010
416	03	Umniah	Umniah Mobile Company	Operational	UMTS 2100 / LTE 1800 / LTE 3500	GSM shut down 2022
416	77	Orange	Petra Jordanian Mobile Telecommunications Company (MobileCom)	Operational	GSM 900 / UMTS 2100 / LTE 1800 / LTE 2600 / 5G	

=== K ===
==== Kazakhstan – KZ ====
MCC	MNC	Brand	Operator	Status	Bands (MHz)	References and notes
401	01	Beeline	KaR-Tel LLP	Operational	GSM 900 / GSM 1800 / UMTS 2100 / LTE 800 / LTE 1800 / LTE 2100	
401	02	Kcell	Kcell JSC	Operational	GSM 900 / GSM 1800 / UMTS 2100 / LTE 800 / LTE 1800 / 5G 3500	
401	04	Beeline	KaR-Tel LLP	Unknown	Unknown	
401	07	Altel	Altel	Operational	UMTS 850 / GSM 1800 / LTE 1800	CDMA 800 closed 1 July 2015; acquired by Tele2
401	08	Kazakhtelecom		Operational	CDMA 450 / CDMA 800	
401	10		Freedom Telecom Operations LLP	Unknown	5G	
401	77	Tele2.kz	MTS	Operational	GSM 900 / GSM 1800 / UMTS 900 / UMTS 2100 / 5G 3500	Called Mobile Telecom Service before its acquisition by Tele2

==== North Korea – KP ====
MCC	MNC	Brand	Operator	Status	Bands (MHz)	References and notes
467	05	Koryolink	Cheo Technology Jv Company	Operational	UMTS 2100	for foreigners
467	06	Kangsong NET	Korea Posts and Telecommunications Corporation	Operational	UMTS 2100 / LTE	for DPRK citizens. Government owned.
467	193	SunNet	Korea Posts and Telecommunications Corporation	Not operational	GSM 900	

==== South Korea – KR ====
MCC	MNC	Brand	Operator	Status	Bands (MHz)	References and notes
450	01		Globalstar Asia Pacific	Operational	Satellite	
450	02	KT	KT	Operational	5G 3500	Former Hansol PCS (CDMA 1800), merged with KT in 2002
450	03	Power 017	Shinsegi Telecom, Inc.	Not operational	CDMA 850	Merged with SK Telecom in 2002; MNC withdrawn
450	04	KT	KT	Operational	LTE 1800	NB-IoT network (LTE Cat NB1); former CDMA 1800
450	05	SKTelecom	SK Telecom	Operational	UMTS 2100 / LTE 850 / LTE 1800 / LTE 2100 / LTE 2600 / 5G 3500	CDMA 850 shut down June 2020
450	06	LG U+	LG Uplus	Operational	LTE 850 / LTE 2100 / LTE 2600 / 5G 3500	Former LG Telecom; CDMA 1800 shut down June 2021
450	07	KT	KT	Unknown	Unknown	
450	08	olleh	KT	Operational	UMTS 2100 / LTE 900 / LTE 1800 / LTE 2100	
450	11	Tplus	Korea Cable Telecom	Operational	MVNO	MVNO of SK Telecom
450	12	SKTelecom	SK Telecom	Operational	LTE 850 / LTE 1800	IoT network (LTE Cat M1)

==== Kuwait – KW ====
MCC	MNC	Brand	Operator	Status	Bands (MHz)	References and notes
419	02	zain KW	Zain Kuwait	Operational	GSM 900 / GSM 1800 / UMTS 2100 / LTE 1800 / 5G 3500	
419	03	Ooredoo	National Mobile Telecommunications	Operational	GSM 900 / GSM 1800 / UMTS 900 / UMTS 2100 / LTE 800 / LTE 1800 / 5G 3500	
419	04	STC	Saudi Telecom Company	Operational	GSM 900 / GSM 1800 / UMTS 2100 / LTE 1800 / 5G 2100 / 5G 3500	Former VIVA

==== Kyrgyzstan – KG ====
MCC	MNC	Brand	Operator	Status	Bands (MHz)	References and notes
437	01	Beeline	Sky Mobile Ltd	Operational	GSM 900 / GSM 1800 / UMTS 2100 / LTE 800	Former Bitel
437	03		NurTelecom LLC	Unknown	Unknown	Former Fonex/Aktel, 7 Mobile
437	04		Alfa Telecom CJSC	Unknown	Unknown	
437	05	MegaCom	Alfa Telecom CJSC	Operational	GSM 900 / GSM 1800 / UMTS 900 / UMTS 2100 / LTE 800 / LTE 1800 / LTE 2100	
437	06		Kyrgyztelecom OJSC	Unknown	Unknown	
437	09	O!	NurTelecom LLC	Operational	GSM 900 / GSM 1800 / UMTS 900 / UMTS 2100 / LTE 800 / LTE 2600	
437	10		Saima Telecom	Operational	LTE 2600	
437	11		iTel	Not operational	Unknown	MNC withdrawn

=== L ===
==== Laos – LA ====
MCC	MNC	Brand	Operator	Status	Bands (MHz)	References and notes
457	01	LaoTel	Lao Telecom	Operational	GSM 900 / GSM 1800 / UMTS 2100 / LTE 1800 / 5G	
457	02	ETL	Enterprise of Telecommunications Lao	Operational	GSM 900 / GSM 1800 / UMTS 2100	
457	03	Unitel	Star Telecom Co., Ltd	Operational	GSM 900 / GSM 1800 / UMTS 2100 / LTE 1800	Former Lao-Asia Telecom Company (LAT); owned by Viettel
457	07	Best	Best Telecom Co., Ltd	Operational	GSM 900 / GSM 1800 / UMTS 2100	
457	08	TPLUS	TPLUS Digital Sole Co., Ltd	Operational	GSM 900 / GSM 1800 / UMTS 2100	Former Millicom (Tigo), VimpelCom (Beeline)

==== Lebanon – LB ====
MCC	MNC	Brand	Operator	Status	Bands (MHz)	References and notes
415	01	Alfa	MIC 1	Operational	GSM 900 / UMTS 2100 / LTE 800 / LTE 1800	
415	03	Touch	MIC 2	Operational	GSM 900 / UMTS 2100 / LTE 800 / LTE 1800	
415	05	Ogero Mobile	Ogero Telecom	Not operational	GSM 900	
415	36	Libancell		UNKNOWN	UNKNOWN	
415	37	Libancell		UNKNOWN	UNKNOWN	
415	38	Libancell		UNKNOWN	UNKNOWN	
415	39	Libancell		UNKNOWN	UNKNOWN	

=== M ===
==== Macau (Special administrative region of the People's Republic of China) – MO ====
MCC	MNC	Brand	Operator	Status	Bands (MHz)	References and notes
455	00	SmarTone	Smartone – Comunicações Móveis, S.A.	Not operational	UMTS 2100 / LTE 1800	Shut down Nov 2024; MNC withdrawn
455	01	CTM	Companhia de Telecomunicações de Macau, S.A.R.L.	Operational	LTE 900 / LTE 1800 / LTE 2100 / 5G 700 / 5G 2100 / 5G 3500 / 5G 4900	GSM shut down Aug 2019
455	02	China Telecom	China Telecom (Macau) Company Limited	Not operational	CDMA 800	Shut down 2010
455	03	HT Macau / 3 Macau	Hutchison Telephone (Macau), Limitada	Unknown	UMTS 2100	GSM shut down Aug 2019, 3G shut down Jun 2025
455	04	CTM	Companhia de Telecomunicações de Macau, S.A.R.L.	Unknown	UMTS 2100	GSM shut down Aug 2019, 3G shut down Jun 2025
455	05	3 Macau	Hutchison Telephone (Macau), Limitada	Operational	LTE 900 / LTE 1800	
455	06	SmarTone	Smartone – Comunicações Móveis, S.A.	Not operational	UMTS 2100	Shut down Nov 2024; MNC withdrawn
455	07	China Telecom	China Telecom (Macau) Limitada	Operational	LTE 850 / LTE 1800 / LTE 2100 / 5G 700 / 5G 2100 / 5G 3500	

==== Maldives – MV ====
MCC	MNC	Brand	Operator	Status	Bands (MHz)	References and notes
472	01	Dhiraagu	Dhivehi Raajjeyge Gulhun	Operational	GSM 900 / UMTS 2100 / LTE 1800 / LTE 2600 / 5G 3500	
472	02	Ooredoo	Ooredoo Maldives	Operational	GSM 900 / UMTS 2100 / LTE 1800 / LTE 2600 / 5G	Former Wataniya Telecom

==== Mongolia – MN ====
MCC	MNC	Brand	Operator	Status	Bands (MHz)	References and notes
428	33	ONDO	IN Mobile Network LLC	Operational	LTE	
428	88	Unitel	Unitel LLC	Operational	GSM 900 / GSM 1800 / UMTS 2100 / LTE 700 / LTE 1800 / TD-LTE 2300	
428	91	Skytel	Skytel LLC	Operational	UMTS 2100 / LTE 1800	CDMA shut down June 2025
428	98	G-Mobile	G-Mobile LLC	Operational	CDMA 450 / UMTS 2100 / LTE 1800	
428	99	Mobicom	Mobicom Corporation	Operational	GSM 900 / UMTS 2100 / LTE 700 / LTE 1800	

==== Myanmar – MM ====
MCC	MNC	Brand	Operator	Status	Bands (MHz)	References and notes
414	00	MPT	Myanmar Posts and Telecommunications	Unknown	Unknown	
414	01	MPT	Myanmar Posts and Telecommunications	Operational	GSM 900 / UMTS 2100 / LTE 1800 / LTE 2100	
414	02	MPT	Myanmar Posts and Telecommunications	Unknown	Unknown	
414	03	CDMA800	Myanmar Economic Corporation	Operational	CDMA 800	
414	04	MPT	Myanmar Posts and Telecommunications	Unknown	Unknown	
414	05	Ooredoo	Ooredoo Myanmar	Operational	UMTS 900 / UMTS 2100 / LTE 1800 / LTE 2100	
414	06	ATOM	M1 Group	Operational	GSM 900 / UMTS 2100 / LTE 1800 / LTE 2100	Former Telenor
414	09	Mytel	Myanmar National Tele & Communication Co., Ltd	Operational	GSM 900 / UMTS 900 / UMTS 2100 / LTE 900 / LTE 2100	
414	20	ACS	Amara Communication Co., Ltd	Operational	TD-LTE 2600	
414	21	ACS	Amara Communication Co., Ltd	Operational	TD-LTE 2600	
414	22		Fortune Telecom Co., Ltd	Unknown	Unknown	
414	23		Global Technology Co., Ltd	Unknown	Unknown	

=== N ===
==== Nepal – NP ====
MCC	MNC	Brand	Operator	Status	Bands (MHz)	References and notes
429	01	Namaste / NT Mobile / Sky Phone	Nepal Telecom (NDCL)	Operational	GSM 900 / UMTS 2100 / LTE 800 / LTE 1800	WiMAX 2300, CDMA 850 shut down in 2021
429	02	Ncell	Ncell Pvt. Ltd.	Operational	GSM 900 / UMTS 2100 / LTE 900 / LTE 1800	
429	03	UTL	United Telecom Limited	Operational	CDMA2000 800	
429	04	SmartCell	Smart Telecom Pvt. Ltd. (STPL)	Operational	GSM 900 / GSM 1800 / UMTS 2100 / LTE 1800	

=== O ===
==== Oman – OM ====
MCC	MNC	Brand	Operator	Status	Bands (MHz)	References and notes
422	02	Omantel	Oman Telecommunications Company	Operational	GSM 900 / GSM 1800 / LTE 1800 / TD-LTE 2300 / 5G 3500	UMTS shut down July 2025
422	03	Ooredoo	Omani Qatari Telecommunications Company SAOC	Operational	GSM 900 / GSM 1800 / UMTS 900 / LTE 800 / LTE 1800 / TD-LTE 2300 / 5G 3500	Former Nawras
422	04	Omantel	Oman Telecommunications Company	Unknown	Unknown	
422	06	Vodafone	Oman Future Telecommunications Company SAOC	Operational	5G 700 / 5G 1800 / 5G 2600	

=== P ===
==== Pakistan – PK ====
MCC	MNC	Brand	Operator	Status	Bands (MHz)	References and notes
410	01	Jazz	Mobilink-PMCL	Operational	GSM 900 / GSM 1800 / LTE 900 / LTE 1800 / LTE 2100 / 5G 700 / 5G 2300 / 5G 2500 / 5G 3500	Former Mobilink; UMTS shut down Nov 2024
410	02	3G EVO / CharJi 4G	PTCL	Operational	CDMA2000 1900 / TD-LTE 1900	
410	03	Ufone	Pakistan Telecommunication Mobile Ltd	Operational	GSM 900 / GSM 1800 / UMTS 900 / UMTS 2100 / LTE 1800 / 5G 2500 / 5G 3500	
410	04	Zong	China Mobile	Operational	GSM 900 / GSM 1800 / UMTS 2100 / LTE 1800 / LTE 2100 / 5G 2500 / 5G 3500	Former Paktel
410	05	SCO Mobile	SCO Mobile Ltd	Operational	GSM 900 / GSM 1800 / UMTS 2100 / LTE 1800	
410	06	Telenor	Telenor Pakistan	Operational	GSM 900 / GSM 1800 / UMTS 850 / UMTS 2100 / LTE 850 / LTE 1800	
410	07	Jazz	WaridTel	Operational	GSM 900 / GSM 1800 / LTE 900 / LTE 1800 / LTE 2100	Former Warid Pakistan; UMTS shut down Nov 2024
410	08	SCO Mobile	SCO Mobile Ltd	Operational	GSM 900 / GSM 1800 / UMTS 2100 / LTE 1800	

==== Palestine – PS ====
(Uses the MCC of Israel)

MCC	MNC	Brand	Operator	Status	Bands (MHz)	References and notes
425	05	Jawwal	Palestine Cellular Communications, Ltd.	Operational	GSM 900 / UMTS 2100	
425	06	Ooredoo	Ooredoo Palestine	Operational	GSM 900 / GSM 1800 / UMTS 2100	Former Wataniya

=== Q ===
==== Qatar – QA ====
MCC	MNC	Brand	Operator	Status	Bands (MHz)	References and notes
427	01	Ooredoo	Ooredoo	Operational	GSM 900 / GSM 1800 / LTE 800 / LTE 1800 / LTE 2600 / 5G 3500	Former Qtel (Qatar Telecom); UMTS shut down Dec 2025
427	02	Vodafone	Vodafone Qatar	Operational	GSM 900 / GSM 1800 / LTE 800 / LTE 1800 / LTE 2600 / 5G 3500	UMTS shut down Dec 2025
427	05	Ministry of Interior	Ministry of Interior	Operational	TETRA 380	
427	06	Ministry of Interior	Ministry of Interior	Operational	LTE	

=== S ===
==== Saudi Arabia – SA ====
MCC	MNC	Brand	Operator	Status	Bands (MHz)	References and notes
420	01	Al Jawal (STC )	Saudi Telecom Company	Operational	GSM 900 / LTE 700 / LTE 1800 / LTE 2100 / TD-LTE 2300 / 5G 3500	UMTS shut down Q4 2022, GSM to shut down Q4 2025
420	03	Mobily	Etihad Etisalat Company	Operational	GSM 900 / UMTS 900 / UMTS 2100 / LTE 1800 / TD-LTE 2500	
420	04	Zain SA	Zain Saudi Arabia	Operational	GSM 900 / GSM 1800 / UMTS 900 / UMTS 2100 / LTE 900 / LTE 1800 / LTE 2100 / TD-LTE 2500 / 5G 2500 / 5G 3500	Active September 2008
420	05	Virgin Mobile	Virgin Mobile Saudi Arabia	Operational	MVNO	Uses Al Jawal network
420	06	Lebara Mobile	Lebara Mobile	Operational	MVNO	
420	09	Salam	Salam	Unknown	Unknown	
420	10	Future Networks Communications	Future Networks Communications	Unknown	MVNO	
420	21	RGSM	Saudi Railways GSM	Operational	GSM-R 900	

==== Sri Lanka – LK ====
MCC	MNC	Brand	Operator	Status	Bands (MHz)	References and notes
413	01	SLTMobitel	Mobitel (Pvt) Ltd	Operational	GSM 900 / GSM 1800 / UMTS 2100 / LTE 850 / LTE 900 / LTE 1800 / LTE 2100	
413	02	Dialog	Dialog Axiata PLC	Operational	GSM 900 / GSM 1800 / LTE 1800 / 5G 3500	Former MTN; UMTS shut down 2023
413	03	Hutch	Hutchison Telecommunications Lanka (Pvt) Ltd	Not operational	GSM 900 / GSM 1800 / UMTS 2100	Former Etisalat; MNC withdrawn
413	04	Lanka Bell	Lanka Bell Ltd	Not operational	CDMA / WiMAX / TD-LTE 2300	Shut down
413	05	Airtel	Bharti Airtel Lanka (Pvt) Ltd	Not operational	GSM 900 / GSM 1800 / LTE 850 / LTE 2100 / TD-LTE 2500	Acquired by Dialog Axiata
413	08	Hutch	Hutchison Telecommunications Lanka (Pvt) Ltd	Operational	GSM 900 / UMTS 2100 / LTE 900 / LTE 1800	
413	09	Hutch	Hutchison Telecommunications Lanka (Pvt) Ltd	Not operational	GSM 900 / GSM 1800 / UMTS 2100 / LTE 900 / LTE 1800	MNC withdrawn
413	11	Dialog	Dialog Broadband Networks (Pvt) Ltd	Operational	CDMA / WiMAX / TD-LTE 2300	Fixed wireless
413	12	SLTMobitel	Sri Lanka Telecom PLC	Operational	TD-LTE 2600	Fixed wireless

==== Syria – SY ====
MCC	MNC	Brand	Operator	Status	Bands (MHz)	References and notes
417	01	Syriatel	Syriatel Mobile Telecom	Operational	GSM 900 / GSM 1800 / UMTS 2100 / LTE 1800	
417	02	MTN	MTN Syria/TeleInvest	Operational	GSM 900 / GSM 1800 / UMTS 2100 / LTE 1800	Former Spacetel
417	03		Wafa Telecom	Not operational	Unknown	
417	09		Syrian Telecom	Unknown	Unknown	
417	50	Rcell	Rcell	Operational	LTE 800 / LTE 2600	

=== T ===
==== Taiwan – TW ====
MCC	MNC	Brand	Operator	Status	Bands (MHz)	References and notes
466	01	FarEasTone	Far EasTone Telecommunications Co Ltd	Operational	LTE 700 / LTE 1800 / LTE 2100 / LTE 2600 / 5G 2100 / 5G 3500	LTE band 28;
466	02	FarEasTone	Far EasTone Telecommunications Co Ltd	Not operational	GSM 900	GSM shut down July 2017
466	03	FarEasTone	Far EasTone Telecommunications Co Ltd	Not operational	UMTS 2100	UMTS shut down Dec 2018
466	05	Gt	Asia Pacific Telecom	Operational	LTE 700 / LTE 900 / TD-LTE 2600 / 5G 3500 / 5G 28000	LTE bands 28 / 8 / 41; CDMA 850 MHz shut down Dec 2017
466	06	FarEasTone	Far EasTone Telecommunications Co Ltd	Not operational	GSM 1800	Former KG Telecom until 2004; MNC withdrawn
466	07	FarEasTone	Far EasTone Telecommunications Co Ltd	Not operational	WiMAX 2600	Shut down in 2015; MNC withdrawn
466	09	VMAX	Vmax Telecom	Not operational	WiMAX 2600	MNC withdrawn
466	10	G1	Global Mobile Corp.	Not operational	WiMAX 2600	MNC withdrawn
466	11	Chunghwa LDM	LDTA/Chunghwa Telecom	Not operational	GSM 1800	Also known as "Long Distance & Mobile Business Group"
466	12		Asia Pacific Telecom	Operational	LTE 700 / LTE 900	Former Ambit Microsystems (subsidiary of Foxconn); LTE band 28
466	56	FITEL	First International Telecom	Not operational	WiMAX 2600 / PHS	MNC withdrawn
466	68		Tatung InfoComm	Not operational	WiMAX 2600	License expired in 2014, MNC withdrawn
466	88	FarEasTone	Far EasTone Telecommunications Co Ltd	Not operational	GSM 1800	Former KG Telecom until 2004, KG Telecom brand used until 2009
466	89	T Star	Taiwan Star Telecom	Operational	LTE 900 / LTE 2600 / 5G 3500	Former Vibo; UMTS shut down Dec 2018; acquired by Taiwan Mobile
466	90	T Star	Taiwan Star Telecom	Not operational	LTE 900	acquired by Taiwan Mobile; MNC withdrawn
466	92	Chunghwa	Chunghwa Telecom	Operational	LTE 900 / LTE 1800 / LTE 2100 / LTE 2600 / 5G 2100 / 5G 3500	GSM shut down July 2017; UMTS shut down Dec 2018
466	93	Taiwan Mobile	Taiwan Mobile Co. Ltd	Not operational	GSM 900	Acquired by Taiwan Mobile in 2004, MobiTai brand used until 2008
466	97	Taiwan Mobile	Taiwan Mobile Co. Ltd	Operational	LTE 700 / LTE 1800 / LTE 2100 / 5G 3500	LTE band 28; GSM shut down July 2017; UMTS shut down Dec 2018
466	99	Taiwan Mobile	Taiwan Mobile Co. Ltd	Not operational	GSM 900	Acquired by Taiwan Mobile in 2002, TransAsia brand used until 2008

==== Tajikistan – TJ ====
MCC	MNC	Brand	Operator	Status	Bands (MHz)	References and notes
436	01	Tcell	JV Somoncom	Operational	GSM 900 / GSM 1800 / UMTS 2100 / LTE 800 / 5G 3500	
436	02	Tcell	Indigo Tajikistan	Operational	GSM 900 / GSM 1800 / UMTS 2100 / LTE 800 / 5G 3500	
436	03	MegaFon	TT Mobile	Operational	GSM 900 / GSM 1800 / UMTS 2100 / LTE 800 / LTE 1800 / LTE 2300 / LTE 2600	
436	04	Babilon-M	Babilon-Mobile	Operational	GSM 900 / GSM 1800 / UMTS 900 / UMTS 2100 / LTE 1800 / LTE 2100	
436	05	ZET-Mobile	Tacom	Operational	GSM 900 / GSM 1800 / UMTS 2100 / LTE 800 / LTE 2100	Former Beeline
436	10	Babilon-T	Babilon-T	Operational	TD-LTE 2300 / WiMAX	
436	12	Tcell	Indigo	Unknown	UMTS 2100	

==== Turkmenistan – TM ====
MCC	MNC	Brand	Operator	Status	Bands (MHz)	References and notes
438	01	MTS	MTS Turkmenistan	Not operational	GSM 900 / GSM 1800 / UMTS 2100	Forced to shut down 2017
438	02	TM-Cell	Altyn Asyr	Operational	GSM 900 / GSM 1800 / UMTS 2100 / LTE 2600	
438	03	AGTS CDMA	AŞTU	Operational	CDMA 450	

=== U ===
==== United Arab Emirates – AE ====
MCC	MNC	Brand	Operator	Status	Bands (MHz)	References and notes
424	02	Etisalat	Emirates Telecom Corp	Operational	LTE 800 / LTE 1800 / LTE 2600 / 5G 2500 / 5G 3500	GSM shut down Dec 2023
424	03	du	Emirates Integrated Telecommunications Company	Operational	UMTS 2100 / LTE 800 / LTE 1800 / 5G 2500 / 5G 3500 / 5G 26000	GSM shut down Dec 2023

==== Uzbekistan – UZ ====
MCC	MNC	Brand	Operator	Status	Bands (MHz)	References and notes
434	01		Buztel	Not operational	GSM 900 / GSM 1800	
434	02		Uzmacom	Not operational	GSM 900 / GSM 1800	
434	03	UzMobile	Uzbektelekom	Operational	CDMA 450	EVDO Rev A
434	04	Beeline	Unitel LLC	Operational	GSM 900 / GSM 1800 / UMTS 2100 / LTE 2600	Former Daewoo Unitel
434	05	Ucell	Coscom	Operational	GSM 900 / GSM 1800 / UMTS 2100 / LTE 700 / LTE 1800 / LTE 2600 / 5G 3500	
434	06	Perfectum Mobile	RUBICON WIRELESS COMMUNICATION	Operational	CDMA 800	
434	07	Mobiuz	Universal Mobile Systems (UMS)	Operational	GSM 900 / GSM 1800 / UMTS 2100 / LTE 800 / 5G	
434	08	UzMobile	Uzbektelekom	Operational	GSM 900 / GSM 1800 / UMTS 2100 / LTE 1800 / LTE 700 / 5G 3500	
434	09	EVO	OOO «Super iMAX»	Operational	WiMAX / LTE 2300	
434	10	HUMANS	OOO «HUMANS»	Operational	MVNO	Uses UzMobile

=== V ===
==== Vietnam – VN ====
MCC	MNC	Brand	Operator	Status	Bands (MHz)	References and notes
452	01	MobiFone	Vietnam Mobile Telecom Services Company	Operational	UMTS 900 / UMTS 2100 / LTE 900 / LTE 1800 / 5G 3800	GSM shut down Sep 2026
452	02	Vinaphone	Vietnam Telecom Services Company	Operational	UMTS 900 / UMTS 2100 / LTE 900 / 5G 3700	GSM shut down Sep 2026
452	03	S-Fone	S-Telecom	Not operational	CDMA2000 800	License revoked; MNC withdrawn
452	04	Viettel Mobile	Viettel Telecom	Operational	UMTS 900 / UMTS 2100 / LTE 900 / LTE 1800 / 5G 700 / 5G 2500	GSM shut down Nov 2024
452	05	Vietnamobile	Hanoi Telecom	Operational	UMTS 2100	GSM shut down Sep 2026
452	06	EVNTelecom	EVN Telecom	Not operational	CDMA2000 450	License revoked; MNC withdrawn
452	07	Gmobile	GTEL Mobile JSC	Operational	MVNO	Former Beeline; GSM shut down Sep 2026; uses Vinaphone
452	08	I-Telecom	Indochina Telecom	Operational	MVNO	Former EVNTelecom; uses Vinaphone
452	09	Wintel	Mobicast JSC	Operational	MVNO	Former Reddi; uses Vinaphone

=== Y ===
==== Yemen – YE ====
MCC	MNC	Brand	Operator	Status	Bands (MHz)	References and notes
421	01	SabaFon	SabaFon	Operational	GSM 900	
421	02	YOU	Yemen Oman United Telecom	Operational	GSM 900 / LTE	Former Spacetel, MTN
421	03	Yemen Mobile	Yemen Mobile	Operational	CDMA 850	
421	04	Y	HiTS-UNITEL	Operational	GSM 900	
421	10	Yemen-4G	PTC/Yemen-Telecom	Operational	700/1800/2600	
421	11	Yemen Mobile	Yemen Mobile	Operational	LTE 3	

== See also ==
- List of mobile network operators of the Asia Pacific region
- List of LTE networks in Asia
