= Kulpa =

Kulpa may refer to:

== Places ==
- Kulpa, Astrakhan Oblast, Russia
- Kulpa, Balaghat district, Madhya Pradesh, India

== People ==
- Dick Kulpa, American cartoonist
- Ron Kulpa (born 1968), American umpire in Major League Baseball.
- Zenon Kulpa (born 1946) is a Polish academic
