= Miriya =

Miriya may refer to:

- Miriya, Balaghat, a village in Madhya Pradesh, India
- Miriya Parina, a character from Robotech
