= Miriya, Balaghat =

Miriya
- Village
- Country: India
- State: Madhya Pradesh
- District: Balaghat
- Block: Lanji
- Vehicle Registration No.: NO RTO SERVICE
- Language: Hindi, Marathi, Rural
- Wikipedians: Vikalp Ganvir

Population (2011)
  - Total: 2,179 in which (1,070 male & 1,109 female)
- Time zone: UTC+5:30 (IST)
- PIN: 481224

Miriya is a village in Lanji in Balaghat district of Madhya Pradesh. It is located 15 kilometres (9.3 mi) from sub district headquarter and 75 kilometres (47 mi) from district headquarter.

== Demography ==
As of 2011, The village has a total number of 554 houses and the population of 2,179 of which include 1070 are males while 1109 are females according to the report published by Census India in 2011. The literacy rate of the village is 76.57%, lower than the state average of 85.43%. The population of children under the age of 6 years is 280 which is 12.85% of total population of the village, and child sex ratio is approximately 1154 lower than the state average of 918.

== Schools ==
- Govt. Primary school miriya
- Govt. Middle school miriya

== Nearby villages ==
- Bothali
- Ghansa
- Singola
- Karanja
- Tekepar
- Kulpa

== Communication providers ==
Idea, Airtel, BSNL, Jio, are cellular communication provider in Miriya.

== Railway service ==
- Amgaon (15 km)
- Salekasa (30 km)
