= MTS India =

Telecommunication company

- Trade name: SSTL
- Formerly: Sistema Shyam Teleservices Limited
- Type: Subsidiary
- Industry: Telecommunications
- Founded: 2008; 18 years ago
- Defunct: 2017; 9 years ago
- Fate: Acquired by Reliance Communications
- Headquarters: New Delhi, India
- Area served: India
- Key people: Dmitry Shukov (CEO)
- Services: Mobile telephony; Wireless broadband; Internet services
- Owner: Reliance Communications
- Parent: Sistema

Mobile TeleSystems India (MTS India) was a telecommunications company headquartered in Delhi, India. It was a joint venture and Indian subsidiary of the Russian mobile operator MTS. The company provided wireless voice, broadband Internet, messaging and data services in India.

MTS India was acquired by Reliance Communications (RCom) on 14 January 2016 in an all-stock deal, in which SSTL received a 10% share in RCom. SSTL was merged into RCom on 31 October 2017.

== History ==
Sistema, the largest public diversified corporation in Russia, acquired a 10% stake in Shyam Telelink for a total cash consideration of US$11.4 million at the end of September 2007. Shantanu Telecom along with their partner Sistema had applied for UASL licence in 22 telecom circles of India. In August 2008, they got a pan-India start-up spectrum to start their mobile service operations in the country. They provide mobile services based on CDMA technology under the brand name MTS India and gave contracts to ZTE and Huawei for network expansion. MTS launched Kolkata & West Bengal in May'2009. MTS launched operations in Uttar Pradesh East and West in October 2010.

On 2 February 2012, the Supreme Court of India cancelled 122 licences of 22 mobile operators, including 21 of MTS' 22 licences, in connection with the 2G spectrum case. MTS lost all its licences except the one for Rajasthan circle. MTS had approximately 2.32 million subscribers in those 10 circles at the time of the announcement, and 14.88 million subscribers nationally. According to MTS officials, the 10 circles where MTS ceased operations constituted 15.62% of its total subscriber base and less than 15% of the company's overall revenue. In the 2013 spectrum auction, MTS won back licences and spectrum in 8 circles - Delhi NCR, Kolkata, Gujarat, Karnataka, Tamil Nadu, Kerala, Uttar Pradesh (West) and West Bengal.

=== Acquisition by Reliance Communications ===
On 14 January 2016, Reliance Communications (RCom) announced that it had acquired SSTL in an all-stock deal, in which SSTL received a 10% share in RCom, after paying off its existing debt. RCom would assume the liability for installments that SSTL had to pay the government from purchasing spectrum. The liability amounted ₹ 392 crore annually for 10 years. As a result of the deal, Reliance acquired nearly 9 million subscribers, as well as SSTL's spectrum in the 850 MHz band. The merger deal was approved by the Competition Commission of India (CCI) in February 2016. SEBI cleared the deal by March, and SSTL shareholders approved the deal on 18 March. By mid-August, the deal was approved by tax authorities and the shareholders and creditors of RCom and SSTL. The merger was approved by the Rajasthan High Court on 30 September 2016, and the Mumbai High Court on 7 October 2016.

The final approval, from the Department of Telecommunications, was given on 20 October 2017. On 31 October 2017, RCom announced that it completed the merger.
