= Tcell =

CJSC Indigo Tajikistan CJSC JV Somoncom
- Headquarters of Tcell in Dushanbe
- Trade name: Tcell
- Native name: ҶСП Индиго Тоҷикистон (Tajik); ҶСП КМ Сомонком (Tajik)
- Formerly: Indigo
- Type: Private
- Industry: Telecommunications
- Founded: November 2001; 25 years ago
- Headquarters: Dushanbe, Tajikistan
- Area served: Indigo Tajikistan: Dushanbe, Khatlon, RRP, GBAO regions Somoncom: Sughd region
- Key people: Ozodkhon Davlatshoev (CEO)
- Products: Cellular network, mobile broadband, fixed broadband
- Parent: Aga Khan Fund for Economic Development
- Website: www.tcell.tj

Tcell is a Tajikistani mobile network operator headquartered in Dushanbe. It is one of four major mobile network operators in the country, and is the largest by number of subscribers.

Tcell operates through two legal entities in Tajikistan: CJSC Indigo Tajikistan, which serves the Dushanbe, Khatlon, RRP, and GBAO regions; and CJSC JV Somoncom, which serves the Sughd region. The company is wholly owned by the Aga Khan Fund for Economic Development (AKFED), as part of the Aga Khan Development Network. Established in 1998 and 2001 separately, it was formerly a joint venture with the Nordic operator TeliaSonera until 2016.

== History ==
=== Establishment ===
Following the dissolution of the Soviet Union and the subsequent Tajikistani Civil War, Tajikistan's telecommunications network fell into disrepair, with little coverage outside the cities. People in rural districts often had to travel to one of a few public landline stations and wait for hours to make a call.

In 1998, the American Company, MCT Corporation, established JV Somoncom, the first company in Tajikistan to provide GSM (2G) mobile services in Khujand and the wider Sughd Region. The company was named after the Samanid ruler Ismail Samani.

Separately, in November 2001, AKFED partnered with MCT Corporation to launch JV Indigo Tajikistan, as part of efforts to spur competition and improve the country's mobile services industry. The operations of JV Indigo Tajikistan began in July 2002. The following year Somoncom and Indigo Tajikistan network were linked and began operating under the single brand name "Indigo". Indigo became the first operator in Central Asia to launch UMTS (3G) mobile services, which made Tajikistan the first of the five Central Asian republics with a 3G mobile network.

=== Purchase by TeliaSonera ===
In July 2007, MCT Corporation's stake in Indigo was acquired by TeliaSonera, a Nordic mobile network operator. TeliaSonera held a 60 per cent controlling stake, with AKFED owning the remaining 40 per cent.

In March 2010, "Tcell" became the company's common brand, replacing "Indigo". That year, Tcell was the largest mobile operator in Tajikistan both by revenue, with annual figures in excess of US$110 million, and by subscriber base, with over 30 percent market share. In April 2014, Tcell launched 4G LTE services across the country.

=== Ownership by AKFED ===
On 7 September 2016, TeliaSonera sold its 60 per cent stake to AKFED, making AKFED the sole owner of Tcell. The deal valued Tcell at US$66 million, with TeliaSonera's share worth US$39 million. The sale came as TeliaSonera, hit by a bribery scandal in Uzbekistan, was reducing its business presence in Central Asia.

In 2019, Tcell launched 5G services in Dushanbe. In 2023, the company also launched GPON fibre-based fixed broadband services, both of which further expanded high speed internet access to residents and businesses in the capital.

In October 2025, Tcell signed a US$30 million local currency financing agreement with the Asian Development Bank (ADB). The funding is meant to expand and modernise mobile connectivity across the country. It focuses mainly on rural areas, where more than 70 per cent of the population lives, and will also extend Tcell's 5G network in the cities.

== Network ==
Frequencies used on Tcell Network in Tajikistan
| Class & Protocol | Frequency Bands | Launched |
|---|---|---|
| 2G (GSM) | 900 MHz, 1800 MHz | 1998, 2002 |
| 3G (UMTS) | 2100 MHz (B1) | 2006 |
| 4G (LTE) | 800 MHz (B20), 1800 MHz (B3), 2600 MHz (B7) | April 2014 |
| 5G | 3350 MHz (Bn78) | 2019 |
