= Videocon Telecom =

Indian cellular service provider

Videocon Telecommunications Limited
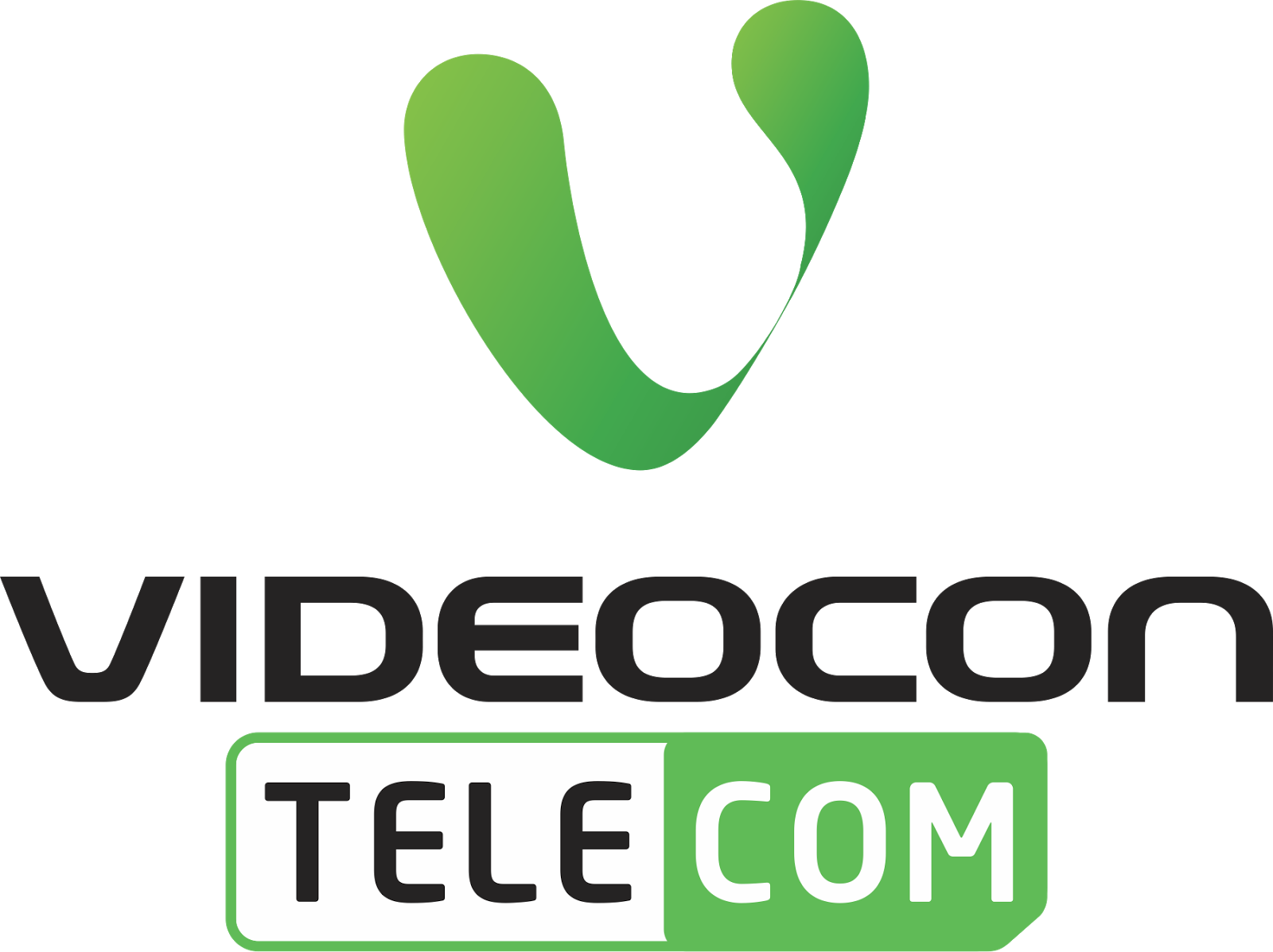
- Company type: Limited
- Industry: Telecommunications
- Founded: 2008
- Defunct: 11 May 2016
- Fate: Shut down following sale of spectrum to Bharti Airtel
- Headquarters: Gurgaon, Haryana, India
- Services: Mobile telephony
- Parent: Videocon Group
- Subsidiaries: Quadrant Televentures Ltd.

Videocon Telecommunications Limited, formerly Videocon Mobile Services, was an Indian cellular service provider that offered GSM mobile services in India under the brand name Videocon. The company was a subsidiary of the Videocon Group, and was headquartered at Gurgaon, Haryana. Videocon launched its services on 7 April 2010 in Mumbai. At its peak, Videocon held licences to provide mobile services in 18 out of 22 telecom circles of India. However, Videocon launched commercial services only in 11 out of the 18 circles it held licences in. Following the 2G spectrum case, the Supreme Court cancelled 122 licences issued by the Indian Government in 2008, including 21 licences belonging to Videocon.

In the 2012 spectrum auction, Videocon won back licences in 6 circles. On 16 March 2016, Videocon sold its spectrum in all six circles it operated in to Bharti Airtel. Videocon shut down its network and discontinued operations in the Gujarat and UP (West) circles on 26 December 2015, and in the Haryana, Madhya Pradhesh, Bihar and UP (East) circles on 11 May 2016.

== Sale of spectrum ==
In November 2015, Videocon entered into an agreement with Idea Cellular Ltd. to sell its spectrum in Gujarat and Uttar Pradesh (West) for ₹3,310 crore (US$350 million). By March 2016, Airtel offered to purchase spectrum in all six circles in which Videocon operated for ₹4,428 crore (US$460 million). Videocon had been looking to exit the telecom sector for some time, and on 16 March 2016, Airtel announced that it had entered into a definitive agreement with Videocon (subject to standard regulatory approvals) to purchase 2 x 5 MHz spectrum in the 1800 MHz Band in all six circles that Videcon had been allotted by the government.

On 24 May 2016, Airtel announced that the deal had successfully been completed.

== Operations in Punjab ==
Videocon's operations in the Punjab circle are run through its wholly owned subsidiary Quadrant Televentures Ltd (formerly HFCL Infotel). Quadrant's holdings were not a part of the sale to Airtel, and the company continues to offer GSM mobile services in Punjab. Quadrant also offers broadband and fixed line services in Punjab under its Connect Broadband brand.

In January 2017, Quadrant informed its three million subscribers that the company would cease mobile services in Punjab from 15 February 2017, and requested them to switch to other mobile network operators. In response, TRAI ordered Quadrant to surrender its Unified Access Service License (UASL) for the Punjab telecom circle. On 8 February, Quadrant informed TRAI that it could not surrender its licence as the company was only shutting down mobile services and would continue to offer wired internet services in Punjab. On 14 February, TRAI barred Quadrant from suspending its mobile services, and ordered the company to ensure continuity of service for its subscribers until its UASL for Punjab expires on 30 September 2017.

Quadrant has currently requested all of its mobile subscribers to port out of the network by midnight on 18 April 2017.

== Controversy ==
In 2012, the Supreme Court revoked Videocon's 15 telecom licenses pertaining to the allocation of 2G spectrum case. On 21 December 2017, the Central Bureau of Investigation court exonerated all the accused, including the former telecom minister A. Raja, in the 2008 2G spectrum case.
