= Telenor India =

Former Indian telecommunication company

- Formerly: Uninor Communications Services Pvt Ltd
- Type: Subsidiary
- Industry: Telecommunications
- Predecessor: Unitech Wireless Limited
- Founded: 2007; 19 years ago
- Defunct: 14 May 2019; 7 years ago
- Fate: Acquired by Bharti Airtel
- Headquarters: Connaught Place, New Delhi, India
- Area served: India
- Key people: Sharad Mehrotra (CEO)
- Services: Mobile telephony Wireless internet
- Owner: Bharti Airtel
- Members: 36.15 Million (2018)
- Number of employees: 4,010 (Q4 2016)
- Parent: Telenor Group

Telenor (India) Communications Private Limited, formerly known as Uninor, was a mobile network operator in India. The company was a wholly owned subsidiary of Norwegian telecommunications company Telenor. In February 2017, Telenor Group announced merging the India business with Bharti Airtel in a no-cash deal with liability of Airtel to take over the outstanding spectrum payments of Rs 1,650 crore post necessary regulatory approvals.

As of April 2018, it had 36.15 million subscribers. On 14 May 2018, DoT gave the final approval required for merging of Telenor India with Bharti Airtel.

== History ==
=== Foundation and growth ===
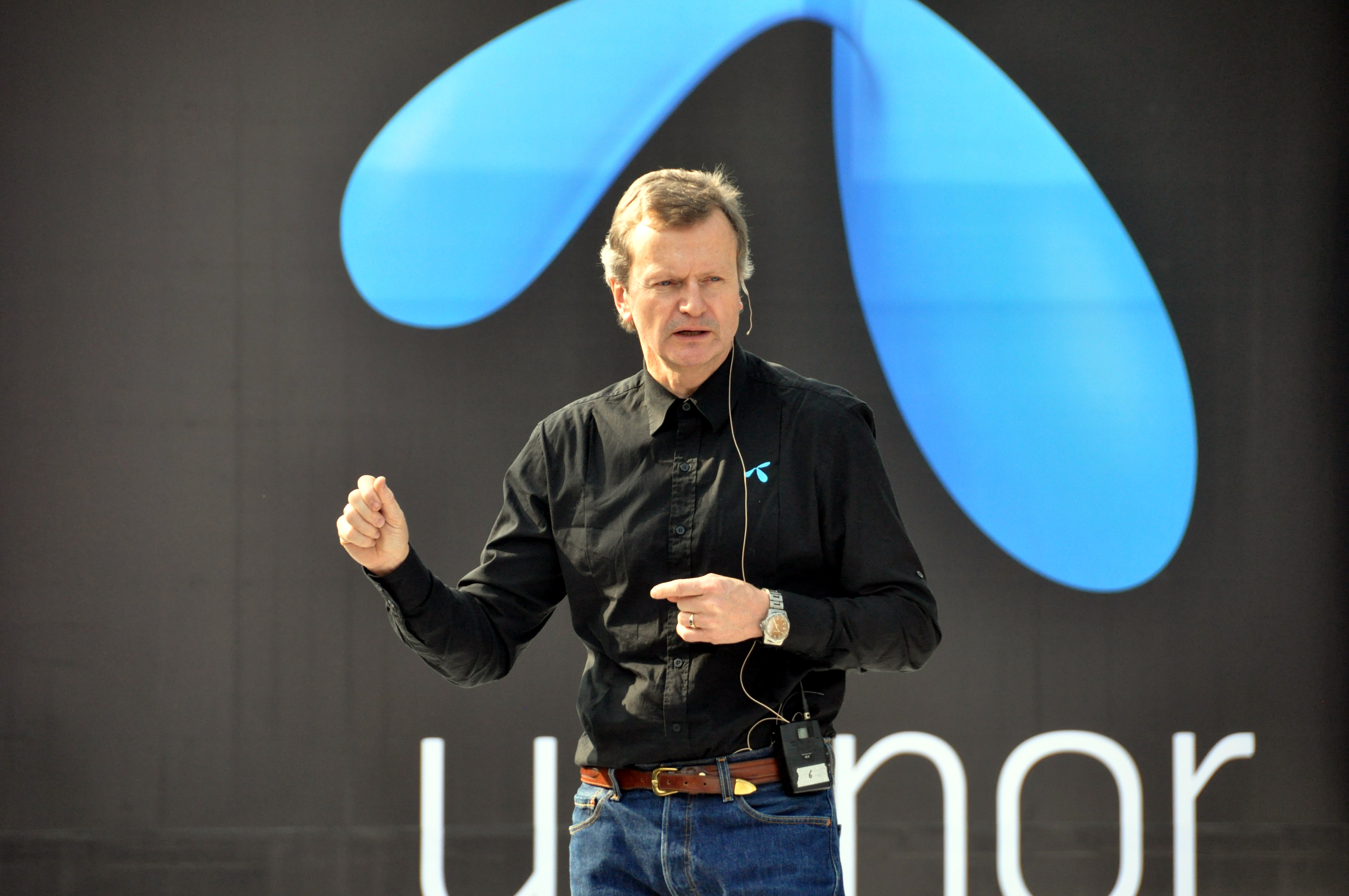
Telenor CEO Jon Fredrik Baksaas launching Uninor in 2009

The company Unitech Wireless Limited, a subsidiary of Unitech Group, was incorporated in 2008. The same year, the company was awarded wireless services licences for all 22 telecom circles. Subsequently, Unitech Group and Telenor Group agreed to enter a joint venture where Telenor would inject fresh equity investments of ₹61.35 billion into Unitech Wireless to take a majority stake in the company. This was operating capital invested directly in Unitech Wireless by Telenor Group. Telenor Group conducted these investments in four tranches, subsequent to approvals from the Foreign Investment Promotion Board (FIPB) and the Cabinet Committee of Economic Affairs (CCEA) took 67.25% ownership of Unitech Wireless. In September 2007, Unitech Wireless announced its brand name as Uninor.

Uninor launched in eight telecom circles on 3 December 2007, after completing one of the world's largest GSM Greenfield launches which was also one of the fastest telecom roll-outs ever in India. According to Uninor, the brand was built around an ambition to serve the young, aspiring India. Six months later, 5 additional circles were launched including metropolitan areas like Mumbai and Kolkata.

Uninor facilitated rapid scaling of the company through a lean operation model, where a large share of the network infrastructure is outsourced to business partners. Uninor's modern equipment enabled it to introduce targeted offerings and serve a large audience with limited spectrum. Uninor introduced dynamic pricing, a concept that gives consumers discounts that are based on current network traffic at an individual site and change with location and time. Over the summer of 2010, the company further simplified its strategy with a focus on three core areas – excellence in mass market distribution, basic services and cost efficient operations. Changes were also made to the product mix and marketing– making them simpler, more direct and clearly positioning Uninor as an affordable mass market service.

Uninor grew from 0 to 45.6 million customers (as of Q2 2012) within less than two years, and emerged as the most successful of the new entrants that obtained licenses in 2006. The company had more than double the subscribers of all of the other entrants combined.

=== License cancellations ===
On 2 February 2012, the Supreme Court of India cancelled 122 licenses of 22 mobile operators, including Uninor. In July 2012, Uninor decided to gradually scale down operations in 4 telecom circles - Karnataka, Kerala, Orissa, Goa and Maharashtra. The objective was to strengthen the focus on the top performing circles ahead of the 2012 spectrum auction. Uninor eventually shut down services in those 4 circles. In the 2012 auction, Uninor won back licences and spectrum in 6 telecom circles - Uttar Pradesh (East), Uttar Pradesh (West) & Uttarakhand, Bihar & Jharkhand, Gujarat, Tamil Nadu and Andhra Pradesh & Telangana. Uninor was about shut down services in Rajasthan, Punjab and West Bengal circles on 18 January 2013 but the deadline was extended to 16 February 2013. The Supreme Court on 15 February 2013 ordered companies that did not win spectrum in the November 2012 auction to immediately discontinue operations.

Uninor shut down services in Punjab, Rajasthan and West Bengal after midnight on 16 February 2013. According to a Uninor spokesperson, almost all Uninor subscribers in Punjab and West Bengal had ported out by 16 February 2013, as Uninor had informed them to do so in December 2012. The spokesperson further claimed that the "sudden apex court order did not give us [Uninor] the opportunity to inform Mumbai customers in advance". At the time of service shutting, Uninor still had 1.8 million subscribers in Mumbai.

=== Unitech exit and re-branding ===
Following the cancellation of Uninor's licences, Unitech and Telenor were involved in a dispute over control of Uninor. In October 2012, the two companies signed an agreement under which Unitech transferred Uninor assets to Telenor and exited the joint venture. Telenor subsequently formed Telewings Communications Services Private Limited, a joint venture with Lakshdeep Investments & Finance. Telenor held a 49% stake in Telewings. In December 2013, Telenor raised its stake in the company to 74%.

In 2014, Telenor Group raised its stake to control 100% of Telewings, and the company became a wholly owned subsidiary. On 23 September 2015, Uninor announced it has re-branded itself as Telenor India. The Telenor Group spent ₹100 crore on the re-branding exercise. The logotype, font and the visual expression follows that of the Telenor Group. Telenor India CEO Vivek Sood also stated that the company had broken even within four years of operations. Telewings Communications Services Private Limited was subsequently renamed Telenor (India) Communications Private Limited.

=== Sale to Bharti Airtel ===
On 2 January 2017, The Economic Times reported that Bharti Airtel had entered into discussions with Telenor India to acquire the latter. On 23 February 2017, Airtel announced that it had entered into a definitive agreement with Telenor South Asia Investments Pte Ltd to acquire Telenor (India) Communications Pvt. Ltd. As part of the deal, Airtel will acquire Telenor India's assets and customers in all seven telecom circles that the latter operates in - Andhra Pradesh, Bihar, Maharashtra, Gujarat, Uttar Pradesh (East), Uttar Pradesh (West) and Assam. Airtel will gain 43.4 MHz spectrum in the 1800 MHz band from the Telenor acquisition. In June 2017, Bharti Airtel received regulatory approval from CCI, SEBI and the stock exchanges. The deal was approved by the National Company Law Tribunal (NCLT) in August 2017.

On 21 September 2017, Airtel received its shareholders approval for acquisition of Telenor. NCLT approved the merger in March 2018. Airtel plans to retain around 4,000 of Telenor India and Tata Teleservices employees. Supreme Court allowed sale to Airtel by dismissing telecom department's order to Airtel to furnish a bank guarantee. Department of Telecom approved the merger of Telenor India with Bharti Airtel on 14 May 2018 paving the way for final commercial closing of the merger between the two companies.

== Network ==
=== Radio frequency summary ===
As of February 2017, Telenor India owns spectrum in 1800 MHz band, across 7 telecom circle areas in the country.

Telecom circle coverage	GSM / FD-LTE 1800MHz Band 3
Andhra Pradesh and Telangana	Yes
Assam	Yes
Bihar and Jharkhand	Yes
Uttar Pradesh (East)	Yes
Gujarat	Yes
Haryana	Yes
Mumbai	Yes
Kolkata	Yes
Uttar Pradesh (West)	Yes
Tamil Nadu	Yes

=== 4G launch ===
In February 2016, Telenor launched 4G services in the city of Varanasi. The company deployed narrow-band LTE on 1800 MHz spectrum. The network is the world's first commercial lean GSM network. Lean GSM is a technology developed by Huawei that compresses data to improve the efficiency of spectrum. Telenor refarmed 1.4 MHz of its 2G voice spectrum for data, maintaining the same voice quality while utilizing less spectrum.

=== Discontinued operations ===
Telenor discontinued its operations in seven telecom circle areas:

- West Bengal (shut down services after midnight on 16 February 2013)
- Karnataka (gradually scaled down from July 2012)
- Kerala (gradually scaled down from July 2012)
- Orissa (gradually scaled down from July 2012)
- Maharashtra & Goa (shut down services after midnight on 16 February 2013)
- Punjab (gradually scaled down from July 2012)
- Rajasthan (shut down services after midnight on 16 February 2013)

== Subscriber base ==
Telenor India had a subscriber base of 41.91 million in total across India, according to Telecom Regulatory Authority of India (TRAI) as of December 2017.

== Controversies ==
=== 2G license controversy ===
Unitech Wireless was one of the would-be telecom companies that received 2G licenses in 2006. The method chosen by the authorities to allocate these licenses later became subject to controversy as part of the 2G license allocation case. Licenses were awarded through a first come-first served process, where eight companies belonging to the Unitech Group were awarded telecom licenses. The licenses obtained by the telecom arm of the Unitech Group were the basis for Telenor Group's investment into the joint venture. Unitech Wireless companies were later amalgamated into one company, Unitech Wireless (Tamil Nadu) Pvt. Ltd. The Telenor Group invested ₹61.35 billion through new shares to hold 67.25% majority stake in the company. This investment was used as working capital for the joint venture. Telenor's investments in Unitech Wireless was cleared at each stage by FIPB. Due to the controversy of the 2G license allocation case, Unitech Ltd.'s Managing Director Sanjay Chandra together with the company Unitech Wireless came under investigation by the Indian Central Bureau of Investigation (CBI). These investigations were connected to Unitech Wireless at a point when the company was fully owned by the Unitech Group. Subsequently, Unitech's Managing Director and the erstwhile chairman of the board of Unitech Wireless, Sanjay Chandra, together with individuals from other telecom operators were taken into custody in early 2011. He was released on bail, amid pendency of the case in Indian courts.

In February 2012, a special court consisting of two Supreme Court justices issued a judgment in a public interest litigation (PIL) case connected to the 2008 allocation of telecom circle licenses. The judgment directed the Indian telecom regulator, TRAI, to recommend a process for re-allocation of the 121 licenses that were issued in 2008. The court ordered this process to be concluded within four months, i.e. by June 2012. This deadline was later extended to September 2012 and then to January 2013. Uninor services and operations continues uninterrupted.

Telenor Group on 21 February 2012 also announced its intention to form a new entity in India with which its Indian operations will be taken forward. This new entity will serve as the platform to approach the upcoming auctions for fresh licenses as mandated by the Supreme Court. The new entity will also seek requisite approvals from the FIPB to allow Telenor Group to take up 74% ownership.

Uninor on 1 August 2012 said it would auction all of its telecom business before it becomes non-operational on 7 September, the deadline set by the apex court for winding up of operations of all the firms whose licences had been cancelled. The move was strongly opposed by the firm's minority stakeholder Unitech and it threatened to initiate legal action, if Uninor goes ahead with the auction. Telenor in August 2012 said it would buy out Unitech Wireless for "₹4,190 crore", if there are no bidders for the Indian mobile phone operator's assets. A settlement between the parties was made in October 2012 with Unitech Ltd. committing to dispose of all its shares in Unitech Wireless, which lead to the rebranding of the company as "Telenor India" in September 2015.

== Awards and recognition ==
Telenor India has won many recognitions and industry awards for its business practices and sustainability programs:

2016:

- Telenor Suraksha gets Efma award in the 'Best Disruptive Product or Service' category
- Telenor India's Free Life Insurance & Rebranding Campaign, Lean GSM and Project Sampark get 2016 Voice & Data Telecom Leadership Conference & Award

2015:

- Telenor's Project Sampark has been recognised with the Aegis Graham Bell Awards 2015
- Exchange4media IPRCC Awards 2015 under the CSR & Not-for-profit
- Telenor India five times winner of the Greentech Safety Award-August 2015
- Project Sampark wins award for excellence in CSR August 2015
- Greentech CSR Gold Award
- British Safety Council ISA
- Greentech Env. Gold Award
- BSC Global Sector Award
- Greentech Platinum Safety Award

2014:

- CII Star Award for Safety Management
- Greentech Gold Award for outstanding Achievement in Safety Management
- Greentech Environment Excellence Gold Award
- British Safety Council International Safety Award with Distinction
- British Safety Council Global Sector Award

2013:

- Greentech Gold Award for outstanding Achievement in Safety Management
- Greentech Environmental Excellence Gold Award
- British Safety Council International Safety award with Merit

2012:

- Greentech Gold Award for outstanding Achievement in Safety Management
- Greentech Environmental Excellence Gold Award
- British Safety Council International Safety Award with Merit

2011:

- Greentech Gold Award for outstanding Achievement in Safety Management

== See also ==
- Telenor Group
- Unitech Group
