= Tata Docomo =

Indian telecommunications company

TATA DOCOMO
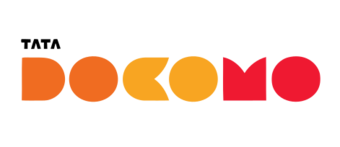
- Formerly: Tata Docomo
- Type: Subsidiary
- Industry: Telecommunications
- Founded: November 2008; 17 years ago
- Defunct: 1 July 2019; 7 years ago
- Fate: Acquired by Bharti Airtel
- Headquarters: Mumbai, Maharashtra, India
- Area served: India
- Products: Mobile telephony; Wireless Internet; Internet services
- Members: 20.04 million (March 2018)
- Number of employees: 5,015
- Parent: Bharti Airtel

Tata Docomo was an Indian mobile network operator, a wholly owned subsidiary of Tata Teleservices deriving its name from NTT Docomo who invested in the company in 2008. In October 2017, Bharti Airtel announced a merger deal with Tata Teleservices and the acquisition of Tata Docomo.

The consumer mobile businesses of Tata Docomo, Tata Teleservices (TTSL), and Tata Teleservices Maharashtra Limited (TTML) were merged into Bharti Airtel on 1 July 2019. As of 7 July 2019, all Tata Docomo users were migrated to Bharti Airtel's network and hence became Airtel users.

== History ==
Tata Docomo was part of the Indian conglomerate Tata Group. The company received the license to operate GSM services in nineteen telecom circles and was allotted spectrum in eighteen of these circles and launched GSM services on 24 June 2009. It began operations first in South India and had operated GSM services in eighteen of twenty-two telecom circles. It had licences to operate in Delhi but had not been allocated spectrum from the Government. Docomo provided services throughout India. Tata Docomo offered both prepaid and postpaid Mobile Phone services. It became very popular with its one-second pulse, especially in semi-urban and rural areas.

In November 2008, NTT Docomo invested ₹12,740 crore (equivalent to ₹350 billion or US$3.6 billion in 2026) in Tata Teleservices, at ₹117 (equivalent to ₹320 or US$3.30 in 2026) a share for a 26.5% stake in the latter. Docomo, TTSL and Tata Sons had in March 2009 signed shareholder agreement for the business alliance. In March 2009, Docomo acquired 27.31% of Tata Teleservices for Rs 12,924 crore and 20.25% in Tata Teleservices (Maharashtra) Ltd, the listed arm of TTSL, for ₹949 crore. Overall, Docomo held 26.5% in Tata Teleservices.

On 5 November 2010, Tata Docomo became the first private sector telecom company to launch 3G services in India. Tata Docomo had about 49 million users at the end of March 2017.

In April 2011, Tata Docomo signed Bollywood actor Ranbir Kapoor as its brand ambassador on a three-year contract. For the southern states of Tamil Nadu and Andhra Pradesh, actors Vijay and Ram Charan were the brand ambassadors respectively.

In October 2017, Bharti Airtel announced its acquisition of Tata Docomo having roughly 17 million subscribers.

=== Rebranding & Reformation ===
On 20 October 2011, the Tata Group brought its brands – Indicom (CDMA), Walky (Fixed Wireless Phone), and Photon INTERNET – under the Tata Docomo brand. All subscribers to these services were transited to Tata Docomo's network on 20 October 2011. In 2015, Virgin Mobile India also merged with Tata Docomo. T24 Mobile merged with Tata Docomo on 15 August 2018. All operations across India of said companies had merged into Tata Docomo's entity to form the second largest CDMA and GSM network in India.

=== NTT Docomo Exit ===
According to the agreement between the Tata Group and NTT Docomo, the latter had the right to sell its stake if Tata Docomo missed performance targets, with Tata getting the right of the first refusal. On 25 April 2014, NTT Docomo had announced that they would sell all of their shares in Tata Docomo and exit the Indian telecom industry as they had incurred a total loss of $1.3 billion. Under the joint venture agreement between the two groups, NTT Docomo would either increase its stake from 26.5% to 51% or sell all of its shares, depending on the performance of Tata Docomo in the Indian market.

Since Tata was unable to find a buyer for the shares, they sought the approval of the RBI, in November 2014, to buy back the shares from NTT Docomo for $1.1 billion (at ₹58.045 per share), half the price paid by them in 2009. The RBI had approved the deal in January 2015, but reversed their decision and rejected the deal in March 2015, citing FEMA regulations. Following the RBI decision, the Tata Group offered to purchase Docomo's stake at ₹23.34 a share on the basis of a fair market value determined on 30 June 2014 by PwC. NTT Docomo then moved the London Court of International Arbitration seeking a valuation of ₹58 a share.

On 28 February 2017, Tata and NTT Docomo resolved their dispute, after the former announced that it would pay the latter US$1.18 billion in exchange for NTT Docomo's shares in the joint venture. On 31-October, $1.27 billion was paid to NTT Docomo by Tata Sons, thus ending the dispute.

=== Acquisition by Bharti Airtel ===
On 12 October 2017, Bharti Airtel proposed a deal for the acquisition of Tata Group's Telecommunications including, Tata Teleservices and Tata Docomo. Tata Group made a deal with Airtel, to sell its assets in a debt-cash-free deal which will only include TTSL's spectrum liability. The Competition Commission of India (CCI) and the Department of Telecom (DoT) gave approval for Airtel to proceed with the deal.

== Network ==
=== 3G ===
On 19 May 2010, the 3G spectrum auction in India ended. Tata Teleservices paid ₹5,864.29 crores for spectrum in 10 circles. These circles obtained 3G licences and they are Madhya Pradesh & Chhattisgarh, Gujarat, Haryana, Karnataka, Kerala, Maharashtra & Goa, Punjab, and Uttar Pradesh (West).
