= Caspian American Telecom =

Caspian American Telecom LLC (CATEL) is an American Azerbaijan Mobile Telecommunications Joint venture between the Azerbaijan government and US consortium Omni Communications.

== History ==
CATEL was the third company in Azerbaijan (after state run Azerfon and Motorola owned Bakcell) to be granted a wireless communications license.

As of 2007 the company had 22,000 subscribers. The company invested $25 Million in 30 CDMA base stations during 2007
