= Kulpa, Astrakhan Oblast =

Kulpa Кульпа
- Settlement
- Location within Astrakhan Oblast Location within Russia
- Coordinates: 46°17′N 48°20′E
- Country: Russia
- Region: Astrakhan Oblast
- District: Privolzhsky District
- Time zone: UTC+4:00

Kulpa (Russian: Кульпа) is a rural locality (a settlement) in Biryukovsky Selsoviet, Privolzhsky District, Astrakhan Oblast, Russia. The population was 149 as of 2010. There are 3 streets.

== Geography ==
Kulpa is located 17 km southeast of Nachalovo (the district's administrative centre) by road. Akhterek is the nearest rural locality.
