= BSNL Mobile =

Indian central public sector undertaking

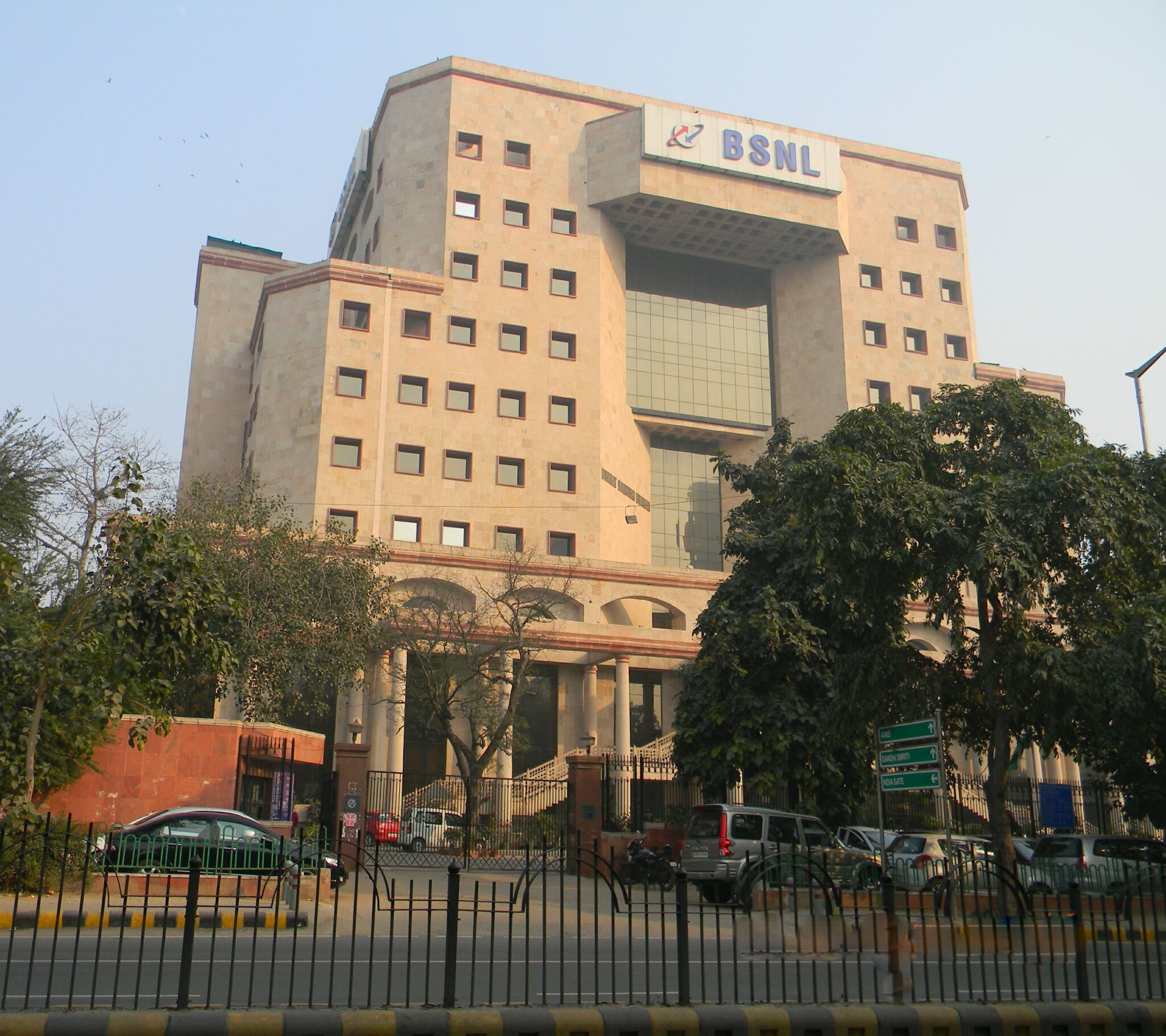
- BSNL Headquarters at New Delhi
- Type: Central Public Sector Undertaking
- Industry: Telecommunications
- Founded: 2 September 2002; 24 years ago
- Founder: Government of India
- Headquarters: New Delhi, India
- Area served: India; Nepal (as MTNL); Mauritius (as MTML)
- Key people: A. Robert J. Ravi, ITS (Chairman & MD)
- Services: FTTH; Fixed line telephone; Mobile telephony; Broadband; Internet services; Streaming television; IPTV
- Revenue: ▲₹23,427 crore (US$2.5 billion) (2025)
- Operating income: ▲₹20,841 crore (US$2.2 billion) (2025)
- Net income: ▲₹−2,247 crore (US$−240 million) (2025)
- Total assets: ▲₹167,086 crore (US$18 billion) (2024)
- Total equity: ▲₹106,626 crore (US$11 billion) (2024)
- Owner: Department of Telecommunications, Ministry of Communications, Government of India
- Members: ▲9.2 crore (91.95 million) (December 2024)
- Number of employees: 56,820 (as on 30 June 2024 as per RTI)
- Divisions: Bharat Fiber; BSNL Broadband; BSNL Mobile; Bharat Net; BSNL Towers
- Subsidiaries: Mahanagar Telephone Nigam Limited BBNL
- Website: bsnl.co.in

Bharat Sanchar Nigam Limited Mobile (commonly known as BSNL Mobile) is an Indian central public sector undertaking, under the ownership of Department of Telecommunications, which is part of the Ministry of Communications, Government of India with its headquarters in New Delhi, India. The central public sector undertaking was established on 1 September 2002 by the Government of India. Its highest official is designated as Chairperson and Managing Director, who is a central civil service group 'A' gazetted officer from Indian Communication Finance Service cadre or central engineering service group 'A' gazetted officer from Indian Telecommunication Service cadre. It provides mobile voice and internet services through its nationwide telecommunications network across India. It is the largest government-owned-wireless telecommunications service provider in India.

== History ==
Bharat Sanchar Nigam Limited (BSNL) was incorporated on 15 September 2000. It took over the business of providing telecom services and network management from the erstwhile Central Government Departments of Telecom Services (DTS) and Telecom Operations (DTO), with effect from 1 October 2000 on a going concern basis, in early days it was known as CellOne for GSM mobile services, CellOne for Postpaid services & Excel for Prepaid Services. BSNL's network (GSM/GPRS) was launched in late 2002 and in the year 2007, its consumer mobility business was renamed from CellOne to BSNL Mobile. It was the first company that made incoming roaming charges free across the country. BSNL has coverage in almost all major cities and each town and more places are being covered(especially under the 4G saturation project of GOI). BSNL Mobile offers GSM prepaid and postpaid services.

=== 3G ===
On 27 February 2010, BSNL Mobile launched 3G services on Pan India. BSNL Mobile also has 3G Roaming services in Mumbai and Delhi for other circles subscribers through an agreement with MTNL, this gives BSNL Mobile a 3G presence in all 22 circles in India.

=== 4G ===
On 27 September 2025, BSNL Mobile launched 4G services on pan India, Prime Minister Sri. Narendra Modi inaugurated Bharat Sanchar Nigam Limited's (BSNL) Swadeshi 4G network, developed entirely in India, which the government claims can seamlessly integrate with 5G in the future, will also commission over 97,500 mobile 4G towers spread across the country, built at a cost of ₹37,000 crore. BSNL Mobile has started providing 4G services in some telecom circles of India. As a part of a revival package promised by the Indian Government, BSNL is deploying 4G technology in its countrywide network using an indigenous 4G/5G stack developed by TCS & C-DoT led consortium. On 15 July 2023, BSNL launched its beta 4G services in Amritsar, Punjab, after successfully conducting a Proof of Concept (PoC) of the Indian 4G stack equipment across 200 live 4G network sites in Firozpur, Pathankot, Bathinda and Amritsar in India.

=== VoLTE & HD Calling ===
BSNL is launching 4G technology with VoLTE (HD Call) with VoWIFI support starting from the city of Punjab and Jammu & Kashmir in India.

=== 5G ===
BSNL Mobile is expected to start 5G (NR) services soon.

=== VoNR ===
Currently, BSNL is working with its vendor partner to come up with 5G in NSA (non-standalone) mode then BSNL will migrate towards 5G in SA (standalone) mode.

=== VoWiFi ===
BSNL launched Voice over WiFi (VoWiFi) services nationwide across all telecom circles on 1 January 2026 ahead of 5G rollout, enabling calls and messages over WiFi using existing mobile number. The free, IMS-based service ensures connectivity in low-signal areas.

== Spectrum frequency holding summary ==
BSNL owns spectrum in 700 MHz, 850 MHz, 900 MHz, 1800 MHz, 2100 MHz and 2500 MHz, 3300 MHz and 26 GHz bands across the country.

Telecom circle coverage	FD-NR/LTE 700MHz Band n28/Band 28	FD-LTE 850MHz Band 5	E-GSM 900MHz Band 8	GSM / FD-LTE 1800MHz Band 3	UMTS / FD-LTE 2100MHz Band 1	TD-LTE 2500MHz Band 41	TD-NR 3300MHz Band n78	TD-NR 26GHz Band n258
Andhra Pradesh & Telangana	Yes	No	Yes	No	Yes	Yes	Yes	Yes
Gujarat	Yes	No	Yes	No	Yes	Yes	Yes	Yes
Karnataka	Yes	No	Yes	No	Yes	Yes	Yes	Yes
Maharashtra & Goa	Yes	No	Yes	No	Yes	Yes	Yes	Yes
Tamil Nadu	Yes	No	Yes	Yes	Yes	Yes	Yes	Yes
Haryana	Yes	No	Yes	No	Yes	Yes	Yes	Yes
Kerala	Yes	No	Yes	Yes	Yes	Yes	Yes	Yes
Kolkata	Yes	No	Yes	No	Yes	Yes	Yes	Yes
Madhya Pradesh & Chhattisgarh	Yes	No	Yes	No	Yes	Yes	Yes	Yes
Punjab	Yes	No	Yes	No	Yes	Yes	Yes	Yes
Rajasthan	Yes	Yes	Yes	No	Yes	Yes	Yes	Yes
Uttar Pradesh (East)	Yes	No	Yes	No	Yes	Yes	Yes	Yes
Uttar Pradesh (West)	Yes	No	Yes	No	Yes	Yes	Yes	Yes
West Bengal	Yes	No	Yes	No	Yes	Yes	Yes	Yes
Assam	Yes	No	Yes	No	Yes	Yes	Yes	Yes
Bihar & Jharkhand	Yes	No	Yes	No	Yes	Yes	Yes	Yes
Himachal Pradesh	Yes	No	Yes	No	Yes	Yes	Yes	Yes
Jammu and Kashmir & Ladakh	Yes	No	Yes	No	Yes	Yes	Yes	Yes
North East	Yes	No	Yes	No	Yes	Yes	Yes	Yes
Odisha	Yes	No	Yes	Yes	Yes	Yes	Yes	Yes
Mumbai	Yes	No	Yes	No	Yes	Yes	Yes	Yes
Delhi	Yes	No	Yes	Yes	Yes	Yes	Yes	Yes

== See also ==
- List of mobile network operators
