= Kulpa, Balaghat district =

Kulpa
- Village
- Location within Madhya Pradesh Location within India
- Coordinates: 21.385°N 80.418°E
- Country: India
- State: Madhya Pradesh
- District: Balaghat

Government
  - Type: Gram Panchayat

Languages

Kulpa is a village and Gram-panchayat in Lanji block of Balaghat district in Madhya pradesh. Kulpa is situated in the border of two states (Madhya pradesh and Maharashtra). Kulpa is 25 km from sub-district headquarters and 84 km from District headquarters.
