= EVNTelecom =

- Industry: Mobile telecommunications
- Headquarters: Hanoi, Vietnam
- Products: Mobile networks, Telecom services
- Number of employees: approx. 3000
- Parent: Viettel
- Website: www.evntelecom.com.vn

EVNTelecom was a Vietnamese telecommunications company. It was set up as a 100% state-owned and self-financed subsidiary of Vietnam Electricity Group (EVN). It was one of five mobile network providers in Vietnam, and the fourth to launch its service.

EVNTelecom has been merged into Viettel following a decision in December 2011.
