= National Cyber Coordination Centre =

Indian cyber security and e-surveillance agency

Agency overview
- Jurisdiction: Government of India
- Agency executive: Lt Gen M U Nair, National Cyber Security Coordinator
- Parent department: Ministry of Electronics and Information Technology (India)

The National Cyber Coordination Centre (NCCC) is an operational cybersecurity and e-surveillance agency in India. It is intended to screen communication metadata and co-ordinate the intelligence gathering activities of other agencies. Some have expressed concern that the body could encroach on Indian citizens' privacy and civil-liberties, given the lack of explicit privacy laws in the country.

== Motivation ==
India had no dedicated Cyber-security regulation and was also not well prepared to deal with cyberwarfare prior to 2013. However, India has formulated the National Cyber Security Policy 2013 which has been implemented. The National Cyber Coordination Centre's purpose would be to help the country deal with malicious cyber-activities by acting as an Internet traffic monitoring entity that can fend off domestic or international attacks.

Components of the NCCC include a cybercrime prevention strategy, cybercrime investigation training and review of outdated laws.

== Background ==
The NCCC is an e-surveillance and cybersecurity project of Government of India. It has been classified to be a project of Indian government without a legal framework, which may be counterproductive as it may violate civil liberties and human rights.

There were concerns that National Cyber Coordination Centre (NCCC) could possibly be abused for indulging in mass surveillance in India, privacy violation and civil liberty violations as agencies like NTRO and organisations like the National Security Council Secretariat are exempted from the applicability of any transparency law like Right to Information Act. Mass surveillance in India is not new as India already has e-surveillance projects like Central Monitoring System, NATGRID, and DRDO NETRA.

Many, including legal experts, in India believe that intelligence agencies and their e-surveillance projects require parliamentary oversight. Although NCCC is jurisdictionally under the Ministry of Home Affairs, it coordinates with multiple security and surveillance agencies as well as with CERT-In of the Ministry of Electronics and Information Technology.

== Status ==
The National Cyber Coordination Centre received an in principle approval in May 2013 and would come under the National Information Board. In September 2014, Indian government discussed to establish it. In November 2014 Rs. 1,000 crore has been allotted to improve Indian cybersecurity. From this Rs. 800 crore would be utilised for National Cyber Coordination Centre purposes.

On 9 August, in response to a question, minister of State P.P. Chaudhary mentioned that Phase-1 of the National Cyber Coordination Centre is now operational. Indian and U.S. intelligence agencies are also working together to curb misuse of social media platforms in the virtual world by terror groups.

== Functions ==
Government sources mentioned that the government would also involve Internet service providers (ISPs) to ensure round-the-clock monitoring of the Internet, while expertise of other private sector organisations would be utilised when required. It will be India’s first layer for cyber threat monitoring and all communication with government and private service providers would be through this body only. The NCCC will be in virtual contact with the control room of all ISPs to scan traffic within the country, flowing at the point of entry and exit, including international gateway. Apart from monitoring the Internet, the NCCC would look into various threats posed by cyber attacks. The NCCC would also address the threats faced by the computer networks of government departments and organisations handling sensitive government data and important websites.

== National Cyber Security Coordinator ==
The first National Cyber Security Coordinator/ Cyber-security chief was Dr. Gulshan Rai. He was followed by Lt. Gen. Rajesh Pant (Retd). Currently it is held by Lt Gen MU Nair.

== Similar projects ==
Projects similar in nature:

- Aadhaar
- Central Monitoring System
- NATGRID
- Netra
