= VTM =

VTM may refer to:

- Nevatim Airbase (IATA code: VTM), an Israeli Air Force base located southeast of Be'er Sheva, near moshav Nevatim
- Telecom Enforcement Resource and Monitoring (previously Vigilance Telecom Monitoring), the vigilance and monitoring wing of the Indian Department of Telecommunications
- Vampire: The Masquerade, a series of games including both tabletop and video games
- Variable Torque Management, a redesigned four-wheel-drive transmission designed by Honda Advanced Technology
- Vetapalem railway station (station code: VTM), Andhra Pradesh, India
- Victor Talking Machine Company
- Viral transport medium, a substance used to preserve and transport virus samples
- VTM (TV channel), or Vlaamse Televisie Maatschappij, the main commercial television station in Flanders
- VVC Test Model; see Versatile Video Coding, a proposed video compression standard
