= State Wide Area Network =

Part of Indian e-governance plan

A State Wide Area Network (SWAN) is one of the core infrastructure components under the National e-Governance Plan of the Government of India. The main purpose of this network is to create a dedicated Closed User Group (CUG) network and provide a secured and high speed connectivity for Government functioning and connecting State Headquarters, District Headquarters, Blocks Headquarters. The SWAN project, which forms a strategic component of the National eGovernance Plan, was approved in March 2005.

== Introduction ==
SWAN is an approved scheme of Department of IT of Government of India claimed to bring speed, efficiency, reliability and accountability of Government-to-government functions. It is one of the core infrastructure components under NeGP and was planned as a converged backbone network for voice, video and data communications across each of the 29 States and 6 Union Territories. Common Service Centers (CSC) schemes would serve as the end delivery points. The Department of Information Technology, Government of India, is the nodal department for each SWAN implementation. The scheme was a “centralized initiative with decentralized implementation”. SWANs across the country are expected to cover at least 50000 departmental offices through 1 million (10 lacs) route kilometers of communication links.

== Objectives ==
- The SWAN aims to create a dedicated closed user group (CUG) network of minimum speed of 2 Mbit/s by connecting around 7500 points of presence (PoPs), providing data, voice & Video connectivity to more than 50,000 government offices.
- Efficient Delivery : The network aims at increasing the efficiency of the government delivery mechanism and optimize the performance.
- Reliable Connectivity: SWAN would provide reliable, vertical and horizontal connectivity within the State / UT administration and would facilitate electronic transactions between all the government departments.

To ensure desired quality of service (QoS) by the network operator and the bandwidth service provider, a third party audit (TPA) mechanism monitors the performance of each SWAN. The third party audit agency performs for five years from the date of final acceptance test of the network and primarily monitor the compliance of the service-level agreement (SLA) which the State / UT would enter with the Network Operator and also with the Bandwidth Service Provider.

== History ==
=== Andhra Pradesh State Wide Area Network ===
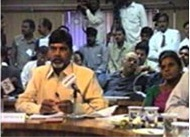
APSWAN Video Conference

First statewide network in the country APSWAN providing Voice, Video and Data services thereby enabling video-conferencing between the then united A.P. Chief Minister N. Chandrababu Naidu and others in the Capital with district officials was conceived and implemented in 1999.

This was executed under BOOT Model with the duration of 5+ years by United Telecoms Limited in a record time. The Network connected the united Andhra Pradesh State Secretariat at Hyderabad with the Other Government offices across the state using leased lines.

The project was taken up by the Chandrababu Naidu government as part of Vision 2020, initiated by him in an effort to bringing in transparency and accountability in state administration.

=== Gujarat State Wide Area Network ===
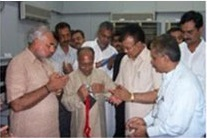
Narendra Modi at GSWAN

The GSWAN is the first end-to-end IP network and the largest network in the Asia Pacific region at the time of its implementation in the year 2001-02. This connects the State Secretariat in Gandhinagar, the Capital of Gujarat, with other Government offices across the state on Leased Lines.

In its first phase, 25 district headquarters and 225 Talukas were connected through a huge network of optical fiber cables to the Sachivalaya and even to ministers' residences at Gandhinagar, the state capital.

The then Chief Minister of Gujarat Narendra Modi said "Gujarat will ride GSWAN", during his inaugural speech at the Communication & Information Technology (CIT), Ahmedabad.

=== Jharkhand State Wide Area Network ===
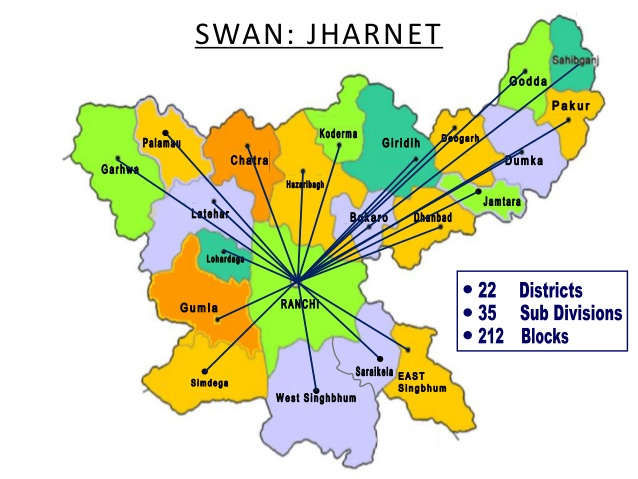
JharNet connectivity

JharNet (JharNet) is one of the largest e-governance network in South East Asia with 90% horizontal offices connected through optical fiber and wireless. United Telecoms Limited has implemented the State Wide Area Network project where the Government offices in the districts, Sub Divisional Headquarters and the Blocks are networked with the State Headquarters at Ranchi for providing Voice, Video and Data Services. JharNet made extensive use of Wireless Network as well as Optical fiber to connect to remote office apart from the traditional Leased Lines.

=== Kerala State Wide Area Network ===
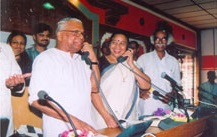
Kerala SWAN Inauguration

For Departments like the Revenue, Registration, Rural Development, Food and Civil Supplies Department, Police etc., Kerala SWAN provides advantages like high degree of citizen interaction. In Departments like Taxes and Treasury, the revenue augmentation will be enormous.

=== Goa Broad Band Network ===
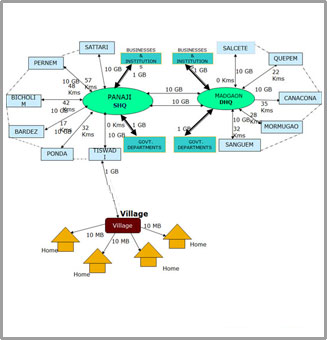
GBBN Network

GBBN is the Next-generation network (NGN) project, which is unique and the first of its kind in India. This is also the first fully fiber based network in the country. GBBN, the Gigabit scale Next Generation Network convergence is a Quadruple play providing convergence of Broadband, Telephony, Data and Television. GBBN also involves deployment of most modern networking technologies like Gigabit Passive optical network (GPON), Fiber-to-Home (FTTH) and Fiber-to-Business (FTTB) technologies.

== Architecture ==
The SWAN is required to be an open standards based, scalable, high capacity network to carry voice, data and video traffic between the designated State Government offices at the State, district and sub division / block levels. The connectivity to the end-user is based on either one or more of the standard technologies such as leased circuits, VSAT, radio frequency dial-up circuits or using appropriate Ethernet ports for the individual offices. The network would have single point gateways of adequate capacity connected to the Internet. The entire SWAN architecture is logically divided into two components.

=== Vertical component ===
The vertical component of SWAN is implemented using multi-tier architecture (typically, three-tier) with the State/UT Headquarters (SHQ ) connected to the each District Headquarters (DHQ) which in turn gets connected to the each Block Headquarters (BHQ).

- Primary Tier consisting of SHQ
- Secondary Tier consisting of DHQs
- Tertiary Tier consisting of SDHQs/BHQs

=== Horizontal component ===
The Horizontal component of SWAN is composed of horizontal offices spread across the State. All vertical PoPs of SWAN will have various Horizontal connectivity. In horizontal component, the government departments at each tier are connected to the respective PoPs.

== Implementation ==
There are two options to the State Governments for State Wide Area Network establishment. The first option is the public–private partnership (PPP) model for operation and maintenance of the Network. In the PPP model State/UT identifies a suitable PPP model and selects an appropriate Network Operator agency through a suitable competitive bid process. The second option is designating National Informatics Centre (NIC) as the prime implementation agency for the SWAN as an integral part of NICNET. In the NIC model the State / UT designates NIC as the prime implementation agency for SWAN for establishment, operation and maintenance of the Network. NIC in turn would identify a Facility Management Service (FMS) agency for the State / UT concerned, to manage day-to-day management and operation of the network. Department of IT support covers the entire cost of establishment, operation and maintenance of the SWAN for a period of five years on 100% grant basis. A majority of the States / UTs have opted for the PPP model. Bharat Sanchar Nigam Limited has been identified as a preferred bandwidth service provider for SWANs.

== Additional SWAN ==
- Madhya Pradesh State Wide Area Network
