= NATGRID =

Indian intelligence database

The National Intelligence Grid or NATGRID is an integrated intelligence master database structure for counter-terrorism purposes which connects databases of various core security agencies under the Government of India. It collects and analyses comprehensive patterns procured from 21 different organizations that can be readily accessed by security agencies round the clock. As of September 2025 its CEO is Hirdesh Kumar.

NATGRID came into existence after the 2008 Mumbai attacks. The Government of India in July 2016 appointed Ashok Patnaik as the Chief Executive Officer (CEO) of NATGRID. The appointment is being seen as the government's effort to revive the project. Patnaik's appointment was valid till 31 December 2018. As of 2019, NATGRID is headed by an Indian Police Service (IPS) officer Ashish Gupta. The Ministry of Home Affairs on 5 February 2020 announced in Parliament that Project NATGRID with all its required physical infrastructures been completed as of 31 March 2020 and the NATGRID solution went live as of 31 December 2020.

== Reason for establishment ==
The landscape of Terrorism in India and the subsequent response by Law enforcement in India have necessitated a sophisticated data-integration framework, positioning NATGRID as a vital tool for national security agencies. This shift towards Mass surveillance in India is rooted in a broader policy evolution of state monitoring, which is technologically enabled by the India Stack—the foundational digital infrastructure providing the API-based backbone for government service delivery and identity verification. This ecosystem is further bolstered by advanced Signal intelligence capabilities and the implementation of SIM binding, a security protocol that anchors a user’s digital identity to a specific mobile device and verified SIM card to prevent identity fraud and unauthorized access. Collectively, these elements form a 360-degree surveillance and authentication grid designed to preemptively identify threats by synthesizing historical, financial, and real-time communication data across disparate platforms.

=== Terror attacks in India ===
The 2008 Mumbai attacks led to the exposure of several weaknesses in India's intelligence gathering and action networks. NATGRID is part of the radical overhaul of the security and intelligence apparatuses of India that was mooted by the then Home Minister P. Chidambaram in 2009. The National Investigation Agency (NIA) and the National Counter Terrorism Centre (NCTC) are two organisations established in the aftermath of the Mumbai attacks of 2008. Before the Mumbai attacks, a Pakistani origin American Lashkar-e-Taiba (LeT) operative David Coleman Headley had visited India several times and done a recce of the places that came under attack on 26/11. Despite having travelled to India several times and having returned to the US through Pakistan or West Asia, his trips failed to raise the suspicion of Indian agencies as they lacked a system that could reveal a pattern in his unusual travel itineraries and trips to the country. It was argued that if they had a system like the NATGRID in place, Headley would have been apprehended well before the attacks.

=== Need for the integrated intelligence system ===
During the inauguration of NATGRID campus in Bengaluru, the Minister of Home Affairs, Amit Shah stated that a new national database is in the process of being made which will bring a change in the current ways of functioning of agencies once it's ready also adding that the government has entrusted the task of developing and operating a state-of-the-art and innovative technology system. It is accessible to 11 central agencies in the first phase and in later phases will be made accessible to police of all States and Union Territories and only authorized personnel are allowed access to the platform on a case-to-case basis for investigations into suspected cases of terrorism. NATGRID has a total fund allocation of ₹3,400 crore (US$353 million).

== Legal framework ==
Relevant legal framework:

- Digital Personal Data Protection Act, 2023 – The legislative framework governing how digital data is handled.
- Information Technology Act - Interception Rules, 2002 – The specific regulations under the Information Technology Act that govern these agencies.
- National Security Act of 1980, evidence-based preventative detention of suspects
- Right to Information Act, 2005, for obtaining information from the government and used by activists and whistleblowers

== Structure and functions ==
=== Multi-agency integrated intelligence database ===
NATGRID is an intelligence sharing network that collates data from the standalone databases of the various agencies and ministries of the Indian government. It is a counter terrorism measure that collects and collates a host of information from government databases including tax and bank account details, credit/debit card transactions, visa and immigration records and itineraries of rail and air travel. It also has access to the Crime and Criminal Tracking Network and Systems, a database that links crime information, including First Information Reports, across 14,000 police stations in India. This combined data will be made available to 11 central agencies, which are: the Research and Analysis Wing (R&AW), Intelligence Bureau (IB), National Investigation Agency (NIA), Central Bureau of Investigation (CBI), Narcotics Control Bureau (NCB), Financial Intelligence Unit (India) (FIU), Enforcement Directorate (ED), Central Board of Direct Taxes (CBDT), Central Board of Indirect Taxes and Customs (CBIC), Directorate of Revenue Intelligence (DRI) and Directorate General of GST Intelligence. Also as stated by the MHA, NATGRID will have an in-built mechanism for continuous upgradation. In the later phases of NATGRID integration, the central government further plans to integrate 950 additional organizations into it.

=== Key components and users ===
==== Some important backend data feeds to the NATGRID (middleware) ====
- National Crime Records Bureau's Crime and Criminal Tracking Network and Systems (CCTNS) national-integrated law-and-order database for the state-level police forces: CCTNS is a mission-mode project under the National e-Governance Plan that interconnects over 15,000 police stations across India. It serves as the primary source for NATGRID to access digitized FIR (First Information Report) data and criminal history records from state-level law enforcement.
- NSA's National Technical Research Organisation (NTRO) national security-based database feed to NATGRID: NTRO serves as a primary technical data provider to NATGRID, offering specialized intercepts and satellite imagery. While NATGRID functions as a centralized data-integration middleware under the Ministry of Home Affairs, NTRO reports to the National Security Advisor within the Prime Minister's Office.
- DRDO's NETRA (Network Traffic Analysis) ELINT-based mass surveillance system for monitor internal internet traffic for keywords related to terrorism and criminal activity within Indian borders: Developed by the Centre for Artificial Intelligence and Robotics (CAIR), NETRA is an internet monitoring system capable of scanning traffic for specific trigger words. It provides digital behavioral triggers that NATGRID can cross-reference against structural data like financial or travel records. NETRA is a massive software network used to intercept and analyze internet traffic (emails, social media, blogs) for keywords like "bomb," "attack," or "kill." The intelligence gathered by NETRA regarding suspicious digital patterns or "keyword hits" can be fed into NATGRID. This allows an investigator to see if a person flagged by NETRA also has suspicious travel (from airline databases) or financial records (from bank databases) linked within NATGRID.
- Department of Telecommunications (DoT's Central Monitoring System (CMS) for lawfully intercepting national and international telecomm data: CMS is the centralized system for lawful interception of all telecommunications (phone calls, SMS, and data) in India, managed by the Department of Telecommunications (DoT). While CMS focuses on the content and metadata of real-time communication, NATGRID focuses on historical/structural data (tax, travel, identity). They represent two halves of a 360-degree surveillance profile: CMS listens to what a suspect says, while NATGRID tracks where they go and what they own. The CMS allows for the lawful interception of telecommunications metadata and content in real-time. In the broader surveillance architecture, CMS provides the "active" communication profile while NATGRID provides the "static" historical profile.
- Telecom Enforcement Resource and Monitoring (TERM) - Telecomm Regulatory & Verification Node for telecomm KYC: TERM cells verify subscriber identity (KYC) and maintain the integrity of telecom databases. NATGRID relies on these audited records to ensure the accuracy of telephone-to-identity mapping. TERM cells are the technical arms of the DoT. Their role includes verifying Subscriber Identity Modules (SIM) and checking the radiation of mobile towers. NATGRID pulls "Telecom KYC" data. TERM ensures the integrity of the databases that NATGRID queries. When NATGRID needs to verify who a phone number actually belongs to, it relies on the records and audits maintained by TERM.

==== Important end-user agencies ====
As of 2026, there were at least 10 authorised end-user agencies.

  - Multi Agency Centre (India) (MAC) - Operational Overarching Multi-agency Counterpart that takes actions based on NATGRID intelligence: The MAC is a multi-agency platform where representatives from various security agencies (IB, R&AW, State Police) physically or digitally meet to share intelligence "inputs" in real-time. MAC is for sharing human and signal intelligence (e.g., "A source says a suspicious boat is approaching"). NATGRID is for searching structured databases (e.g., "Check if any passengers on that boat have bank accounts in Mumbai"). Essentially, MAC is the intelligence-sharing forum, while NATGRID is the data-retrieval tool those members use to verify the intelligence shared at the MAC.
  - India's National Security Advisor (NSA) for overall internal and external national security.
  - Intelligence Bureau (IB) as manager of MAC and one of the primary user of NATGRID for internal national security: The Intelligence Bureau manages the MAC and is a primary "user agency" of NATGRID. It bridges the gap between raw data retrieval (NATGRID) and actionable field operations.
  - Research and Analysis Wing (R&AW) - India's primary foreign intelligence agency: R&AW is one of the authorized "user agencies" permitted to access the NATGRID database. While R&AW focuses on external threats, its access to NATGRID allows for the cross-referencing of international intelligence with domestic travel and financial footprints.
  - Defence Intelligence Agency (DIA) and Military Intelligence for military defence of India: The DIA coordinates intelligence across the Army, Navy, and Air Force. Its integration with NATGRID ensures that unified military intelligence can be synthesized with civilian data (such as immigration or PAN records) to identify hybrid threats or infiltrations along border regions.

=== Phased ever-expanding capability ===
NATGRID is being implemented in four different phases. The United Progressive Alliance (UPA) government gave clearance of ₹3,400 crores for the project. The Cabinet Committee on Security approved the initial two phases in 2011 which were operational by 2014 at a cost of ₹1,200 crores, with 10 user agencies and 21 service providers were connected while the first data sets retrievable from early 2013. Retired Captain P. Raghu Raman on 1 December 2009 was appointed as the Secretary and CEO for NATGRID and tasked with the establishment of the grid. His term ended on 31 May 2014. The implementation of the third and fourth phases are expected to require amendments to several laws to allow for the sharing and transfer of data on items such as property and bank transaction details and internet usage. The data recovery center for NATGRID is in Bengaluru.

NATGRID and the Income Tax Department signed a memorandum of understanding in 2017 to obtain bulk data, including Permanent Account Number, the taxpayer's name, and all the personal information it records, such as the father's name, gender, date of birth, photo, signature, or thumb impression. All of the taxpayers' residential and office addresses, communication addresses, email addresses, phone numbers, and mobile numbers that are stored in the department's database will be shared. To ensure the security of the transfer of personal data, the MoU contains a confidentiality clause.

=== Predictive and preemptive capabilities ===
Unlike the NIA which are central agencies, the NATGRID is essentially a tool that enables security agencies to locate and obtain relevant information on terror suspects from pooled data sets of various organizations and services in the country. It will help identify, capture and prosecute terrorists and help pre-empt terror plots. In order to obtain access to the Crime and Criminal Tracking Network and Systems (CCTNS) database, which connects over 14,000 police stations throughout India, NATGRID and the National Crime Records Bureau signed MoU in 2020. All FIRs must be registered on the CCTNS portal by State police.

=== Comprehensive extent - massive 360-degree view of almost all adults in India ===
The National Population Register, which contains the family-level information of 119 crore Indian citizens, was connected to NATGRID in December 2025, enabling safe data exchange between NIA and Anti-Terrorism Squad, the MHA informed Lok Sabha. Earlier in 2024, NATGRID had the most facial data, with over 100 crore (1 billion) entries which rose to 119 crore in 2025, or over 82% of India's total population. Data collected during the Covid-19 pandemic, even while people were wearing masks, is included in the facial entries. Within minutes, NATGRID can access and match masked faces. According to The Hindu, police and investigative agencies submit over 45,000 queries to the system each month. State authorities have been asked by the MHA to use the platform to access datasets that include information about driving licenses, Aadhaar registrations, airline information, bank records, and social media accounts that publish posts about a specific topic. Superintendent of police (SP) rank officers are also granted access to NATGRID.

=== Analytics module OCND (Organised Crime Network Database) ===
The OCND is an AI-enabled database that works similarly to ChatGPT and is intended as an intelligent analytics tool that gives law enforcement fast access to detailed information about organized crime and terrorism networks. The database provides investigating agencies with real-time access to FIRs, chargesheets, dossiers, and other information pertaining to crimes from every Indian state. The NATGRID and state police forces worked closely with the NIA to build the OCND. In addition to profile data, OCND has fingerprint data and voice matching capabilities. MHA established OCND on 26 December 2025. The database was launched by Union Home Minister Amit Shah at Anti-Terror Conference in Delhi.

=== Gandiva-AI with comprehensive 360-degree integrated data access ===
Gandiva and other improved NATGRID technologies will facilitate the gathering and analysis of data from multiple sources. The portal will provide access to suspect's or person of interest's family members' details, if they are available in NPR. Gandiva can be applied to entity resolution and facial recognition. It is an AI driven advanced analytics tool & is expected to enable better method of searching, analysing and connecting data.

Gandiva can be fed a suspect image. It can supply the information, saving an investigator's time and resources, if the photo matches any identity document, such as telecom KYC, a car registration, or a driver's license. An investigator's inquiries fall into one of three categories: very sensitive, sensitive, or non-sensitive. Highly sensitive information includes bank statements, financial transactions, tax information, and export-import data. Driving license, vehicle registration, Aadhaar, airline, bank, FASTag, passport, and travel details of Indians and foreigners, suspicious transaction reports from the FIU, train passengers, and data extraction and analysis from social media posts are just a few of the datasets that can be accessed on this platform.

== Opposition ==
NATGRID faced opposition on charges of possible violations of privacy and leakage of confidential personal information. Earlier, while it was still in infancy in phase-1 implementation prior to 2012, its efficacy in preventing terror was also questioned that at that time no state agency or police force yet had access to its database until the implementation of its 2nd phase thus reducing chances of immediate, effective action. NATGRID dispelled the issues with clarification that it has several structural and procedural safeguards and oversight mechanisms to mitigate privacy and other concerns, which include the external audits and technology safeguards.

== See also ==
- Indian Armed Forces
- Law enforcement in India
