= National Integrated Directory Inquiry Service =

NIDQS (National Integrated Directory Inquiry Service) is a national directory of telephone numbers in India. It was approved by the Department of Telecommunications on July 27, 2009, and is currently in development. The approval came despite years of opposition from telecom companies.

The directory will be available to anyone who calls a special five-digit number and via the Internet. It will not be made available in print form. All land line numbers will be included in the directory by default, with people having the option to opt out if they so choose. Mobile phone subscribers, however, will have to opt in to be included. As of May 2009, India has an estimated 38 million land line customers and 435 million mobile phone subscribers.

The service will be administered by one yet to be determined company. The Department of Telecommunications is planning on auctioning off the right to be that company. The auction winner will pay the government 1% of their revenue generated from the service.
