= Nasopharyngeal swab =

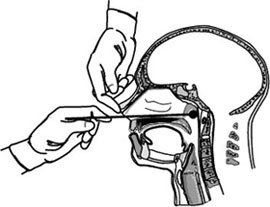
- Nasopharyngeal swab
- Purpose: Diagnosis of certain viral infections
- MedlinePlus: 003747

A nasopharyngeal swab is a device used for collecting a sample of nasal secretions from the back of the nose and throat. The sample is then analyzed for the presence of organisms or other clinical markers for disease. This diagnostic method is commonly used in suspected cases of whooping cough, diphtheria, influenza, and various types of diseases caused by the coronavirus family of viruses, including SARS, MERS, and COVID-19.

== Procedure ==
Video- Collecting a nasopharyngeal swab

To collect the sample, the swab is inserted in the nostril and gently moved forward into the nasopharynx, a region of the pharynx that covers the roof of the mouth. The swab is then rotated for a specified period of time to collect secretions, then the swab is removed and placed into a sterile viral transport media, which preserves the sample for the subsequent analysis.

== Material composition of swab ==
Similar in concept to the cotton swab, a swab used for nasopharyngeal collection constitutes a narrow stick made of a short plastic rod that is covered, at one tip, with adsorbing material such as cotton, polyester, or flocked nylon. (Some swab handles have been made of nichrome or stainless steel wire.) The swab material used for a particular diagnostic application may vary based on the test type. Some research has shown that flocked swabs collect a larger volume of the sample material, when compared to fiber swabs.

== Related methods ==
Slightly different but related is nasopharyngeal aspiration. Rather than depending on a physical swab to catch material from the nasopharynx, aspiration uses a catheter that is attached to a syringe. As with the swab method, the catheter is placed into the nostril and gently advanced to the nasopharynx, where approximately one to three milliliters of saline are introduced, followed by immediate re-aspiration of the saline—along with cells and secretions—back into the syringe. This aspiration method is often used when 1. the patient is an infant or elderly and 2. when the method is indicated as effective for a test type.

== Diagrams ==
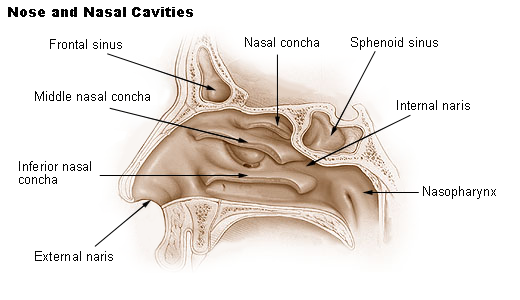
Diagram of the nasal cavity

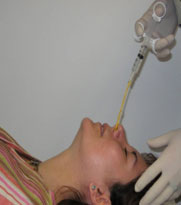
Nasopharyngeal aspiration

Collecting nasopharyngeal aspirate

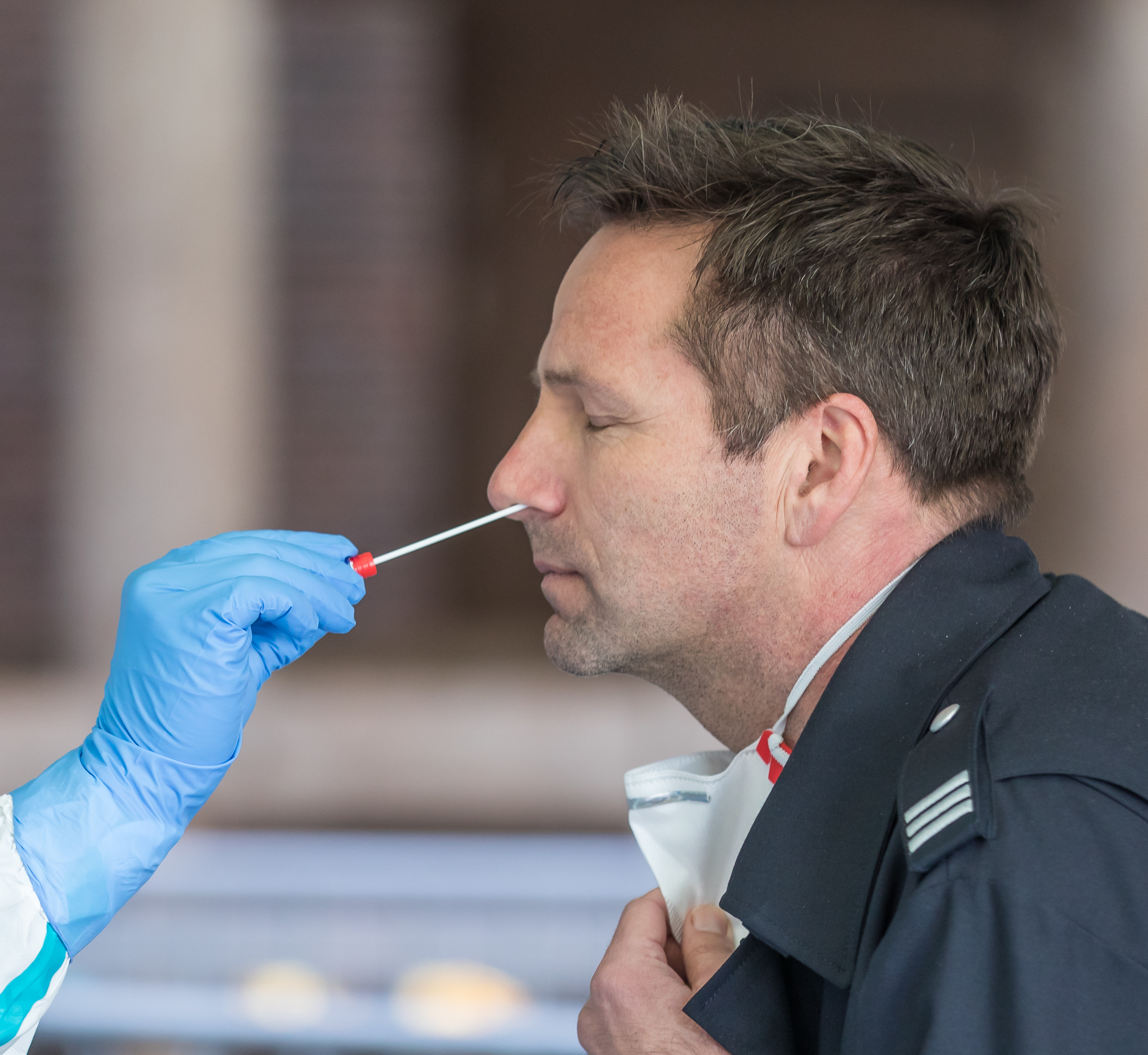

Video of a nasopharyngeal swab test for COVID-19

== See also ==
- Laboratory diagnosis of viral infections
