= Mass surveillance in India =

Mass surveillance is the pervasive surveillance of an entire or a substantial fraction of a population. Mass surveillance in India includes surveillance, telephone tapping, open-source intelligence, lawful interception, and surveillance under Indian Telegraph Act, 1885.

In recent years, India has seen use of facial-recognition technology by the law enforcement. Telangana is the most surveilled state in India with 36 CCTV cameras per 1,000 people, while cities Delhi and Chennai have more cameras per square mile than cities in China.

== History ==
=== Colonial India ===
==== Police surveillance ====
Police in colonial India developed surveillance tactics as a form of preventive policing believing that a substantial portion of crime was being committed by those who were or were suspected to be repeat offenders. Higher ranking police officials would go through criminal records to identify those who were to be surveilled by the constabulary, to this end history sheets or "bad character rolls" were maintained on such individuals. These surveillance practices also depended on local district superintendents and could be outside legislative sanction as they were allowed to develop their own policing practices by the Police Act of 1861. This reliance on surveillance was seen necessary owing to the police force being minimally staffed and relying on indirect power following the 1857 rebellion.

==== Indian Telegraph Act 1885 ====
The section 5 of the Indian Telegraph Act allowed the Governor General or a local government to temporarily seize any licensed telegraph, and also gave them the ability block, intercept, detain, or even disclose the contents of any message transmitted during a "public emergency" or in "interest of public safety", the Secretary to the Government had a final say on whether something met those two criteria. This act is one of the principal laws allowing surveillance of electronic communication in modern India.

== Use of surveillance technology ==
=== CCTV cameras ===
Indian cities like Hyderabad, Bangalore, Indore, Chennai and Delhi, have some of the highest levels of CCTV surveillance in the world after those in China with independent estimates ranging from 30-80 cameras per 1,000 people.

As of June 2023, Comparitech estimates the CCTV density as 83.32 cameras/1000 people in Hyderabad, 60 cameras/1000 people in Indore, and 19.96 cameras/1000 people in Delhi listing them among the world's most surveilled cities behind Chinese cities. The four cities - Hyderabad, Delhi, Chennai, and Indore accounting for 91% of CCTV cameras installed in the country, though newer and older cities are also coming under the surveillance radars. Delhi Police invoked Section 144 to issue orders directing private parties like ATMs, Banks, girls PG/hostels, liquor vendors and owners of parking lots, to install CCTV cameras for surveillance purposes which has been criticized as misuse.

=== Facial recognition and AI-based surveillance ===
Police forces in India have been using Facial Recognition software to identify history-sheeters, miscreants and solve missing person cases. The Delhi police has also used it to identify protestors during the 2019 anti-CAA protests, farmer protest, Jantar Mantar protest and anti-CEC protests. Delhi under it "safe city" project introduced in 2025, is also heavily investing in CCTV and AI-enabled surveillance that, beyond facial recognition is also capable of identifying "abnormal activity". Police forces, like Delhi police, Telangana police, Chennai Police and Punjab Police operate live facial recognition cameras installed at key locations in the city. The government also offers various services that use facial recognition systems, such as Digi Yatra for airtravellers, Poshan Tracker for ration distribution, and Aadhaar biometrics. Partnered with Amnesty Internation, Indian non-profit organization, Internet Freedom Foundation is challenging use of facial recognition technology through litigation and RTI activism, under its project "project panoptic".

=== Aadhaar biometrics ===
The Government of India in 2009 introduced Aadhaar, a 12 digit identification document that can be obtained by any resident of India, with a goal to improve welfare delivery in the country. The enrollment process to obtain Aadhaar requires the submission of biometric data in the form of fingerprints, and an iris scan. From its inception, the collection of this data for Aadhaar and its storage in a centralized database has raised privacy and surveillance concerns, with Aadhaar representing the world's largest such database with data on over 1.1 billion people. Over time Aadhaar has become increasingly mandatory to access basic state services, a necessary document for KYC verification to obtain a mobile SIM card, create a bank account, access loans, school and college admissions and scholarships, and has even been linked with other identification documents like the PAN card and Voter ID. Privacy advocates have pointed out that this level of Aadhaar integration allows the state to track all aspects of daily life of an individual as there is no legal restriction on the amount of information the government can access from this database, creating the necessary infrastructure for mass surveillance. The Aadhaar Act, 2016 tried to make Aadhaar mandatory for many public services including all welfare benefits and even allowed private companies to collect Aadhaar data, however the Supreme Court struck down these provisions of the act while upholding the validity of the act itself. However, despite this verdict many organisations have continued claiming Aadhaar as a mandatory requirement.

=== Sanchar Saathi ===
In 2025, it was reported that the Modi government was demanding that smartphones sold in India come pre-installed with Sanchar Saathi, a government-created app that has access to the phone's call log, memory and camera, raising concerns among privacy advocates.

== Indian mass surveillance projects ==
=== DRDO Netra ===
DRDO NETRA is another mass surveillance project of India. It has been developed by the Center for Artificial Intelligence & Robotics (CAIR) laboratory under the Defence Research and Development Organisation. The system could detect selective words like “bomb”, “blast”, “attack” or “kill” within seconds from emails, instant messages, status updates and tweets. The system will also be capable of gauging suspicious voice traffic on Skype and Google Talk. To enhance the capacity of the DRDO NETRA Project Black Knight was initiated in late 2013 to monitor social media trends and identify source of various viral messages that posed a risk to tranquility of the global community. Not much detail is available about the project, but it is rumored that the group of engineers later founded a private organization and now conducts social media analysis on Indian and foreign subjects by tapping fiber optic cables in India and overseas, including cybertapping infrastructure on the main internet communication cable in Mongolia which links rest of the world to China.

=== Lawful Intercept and Monitoring project ===
Lawful Intercept and Monitoring (LIM), is a clandestine mass electronic surveillance program deployed by the Centre for Development of Telematics (C-DOT), an Indian Government owned telecommunications technology development centre. LIM systems are used by the Indian Government to intercept records of voice, SMSs, GPRS data, details of a subscriber's application and recharge history and call detail record (CDR) and monitor Internet traffic, emails, web-browsing, Skype and any other Internet activity of Indian users. Mobile operators deploy their own LIM system which allows the government to intercept calls, after taking “due authorisation” in compliance with Section 5(2) of the Indian Telegraph Act read with Rule 419(A) of the IT Rules. The LIM system to monitor Internet traffic is deployed by the government at the international gateways of some large ISPs (between the ISPs Internet Edge Router (PE) and the core network). These surveillance systems are under complete control of the government, and their functioning is secretive and unknown to the ISPs.

=== NCCC ===
National Cyber Coordination Centre (NCCC) is an operational cybersecurity and e-surveillance agency under the Ministry of Home Affairs (MHA) in India. It is intended to screen communication metadata and co-ordinate the intelligence gathering activities of other agencies. Some have expressed concern that the body could encroach on Indian citizens' privacy and civil-liberties, given the lack of explicit privacy laws in the country. It aims at screening communication metadata and co-ordinate the intelligence gathering activities of other agencies. Many, including legal experts, in India believe that intelligence agencies and their e-surveillance projects require parliamentary oversight.

=== Telecom Enforcement Resource and Monitoring Project ===
Telecom Enforcement Resource and Monitoring (TERM), formerly known as Vigilance Telecom Monitoring (VTM), is the vigilance and monitoring wing of the Indian Department of Telecommunications (DoT). The main functions of TERM Cells are vigilance, monitoring and security of the network. Apart from this, TERM Cells also operate the Central Monitoring System and carry out other functions.

==== Central Monitoring System Project ====
Central Monitoring System is a surveillance related project of India. The project is run by Centre for Development of Telematics

=== National Intelligence Grid (NATGRID) ===
NATGRID project of Home ministry is creating a centralised database of citizens and companies recording every interaction with the government, which amounts to profiling and mass surveillance of citizens and companies.

== See also ==
- NATGRID
- Indian Intelligence Community
- Multi Agency Centre
- Telecom Enforcement Resource and Monitoring
- Puttaswamy v. Union of India
