= Patwar, Uttar Pradesh =

Patwar
- Village
- Nickname: Patiwar
- Location in Uttar Pradesh, India Patwar (India)
- Coordinates: 25°02′48.6″N 81°42′48.8″E
- Country: India
- State: Uttar Pradesh
- District: Prayagraj
- Established: 1891

Population (2020)
  - Total: 1,157

Languages
  - Official: Hindi
- Time zone: UTC+5:30 (IST)
- Postal code: 212106
- ISO 3166 code: IN-UP
- Vehicle registration: UP 70

Patwar is a village and gram panchayat in the Prayagraj district of Uttar Pradesh. It belongs to Prayagraj Division. Prayagraj, Chitrakoot, Rewa, and Varanasi are the closest cities to Patwar. It has an elevation of 145 m.

== Economy ==
This village all people are mainly dependent in agriculture.

== Notable people ==
Vipin Singh

== Communication and internet ==
- Bharat Sanchar Nigam Limited provides landline and broadband services.
- 2G and 4G mobile services are available.
- FTTH internet by Gram Panchayat National Broadband Network - BBNL
- Fibre based internet by Bharat Sanchar Nigam Limited
