= Telephone numbers in India =

- Location of India
- Country: India
- Continent: Asia
- Regulator: Department of Telecommunications
- Numbering plan type: Closed
- NSN length: 10
- Numbering plan: National Numbering Plan - 2003
- Last updated: 13 April 2015
- Country code: +91
- International access: 00
- Long-distance: 0

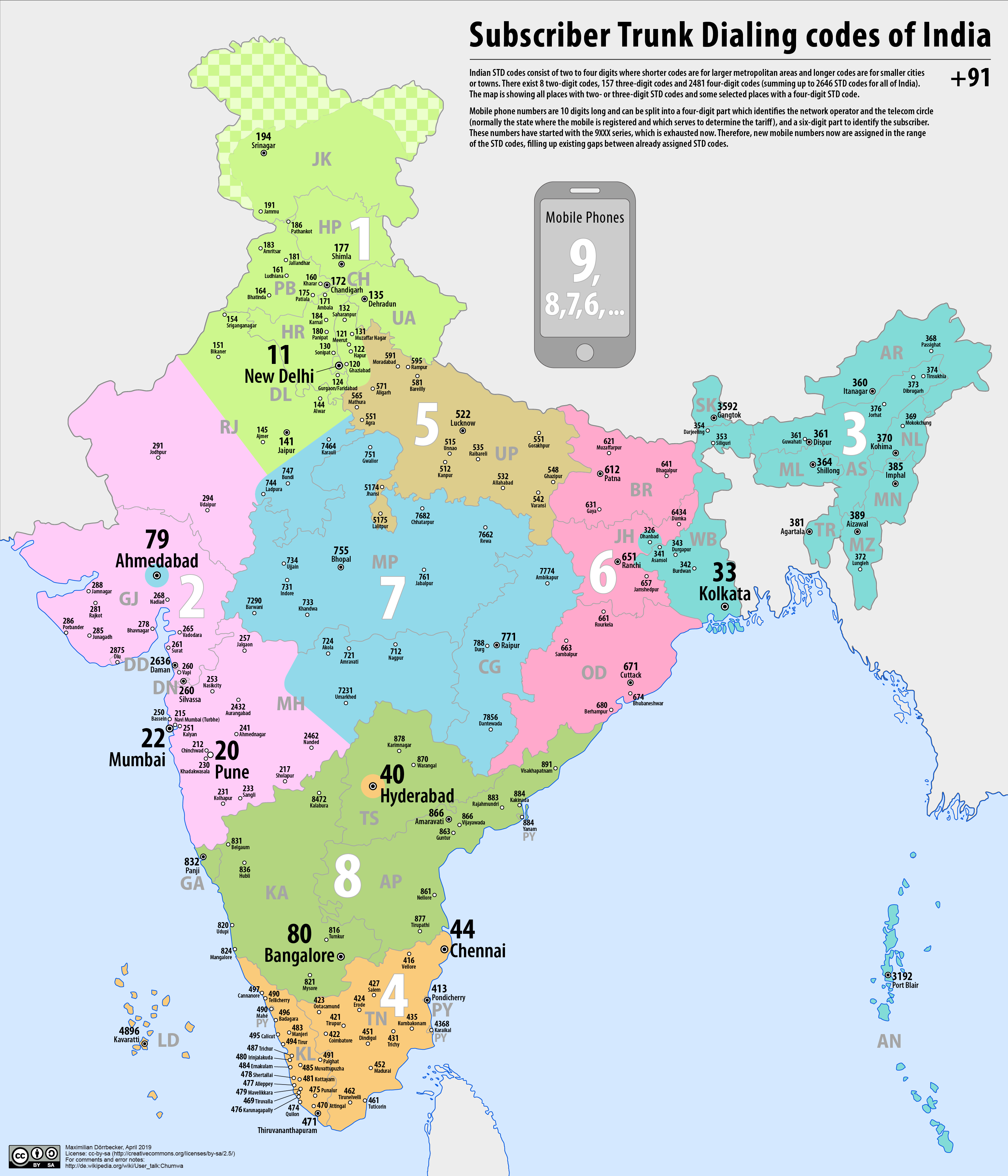
STD code map of India

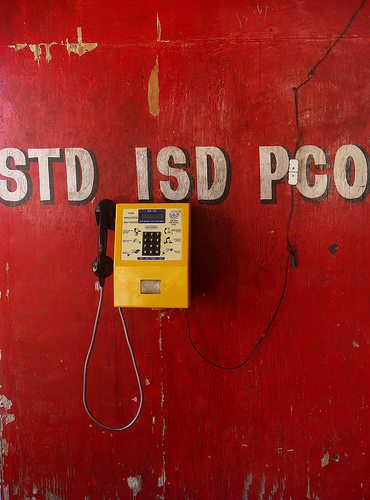
A public call office (PCO) in Auroville, India

Telephone numbers in India are administered under the National Numbering Plan of 2003 by the Department of Telecommunications of the Government of India. The numbering plan was last updated in 2015. The country code "91" was assigned to India by the International Telecommunication Union in the 1960s.

== Fixed-line (landline) numbers ==
Subscriber trunk dialling (STD) codes are assigned to each city, town and village. These codes can be between 2 and 8 digits long, with the largest metropolitan areas and cities having the shortest (two-digit) codes:

- 11 - New Delhi, Delhi
- 22 - Mumbai, Maharashtra
- 33 - Kolkata, West Bengal
- 44 - Chennai, Tamil Nadu
- 20 - Pune, Maharashtra
- 40 - Hyderabad, Telangana
- 79 - Ahmedabad, Gujarat
- 80 - Bengaluru, Karnataka

Second-tier cities and metropolitan areas, as well as large or particularly significant towns have three-digit area codes:

- 120 - Ghaziabad and Noida, Uttar Pradesh
- 124 - Gurugram, Haryana
- 129 - Faridabad, Haryana
- 135 - Dehradun, Uttarakhand
- 141 - Jaipur, Rajasthan
- 160 - Kharar, Punjab
- 161 - Ludhiana, Punjab
- 172 - Chandigarh Capital Region, Chandigarh, Punjab and Haryana
- 175 - Patiala, Punjab
- 181 - Jalandhar, Punjab
- 183 - Amritsar, Punjab
- 191 - Jammu, Jammu & Kashmir
- 194: - Srinagar, Jammu & Kashmir
- 233 - Sangli, Maharashtra
- 240 - Aurangabad, Maharashtra
- 241 - Ahmednagar, Maharashtra
- 250 - Vasai-Virar, Maharashtra
- 251 - Kalyan-Dombivli, Maharashtra
- 253 - Nashik, Maharashtra
- 257 - Jalgaon, Maharashtra
- 260 - Daman, Dadra and Nagar Haveli and Daman and Diu
- 261 - Surat, Gujarat
- 265 - Vadodara, Gujarat
- 343 - Durgapur, West Bengal
- 413 - Puducherry, Puducherry
- 422 - Coimbatore, Tamil Nadu
- 431 - Tiruchirappalli, Tamil Nadu
- 435 - Kumbakonam, Tamil Nadu
- 452 - Madurai, Tamil Nadu
- 462 - Tirunelveli, Tamil Nadu
- 469 - Thiruvalla, Pathanamthitta District, Kerala
- 471 - Thiruvananthapuram, Kerala
- 474 - Kollam, Kerala
- 477 - Alappuzha, Kerala
- 478 - Cherthala, Alappuzha District, Kerala
- 481 - Kottayam, Kerala
- 483 - Malappuram, Kerala
- 484 - Kochi, Kerala
- 485 - Muvattupuzha, Ernakulam District, Kerala
- 486 - Pathanamthitta, Kerala
- 487 - Thrissur, Kerala
- 490 - Thalassery, Kannur District, Kerala
- 495 - Kozhikode, Kerala
- 497 - Kannur, Kerala
- 512 - Kanpur, Uttar Pradesh
- 522 - Lucknow, Uttar Pradesh
- 532 - Prayagraj, Uttar Pradesh
- 542 - Varanasi, Uttar Pradesh
- 551 - Gorakhpur, Uttar Pradesh
- 562 - Agra, Uttar Pradesh
- 581 - Bareilly, Uttar Pradesh
- 591 - Moradabad, Uttar Pradesh
- 621 - Muzaffarpur, Bihar
- 612 - Patna, Bihar
- 641 - Bhagalpur, Bihar
- 657 - Jamshedpur, Jharkhand
- 712 - Nagpur, Maharashtra
- 721 - Amravati, Maharashtra
- 724 - Akola, Maharashtra
- 751 - Gwalior, Madhya Pradesh
- 761 - Jabalpur, Madhya Pradesh
- 820 - Udupi, Karnataka
- 821 - Mysore, Karnataka
- 824 - Mangalore, Karnataka
- 831 - Belgaum, Karnataka
- 836 - Hubli-Dharwad, Karnataka
- 863 - Guntur, Andhra Pradesh
- 866 - Vijayawada, Andhra Pradesh
- 870 - Warangal, Telangana
- 891 - Visakhapatnam, Andhra Pradesh
- 3192 - Port Blair, South Andaman Island, Andaman and Nicobar Islands
- 4896 - Kavaratti, Lakshadweep

The first-ever long-distance subscriber trunk dialing (STD) call in India was made between the cities of Kanpur and Lucknow in 1960.

The total length of all phone numbers (area code and the phone number) is constant at 10 digits. For example, the number 7513200000 signifies the area code 751 (the area code for Gwalior) followed by the phone number.

Fixed-line or landline numbers are at most 8 digits long.

=== Fixed-line operators ===
Due to the availability of multiple operators offering fixed-line (landline) services (either wired or wireless), there is an operator code for each telephone number, which is the first digit in the phone number.

Operator	Prefix
BSNL / MTNL	2
Jio	3
Airtel	4
MTS / HFCL	5
Tata Indicom	6
Datacom Solutions	7

For example, a number formatted in the style (020) 3xxx-xxxx represents a fixed-line number in Pune operated by Jio, while (011) 2xxx-xxxx is a fixed-line number in Delhi operated by MTNL, and (07582) 2xx-xxx is a fixed-line number in Sagar, Madhya Pradesh operated by BSNL.

=== Format for dialling fixed-line numbers ===
No prefix is required to call from one landline to another within the same area code, as variable-length dialling rules apply. A prefix of the number zero + the area code is required to dial from a landline phone in one STD code area to another. The same prefix of the number zero + the area code is required to dial any fixed-line number in India from a mobile phone, irrespective of the area code.

For example, to dial a landline number in Gwalior, one would have to dial

- from a landline in Gwalior: the phone number
- from a landline in Mumbai: 0751 and then the phone number
- from any mobile phone in India: 0751 and then the phone number
- from outside India: +91, then 751, and then the phone number

Before 10 March 2009, as per Department of Telecommunications memorandum dated 9 February 2009. there were some exceptions to this general rule for STD areas falling close to each other (within a radius of 200 kilometre), where "0" can be replaced with "95" e.g. to dial Delhi from Gurgaon, one dials 9511+landline number.

== Mobile numbers ==
A typical mobile number in India is "+91 xxxx-nnnnnn". The first four digits initially indicated an operator's code, while the remaining six digits are unique to the subscriber. However, with mobile number portability in place, the first four digits no longer indicate a particular operator.

== Short code ==
There are many businesses in the Indian market who rent keywords on a monthly basis, whose characters on a typical mobile phone keypad represent short codes. Short codes are five digits in length and have to start with the digit '5' like 58888 as of 2007. Previously, they were four-digit in number and could be of any combination, like 8888 or 7827. The current five digits can be extended by three digits further representing 3 additional characters. Messages sent to these short codes are commonly referred to as Premium Rate SMS Messages and have a cost per message depending on the operator as well as the service and the company.

== Telemarketing ==
Telemarketers have been issued 10-digit telephone numbers starting with 140 (140XXXXXXX) by the Department of Telecommunications on TRAI's request.

== Notes ==
1.The Chandigarh Capital Region is a metropolitan area that consists of areas in the union territory of Chandigarh, and the states of Punjab and Haryana.
