= Wireless Planning and Coordination Wing =

The Wireless Planning & Coordination Wing (WPC) is a Wing of Department of Telecommunications coming under the Ministry of Communications of the Government of India. The department is responsible for issuing amateur radio licenses, allotting the frequency spectrum and monitoring the frequency spectrum. The WPC is headquartered in New Delhi and has regional branches in Mumbai, Chennai, Kolkata and Guwahati.

WPC is divided into major sections like Licensing and Regulation (LR), New Technology Group (NTG) and Standing Advisory Committee on Radio Frequency Allocation (SACFA). SACFA makes recommendations on major frequency allocation issues, formulation of the frequency allocation plan, making recommendations on the various issues related to International Telecom Union (ITU), to sort out problems referred to the committee by various wireless users, siting clearance of all wireless installations in the country, etc.

Technical Group 'A' officers manning this organisation comes under cadre of Indian Radio Regulatory Service. Wireless Adviser of India is highest officer in the hierarchy, who report to Member (Technology) of Telecom Commission of India under Department of Telecommunications.

Permission from WPC is required for importing any radio equipment in India, including walkie-talkie, RC cars/boats, drones/UAV, ZigBee, Bluetooth devices, etc. Imports of radio equipment into India, without prior permission from WPC, will be confiscated by Customs at point of entry. Individual WPC permission is not required for phones, computers, and routers. The certification process includes the application, evaluation and testing of the product before the WPC certificate and ETA (Equipment Type Approval) certification number is issued. There is currently no factory inspection needed and the tests can also be conducted by an accredited testing facility outside of India.

== See also ==
- Indian Radio Regulatory Service
- Wireless Monitoring Organisation (WMO)
- Department of Telecommunications
- International Telecommunication Union
