= Ordnance Cable Factory Chandigarh =

- Company type: Government
- Industry: Defence
- Founded: Chandigarh, India (1963)
- Products: Cables, Wires

Ordnance Cable Factory Chandigarh (Hindi: आयुध केबल फैक्टरी चंडीगढ़) is a facility under Ordnance Factories Board, Kolkata. It manufactures transmission cables and steel wires mainly for defense and telecommunication sector. Primarily a vendor for Indian Armed Forces, this facility now caters to non-defense industries as well, clients being: Indian Railways, Department of Telecommunications, State Electricity Boards and private industries. It also sells pistols and revolvers. Ordnance cable factory (OCFC) name changed to Ordnance factory Chandigarh(OFCD)on 21/02/2020.

== History ==
The unit was established in 1963 with technical assistance from SUMITOMO, Japan.

== Products ==
- Field Telephone Cable JWD-1
- Carrier Quad Cable
- Spring Steel Wires
- Air Field Lighting Spares
- Jelly Filled Cable
- Cable Assemblies for T-72 & BMP-II Tanks
- Day Vision Devices of T-72 & BMP-II Tanks
