= Madhya Pradesh State Wide Area Network =

Government project in Indian state

Madhya Pradesh is a small state situated in the central India having an area of around 308000 km^{2}. The state's administration operates through 48 districts, 272 tehsils, and 313 Blocks. In order to avail financial and social benefits of Information Technology, the establishment of State Wide Area Network (SWAN) has been envisaged. The SWAN will provide primary backbone for communication of voice, data and video throughout the state and will be an effective tool for implementation of e-Governance Projects.

== Scope of SWAN ==
- State Head Quarter (NMC) : 1
- Number of Divisions : 10
- Number of Districts : 51
- Number of Blocks/Tehsils : 380
- Number of POPs:(NMC)=380 .

== Project details ==
=== Date of commencement ===
23 August 2008

=== Project cost ===
- Rs. 116.70 Crores DIT, GOI shall be funding
- Rs. 57.50 Crores is borne by the Govt of MP.
- Total: Rs. 174.21 Crores.

== Project overview ==
- Software Technology Parks of India (STPI) was appointed as the consultant for the project.
- STPI carried out a study to assess the requirements of MPSWAN and accordingly designed the Network.
- State Government Departments, Public enterprises and Organizations in Madhya Pradesh will use SWAN for their e-Governance projects
- Through MPSWAN all the Government Departments will be connected
- A Total number of 360 PoPs has to be established in CHQ, DHQ & BHQ
- M/s Netlink software pvt ltd. is the implementing agency for MPSWAN Project
- MPSEDC has been monitoring the preparation of PoP sites
- As on date 317 PoPs has been established
- 99 Horizontal connections has been established as on date.

== MP SWAN locations ==
- Alirajpur
- Anuppur
- Ashoknagar
- Balaghat
- Barwani
- Betul
- Bhind
- Bhopal
- Burhanpur
- Chhatarpur
- Chhindwara
- Damoh
- Datia
- Dewas
- Dhar
- Dindori
- Guna
- Gwalior
- Harda
- Hoshangabad
- Indore
- Jabalpur
- Jhabua
- Katni
- Khandwa
- Khargone
- Mandla
- Mandsaur
- Morena
- Narsinghpur
- Neemuch
- Panna
- Raisen
- Rajgarh
- Ratlam
- Rewa
- Sagar
- Satna
- Sehore
- Seoni
- Singrauli
- Shahdol
- Shajapur
- Sheopur
- Shivpuri
- Sidhi
- Tikamgarh
- Ujjain
- Umaria
- Vidisha

== See also ==
- State Wide Area Network
