= Wireless Monitoring Organisation =

Indian government agency

The Wireless Monitoring Organisation (WMO), set up in 1952, is responsible for monitoring all wireless transmissions on behalf of the Wireless Planning & Coordination Wing (WPC) in the Ministry of Communications of the Government of India. Its primary task is to monitor the entire radio frequency spectrum with a view to provide the requisite technical data logistic support to the WPC Wing in the enforcement of the National and International Radio Regulatory and statutory provisions for efficient management of Radio Frequency Spectrum and Geo-Stationary Orbit. This is in the interest of vital national service which, though not revenue bearing, yields considerable indirect benefits through promoting the efficient utilisation of the radio frequency spectrum and the geostationary orbit.

Its headquarters is located at Pushpa Bhawan, New Delhi. Under it, there are 28 Wireless Monitoring Stations (WMSs) (including five International Monitoring Stations, IMSs) and 1 International Satellite Monitoring Earth Station (ISMES), Jalna, Maharashtra strategically located all over the country. These monitoring stations carry out monitoring in MF, HF, VHF, UHF and SHF.

== Prosecution ==
The WMO works with local police forces to conduct raids of illegal signal repeaters in major cities.

== Awards programme ==
WMO awards are an annual award presented to officers of Indian Radio Regulatory Services for extraordinary and exceptional contributions made in the field of Spectrum Monitoring & Resource Management. It was constituted by Wireless Monitoring Organisation, Ministry of Communications, Government of India and was first presented in August 2013. In this award a citation consisting of Certificate of Appreciation is presented to awardee on Independence Day/Republic Day.

== See also ==
- Wireless Planning & Coordination Wing (WPC)
- Indian Radio Regulatory Service
- Department of Telecommunications
