= DRDO NETRA =

Indian software network

NETRA (from "networking traffic analysis") is a software network developed by India's Centre for Artificial Intelligence and Robotics (CAIR), a Defence Research and Development Organisation (DRDO) laboratory, and is used by the Intelligence Bureau, India's domestic intelligence agency, and the Research and Analysis Wing (R&AW), the country's external intelligence agency to intercept and analyse internet traffic using pre-defined filters. The program was tested at smaller scales by various national security agencies, and is reported to be deployed nationwide as of 2022.

== Development history ==
Security agencies were looking to build a system that could monitor internet traffic on a real time basis due to the rapidly escalating threat posed by terrorist and criminal elements using data communication, which had brought service providers like BlackBerry, Skype and Gmail into the focus of law enforcement agencies.

Two such systems were designed, one by the DRDO's Centre for Artificial Intelligence and Robotics, and the other by the National Technical Research Organisation (NTRO), which is India's technical intelligence agency. An inter-ministerial committee staffed by members from the Ministry of Home Affairs, Intelligence Bureau (IB), Department of Telecom, Department of IT, and National Investigation Agency was formed to evaluate both systems and to select one internet monitoring system.

NTRO's system was designed with the help of Paladion, an international private company and NETRA was designed by a team of 40 scientists from CAIR. The committee selected CAIR's NETRA as it had multiple issues with NTRO's system. It had serious security reservations about involvement of an international private company in such a sensitive project, and had doubts about NTRO's ability to operate, maintain and upgrade their system independently. Also, the Research and Analysis Wing (R&AW), which tested NTRO's system was not happy with the NTRO solution and reported that it crashed frequently. The committee favoured NETRA as it was an indigenous solution involving government scientists and personnel and no component of solution had been outsourced to an outside agency. The agency testing NETRA, the IB, was also pleased with its performance. The committee further observed that CAIR has been continuously investing in R&D to keep up with the fast-changing web technologies, unlike NTRO. The system was first demonstrated at the premises of Sify Technologies to capture the entire internet traffic passing through its probes.

== Capabilities ==
NETRA can analyse voice traffic passing through software such as Skype and Google Talk, and intercept messages with keywords such as 'attack', 'bomb', 'blast' or 'kill' in real-time from the enormous number of tweets, status updates, emails, instant messaging transcripts, internet calls, blogs, forums and even images generated on the internet to obtain the desired intelligence. The system with RAW analyses large amount of international data which crosses through the internet networks in India. Three security agencies, which include the IB and RAW, have each been allotted a maximum of 300 Gigabytes (GB) per node totaling more than 1000 nodes for storing intercepted internet traffic (so, there are 1000 nodes x 300GB = 300,000GB of total space is initially decided to set up.), and an extra 100 GB per node is assigned to the remaining law enforcement agencies.

== Netra ==
The Internet Scanning and Coordination Centre will use this system to monitor the internet, similar to the ones used by USA, UK, China, Iran and many other nations. Initially, R&AW was the only current user of this monitoring system, but in 2013, the Ministry of Home Affairs recommended the use of a second NETRA system by domestic law enforcement agencies. This was done as the intelligence gathered by the external intelligence agency were largely irrelevant for the use by law enforcement agencies, and could not handle more data. A note from the Department of Telecommunications (DOT) stated that the system can provide access to multiple security agencies.

Netra's deployment was discussed in 2013 by an apex inter-ministerial group headed by DoT, and included representative from the Cabinet Secretariat, Ministry of Home Affairs, DRDO, CAIR, Intelligence Bureau, C-DoT and Computer Emergency Response Team (CERT-In).

== Awards and recognition ==
DRDO Scientist Dr. G. Athithan of CAIR and his team were awarded the 'Agni award for excellence in self-reliance 2008' for developing NETRA. The team comprised scientists from Indian Institute of Science, G. Ravindra and Rahul M. Kharge.

== See also ==
- Mass surveillance in India
- NATGRID, the Indian national intelligence grid.
- Central Monitoring System
- Telecom Enforcement Resource and Monitoring
- National Internet Exchange of India
