= Indian Radio Regulatory Service =

Government body

The Indian Radio Regulatory Service (IRRS) is one of the cadre of central government recruit-engineers of the Wireless Planning & Coordination Wing (WPC) and Wireless Monitoring Organisation (WMO), composed of a cadre of central government recruit engineers Group 'A' officers and Group 'B' officers (Jr. Wireless Officer) of the WPC and WMO. There are a total of 22 Wireless Monitoring Stations, 5 International Monitoring Stations and 1 International Satellite Monitoring Earth Station in India, The functions of the service are the allocation of spectrum licenses, ensuring an interference free spectrum to wireless users, conducting GMDSS and RTR (Aero) examination, SACFA clearances to Telecom service Providers, ensuring adherence to international standards and cooperation with the International Telecommunication Union (ITU). The Government of India established the service by a gazette notification on 16 July 2013. The Wireless Adviser to the Government of India is the highest officer in the service's hierarchy and reports to the Member (Technology) of Telecom Commission of India under the Department of Telecommunications.

New Group 'A' officers enter the IRRS through the Engineering Services Examination. New Group 'B' officers (Jr. Wireless Officers) enter the IRRS through the Staff Selection Commission (SSC) Graduate Level Examination.

== See also ==
- Wireless Planning & Coordination Wing (WPC)
- Wireless Monitoring Organisation (WMO)
- Department of Telecommunications
