= Telecom Enforcement Resource and Monitoring =

Telecom Enforcement Resource and Monitoring (TERM)
Agency overview
- Formed: October 2004
- Type: Telecommunications vigilance and monitoring
- Jurisdiction: Government of India
- Minister responsible: Manoj Sinha, Minister of Communications and Information Technology
- Parent department: Department of Telecommunications (DoT)

Telecom Enforcement Resource and Monitoring (TERM), formerly known as Vigilance Telecom Monitoring (VTM), is the vigilance and monitoring wing of the Indian Department of Telecommunications (DoT). TERM is made up of 34 Cells in India's 22 telecom circles and 10 large telecom districts, each headed by a Senior Administrative Grade (SAG) level officer, termed as Deputy Director General (DDG). The main functions of TERM Cells are vigilance, monitoring and security of the network. Apart from this, TERM Cells also operate the Central Monitoring System (CMS), a clandestine mass electronic surveillance program, and carry out other functions. The TERM Cells function as the subordinate offices of the DoT in the field. These Cells represent the Telegraph Authority and the Licensor.

== History ==
Vigilance Telecom Monitoring Cells (VTM) were created by the Government to control illegal/clandestine telecom operations. Three VTM Cells were set up in October 2004 at Delhi, Mumbai and Hyderabad, and a fourth cell was created at Chennai the following month. Cells were added at Gujarat, Karnataka, Kerala, Maharashtra, Punjab, Rajasthan, Tamil Nadu, Uttar Pradesh (East), and West Bengal in August 2006, and at Andaman and Nicobar, Andhra Pradesh, Assam, Bihar, Chhattisgarh, Haryana, Himachal Pradesh, Jammu and Kashmir, Jharkhand, Madhya Pradesh, North East-I, North East-II, Orissa, Uttarakhand, and Uttar Pradesh (West) in January 2007. Cells were added in March 2007 for Ahmedabad, Bangalore, Jaipur, Kolkata, Lucknow and Pune, taking the total number of VTM Cells to 34.

VTM Cells were renamed to Telecom Enforcement Resource and Monitoring (TERM) Cells, with effect from 5 August 2008. The Government felt that the new name reflected "the entire gamut of functions assigned to the Cells" and "distinguished their role vis-vis staff-vigilance activities".

== Functions ==
TERM Cells analyze and resolve complaints received through the Public Grievance (PG) portal or from other sources. TERM Cells were given the task of checking the compliance of EMF radiation norms, as prescribed by Government, in 2010. TERM Cells collect a fee from operators for carrying out EMF testing. Other functions of TERM Cells are checking mobile spectrum utilization and investigation of complaints regarding telecom and Internet services.

=== Registration of OSPs ===
Due to the growth of the business process outsourcing (BPO) industry in India, the DoT decided to decentralize the registration of Other Service Providers (OSPs), which was being done by the DoT, HQ. The job of registering OSPs and telemarketers was given to TERM Cells. The task of registering telemarketers was later given to the Telecom Regulatory Authority of India (TRAI). OSP registrations are done using software developed with the help of the National Informatics Centre (NIC). The website for OSP registration is http://dotosp.gov.in.

=== Service testing ===
TERM Cells were given the task of service testing of licensed TSPs in the licensed service area and checking their roll-out obligations as per the license conditions. As per the license agreement, all the TSPs are required to roll out their services within prescribed time periods, which means they have to offer their services in the districts selected by them by a fixed date. This then crosschecked for quality, coverage and other parameters by the DoT which is termed as Service Testing. TERM Cells also issue Service Test Result Certificates (STRCs) against the cases tested by them. Apart from this TERM Cells also send compiled data pertaining to roll out obligation for imposing Liquidated Damage (LD) charges on the TSPs do not comply with roll-out obligation conditions. TERM Cells collect a fee from operators for carrying out testing.

=== Central Monitoring System ===
The Central Monitoring System (CMS) is a clandestine mass electronic surveillance program installed by the Centre for Development of Telematics (C-DOT), an Indian Government owned telecommunications technology development centre, and operated by TERM Cells. The CMS gives India's security agencies and income tax officials centralized access to India's telecommunications network and the ability to listen in on and record mobile, landline and satellite calls and voice over Internet Protocol (VoIP), and read private emails, SMS and MMS, geolocate people using Mobile phone tracking, all in real time. It can also monitor posts on social media and Google searches, without any parliamentary or judicial oversight.

== List of TERM Cells ==
There are currently 34 TERM Cells in India's 24 telecom circles and 10 large telecom districts. Each cell is headed by a Senior Administrative Grade (SAG) level officer, termed as Deputy Director General (DDG).

S. No.	TERM Cell	Location	Area of Jurisdiction	Created
1	Ahmedabad	Khanpur, Ahmedabad	Ahmedabad Telecom District	March 2007
2	Andaman & Nicobar	Port Blair, Andaman district	Andaman and Nicobar Islands	January 2007
3	Andhra Pradesh	Mogalrajpuram, Vijayawada	Andhra Pradesh (Telecom Circle), excluding Hyderabad Telecom District	January 2007
4	Assam	Pan Bazar, Guwahati	Assam (Telecom Circle)	January 2007
5	Bangalore	Sanchar Complex, WMS Compound, Jayanagar 5th Block Bangalore	Bangalore Telecom District	March 2007
6	Bihar	Telephone Bhawan, Patna	Bihar	January 2007
7	Chennai	Kellys Road, Chennai	Chennai (Metro district), Pondicherry (Telecom Districts)	November 2004
8	Chhattisgarh	Jaistambh Chowk, Raipur	Chhattisgarh	January 2007
9	Delhi	Nehru Place, New Delhi	Delhi, including Ghaziabad, Noida, Faridabad and Gurgaon	October 2004
10	Gujarat	Khanpur, Ahmedabad	Gujarat, excluding Ahmedabad Telecom District	August 2006
11	Haryana	Ambala	Haryana, excluding Faridabad and Gurgaon	January 2007
12	Himachal Pradesh	Shimla	Himachal Pradesh	January 2007
13	Hyderabad	Hyderabad	Hyderabad (Telecom District)	October 2004
14	Jaipur	Jhalana Institutional Area, Jaipur	Jaipur Telecom District	March 2007
15	Jammu and Kashmir	Trikuta Nagar, Jammu	Jammu and Kashmir	January 2007
16	Jharkhand	Neori, Ranchi	Jharkhand	January 2007
17	Karnataka	Jayanagar, Bangalore	Karnataka, excluding Bangalore Telecom District	August 2006
18	Kerala	Gandhi Nagar, Kochi	Kerala and Lakshadweep	August 2006
19	Kolkata	Salt Lake City, Kolkata	Kolkata Telecom District	March 2007
20	Lucknow	Gomti Nagar, Lucknow	Lucknow Telecom District	March 2007
21	Madhya Pradesh	Hoshangabad Road, Bhopal	Madhya Pradesh	January 2007
22	Maharashtra	Nagpur	Maharashtra, excluding Pune Telecom District	August 2006
23	Mumbai	Andheri (East), Mumbai	Mumbai (Metro District)	October 2004
24	North East-I	Shillong	North East-I (Telecom Circle)	January 2007
25	North East-II	Dimapur	North East-II (Telecom Circle)	January 2007
26	Orissa	Bhubaneswar	Orissa	January 2007
27	Pune	Church Road, Pune Camp, Pune	Pune Telecom District	March 2007
28	Punjab	Mohali, Chandigarh	Punjab, including Chandigarh	August 2006
29	Rajasthan	Jhalana Institutional Area, Jaipur	Rajasthan, excluding Jaipur Telecom District	August 2006
30	Tamil Nadu	Bharthi Park Road-II, Coimbatore	Tamil Nadu	August 2006
31	Uttar Pradesh (East)	Gomti Nagar, Lucknow	UP(E) (Telecom Circle) excluding Lucknow Telecom District	August 2006
32	Uttar Pradesh (West)	Meerut	UP(W) (Circle) excluding Ghaziabad and Noida	January 2007
33	Uttaranchal	Rajpur Road, Dehradun	Uttarakhand	January 2007
34	West Bengal	Kolkata	West Bengal, excluding Kolkata (Telecom Circle), and Sikkim	August 2006

== See also ==
- National Technical Research Organisation, India's technical intelligence agency.
- NETRA, a mass surveillance, internet traffic analysis system.
- NATGRID, the Indian national intelligence grid.
- Mass surveillance in India
- Ministry of Communications and Information Technology
