= Tejas Networks =

Telecommunications equipment company

- Type: Public
- Traded as: NSE: TEJASNET; BSE: 540595
- Industry: Telecommunications equipment
- Founded: 2000; 26 years ago
- Headquarters: Bengaluru, Karnataka, India
- Area served: Worldwide
- Key people: Arnob Roy (CEO & MD); Preetham U (COO); Sanjay Malik (CBO); Kumar N. Sivarajan (CTO)
- Products: xPON-based Fiber Broadband Access, Converged Packet Optical, OTN/DWDM, PTN, Carrier Ethernet Routing & Switching, 4G/LTE based Wireless Broadband, Satellite Communication Devices, Broadcast Devices, 5G RAN, Converged Core
- Revenue: ▲₹1,103 crore (US$120 million) (2026)
- Operating income: ▲₹1,354 crore (US$140 million) (2026)
- Net income: ▲₹909 crore (US$97 million) (2026)
- Total assets: ▲₹7,148 crore (US$760 million) (2026)
- Total equity: ▲₹2,931 crore (US$310 million) (2026)
- Number of employees: 2200+
- Parent: Tata Sons
- Website: www.tejasnetworks.com

Tejas Networks is an Indian optical, broadband and data networking products company. The company designs develops and sells its products to telecom service providers, internet service providers, utilities, security and government entities in 75 countries. The company has built many IPs in multiple areas of telecom networking and has emerged as an exporter to other developing countries including Southeast Asia and Africa.

== History ==
Founded in 2000 by Sanjay Nayak with initial funding from Gururaj Deshpande. They were later joined by Kumar Sivarajan (an academic at Indian Institute of Science, Bengaluru and author of a book on optical fiber) along with Arnob Roy (an ex-colleague of Nayak). Tejas Network made a beginning with the development of Intelligent Network technologies. These networks transferred data between two points at the precise speed as per the requirements of the customer. The network also rerouted and cleaned the traffic in case of disruptions During 2002–2003, the company acquired ten customers.

Tejas Networks went public on BSE and NSE in June 2017 with a valuation of Rs 2301 crore (23,010,000,000).The organization is considered to be the first listed player in the optical networking equipment space in India by Centrum Broking analysts Alpesh Thacker and Siddhartha Khemka. The anchor investors that bet on Tejas Networks ahead of its IPO were namely Abu Dhabi Investment Authority, East Bridge Capital and PremjiInvest, the family investment arm of Wipro. In 2020, Tejas Network developed the world's largest disaggregated packet-optical switch that was called TJ1600S/I.

In FY26, Tejas Networks expanded its technology stack by developing multi-terabit optical routing platforms and indigenous 5G Radio Access Network (RAN) and Converged Core solutions tailored for high-density broadband and enterprise connectivity.

In its latest credit assessment, ICRA updated Tejas Networks' ratings to reflect the company's strengthened capital backing from Panatone Finvest (Tata Sons) and its expanding execution of major national 4G/5G rollout contracts.

On 29 July 2021, Tata Sons, through its subsidiary Panatone Finvest Limited, initiated an investment in Tejas Networks to buy a 43.35% stake for Rs 1884 crore through shares and warrants. According to The Economic Times, Tejas Networks is looking to use Tata group’s backing to expand its telecom products portfolio. In March 2022, Tejas Networks acquired 64% of Saankhya Labs, an Indian wireless communication and semiconductor company. In April 2022, Tata Sons, through Panatone Finvest Limited, increased its shareholding of Tejas Networks to 52.45%, and thus, acquired the majority of Tejas' shares.

== Business ==
Tejas also has products created on 10G-PON technology, and its equipment are upgradable to 5G. They help private telecom operators in India by supplying GPON equipment. They are partnering with system integrators to bid for BSNL’s 4G tender and investing in 4G wireless. Tejas also supports BSNL’s optical transmission network.

The company is supplying its products to Bharti Airtel for supporting optical network and implementing 5G backhaul, B2B services and broadband applications.

Tejas Networks also supplies GPON equipment to private telecom operators in India.

Tejas' GPON solution has been deployed in BharatNet, it is the world's largest greenfield rural broadband rollout delivering high-speed Internet services to more than 200 million people. Tejas Equipments have helped provide broadband internet to all of India's gram panchayats and has helped connect 40,000 villages so far. Tejas’ broadband products are helping 70% requirement of the BharatNet project.

Tejas Networks has filed for 520+ patents, of which 127 have been granted. They compete with other players in market like Ericsson, Nokia-Siemens, Huawei, Alcatel-Lucent, Ciena and Adva. With the help of PLI Scheme, Tejas is increasing the production to support local demand and reduce $5 billion import bill for the FTTx segment.

== Patents and Industry Contributions ==
Tejas Networks has actively contributed to global telecom standards and domestic R&D. Over the years, the company has filed for more than 520+ patents, with a significant portfolio granted across optical, wireless, and data networking technologies. Tejas actively participates in 3GPP and ITU standardization committees, advancing India’s self-reliance in indigenous telecom hardware.

== Awards and recognition ==
Tejas Networks was recognized with the 2023 Voice and Data Excellence award in the "Make in India" category for their state-of-the-art TJ1400 Access and Aggregation Routers.

In subsequent years, Tejas Networks earned multiple industry honors for innovation in telecom technology, including recognition at the Telecom Equipment Export Promotion Council (TEPC) Awards and Aegis Graham Bell Awards for its Make-in-India 4G/5G RAN products and optical transmission systems.

== Partnerships ==
In April 2023, Tejas Networks secured a significant contract valued at Rs 696 crore from BSNL to upgrade their pan-India IP-MPLS-based Access and Aggregation Network (MAAN). This project involved supplying over 13,000 of Tejas Networks' next-generation TJ1400 routers.

In August 2023, Tejas Networks secured a ₹7,492 crore contract to supply its latest 4G/5G Radio Access Network (RAN) equipment for BSNL pan-India network, encompassing 100,000 sites. This involved a contract with Tata Consultancy Services (TCS) for supplying, supporting, and maintaining Tejas' equipment for BSNL's nationwide 4G/5G network.

In October 2023, Tejas Networks started its collaboration with FibreConnect, an Italian wholesale telecom infrastructure developer. Tejas Networks is the sole supplier for FibreConnect's FTTP (fiber-to-the-premise) rollout, providing a range of products including DWDM/PTN/OTN for Core, xPON and Ethernet for Access. This collaboration for Italian government's 'Transition 4.0' plan to digitize the manufacturing sector by providing broadband infrastructure to underserved industrial areas.

In March 2024, Tejas Networks signed a Memorandum of Understanding (MoU) with Telecom Egypt (TE), the Information Technology Industry Development Agency (ITIDA), and the National Telecom Institute (NTI) of Egypt. They started large-scale broadband projects in India, specifically the Bharatnet (rural broadband) and NKN (National Knowledge Network) initiatives, to develop similar infrastructure in Egypt and set up technical support services within Egypt to cater to both domestic and regional (Africa and the Middle East) customers. This partnership is to contribute to Egypt's "Digital Egypt" vision by expanding internet access, fostering technological expertise, and creating job opportunities in the telecom sector.

In June 2025, Rakuten Symphony and Tejas Networks announced a strategic partnership to develop integrated Open RAN solutions and undertake joint global expansion efforts.

In February 2026, Tejas Networks secured a contract with NEC Corporation to manufacture and supply 3GPP- and O-RAN-compliant 5G Massive MIMO radios for global markets.

In April 2026, Tejas Networks signed an MoU with IIT Gandhinagar to establish a Telecom Center of Excellence focusing on advanced wireline and wireless R&D.

In May 2026, Tejas Networks partnered with MahaIT (Maharashtra Information Technology Corporation Limited) to train over 10,000 engineers and build a skilled workforce ecosystem for indigenous 4G/5G and optical networks.
