= SIM binding =

Authentication method linking user identity to a physical SIM card

SIM binding is a security mechanism in which a user account, digital identity, or application session is cryptographically or logically associated with a registered SIM card The method verifies the presence of a specific SIM inside a user’s device before granting access, making it a stronger possession factor than SMS-based verification or password-only authentication.

SIM binding is a specialized form of Device binding that uses SIM identifiers such as IMSI or ICCID or SIM-resident cryptographic capabilities to provide non-replicable proof of device possession. It is increasingly adopted across mobile banking, digital payments, enterprise security, and messaging systems.

SIM binding is growing in popularity due to its ease of use and the greater level of security it provides compared to traditional PIN code verification.

== Overview ==
SIM binding links a user's digital identity to the physical SIM stored in their smartphone. After a SIM is registered, the authentication server validates its presence whenever the user attempts to log in. If the SIM is removed, swapped, or used in a different device, the system blocks access until identity is re-verified.

== Background ==
Device binding is a security practice where authentication tokens are tied to trusted devices. Devices capable of storing digital information such as smartphones, tablets, smartwatches, laptops, SIM cards, EMV payment cards, or hardware authenticators can function as tokens.

Authentication tokens generally fall under:

- Hardware tokens: USB keys, smart cards, wireless devices, or SIM cards.
- Software tokens: Applications like Google Authenticator or Microsoft Authenticator that generate one-time passwords.

== How SIM binding works ==
A SIM card is registered with an identity provider. Identity proofing may be conducted using KYC records, device checks, or telecom data.

=== Association ===
- SIM identifiers (IMSI/ICCID) or cryptographic responses are stored.
- Trusted mobile apps may validate SIM presence locally.

=== Authentication ===
During login:

- the system validates that the correct SIM is present, verifies device integrity, and checks for SIM replacement or cloning.

Continuous verification

High-security industries like Banking use periodic SIM presence checks to detect real-time fraud, unauthorized SIM swaps, or compromised sessions.

== Types of SIM binding ==
- Passive SIM binding
- Cryptographic SIM authentication
- App-integrated SIM binding

== Use in India ==
The Reserve Bank of India requires "dynamic or non-replicable" authentication for digital payment security. Device-based and SIM-based authentication methods are recognized as valid forms of strong customer authentication in India’s digital payment ecosystem.

In 2025, The Department of Telecommunications (DoT) has introduced the nationwide SIM Binding mandate, requiring major messaging platforms such as WhatsApp, Telegram, and Signal to automatically log out users every six hours if the SIM card linked to their account becomes inactive, is removed from the device, or is inserted into another phone. The mandate is expected to cause widespread disruption for millions of legitimate users who rely on multi-device access for business communication, remote work, education, and travel, forcing them into repetitive verification loops and breaking the multi-platform functionality these apps were built for.

== See also ==
- Multi-factor authentication
- Device fingerprinting
- Passwordless authentication
- Public key infrastructure
- Mobile security
