= Centre for Development of Telematics =

Government-owned telecommunications centre in India

- सी-डॉट; C-DOT

Agency overview
- Formed: 25 August 1984; 41 years ago
- Type: R&D Centre in Telecom
- Jurisdiction: India
- Headquarters: Delhi, India
- Ministers responsible: [Jyotiraditya Scindia], Minister of Communications (India); Devusinh Chauhan, Minister of State for Communications (India)
- Agency executives: Dr Rajkumar Upadhyay, Executive Director; Dr Pankaj Kumar Dalela, Director
- Website: http://www.cdot.in

The Centre for Development of Telematics (C-DOT) is an Indian Government owned telecommunications technology development centre. It was established in 1984 with an initial mandate of designing and developing digital exchanges. C-DOT has expanded to develop telecom equipment, both wireless and wired, since the 1980s. It has offices in Delhi, Bangalore and Kolkata. It is one of the few government organisations in India which have been appraised at Maturity Level 5 of CMMI-DEV v1.3.

In February 2014, United Telecoms Limited, the technology licensee of CDOT, had won a GPON order from BBNL to a value of approximately Rs 1000 Cr. This is the biggest win by any CDOT partner in global competitive bidding in recent years. For the same project National Optical Fibre Network, C-DOT won the NMS tender. CDOT has contributed significantly to the telecom sector, and it is known as the temple of technology in India.

Presently, CDOT is implementing Common Alert Protocol for India by developing a location-based Integrated Disaster Early Warning System for the National Disaster Management Authority. In this project, Forecasting agencies like IMD, CWC, INCOIS, GSI, SASE, and national to state-level disaster management authorities in a common platform for the dissemination of early warnings for cyclones, floods, thunderstorms, sandstorms, tsunamis, landslides, and avalanches to the public over multiple media like mobile, internet, TV, radio, social media, etc. With the completion of the project, it will not only save precious human lives but also make the country disaster-resilient.

== History ==
The Centre for Development of Telematics was established in August 1984 as an autonomous body. Its goal was to develop telecommunication technology to meet the needs of the Indian telecommunication network.

Sam Pitroda started the C-DOT as an autonomous telecom R&D organisation. In the initial years, a telecom revolution in rural India was responsible for all-around socio-economic development through global connectivity. As part of its development process, C-DOT spawned equipment manufacturers and component vendors. Research and development facilities were located at its Delhi and Bangalore campuses.

Within a short time, telecom switching products suited to Indian conditions appeared in the form of small rural automatic exchanges (RAXs) and medium-sized switches as SBMs for towns. This was followed by higher-capacity digital switches known as main automatic exchanges (MAXs). C-DOT technology spread across the country through its licensed manufacturers.

Beginning with digital switching systems, C-DOT developed products for optical, satellite, and wireless communication from circuit switching technology, ATM, and next-generation networks. From a purely hardware development centre, it diversified into development of telecom software like IN, NMS, Data Clearing House and from a protected environment of a closed market to an open and competitive market.

While developing the RAX/MAX digital switches, C-DOT also evolved processes and procedures for manufacturing the switches in Indian factories, which set up an Indian manufacturing vendor base. Later, C-DOT projects included central monitoring systems for telecom security for the Indian government.

Presently, C-DOT is implementing Common Alerting Protocol (CAP) in India to send out early warnings to the public through mobiles. CAP enables the dissemination of messages to the target population without the intervention of service providers. The State of Kerala has used the platform effectively to send out as many as 11.4 lakhs precautionary messages during the Floods. Kerala used it again when Cyclone Gaja crossed over Kerala.

C-DOT has developed the Fibre Fault Localization System (FFLS), which detects and locates the fibre fault along with the fault location on the GIS map.

== C-DOT's role in Surveillance ==
In 2014, the non-profit group Reporters without Borders published their annual report on countries which are "Enemies of the Internet and/or under surveillance", in which India was labelled as a country with widespread ongoing governmental surveillance of its citizens with little oversight. C-DOT was among the international agencies listed with a mandate of surveillance of Indian citizens and other network traffic within India. C-DOT is working on the project called CMS, which is similar to the PRISM project of the NSA.

== Products ==
- XGS-PON
- C-Sat-Fi
- CiSTB
- CTX 1000: MPLS Router
- CG RAN
- PM Wani
- RAX : Rural Automatic Exchange is a small 256 lines switch for landlines that helped spread telecom to rural parts of India
- MAX : Main automatic exchange
- Transmission Equipment
- TDMA Point to Multipoint Radio
- GPON
- DWDM
- SGRAN
- LTE-A
- Softswitch
- NGN
- Router
- BBWT
- Intelligent Networks
- Satellite Wifi
- Interoperable Set Top Box
- MAX-NG
- IMS
- LMG
- LAG
- Media Server
- Transcoder
- 4G
- 5G
- IPlogger
- Trinetra Unified Enterprise Security Solution

== Software ==
- CAP compliant Location Based Disaster Early Warning System
- Network management systems
- [CDOT'S Common Service Platform] for M2M applications
- EMS
- Fibre Fault Localisation System
- Tele-Plannet- GIS based OFC Network Planner.
- Intelligent networks

== Joint ventures ==
- ITI Ltd.
- C-DOT Alcatel Lucent Research Center(CARC)
- United Telecoms Limited
- Vanu, Inc.
- Communications Research Centre (CRC)
- XALTED Information Systems Private Ltd.
- C-DoT, VVDN Tech, WiSig Networks sign pact to jointly develop 5G solution

== See also ==
- Telematics
