= Bharat Broadband Network =

Indian central public sector undertaking

Bharat Broadband Network Limited (India Broadband Network Limited)
- Type: Central Public Sector Undertaking
- Industry: Broadband
- Founded: 25 February 2012; 14 years ago
- Defunct: 26 September 2022; 3 years ago
- Fate: Merged in BSNL
- Headquarters: New Delhi, India
- Area served: India
- Key people: Jyotiraditya Scindia (Cabinet Minister for Communications); Sarvesh Singh, IRSSE (Chairman & MD)
- Services: Internet
- Owner: Department of Telecommunications, Ministry of Communications, Government of India
- Website: bbnl.nic.in

BharatNet, also known as Bharat Broadband Network Limited (BBNL), (transl. India Broadband Network Limited) was an Indian central public sector undertaking, set up by the Department of Telecommunications, a department under the Ministry of Communications of the Government of India for the establishment, management, and operation of the National Optical Fibre Network to provide a minimum of 100 Mbit/s broadband connectivity to all 250,000-gram panchayats in the country, covering nearly 625,000 villages, by improving the middle layer of nation-wide broadband internet in India to achieve the goal of Digital India.

BharatNet Phase-I, connecting 100,000 village councils covering 300,000 villages, was completed by December 2017. BharatNet Phase-II will be completed by 31-March-2023 to connect the remaining 150,000 village councils covering 325,000 villages in 16 states (July 2021 update). The last mile connectivity, with a total of 700,000 Wi-Fi hotspots to cover all 625,000 villages of India by adding 2 to 5 Wi-Fi hotspots per gram panchayat and a minimum of one Wi-Fi hotspot per village, have been created by connecting high-speed 4G base tower stations of commercial telecom operators to BharatNet, whereby commercially non-viable Wi-Fi hotspots will be subsidized by the union government grant of ₹36 billion (equivalent to ₹50 billion, US$520 million or €460 million in 2023) to sustain the operation.

BharatNet is the world's largest rural broadband connectivity program, which is built under the Make in India initiative with no involvement of foreign companies. It is both an enabler and a beneficiary of other key government schemes, such as Digital India, Make in India, the National e-Governance Plan, UMANG, Bharatmala, Sagarmala, Parvatmala, the dedicated freight corridors, industrial corridors, UDAN-RCS and Amrit Bharat Station Scheme.

== History ==
=== Origin and slow pace of implementation (2011) ===
On 25 October 2011, the Government of India approved the National Optical Fibre Network (NOFN) initiative, later renamed as BharatNet, to connect all 250,000 gram panchayats in the country, covering nearly 625,000 villages, by utilizing the existing optical fibre network and extending it to the gram panchayats. To achieve this, Bharat Broadband Network was incorporated as a Special Purpose Vehicle (SPV) on 25 February 2012 under the Companies Act, 1956. Between 2011 and 2014, project did not take off as planned, and only 350 km of optical fibre, out of 300,000 km optical fibre network needed for the Phase-I, was laid. Between 2014 and 2017, the original Phase-I target of laying 300,000 km of optical fibre was completed under the new BJP government.

=== Implementation boost in 2014 ===
The BharatNet project picked up pace under the Digital India initiative after Prime Minister Narendra Modi came to power, he renamed the project as the "BharatNet", made several changes to expedite the project, significantly enhanced the BharatNet funding to several billion dollars under the Digital India, set ambitious time-bound implementations deadlines, appointed government public sector units (BSNL, RailTel, and PowerGrid Corp) for the swift implementation and monitoring, and to bypass the right of way issues for laying the optical fiber cable network the existing government-owned roads, rail lines, and power lines were used. Bangalore-based United Telecoms Limited won the bid, being almost 80% lower than the second-lowest bidder ITI Limited, followed by Tejas, STL, etc. BharatNet collaborated with other government entities such as C-DOT, Telecommunications Consultants India Limited, and National Informatics Centre for the design and rollout plan of BharatNet NOFN Project. BharatNet assigned the execution work of network rollout to several other Government of India Public Sector Units, namely BSNL, RailTel, and Power Grid Corporation of India. Project was rolled out as a collaboration between the Union Government (to provide broadband connectivity at sub-district Block-level), state governments (optical fibre to gram panchayat level,) and private sector companies (Wi-Fi hotspots in each village and connections to the individual homes). Union government total share is ₹450 billion (equivalent to ₹630 billion, US$6.6 billion or €5.8 billion in 2023), the rest will be funded by the respective state governments.

=== Implementation partners ===
There are 36 states and union territories of India, including 28 states and 9 UTs. BSNL was awarded work for 18 of these, RailTel received work in 8 and Power Grid Corporation of India in 5. BSNL was awarded work for 18+ states and UTs, namely Andaman and Nicobar Islands, Assam, Bihar, Chandigarh, Chhattisgarh, Haryana, Jammu and Kashmir, Karnataka, Kerala, Lakshadweep, Tamil Nadu, Madhya Pradesh, Maharashtra, Punjab, Rajasthan, Sikkim, Uttar Pradesh (divided into two projects, UP East and UP West), Uttarakhand and West Bengal. RailTel was awarded work for 8+ states and UTs, namely Arunachal Pradesh, Gujarat, Nagaland, Manipur, Mizoram, Meghalaya, Puducherry and Tripura. Power Grid Corporation of India was awarded work for 5 states, namely Andhra Pradesh, Himachal Pradesh, Jharkhand, Odisha and Telangana. Delhi is included with Phase-I BSNL work for Haryana. Goa is also included with Phase-I BSNL work for Maharashtra. Dadra and Nagar Haveli and Daman and Diu are included with Phase-II work for RailTel. Tripura is likely included with Phase-II RailTel work for the Northeast India.

== Project features ==
=== Benefits ===
BharatNet will provide more employment opportunities, improved service delivery (online e-gram panchayat services, e-governance, e-education, e-health, e-medicine, e-grievances, e-agriculture, e-citizen, etc.), and an impetus to the Make in India, Digital India and Startup India initiatives. According to Morgan Stanley's research, of India's 33% internet penetration in November 2017 only 15% and 2% of total internet users use online shopping and retail shopping respectively, estimated to go up to 78% penetration, 62% online shoppers and 15% online retail shopper respectively by 2027.

As per study by the ICRIER, every 10% increase in the usage of internet in India will add ₹4.5 trillion (equivalent to ₹6.3 trillion, US$66 billion or €58 billion in 2023) leading to a 3.3% increase in GDP of India, a number that will go up after the completion of Phase-II in March 2019. By the end of BharatNet Phase-II in March 2019, the total current fibre optical network will grow by 100% to 10 million kilometers. This 100% increment in the fibre optic network would result in several hundred percent increment in the internet usage when in addition to 625,000 villages (each with minimum 100 Mbit/s), 2,500,000 government institutions and 5,000,000 households will also be connected to the BharatNet broadband by the time it is completed.

To put the potential gains things in perspective, during the early phase of the project in 2018, India had a population of 1.3 billion people (1.36 billion in 2021), 1.23 billion Aadhaar digital biometric identities, 1.21 billion mobile phones, 446 million smartphones, 560 million internet users (800 million in 2021), 35% internet penetration (57% in 2021), and 51% growth in e-commerce. BharatNet has stated goal of 100 Mbit/s internet speed, and in Q1 2020 India ranked 3rd with 15.34 Mbit/s wireless/mobile internet speed and 70th with 55.76 Mbit/s fixed broadband speed (also see countries by Internet connection speed). BharatNet will expedite broadband and smartphone penetration and speed, and its multiplier impact on the economy.

=== Funding ===
The government has discounted the bulk BharatNet bandwidth rates to the commercial telecom operators by 76% to enable them to offer the highly discounted, affordable, competitive, and commercially viable BharatNet-enabled wireless cellular 4G broadband deals to the rural customers. The ₹450 billion (equivalent to ₹630 billion, US$6.6 billion or €5.8 billion in 2023) union government share of funding will come from the Universal Services Obligation Fund of the Department of Telecommunications. It will be rolled out with the additional funding by state governments to connect all gram panchayats in India.

=== Make in India ===
Both the optical fibre and the Gigabit-capable passive optical network broadband equipment, made to account for the dust and power outage issues in the rural areas, are made in India by C-DOT with no involvement of foreign companies. GPON products (see below) supplied by United Telecoms Limited (UTL) which are manufactured in India and the technology is indigenously developed by Centre for Development of Telematics (C-DOT).

== Bharat Net as middle layer ==
=== GPON fiber deployment ===
C-DOT had also inked technology transfer pacts with six Indian vendors, which include ITI Limited, Tejas Networks, VMC, Sai Systems, UTL, and SM Creative to manufacture the gear on winning the contracts.

UTL emerged as the competitive bid winner and obtained the GPON supply contract for a value of approximately Rs 1000 Cr. The companies like ITI Ltd, Tejas Networks, Sterlite, ZTE and Larsen & Toubro lost this deal to UTL. The rollout of GPON is being carried out, and it is expected that by March 2015, around 60000 villages will be connected.

Once all the gram panchayats have been connected by the dedicated fibre optical network, the last mile connectivity to all villages will be provided by the commercial telecom operators by expanding the current national network of 38,000 Wi-Fi hotspots to 700,000 Wi-Fi hotspots to cover all 625,000 villages in India. ₹36 billion (equivalent to ₹50 billion, US$520 million or €460 million in 2023), union government subsidy support will be given to the telecom service operators for rolling out Wi-Fi hotspots in commercially non-viable villages. BharatNet has offered bulk broadband bandwidth at 75% discounted rates to the commercial telecom operators so that they can offer deeply discounted monetised competitive deals to the rural wireless broadband customers. Commercial operators Reliance Jio, Bharti Airtel, Idea Cellular and Vodafone have already connected their 4G-based-broadband base towers to BharatNet at various locations to provide the high speed last mile wireless broadband connectivity.

The central government will set up sufficient Wi-Fi hotspots to cover 100 million citizens by 2020, and a tender will be floated for this soon (as of November 2017). Additionally, Indian Railways will provide Wi-Fi hotspots, limited free access, and unlimited paid access, at 600 major stations by March 2018 and all of its 8,500 stations by March 2019 with an outlay of ₹7 billion (US$73 million), with 1,200 large stations catering to the rail passengers and the remaining 7,300 stations catering to both rail passengers and local population in remote and rural areas, including facilities to access government services or e-purchase of commercial products (c. 7 Jan 2018).

HRD ministry has instructed 50,000 colleges and technical institutions in India to offer free Wi-Fi to students and staff with a capped free data quota, after which data will have to be purchased. Out of these Reliance Jio has offered to deploy free Wi-Fi connectivity to 38,000 colleges, which has been supported by Telecom Regulatory Authority of India (TRAI) and the Department of Telecommunications (DoT).

Some Startups, such as Velmenni Research, under the Startup India, are working on solutions to offer Li-Fi access via LED lights at homes at a speed 100 faster than ordinary WI-FI bandwidth.

== Implementation ==
BharatNet was a middle layer for providing broadband connectivity across all Community Development Blocks (CDB), 250,000 village gram panchayats covering 630,000 inhabited villages of states and union territories of India. As of July 2021, Phase-I was complete and 150,000 Gram Panchayats and associated villages had been service ready with 5.09 lakh km of Optical Fibre Cable already laid, the 29,500 crore (US$4 billion) PPP tender for remaining nearly 100,000 gram panchayats and all the individual inhabited villages under hose panchayats spread across 16 states was floated in 2021 with target date for broadband connectivity of 2023.

=== BharatNet Phase-I (Completed: Dec 2017) ===
BharatNet Phase-I, across 13 states and UTs, was completed in December 2017 with the Phase-I union government funding share of ₹110 billion (equivalent to ₹150 billion, US$1.6 billion or €1.4 billion in 2023). It connected 100,000 gram panchayat, covering 300,000 villages by laying 300,000 km of optical fibre network. 13 states and UTs in this phase were: Andaman and Nicobar Islands, Chandigarh, Delhi, Goa, Haryana, Karnataka, Kerala, Lakshadweep, Manipur, Meghalaya, Puducherry, Sikkim and West Bengal.

To provide the last mile connectivity for the 100,000-gram panchayats in Phase I, contracts were signed to connect 30,500 village panchayats by Vodafone, 30,000 village panchayats by Reliance Jio. 2,000 by Vodafone and 1,000 by Idea Cellular, these Wi-Fi hotspots were activated after connecting BharatNet fibre optics OLT to commercial operators' cell phone base stations. (Latest weekly update)

=== BharatNet Phase-II (Target: March 2023) ===
BharatNet Phase-II will connect the remaining nearly 145,000 gram panchayats covering 325,000 villages through an additional 1 million km of optical fibre. Phase-II commenced with the union government funding share of ₹340 billion (equivalent to ₹480 billion, US$5.0 billion or €4.4 billion in 2023), with the current 250 km per day pace of optical fibre network roll out, which needs to be raised to 500 km per day to achieve the completion target of March 2019.

DoT will invest ₹107.43 billion (US$1.1 billion) on BharatNet in Northeast India, including erecting 6,673 towers to connect 8,621 villages at the cost of ₹53.36 billion (US$550 million) and additional 4,240 gram panchayats by satellite broadband connectivity.

== Merger of BSNL and BBNL ==
On 27 July 2022, the cabinet approved the merger of BBNL with Bharat Sanchar Nigam Limited. The merger was complete by late 2022.

== See also ==
- Common Service Centres
- Digital India
- Electronics and semiconductor manufacturing industry in India
- Internet in India
- Telecommunications in India
- List of countries by number of broadband Internet subscriptions
- List of countries by number of Internet users
- List of countries by Internet connection speeds
- List of countries by smartphone penetration
