= Viral transport medium =

Solution used to preserve virus specimens

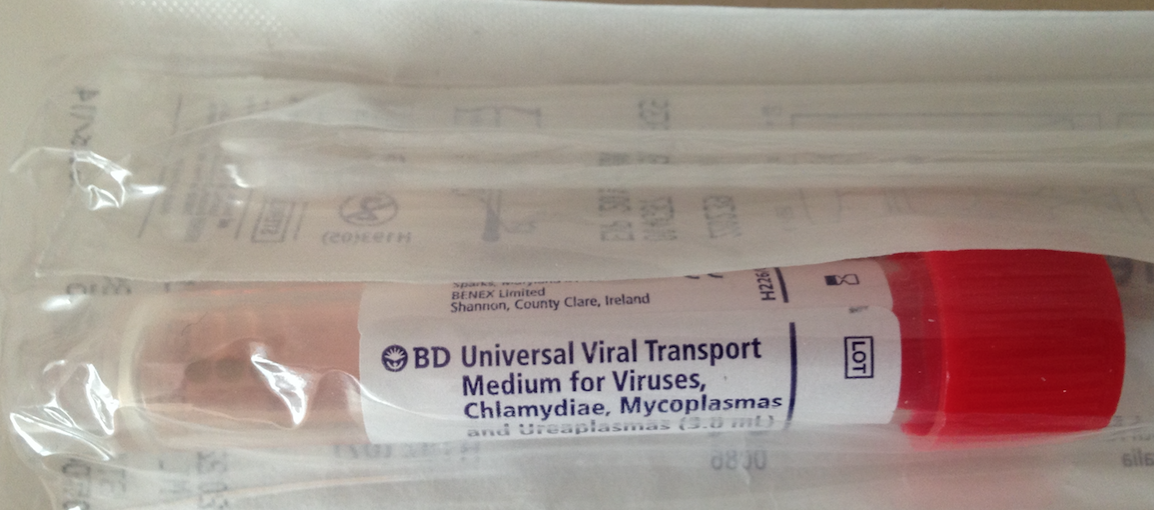
A vial of viral transport medium

Viral transport medium (VTM) is a solution used to preserve virus specimens after collection so that they can be transported and analysed in a laboratory at a later time. Unless stored in an ultra low temperature freezer or in liquid nitrogen, virus samples, and especially RNA virus samples, are prone to degradation. However, such cooling equipment is seldom available in the field due to their cumbersome size, weight, and in the case of freezers, high energy consumption. Hence, there is a need for VTM; a chemical preservative that can be used at ambient temperature. Chemical components may include saline solution, phosphate-buffered saline (PBS), or fetal bovine serum (FBS). VTM must be sterile to avoid introducing contamination to the specimen.

In the United States, the FDA and CDC publish guidelines for VTM production.
