= United Telecoms Limited =

Indian telecommunication equipment company

- Industry: Telecommunications equipment
- Founded: 1984
- Headquarters: Bangalore, Karnataka, India
- Products: Telecommunications, Transmission Equipment, Mobile phones, Network Management System and Training
- Website: www.utlindia.com

United Telecoms Limited is a five decade old diversified business group, one of the first business houses to bring cellular services to the country. UTL pioneered the e-Governance initiative that creates a high-tech interface between the government and its citizens, which has been successfully adopted by many state governments. Today, the footprint extends over 60-plus nations across South Asia, Africa, America and Europe. Telecom R&D is primarily focused on DWDM with a team of 120 engineers.

UTL has a history of executing large DWDM orders for Indian government by winning tenders against major global companies.

== Products ==
It is a Bangalore based private company that does business in optical transmission, exchange, MPLS core, access, mobile phones, and telecommunications software. GPON products for Bharat Broadband Network is supplied by the company. They are manufactured in India using technology developed by Centre for Development of Telematics (C-DOT).
