= Department of Telecommunications =

Indian government department

Department of Telecommunications (DoT)
- Parent Agency - Ministry of Communications

- Department of Telecommunications

Department overview
- Formed: 1985; 41 years ago
- Jurisdiction: Government of India
- Headquarters: New Delhi, India
- Minister responsible: Jyotiraditya Scindia, Minister of Communications
- Deputy Minister responsible: Devusinh Chauhan, Minister of state for Ministry of Communications
- Department executive: Amit Agrawal, IAS
- Parent department: Ministry of Communications
- Website: www.dot.gov.in

The Department of Telecommunications, abbreviated to DoT, is a department of the Ministry of Communications of the executive branch of the Government of India.

== History ==
Telecom services have been recognized the world-over as an important tool for socio-economic development for a nation and hence telecom infrastructure is treated as a crucial factor to realize the socio-economic objectives in India. Accordingly, the Department of Telecom has been formulating developmental policies for the accelerated growth of the telecommunication services. The department is also responsible for grant of licenses for various telecom services like Unified Access Service Internet and VSAT service. The department is also responsible for frequency management in the field of radio communication in close coordination with the international bodies. It also enforces wireless regulatory measures by monitoring wireless transmission of all users in the country.

The Digital Communications Commission, an apex inter-departmental decision-making body within the department formed in 1989 as the Telecom Commission and renamed in 2018, was dissolved with effect from 19 September 2026. Its approval functions were transferred to the telecom secretary, the minister or an Expenditure Finance Committee depending on the value involved. The Commission, which included senior officials from NITI Aayog, the finance ministry and other departments, had decided on telecom policy matters including spectrum pricing and recommendations of the Telecom Regulatory Authority of India, and held its last meeting on 3 September 2026 to finalise a decision on satellite communication spectrum.

== Services ==
- Launched Sanchar Saathi portal in 2023.
- Defence Communication Network - launched on 30 June 2016.

== Statutory Bodies ==
- Telecom Disputes Settlement and Appellate Tribunal(TDSAT)
- Telecom Regulatory Authority of India(TRAI)

== Attached Offices ==
- Telecommunication Engineering Centre(TEC)
- Universal Service Obligation Fund(USOF)

== Subordinate Offices ==
- Wireless Monitoring Organization

== Field Offices ==
- Director General Telecom
- Controller of Communication Accounts(CCA)

== Autonomous Bodies ==
- Centre for Development of Telematics(C-DOT)

== Training Institutes ==
- National Telecommunications Institute for Policy Research Innovation Training(NTIPRIT)
- National Institute of Communication Finance(NICF)

== Specialised Units ==
The following units function under the DoT:

- Telecom Enforcement Resource and Monitoring (TERM) Cells, formerly Vigilance Telecom Monitoring (VTM)
- Wireless Planning & Coordination Wing (WPC)
- Telephone Advisory Committees

== Central Public Sector Undertakings ==
- Bharat Sanchar Nigam Limited (BSNL)
- Indian Telephone Industries Limited (ITI)
- Telecommunications Consultants India Limited (TCIL)
- Bharat Broadband Network Limited (BBNL)

== See also ==
Central Civil Services

- Indian Communication Finance Service

Central Engineering Services

- Indian Telecommunication Service
- Indian Radio Regulatory Service
