= Manoj Prasad =

Indian plant geneticist and molecular biologist

- Born: 16 December 1970 (age 55); Ballia, Uttar Pradesh, India
- Education: Pannalal Institution; Ramakrishna Mission Vivekananda Centenary College; University of Calcutta; Leibniz Institute of Plant Genetics and Crop Plant Research
- Known for: Studies on stress biology of plants
- Awards: 2006 ISCA Prof. Hira Lal Chakravarty Award; 2014 N-BIOS Prize
- Scientific career
- Fields: Plant genetics; Virology; Stress Biology
- Workplaces: Chaudhary Charan Singh University; National Institute of Plant Genome Research; Delhi University

Manoj Prasad (born 16 December 1970) is an Indian plant geneticist, molecular biologist and working as a professor in Department of Genetics at Delhi University. Previously, he worked as a senior scientist and JC Bose National Fellow at the National Institute of Plant Genome Research (NIPGR) from 2004 to 2023. Known for his research on the stress biology of plants and virology, he is an elected fellow of the Indian National Science Academy, the National Academy of Sciences, India, the National Academy of Agricultural Sciences and the Indian Virological Society and was a recipient of the Alexander von Humboldt Fellowship. The Department of Biotechnology of the Government of India awarded him the National Bioscience Award for Career Development, one of the highest Indian science awards, for his contributions to biosciences, in 2014.

== Biography ==
Manoj Prasad was born on 16 December 1970 in Ballia in the Indian state of Uttar Pradesh. After completing early schooling at Pannalal Institution in Kalyani, West Bengal, he pursued he graduated with honours in science from Ramakrishna Mission Vivekananda Centenary College, Kolkata in 1992 and secured a master's degree from the prestigious University College of Science campus of University of Calcutta in 1994. Subsequently, he did his doctoral research at the same university from where he earned a PhD in 1999. His career started as a research fellow at the Chaudhary Charan Singh University, Meerut in 1998 and in 2000, he moved to Leibniz Institute of Plant Genetics and Crop Plant Research (IPK), Gatersleben as a post-doctoral research fellow where he stayed until 2003. Returning to India, he joined the National Institute of Plant Genome Research (NIPGR), New Delhi in 2004 as a staff scientist Grade III and continued to serve the institute as a staff scientist Grade VI until October 2023. In November 2023 he became full time Professor in Department of Genetics at Delhi University.

Prasad lives in Jawaharlal Nehru University campus, along Aruna Asaf Ali Marg in New Delhi.

== Professional profile ==
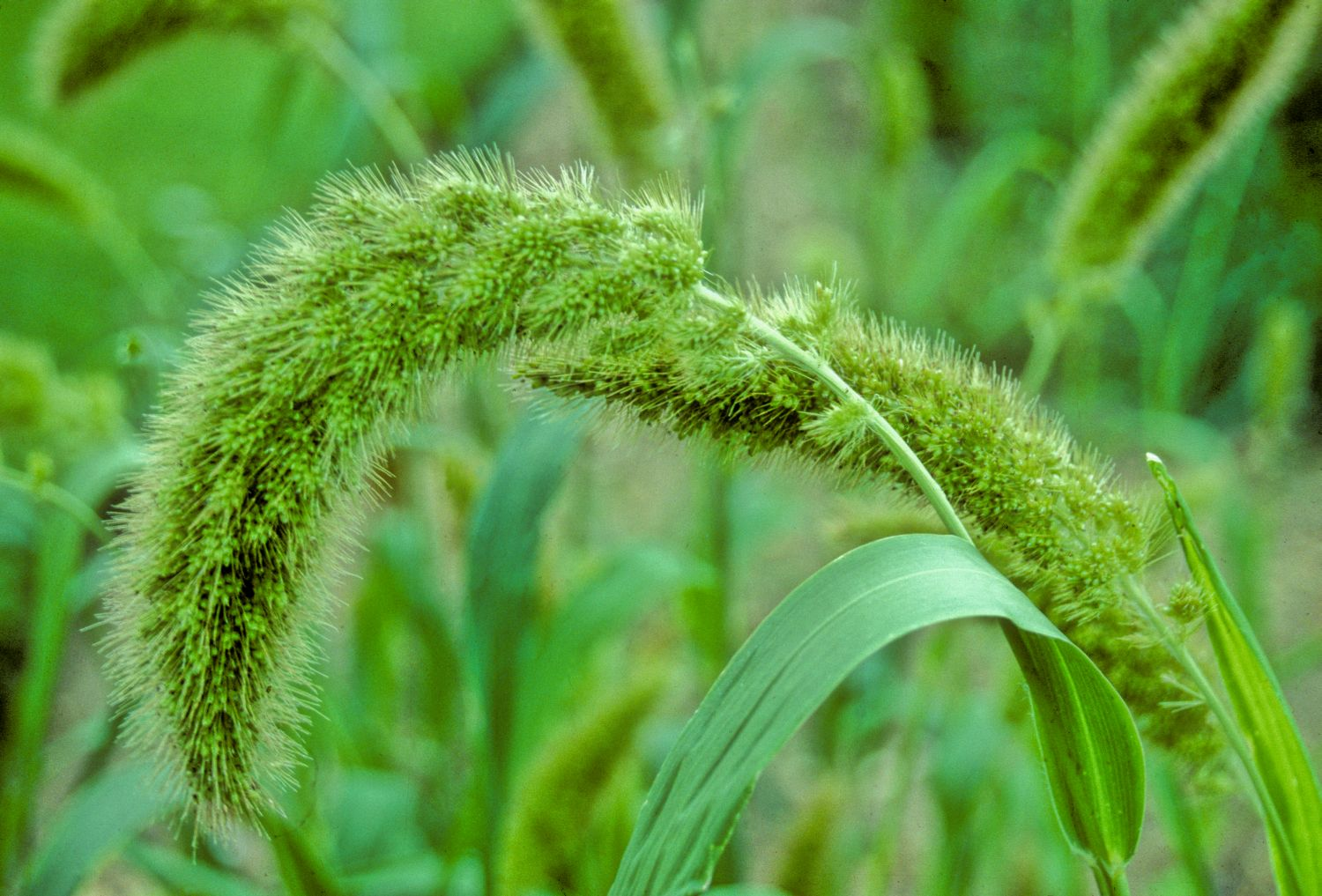
Foxtail millet

Prasad focuses his studies on crop science and his laboratory at NIPGR is involved in the studies related to salt and drought stress as well as abiotic stress in foxtail millet (Setaria italica) and genetic studies of tomato leaf curl virus (ToLCV). His studies have been documented by way of a number of articles (Note: Please see Selected bibliography section) and ResearchGate, an online repository of scientific articles has listed 219 of them. He edited the book, The Foxtail Millet Genome, and has contributed chapters to books published by others.

Prasad is a former member of the editorial boards of journals such as Scientific Reports, The Plant Cell and Molecular Biology Reports and sits on the editorial boards of BMC Plant Biology, PLoS ONE, Plant Molecular Biology Reporter, Plant Cell Reports, Tissue and Organ Culture, Acta Physiologiae Plantarum, Plant Breeding, and Journal of Genetics. He was also one of the coordinators of the International Climate-Resilient Crop Genomics Consortium (ICRCGC), held in January 2012, at San Diego, California.

== Awards and honors ==
Prasad, who held the National Merit Scholarship of the Government of India during his master's studies (1992–94), received the Alexander von Humboldt fellowship in 2000. The National Academy of Agricultural Sciences (NAAS) selected him as a Young Scientist in 2003 and as an Associate in 2006, the same year as he was selected for the Biotechnology Overseas Associateship of the Department of Biotechnology. He was awarded the Prof. Hira Lal Chakravarty Award by the Indian Science Congress Association. The National Academy of Sciences, India elected him as a fellow in 2012, and he became an elected fellow of the National Academy of Agricultural Sciences the next year. The Department of Biotechnology (DBT) of the Government of India awarded him the National Bioscience Award for Career Development, one of the highest Indian science awards in 2014. He was elected by the Indian Virological Society and the Indian National Science Academy in 2015 and 2017 respectively. In between, he was selected for the TATA Innovation Fellowship by the Department of Biotechnology in 2016.

== Selected bibliography ==
=== Books ===
- Manoj Prasad (25 November 2017). The Foxtail Millet Genome. Springer International Publishing. ISBN 978-3-319-65617-5.

=== Chapters ===
- Girdhar K. Pandey, Manoj Prasad, Amita Pandey, Maik Boehmer (Eds); Mukesh K. Meena, Sanjay Ghawana, Vikas Dwivedi, Ansuman Roy, Debasis Chattopadhyay (Chapter authors) (8 August 2016). "Expression of chickpea CIPK25 enhances root growth and tolerance to dehydration and salt stress in transgenic tobacco". Abiotic Stress Signaling in Plants: Functional Genomic Intervention. Frontiers Media SA. pp. 205–215. ISBN 978-2-88919-891-7.

=== Articles ===
- Varshney, R.K.; Prasad, M.; Kota, R.; Sigmund, R.; Börner A, Valkoun; J; Scholz, U.; Stein, N.; Graner, A. (31 July 2012). "Functional molecular markers in barley: Development and applications". Czech Journal of Genetics and Plant Breeding. 41 (Special Issue): 128–133. doi:10.17221/6152-cjgpb. ISSN 1212-1975.
- Yadav, Chandra Bhan; Pandey, Garima; Muthamilarasan, Mehanathan; Prasad, Manoj (2018). Plant Genetics and Molecular Biology. Advances in Biochemical Engineering/Biotechnology. Vol. 164. Springer, Berlin, Heidelberg. pp. 237–261. doi:10.1007/10_2017_51. ISBN 978-3-319-91312-4. PMID 29356846.
- Pandey, Saurabh; Sahu, Pranav P; Kulshreshtha, Ritika; Prasad, Manoj (2018). Role of host transcription factors in modulating defense response during plant-virus interaction. Caister Academic Press. doi:10.21775/9781910190814.02. ISBN 9781910190814.

== See also ==
- Molecular marker
- Transcription
