= D.A.V. Post Graduate College, Dehradun =

College in Dehradun, Uttarakhand, India

Dayanand Anglo Vedic Post Graduate College
- Other name: D.A.V. PG College
- Motto: "तमसो मा ज्योतिर्गमय"
- Established: 1948; 78 years ago
- Affiliations: Hemwati Nandan Bahuguna Garhwal University
- Principal: Prof. Kaushal kumar
- Academic staff: 140
- Students: 12500
- Location: DAV College Road, Karanpur, Dehradun, Uttarakhand, 248001, India; 30.32872°N 78.05664°E
- Website: www.davpgcollege.in

D.A.V. (Post Graduate) College Dehradun is a government aided college in the city of Dehradun, Uttarakhand, India.

== History ==
The Arya Samaj evening school was transferred from Meerut to the valley of Dehradun in the year 1892. It was later developed into the D.A.V. School. It became Dayanand Anglo-Vedic Postgraduate College, Dehradun, in 1948.

== Affiliation ==
- Agra University-1948
- HNB Garhwal University, Srinagar, Uttarakhand.

=== Revocation of College Affiliation ===
In 2023, the Executive Council of Hemwati Nandan Bahuguna Garhwal Central University announced the termination of affiliation for ten colleges, including DAV PG College, for the 2023–24 academic session. The decision affected several government-aided non-government colleges in the Garhwal region.

The college management challenged the decision in the Uttarakhand High Court, which stayed the disaffiliation order, allowing the affiliation to continue pending further legal proceedings.

== Academics ==
The college offers undergraduate and postgraduate programs in the disciplines of arts, commerce, science, and law. Courses are available up to the master's level in select subjects.

Academic programs are conducted in accordance with the regulations and curriculum prescribed by HNB Garhwal University and UGC.

== Controversies ==
=== 2024 boundary wall collapse ===
In 2024, a section of the boundary wall of DAV PG College, Dehradun, collapsed, resulting in the death of a 24-year-old woman and injuries to her brother. The incident occurred in the evening while they were passing by the wall.

Following the incident, a case was registered against the college management under Sections 304A and 336 of the Indian Penal Code in connection with alleged negligence. The incident led to student protests, and the college remained closed the following day.

=== 2017 fund probe and earlier enquiry ===
In 2017, the Uttarakhand Higher Education Minister ordered a probe into missing funds of around ₹22 crore, after student organisations alleged that records for a corpus created for college maintenance and facilities were not provided by the management. The investigation aimed to clarify the status of the funds and ensure their proper use.

Earlier, in 2015, student leaders met the then Chief Minister of Uttarakhand, Harish Rawat to raise concerns about alleged irregularities at the college, leading to an enquiry ordered by the state government.

=== Allegations of Irregular Admissions ===
In 2015, tensions arose at DAV PG College following allegations of a fraudulent student admission, leading to protest by student leaders. Demonstrators demanded the resignation of then principal Devendra Bhasin and called for a high-level investigation into the college's admission practices and financial activities over the past decade. The controversy centered on the admission of a student who allegedly did not meet eligibility criteria, though the principal denied involvement and a magisterial inquiry was initiated. Protests included demonstrations at the college gate, and students threatened further agitation if action was not taken. While some faculty members expressed support for the principal, student representatives also raised broader concerns about past admission irregularities and alleged financial misconduct within the institution.

=== 2010 BCI Compliance Controversy ===
In 2010, the Law Department of DAV College in Dehradun faced criticism for failing to meet norms set by the Bar Council of India, the regulatory body responsible for legal education in India. Reports at the time stated that the department lacked several facilities required under BCI guidelines, including a separate building, large classrooms, a moot court, and a well-equipped library.

During a BCI inspection around that period, individuals who accompanied the inspection team alleged that the college had misled inspectors by showing them another building and presenting classes from other departments as those of the Law Department. College officials reportedly assured the team that the required facilities would be developed in the near future.

Critics claimed that little progress had been made by the time another inspection was expected. The college administration cited financial constraints and relatively low student fees as reasons for delays in building new infrastructure. Supporters of the department argued that the college played an important role in providing affordable legal education and hoped that improvements in faculty and facilities would help the department meet BCI standards.

=== 2026 RTI Request Concerning Institutions Approvals and Safety Compliance ===
In September 2026, an application under the Right to Information (RTI) Act was filed by Abhay Goel, a student at Manipal Academy of Higher Education, seeking information regarding the college's regulatory approvals and institutional safety arrangements. The application reportedly sought details concerning approvals from the Mussoorie Dehradun Development Authority, fire safety equipments, and related compliance matters.

The college declined to provide the requested information, stating that the matters raised in the application did not pertain to public interest. The response attracted criticism on the grounds that the information sought concerning building approvals and fire safety arrangements, matters with potential implications for public safety. Critics also questioned the refusal in light of the college's reported receipt of substantial government funding, arguing that this warranted greater transparency and public accountability.

== Notable alumni ==
- Bachendri Pal (first Indian woman to climb Mount Everest)
- Harbans Kapoor (8-Times and current MLA for Dehradun Cantt. Constituency)
- Ajay Kothiyal (founder of Youth Foundation and member of AAP)
- Sushil Chandra (Chief Election Commissioner of India)
- Akhilesh Kumar Tyagi (plant biologist and former Director of National Institute of Plant Genome Research)
- Vikas Lakhera Director General of the Assam Rifles
- O.P. Bhatt (Chairman of Tata Steel, former chairman of the State Bank of India
- Raghav Juyal (actor, dancer, choreographer and television presenter)
