= Alok Krishna Sinha =

Indian molecular biologist (born 1969)

- Born: 1969 (age 56–57); Jharkhand, India
- Education: Banaras Hindu University; National Botanical Research Institute; University of Regensburg; University of Würzburg
- Known for: Studies on Mitogen-activated protein kinase
- Awards: 2004 DST Young Scientist Award; 2011 ISCA B. C. Deb Memorial Award; 2013 N-BIOS Prize
- Scientific career
- Fields: Molecular biology; Biochemistry; Plant physiology
- Workplaces: National Institute of Plant Genome Research

Alok Krishna Sinha (born 1969) is an Indian molecular biologist, biochemist, plant physiologist and a staff scientist Grade VII at the National Institute of Plant Genome Research (NIPGR). Known for his research on Mitogen-activated protein kinase (MAPK) cascade in plants, he is a three-time Alexander von Humboldt Fellow and an elected fellow of the National Academy of Sciences, India. The Department of Biotechnology of the Government of India awarded him the National Bioscience Award for Career Development, one of the highest Indian science awards, for his contributions to biosciences, in 2013.

== Biography ==
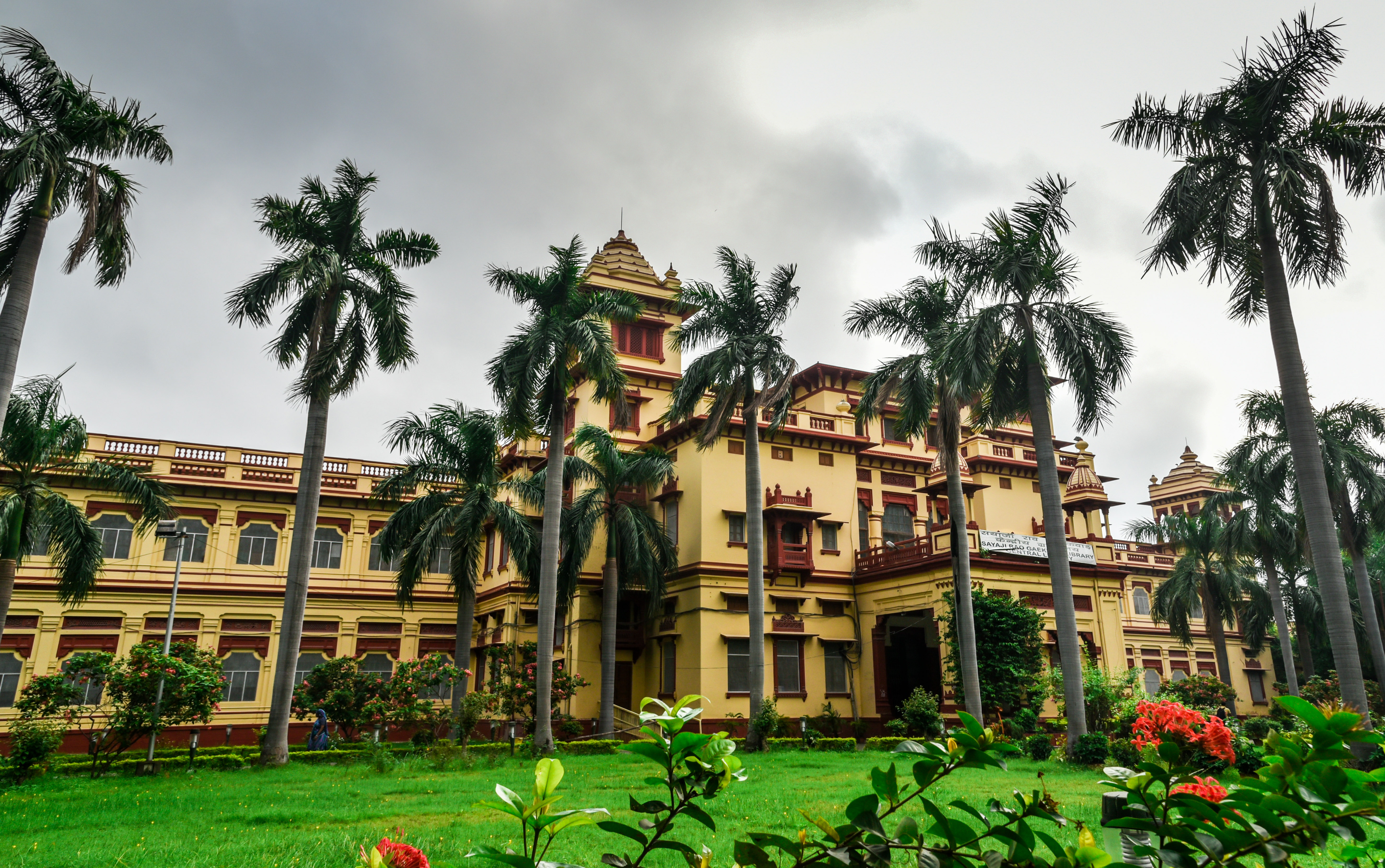
Central Library BHU

Born in 1969 in the Indian state of Uttar Pradesh, Alok Krishna Sinha did his doctoral research at the National Botanical Research Institute, Lucknow which earned him a PhD from Banaras Hindu University. His post-doctoral studies were at the University of Regensburg as an Alexander von Humboldt Fellow and at the University of Würzburg, Germany. Subsequently, he joined the National Institute of Plant Genome Research, New Delhi as a staff scientist where he continues his research, holding the position of a Grade VI scientist.

Sinha lives in NIPGR campus along Aruna Asaf Ali Marg in New Delhi.

== Professional profile ==
Sinha's research is focused on Mitogen-activated protein kinase (MAPK) and its cascading effect on plants. His studies have been documented by way of a number of articles (Note: Please see Selected bibliography section) and ResearchGate, an online repository of scientific articles has listed 119 of them. Besides, he has also contributed chapters to books published by others. He was one of the organizers of the International Congress of Cell Biology, held at Hyderabad in February 2018.

== Awards and honors ==
Sinha, an elected member of the Guha Research Conference (2016), received the Alexander von Humboldt Fellowship in 1998 for a period of two years; he would receive AvH invitation twice more, in 2006 and in 2010. In 2004, he was selected for the Young Scientist Award and for the DAAD fellowship in 2007 by the Department of Science and Technology. He was elected as a fellow by the National Academy of Sciences, India in 2011 and he received the B. C. Deb Memorial Award from Indian Science Congress Association in 2012. The Department of Biotechnology (DBT) of the Government of India awarded him the National Bioscience Award for Career Development, one of the highest Indian science awards in 2013. He is also a 2015 recipient of the TATA Innovation Fellowship of the Department of Biotechnology. He became fellow of Indian National Academy Science (INSA), New Delhi in 2019

== Selected bibliography ==
=== Chapters ===
- Narendra Tuteja; Sarvajeet S. Gill; Renu Tuteja (11 October 2012). Improving Crop Productivity in Sustainable Agriculture. John Wiley & Sons. pp. 137–. ISBN 978-3-527-66519-8.

=== Articles ===
- Jalmi, Siddhi K.; Bhagat, Prakash K.; Verma, Deepanjali; Noryang, Stanzin; Tayyeba, Sumaira; Singh, Kirti; Sharma, Deepika; Sinha, Alok K. (2018). "Traversing the Links between Heavy Metal Stress and Plant Signaling". Frontiers in Plant Science. 9: 12. doi:10.3389/fpls.2018.00012. PMC 5807407. PMID 29459874.
- Thakore, Dhara; Srivastava, Ashok Kumar; Sinha, Alok Krishna (2017). "Mass production of Ajmalicine by bioreactor cultivation of hairy roots of Catharanthus roseus". Biochemical Engineering Journal. 119: 84–91. doi:10.1016/j.bej.2016.12.010. ISSN 1369-703X.
- Jalmi, Siddhi Kashinath; Sinha, Alok Krishna (29 November 2016). "Functional Involvement of a Mitogen Activated Protein Kinase Module, OsMKK3-OsMPK7-OsWRK30 in Mediating Resistance against Xanthomonas oryzae in Rice". Scientific Reports. 6 (1) 37974. Bibcode:2016NatSR...637974J. doi:10.1038/srep37974. PMC 5126639. PMID 27897241.

== See also ==
- MicroRNA
- Xanthomonas oryzae
