= Director General of the Assam Rifles =

Highest-ranking official of the CAPF Assam Rifles

Director General of the Assam Rifles (DGAR)
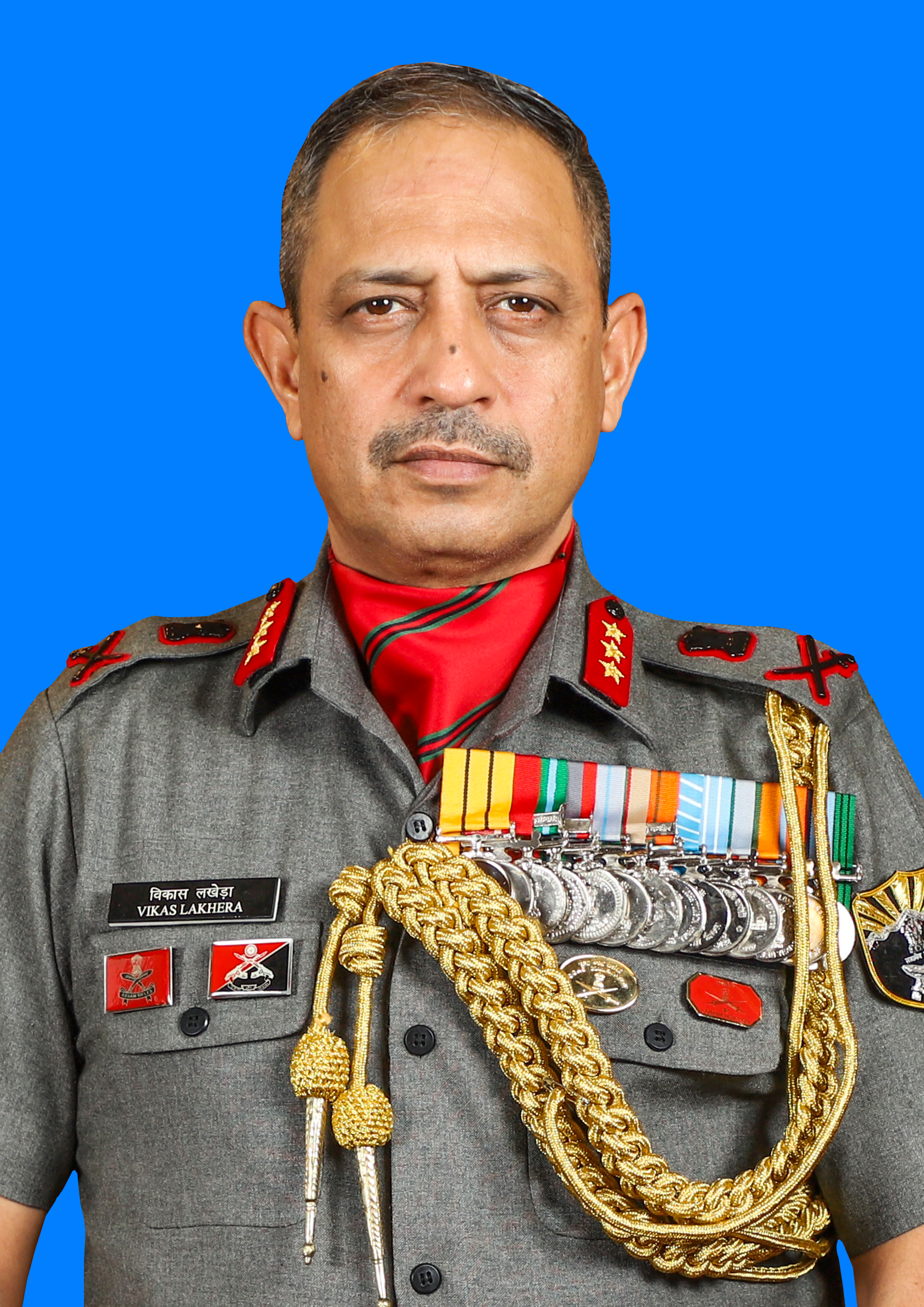
- Incumbent; Lieutenant General Vikas Lakhera, AVSM SM since 1 August 2024
- Formation: 1947; 79 years ago
- First holder: H. G. Bartly, CIE, IP
- Website: Official Website

The Director General of the Assam Rifles (DGAR) is the head of the Assam Rifles. The DGAR has their office in the Headquarters DGAR at Shillong. Appointed by the Government of India, the DGAR reports to the Minister of Home Affairs. The Director General is an Indian Army Officer of the rank of Lieutenant General and is assisted by three Inspector Generals, each holding the rank of Major General, and other senior officers heading various staff appointments. The Additional Director General of the Assam Rifles who is a Major General - ranked officer serves as the Second-in-command to the Director General. The current Director General, Lieutenant General Vikas Lakhera is the 22nd DGAR.

== History ==
The first Director General post-Independence was Mr HG Bartly, CIE, IP who assumed the appointment on 17 September 1947. The first Indian Director General was Colonel Sidhiman Rai, MC appointed on 15 August 1948. The rank of officers holding the appointment of Director General Assam Rifles has been consistently upgraded from Colonel to Brigadier (One star General) to Major General (Two star General) to Lieutenant General (Three star General) now. Indian Army officers on deputation have been holding the appointment of Director General Assam Rifles until date.

== List of directors general ==
| S.No | Rank | Name | Appointment date | Left office | References |
|---|---|---|---|---|---|
| 1 | - | H. G. Bartly, CIE, IP | 17 Sep 1947 | 14 Aug 1948 | |
| 2 | Colonel | Sidhiman Rai, MC | 15 Aug 1948 | 10 Dec 1949 | |
| 3 | Colonel | R. N. D. Frier, MC | 16 Dec 1949 | 29 Feb 1952 | |
| 4 | Brigadier | K. Bhagwati Singh, AVSM | 1 Mar 1952 | 4 May 1954 | |
| 5 | Brigadier | K. S. Katoch, MC | 5 May 1954 | 29 Aug 1955 | |
| 6 | Brigadier | Harbhajan Singh | 7 Sep 1955 | 30 Nov 1957 | |
| 7 | Major General | A. S. Guraya | 1 Feb 1958 | 14 Dec 1965 | |
| 8 | Major General | S. N. Bhatia | 15 Dec 1965 | 15 Feb 1968 | |
| 9 | Major General | V. B. Tuli | 20 Feb 1968 | 19 May 1972 | |
| 10 | Major General | M. G. Hazari, PVSM, AVSM | 30 Mar 1973 | 29 Feb 1976 | |
| 11 | Major General | K. Chiman Singh, PVSM | 1 Mar 1976 | 25 Jun 1979 | |
| 12 | Lieutenant General | Sushil Kumar, PVSM | 1 Sep 1979 | 2 Dec 1981 | |
| 13 | Lieutenant General | J. K. Puri, PVSM, AVSM | 2 Dec 1981 | 29 Nov 1983 | |
| 14 | Lieutenant General | P. E. Menon, PVSM | 30 Nov 1983 | 31 May 1987 | |
| 15 | Lieutenant General | M. K. Lahiri, PVSM | 1 Jun 1987 | 21 Dec 1989 | |
| 16 | Lieutenant General | R. V. Kulkarni, PVSM, UYSM, AVSM | 22 Feb 1990 | 9 Mar 1992 | |
| 17 | Lieutenant General | V. P. Airy, MVC | 18 Mar 1992 | 31 Mar 1993 | |
| 18 | Lieutenant General | Y. M. Bammi, ADC | 15 Jul 1993 | 30 Apr 1995 | |
| 19 | Lieutenant General | T. P. S. Rawat, PVSM, VSM | 19 May 1995 | 30 Apr 1998 | |
| 20 | Lieutenant General | Gurpreet Singh, PVSM | 1 May 1998 | 18 Jan 2001 | |
| 21 | Lieutenant General | G. K. Duggal, PVSM, AVSM, VrC | 19 Jan 2001 | 18 Jan 2003 | |
| 22 | Lieutenant General | H. S. Kanwar, PVSM, AVSM, VSM | 1 Mar 2003 | 30 Apr 2004 | |
| 23 | Lieutenant General | Bhopinder Singh, PVSM, AVSM, VSM | 1 May 2004 | 30 Jun 2006 | |
| 24 | Lieutenant General | Paramjit Singh, PVSM, AVSM, VSM | 6 Jul 2006 | 31 May 2008 | |
| 25 | Lieutenant General | K. S. Yadava, PVSM, AVSM, SM, VSM | 9 Jun 2008 | 30 Sep 2010 | |
| 26 | Lieutenant General | Rameshwar Roy, UVSM, AVSM, YSM | 6 Dec 2010 | 22 Feb 2012 | |
| 27 | Lieutenant General | Ranbir Singh, PVSM, AVSM, SM | 27 Aug 2012 | 31 Mar 2014 | |
| 28 | Lieutenant General | R. K. Rana, SM, VSM | 26 May 2014 | 31 Aug 2015 | |
| 29 | Lieutenant General | H. J. S. Sachdev, PVSM, AVSM, SM, ADC | 1 Sep 2015 | 30 Sep 2016 | |
| 30 | Lieutenant General | Shokin Chauhan, PVSM, AVSM, YSM, SM, VSM | 12 Dec 2016 | 31 Mar 2018 | |
| 31 | Lieutenant General | Sukhdeep Sangwan, AVSM, SM** | 4 May 2018 | 31 May 2021 | |
| 32 | Lieutenant General | Pradeep Chandran Nair, AVSM, YSM | 1 June 2021 | 31 July 2024 | |
| 33 | Lieutenant General | Vikas Lakhera, AVSM, SM | 1 August 2024 | Incumbent | |

== See also ==
- Assam Rifles
- Special Frontier Force
