= Vikas Lakhera =

22nd Director General of the Assam Rifles

Lieutenant General Vikas Lakhera AVSM SM
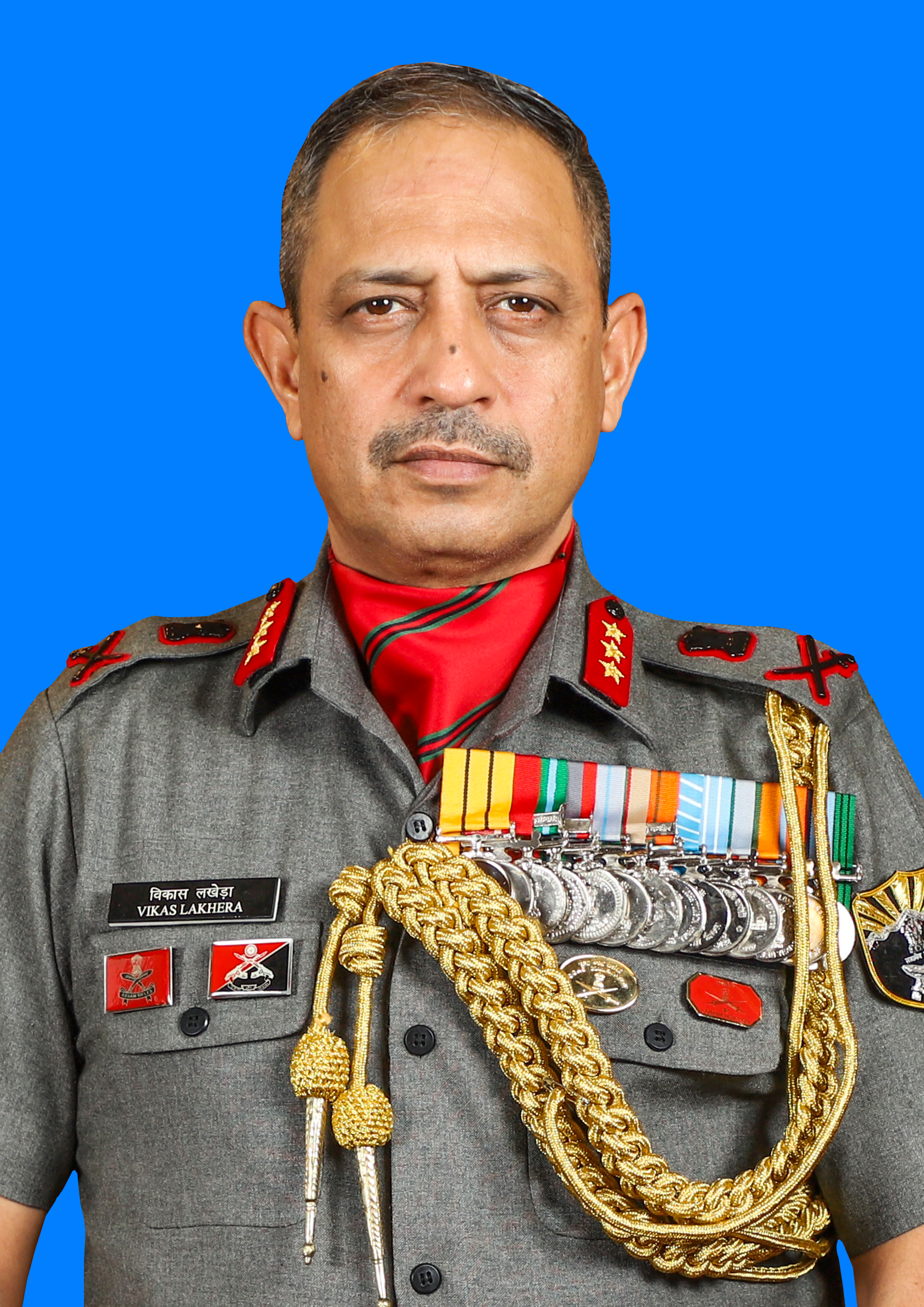
- Lakhera as DG Assam Rifles

Director General of the Assam Rifles
- Incumbent
- Assumed office 01 August 2024
- Preceded by: Pradeep Chandran Nair

Personal details
- Born: 26 February 1969

Military service
- Allegiance: India
- Branch/service: Indian Army
- Years of service: 9 June 1990 – present
- Rank: Lieutenant General
- Unit: 4 Sikh Light Infantry
- Commands: 4 Sikh Light Infantry; 15th Infantry Brigade; Assam Rifles
- Awards: Ati Vishisht Seva Medal; Sena Medal

Lieutenant general Vikas Lakhera, AVSM, SM is a serving officer of the Indian Army who was appointed the 22nd Director General of the Assam Rifles on 1 August 2024.

== Early life and education ==
Lakhera's hails from Uttarakhand (Tehri district) and attended D.A.V. Post Graduate College, Dehradun before joining the Indian Military Academy.

His professional military education includes courses at the Defence Services Staff College (Wellington), the Higher Defence Management Course at the College of Defence Management (Secunderabad), and the National Defence Course at the Royal College of Defence Studies (London). Civil and academic qualifications reported in media coverage include an M.Sc. from Madras University, an M.A. from King's College London and a Master in Management Studies from Osmania University.

== Military career ==
Vikas Lakhera was commissioned into the 4 Sikh Light Infantry on 9 June 1990 via 86th Regular Course. He has served extensively in the northeastern region and in other operational theatres including Jammu & Kashmir.

During his distinguished career, he has held several important command and staff appointments. He commanded his parent battalion, 4 Sikh LI, in Lower Assam under the Red Horn Division, and later commanded an Infantry Brigade at Sriganganagar. He subsequently served as the Inspector General of Assam Rifles (North) headquartered at Kohima, where he was responsible for overseeing counter-insurgency operations and internal security duties in Nagaland and adjoining areas. He also served as Additional Director General of Military Operations (ADGMO), being assigned at the Army Headquarters. His earlier staff appointments include serving as a Division Officer and Tactical Training Officer at the National Defence Academy, Deputy Military Advisor to the General Officer Commanding-in-Chief of the Eastern Command, Director in the Military Operations Directorate, Deputy Commander of an Infantry Brigade, and Brigadier (Q) at Headquarters 4 Corps. His long association with the North-East and extensive operational experience in counter-insurgency operations have been highlighted in multiple official and media reports.

On 1 August 2024, Lt Gen Vikas Lakhera assumed the appointment of Director General, Assam Rifles (DGAR), succeeding Lt Gen Pradeep Chandran Nair. As DGAR, he is the head of the Assam Rifles and is responsible for overseeing internal security, counter-insurgency, and border management operations in India's northeastern region.

== Awards and decorations ==
Lakhera has been awarded the Ati Vishisht Seva Medal, India's second highest peacetime award. He was also awarded the Sena Medal for his gallantry actions in the military.
