= Bhawal Estate =

Zamindari estate

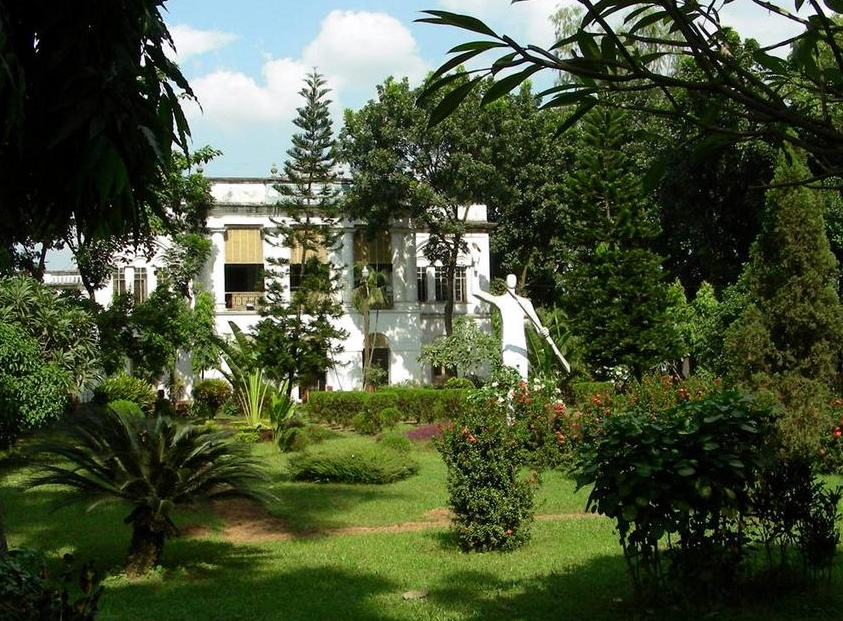
The Bhawal Rajbari and its garden in the foreground (2007); currently this Rajbari is used as the office of the Deputy Commissioner, Gazipur

Bhawal Estate was a large zamindari in Bengal (in modern-day Gazipur, Bangladesh) until it was abolished according to East Bengal State Acquisition and Tenancy Act of 1950.

== History ==
In the late 17th century, Daulat Ghazi was the zamindar of the Ghazi estate of Bhawal. Bala Ram was Diwan of Daulat Ghazi. In 1704, as the consequence of change in the policy of revenue collection, Bala Ram's son Sri Krishna was installed as the zamindar of Bhawal by Murshid Quli Khan. Since then, through acquisitions the zamindari expanded. The family turned into the proprietor of the whole Bhawal pargana after purchasing the zamindari of J. Wise, an indigo grower for Rs 4,46,000.

In 1878, British Raj conferred Raja title to Zamindar Kalinarayan Roy Chowdhury. His son Raja Rajendra Narayan Roy Chowdhury extended the zamindari. Rajendra was married to Rani Bilasmani Devi. They had 3 daughters - Indumayi, Jyotirmayi and Tarinmayi, and 3 sons - Ranendra Narayan, Ramendra Narayan and Rabindra Narayan. Writer Kaliprosanna Ghosh was appointed the Dewan of Bhawal Estate for Rajendra Narayan. Rajendra died in 1901.

== Area ==
The estate comprised over 1,500 square kilometers, which included 2,274 villages and around 55,000 villagers. Its biggest establishment is the Bhawal Rajbari palace. Temple and shmashana (cremating area) are situated to the south of the palace.

== Popular culture ==
In the early 20th century, a well-known legal case took place involving Ramendra Narayan Roy of the Bhawal zamindar family, which became known as the Bhawal Sannyasi case. The Bengali film Sannyasi Raja, starring actor Uttam Kumar, was based on this historical event and gained significant popularity. Additionally, filmmaker Srijit Mukherji directed Ek Je Chhilo Raja, which depicted the disappearance, return, and subsequent legal proceedings related to the Bhawal Sannyasi case.
