= Tapan K. Datta =

University professor and researcher

Tapan K. Datta is a Wayne State University civil engineering professor and researcher who highly specializes in transportation engineering and safety. After receiving his early schooling, undergraduate degrees, and field experience in Calcutta, India, he moved to the United States to complete his master's and doctoral degrees. While in Detroit, MI, he worked for and later owned Goodell Grivas, Inc., a structural engineering consulting firm, and became a full-time faculty member at Wayne State University in 1973. His most notable contributions include work on the roof of Cobo Hall, in Detroit, MI, and the steel structural work done on Jacobs Field (now Progressive Field) in Cleveland, OH. Dr. Datta has also claimed to be the inventor of the double-drive thru at fast food establishments. Dr. Datta also founded the Transportation Research Group at Wayne State University; this group is composed of undergraduate and graduate students that complete transportation-related research grant projects for the State of Michigan.

== Early life and education ==
Dr. Tapan Datta grew up in India as the youngest child out of four. His father was an electrical and mechanical engineer in India. He earned his diploma from South Calcutta National School in Calcutta, India, in 1955. In 1957, Dr. Datta graduated from Ramakrishna Mission Vivekananda Centenary College, then under the University of Calcutta, with a general two year math and science degree. He cites his reasoning for pursuing civil engineering, and later transportation engineering instead of mechanical or electrical engineering as, “a want to do something different, so that my father could not oversee me all the time”. Dr. Datta also obtained an Urban Planning degree while studying in India, before applying to the Bengal Engineering College, Shibpur (now named as IIEST, Shibpur), also in Calcutta, India. In order to gain admittance to the IIEST Shibpur, he had to compete with 40,000 applicants, of whom only 400 were admitted. Dr. Datta was originally disqualified for being, “too lean and thin...and underweight.” For the next four weeks, he did nothing but eat rice and sleep. Right before his next physical, he drank two gallons of water. He made the weight requirement by one pound, and was then admitted to the college to begin his civil engineering studies.

By 1965, Dr. Datta had earned his B.E. in Civil Engineering and a Graduate Diploma in Town & Regional Planning from Bengal Engineering College. He then moved to Detroit to complete his Masters of Science in Civil Engineering from Wayne State University. He earned his Ph.D. in Civil Engineering with a focus in Transportation from Michigan State University in 1973.

== Employment ==
In 1962, after getting his bachelor's degree in math and science from Vivekananda College, Dr. Datta was employed by Kuljin, an American civil engineering company in India. While working for this company, he was faced with a very competitive work environment which fostered in him the feeling that he could do something though his experiences there. Working for Kuljin was also very important in his academic pursuits; in order to be accepted to the prestigious Bengal University's College of Engineering, experience in the field was required among many other rigorous tests. After a few years of working for Kuljin, Dr. Datta applied to Bengal University and was accepted. After acquiring his degree in Civil Engineering at the Bengal Engineering College of the University of Calcutta, he traveled to Detroit, Michigan, in 1967. While studying for his master's degree at Wayne State University, he worked in the Wayne State mailing room to support himself. He was eventually hired as a part-time professor at Wayne State. Dr. Datta was hired as a full-time faculty member in 1973 by Wayne State.

While at Wayne State, Dr. Datta has worked on many research projects for MDOT, in addition to being a professor of Transportation Engineering. After his first year of employment, he received a grant to run safety training programs throughout the state. Dr. Datta then created the Transportation Research Group (TRG) at Wayne State and has led numerous grant projects through this group. Some projects the TRG completed in recent years include “2005 and 2007 Child Restraint Device Use and Misuse Survey,” the “Susan Harwood Training Grant – OSHA Training Material Development for Highway Construction Work Zones and Traffic Control Hazards,” and a study on the “Identification of Targeted Enforcement Locations for the Reduction of Speed-Related Crashes”.

Around the same time he was hired as a full-time faculty member at Wayne State, Dr. Datta also began working for Goodell Grivas Inc., a structural engineering consulting firm in Southfield, Michigan. This company was responsible for engineering the structural steel of Jacobs Field (now Progressive Field) as it was being constructed in Cleveland, OH, as well as the roof on Cobo Hall in Detroit, Michigan. In 1981, Dr. Datta became the sole owner of Goodell Grivas Inc after one of the existing owners died. Dr. Datta walked away from the company in the early 1990s to fully dedicate his time to research and teaching at Wayne State.

== Achievements ==
In graduate school, Dr. Datta was a member of both Chi Epsilon, the National Civil Engineering Honor Society, and Tau Beta Pi, the National Engineering Honor Society. He earned the 1992 Michigan State Safety Commission Award for long-term contribution in Traffic Engineering and Safety. He received the 2000 “Arthur Carr” Professorship Award from Wayne State University, the Wayne State University Safety Award for Service on the ‘Drive Safety to Wayne State’ Campaign from WSU's Loss Prevention Committee for 2005, and the Engineering Excellence in Teaching Award for 2006 from The Wayne State University College of Engineering. Dr. Datta has earned numerous professional awards such as the Outstanding Individual Engineering Excellence Award in Engineering Education from the Michigan Society of Professional Engineers in 2007, and the Outstanding Contribution to Traffic Safety Award from the Governor's Traffic Safety Advisory Commission in 2007 for the ‘Drive Safely to Wayne State’ Campaign. In 2009, at the annual Traffic Management and Work Zone Safety Conference in Orlando, FL, he was awarded the National Work Zone Safety Awareness Award for the FHWA-sponsored project “Utility Work Zone Traffic Control Guideline Development and Training". That same year, he also received the 2009 Distinguished Alumni Achievement Award, as well as Membership into the Hall of Fame at Wayne State University, College of Engineering. In March 2009, Governor Granholm and the State of Michigan appointed him to the “Construction Safety Standards Commission”.

As of 2019, Dr. Datta has retired from his teaching position at Wayne State University as well as his role in leading the Transportation Research Group.
