= Manoj Majee =

Indian plant biologist

- Born: West Bengal, India
- Education: Burdwan University; Visva-Bharati University; Bose Institute; Jadavpur University; University of Kentucky
- Known for: Studies on plant stress and seed biology
- Awards: 2011 INSA Young Scientist Medal; 2011 NASI Young Scientist Platinum Jubilee Award; 2017/18 N-BIOS Prize
- Scientific career
- Fields: Plant molecular biology; Biochemistry
- Workplaces: National Institute of Plant Genome Research

Manoj Majee is an Indian plant molecular biologist, biochemist, inventor and a senior scientist at the National Institute of Plant Genome Research (NIPGR), New Delhi. He is known for his studies on the molecular and biochemical basis of seed vigor, longevity and seedling establishment.

== Education ==
Majee graduated in Botany with honors from Burdwan University in 1995 and obtained an MSc from Visva-Bharati University in 1998. His doctoral research was at Bose Institute on plant biochemistry and molecular biology which earned him a PhD from Jadavpur University in 2005 after which he did his post doctoral work at the University of Kentucky.

== Work ==
On his return to India, he joined the National Institute of Plant Genome Research as a staff scientist where he holds the position of a Scientist Grade V. Majee holds two patents, and has published a number of articles, (Note: Please see Selected bibliography section) ResearchGate, an online repository of scientific articles has listed 49 of them. The Department of Biotechnology of the Government of India awarded him the National Bioscience Award for Career Development, one of the highest Indian science awards, for his contributions to biosciences, in 2017/18. He is also a recipient of the Young Scientist Medal of the Indian National Science Academy and the Young Scientist Platinum Jubilee Award of the National Academy of Sciences, India, both in 2011.

== Selected bibliography ==
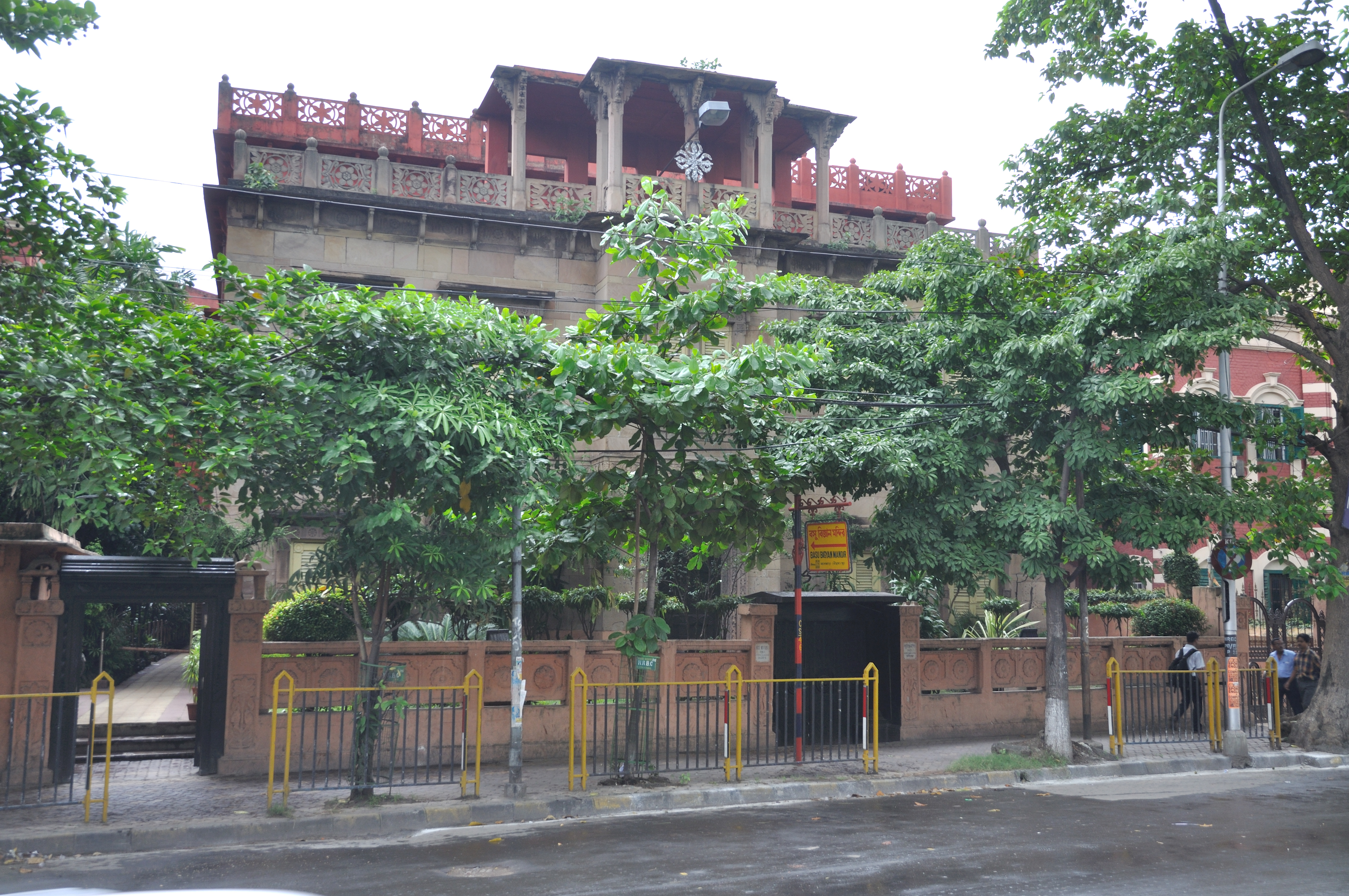
Bose Institute

- Downie, A. Bruce; Huq, Enamul; Vierstra, Richard; Hunt, Arthur G.; Chappell, Joseph; Zhu, Ling; Lloyd, Taylor D.; Dirk, Lynnette M. A.; Goodin, Michael (24 April 2018). "KELCH F-BOX protein positively influences Arabidopsis seed germination by targeting PHYTOCHROME-INTERACTING FACTOR1". Proceedings of the National Academy of Sciences. 115 (17): E4120–E4129. Bibcode:2018PNAS..115E4120M. doi:10.1073/pnas.1711919115. ISSN 1091-6490. PMC 5924874. PMID 29632208.
- Majee, Manoj; Ghosh, Shraboni; Rao, Venkateswara; Verma, Pooja; Kaur, Harmeet; Kamble, Nitin Uttam; Petla, Bhanu Prakash; Saxena, Saurabh Chandra; Salvi, Prafull (11 October 2016). "Differentially expressed galactinol synthase(s) in chickpea are implicated in seed vigor and longevity by limiting the age induced ROS accumulation". Scientific Reports. 6 35088. Bibcode:2016NatSR...635088S. doi:10.1038/srep35088. ISSN 2045-2322. PMC 5057127. PMID 27725707.
- Prakash, Bhanu; Kamble, Nitin; Majee, Manoj (21 September 2015). "Protein L-Isoaspartyl (D-aspartyl) Methyltransferases (PIMTs) are differentially regulated during seed development in Rice and provide seed vigor and longevity". Unpublished. doi:10.13140/rg.2.2.29218.89287.
- Majee, Manoj; Saxena, Saurabh C.; Rao, Venkateswara; Petla, Bhanu Prakash; Kaur, Harmeet; Verma, Pooja (1 March 2013). "PROTEIN l-ISOASPARTYL METHYLTRANSFERASE2 Is Differentially Expressed in Chickpea and Enhances Seed Vigor and Longevity by Reducing Abnormal Isoaspartyl Accumulation Predominantly in Seed Nuclear Proteins". Plant Physiology. 161 (3): 1141–1157. doi:10.1104/pp.112.206243. ISSN 1532-2548. PMC 3585586. PMID 23284083.
- Arora, Sandeep; Majee, Manoj; Dobriyal, Anoop K.; Jain, Sourabh; Saxena, Saurabh C.; Bhatt, Deepesh (1 February 2013). "Cloning, expression and functional validation of drought inducible ascorbate peroxidase (Ec-apx1) from Eleusine coracana". Molecular Biology Reports. 40 (2): 1155–1165. doi:10.1007/s11033-012-2157-z. ISSN 1573-4978. PMID 23065288. S2CID 17281561.

== Patents ==
- "Seed Vigor Associated Polynucleotide Sequences From Chickpea And Uses". 4 January 2012. Inventor: Manoj Majee and Pooja Verma, NIPGR, New Delhi, India
- "A salt tolerant l-myo-inositol 1 phosphate synthase and the process of obtaining the same". Google Patents. 30 December 2018.

== See also ==
- Plant stress measurement
- Polynucleotide
