= Ramakrishna Mission Vivekananda Centenary College =

College in West Bengal

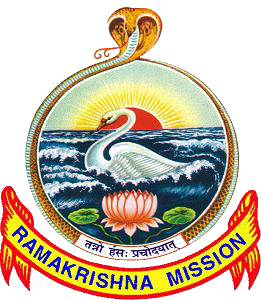
- Emblem
- Type: Undergraduate and Postgraduate
- Established: 1963
- Affiliations: West Bengal State University
- Principal: Swami Kamalasthananda
- Location: Rahara, Khardaha, West Bengal, India; 22.726070°N 88.380531°E
- Campus: Urban
- Controller Of examinations: Swami Vedanuragananda
- Website: rkmvccrahara.org

College rankings

General – India
- NIRF (Colleges) (2024): 3

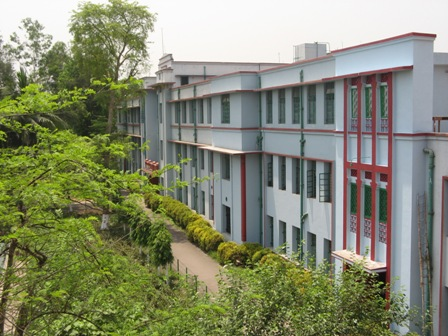
College buildings, April 2010

Ramakrishna Mission Vivekananda Centenary College, popularly known as Rahara V.C. College, is a science college located in Rahara, Kolkata. It is one of the premiere colleges in India. However the college is exclusively for boys. The institute is autonomous and affiliated to the West Bengal State University. It is named after Swami Vivekananda and was inaugurated in 1963, a century after Swamiji's birth. It was formerly affiliated with the Calcutta University. It is administered by the Ramakrishna Mission Order. The college is situated in Rahara, Khardaha, North 24 Parganas district in the state of West Bengal, India. The college is ranked 3rd among colleges in India by the National Institutional Ranking Framework (NIRF) in 2024 and 6th in 2025.

== Courses ==
The college offers undergraduate and postgraduate level courses in Chemistry, Botany, Physics, Mathematics, Zoology, Microbiology and Computer Science leading to the honours and honours with research degree in UG and Masters (M.Sc.) in PG. The college started postgraduate course in Chemistry, Zoology, Botany (2011), mathematics (2018), physics (2022), Computer Science (2025), Microbiology (2025). The college also provides Post graduate PhD. from Department of Botany, Zoology, Chemistry and Computer Science. The college also has status "potential for excellence (CPE)" and it is a DST-FIST sponsored centre. It has been granted autonomous status by UGC, New Delhi.

== Accreditation and affiliation ==
The college is accredited 'A++' grade by the National Assessment and Accreditation Council with a CGPA score of 3.8 and it is affiliated to West Bengal State University. The college has a very good reputation for its discipline and administration. The college has a uniform for UG and PG. The college now enjoys autonomous status by UGC from the session 2017–18.

== Departments ==
- Physics
- Chemistry
- Mathematics
- Botany
- Zoology
- Computer Science
- Microbiology

== Student life and culture ==
=== Festivals ===
Freshers' Welcome, Annual Prize Distribution Ceremony, Blood Donation Camps, Seminars, Eye Operation Camps, Birthday Ceremony of Sri Ramakrishna, Maa Sarada and Swami Vivekananda and many other monastic disciples of Sri Ramakrishna Paramahansa Deva.

Freshers welcomes and many other festivals are featured with students dancing to the melody of kirtans and hymns.

=== Auditorium ===
The college has two auditoriums, R. K. Hall with a capacity of 500 seats; and Vivekananda Hall, fully air-conditioned with a capacity of 200 seats, opened on the golden jubilee celebration of the college, inaugurated by Bratya Basu, Minister for Higher Education, Government of West Bengal. A new community hall named "Sri Ramakrishna Hall", fully air-conditioned with a capacity of 1000 seats, opened on the celebration of 150th birth anniversary of sister Nivedita, inaugurated by Prof. Tathagata Roy, Governor of Tripura on 9 December 2016.

=== Sister Nivedita Multigym ===
On the 150th birth anniversary of sister Nivedita, a multi gym, named after sister Nivedita was inaugurated by Brian McEldulf, Ambassador of Ireland on 9 December 2016.

== Notable alumni ==
- Tapan K. Datta
- Manoj Prasad
- Sankar K. Pal
- Ujjwal Maulik
- Goutam Halder

== See also ==
- List of Ramakrishna Mission institutions
