= Akhilesh Kumar Tyagi =

Indian plant biologist (born 1956)

- Born: 15 May 1956 (age 70); Waira Firozpur, Bulandshahr district, Uttar Pradesh, India
- Education: Government Intermediate College, Meerut; D.A.V.Post Graduate College Dehradun; Institute of Advanced Studies, Meerut; Delhi University; Heinrich Heine University Düsseldorf; LMU Munich
- Known for: Studies on crop improvement
- Awards: 1999 N-BIOS Prize; 2006 NASI Reliance Platinum Jubilee Award; 2006 IBS Birbal Sahni Medal; 2008 ISCA B. P. Pal Memorial Award; 2011 Om Prakash Bhasin Award
- Scientific career
- Fields: Plant genomics
- Workplaces: University of Delhi South Campus; National Institute of Plant Genome Research

Akhilesh Kumar Tyagi (born 15 May 1956) is an Indian plant biologist and formerly, the director of National Institute of Plant Genome Research, senior professor of the University of Delhi and president of the National Academy of Sciences, India. Known for his studies on plant genomics and biotechnology, Tyagi is an elected fellow of all the three major Indian science academies namely Indian Academy of Sciences, Indian National Science Academy and National Academy of Sciences, India as well as The World Academy of Sciences and the National Academy of Agricultural Sciences. The Department of Biotechnology of the Government of India awarded him the National Bioscience Award for Career Development, one of the highest Indian science awards, for his contributions to biosciences in 1999.

== Biography ==
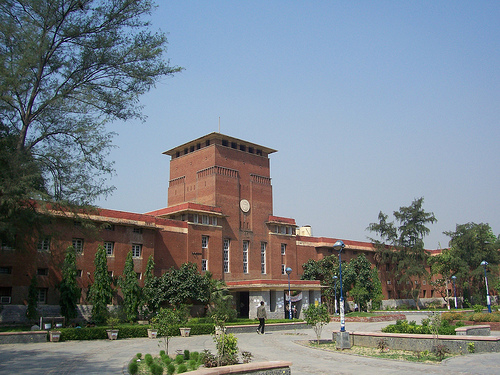
University of Delhi

Akhilesh Kumar Tyagi was born on 15 May 1956 at Waira Ferozepur in Bulandshahr district of the Indian state of Uttar Pradesh and completed his high school at Public Intermediate College, Siyana in 1970 and Intermediate at Government Intermediate College, Meerut in 1972. And, after earning his B.Sc. in 1974 from Meerut college, he continued his studies at D.A.V.Post Graduate College Dehradun to obtain his M.Sc. in 1976. Subsequently, he completed MPhil in 1977 at Institute of Advanced Studies, Meerut and proceeded to Delhi University for his doctoral studies to secure a PhD in 1983 for his thesis on haploid cell culture and genetics. He started his career as a scientist at the Department of Plant Molecular Biology of the University of Delhi at their South Campus and after working there for a year (from 1983 to 1984), he moved to Germany for his post-doctoral work on photosynthesis-related chloroplastic and nuclear genes at two universities there; at Heinrich Heine University Düsseldorf from 1984 to 1985 and at LMU Munich from 1985 to 1986.

Returning to India, Tyagi re-joined the University of Delhi at their South Campus in 1988 as a member of faculty of the Department of Plant Molecular Biology and became a professor in 1994. He was appointed as the head of the department in 1992 and after serving in that position for three years, he became the chair of the Board of Research Studies, Interdisciplinary and Applied Sciences from 1995 to 2003. From 1998 to 2001, he also had the additional responsibility as the head of the Department of Plant Molecular Biology. In 2005, he became the director of the Interdisciplinary Centre for Plant Genomics of Delhi University and after serving ICGP till 2009, he moved to National Institute of Plant Genome Research, an autonomous research institution of the Department of Biotechnology as its director, and held position till 2016. He returned to the University of Delhi in 2016 and was elevated to senior professor in 2018. Following his retirement in 2021, he accepted the NASI M. N. Saha Distinguished Professor position and later, the INSA honorary scientist position in 2025 at the Department of Plant Molecular Biology, University of Delhi.

== Legacy ==
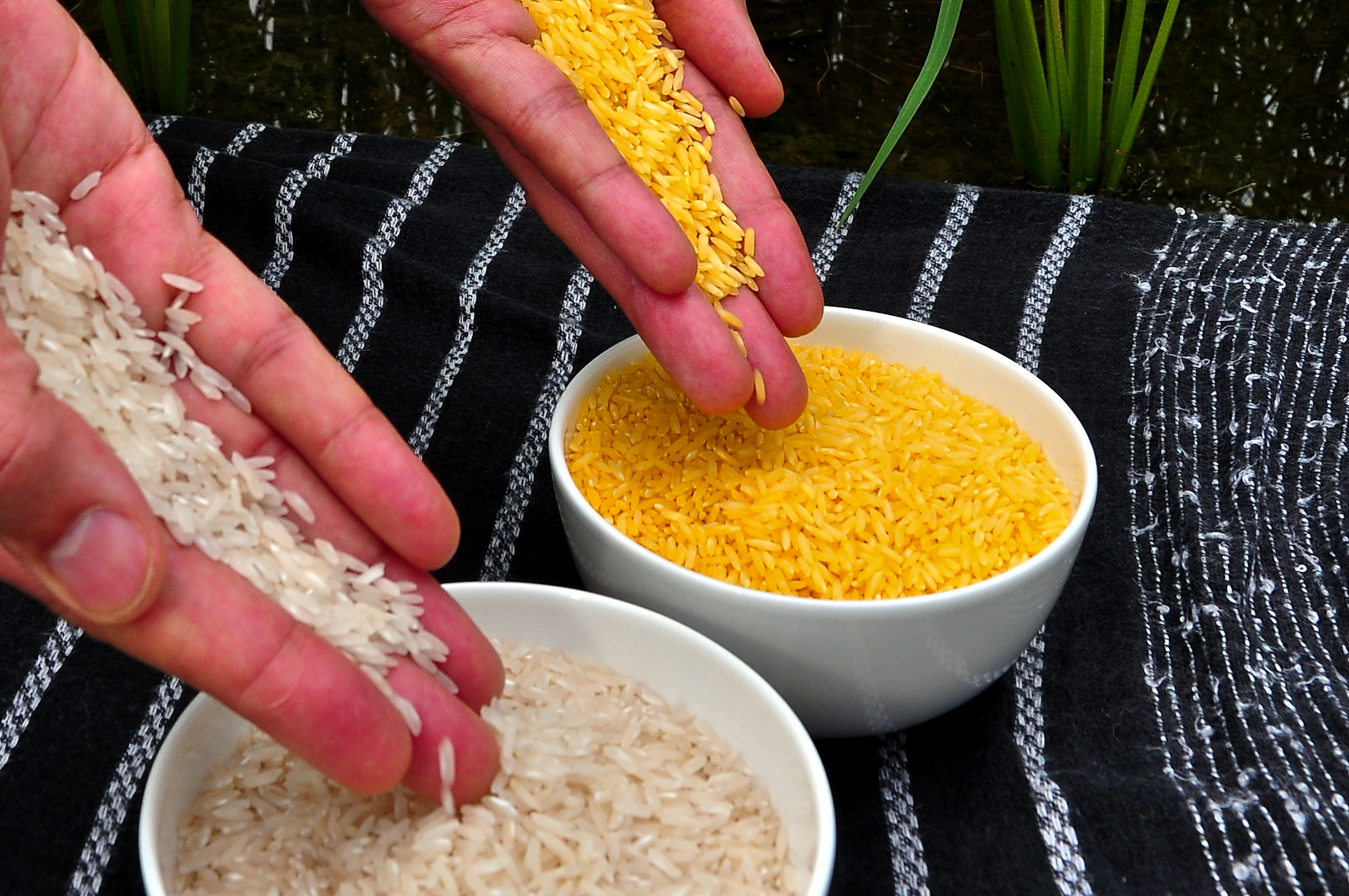
Golden Rice, a genetically modified variety of rice

One of the major contributions of Tyagi has been his efforts towards crop improvement in India using molecular physiology, genomics, and transgenics and his work is reported to have assisted in widening our understanding of neo- and sub-functionalization of regulatory gene families in plants during evolution. He has been among the group of scientists of Delhi University who worked on genome-wide sequencing of rice, tomato and chickpea. He has worked on genes and regulatory elements of rice cultivation, investigated the transcriptome profile of crops and was successful in discovering a new stress-associated protein gene family in plants. His studies have been documented by way of more than 300 articles. He has mentored over 120 post-doctoral, doctoral, master or other research scholars in his career and has delivered more than 350 invited lectures in national and international seminars and conferences. Besides, he sits in the editorial boards of journals such as Transgenic Research, Rice, and Molecular Genetics and Genomics, and is a former editorial board member of International Journal of Plant Genomics and Journal for Plant Biochemistry and Biotechnology.

Tyagi, a former president as well as a former general secretary of the National Academy of Sciences, India, has been involved with several government or semi-government projects related to crop development such as two Indian initiatives on Rice Genome Sequencing and Tomato Genome Sequencing, Network Project on Rice Functional Genomics and Next Generation Challenge Program in Chickpea Genomics. He was the coordinator for the establishment of the Centre for Plant Molecular Biology at South Campus and chaired two task forces namely Task Force on Human Resource Development of the Department of Biotechnology (2003–06) and the Program Advisory Committee for Pant Sciences of the Department of Science and Technology (2007–15). He is the president of the Indian Society for Plant Physiology and has served as the vice-president of the Society for Plant Biochemistry and Biotechnology (1995–2005) and the Indian National Science Academy (2010–11). He is also a former executive director of National Agri-food Biotechnology Institute (2013–16).

== Awards and honors ==
The National Academy of Sciences, India elected him as a fellow in 1998 and the Department of Biotechnology of the Government of India awarded him the National Bioscience Award for Career Development, one of the highest Indian science awards in 1999. The same year, he received the elected fellowship of the Indian National Science Academy. The National academy of Agricultural Sciences elected him as their fellow and he became an elected member of the Plant-Tissue Culture Association of India in 2001. In 2004, he received the elected fellowship of the Indian Academy of Sciences.

The year 2006 brought two awards to Tyagi; the Birbal Sahni Medal of the Indian Botanical Society and the NASI – Reliance Platinum Jubilee Award. The Department of Science and Technology selected him for the J. C. Bose National Fellowship in 2007, the tenure of the fellowship running until 2022. He was chosen for the B. P. Pal Memorial Award of the Indian Science Congress Association in 2008 and for the elected fellowship of The World Academy of Sciences in 2009. He received the Om Prakash Bhasin Award in 2011 and GM Modi award for Science and Technology in 2017. He was felicitated on the 90th foundation day celebration by Indian National Science Academy in 2025 and on Azadi Ka Amrit Mahotsav celebration by the National Academy of Sciences, India in 2023. He was also a part of the International Rice Genome Sequencing Project (IRGSP) team which won the 2003 World Technology Award for Biotechnology (Corporate Division) in 2003 and the International Year of Rice Research Accomplishment Award in 2004.

The award orations delivered by him include SPIC Science Foundation Lecture of Tamil Nadu Agricultural University (1998), Sinha Memorial Lecture of the Indian Botanical Society (2002), Y. Subbarow Memorial Lecture of Guru Gobind Singh Indraprastha University (2005), B. P. Pal Memorial Lecture (2005) and Shri Ranjan Memorial Lecture (2012) of the National Academy of Sciences, India, Platinum Jubilee Lecture (2006) and S. K. Mukherjee Commemoration Lecture (2012) of the Indian Science Congress Association, B. N. Chopra Lecture of the Indian National Science Academy (2007), F. C. Steward Memorial Lecture of the Plant Tissue Culture Association (2010), S. K. Sinha Memorial Lecture of the Indian Society For Plant Physiology (2013), T. N. Khoshoo Memorial Lecture of The Orchid Society of India (2015), A. P. J. Abdul Kalam Lecture of Jiwaji University (2016), S. N. Patnaik Memorial Lecture of Utkal University (2016), SP Ray-Chaudhuri Memorial Lecture of BHU (2018), P. Parija Memorial Lecture of Ravenshaw University, Cuttack (2019), Norkett, Chopra, Gangulee and Udar Memorial Lecture of BK Birla College (Univ of Mumbai) (2019) and MUK-KSK Memorial Lecture of UAS, Bangalore (2025).

== Selected bibliography ==
- Arnab Mukhopadhyay; Shubha Vij; Akhilesh K. Tyagi (2003). "Overexpression of a zinc-finger protein gene from rice confers tolerance to cold, dehydration, and salt stress in transgenic tobacco". Proceedings of the National Academy of Sciences of the United States of America. 101 (16): 6309–6314. doi:10.1073/pnas.0401572101. PMC 395965. PMID 15079051.
- Mukesh Jain; Aashima Nijhawan; Akhilesh K. Tyagi; Jitendra P. Khurana (2006). "Validation of housekeeping genes as internal control for studying gene expression in rice by quantitative real-time PCR". Biochemical and Biophysical Research Communications. 345 (2): 646–651. doi:10.1016/j.bbrc.2006.04.140. PMID 16690022.
- Mukesh Jain; Aashima Nijhawan; Rita Arora; Pinky Agarwal; Swatismita Ray; Pooja Sharma; Sanjay Kapoor; Akhilesh K. Tyagi; Jitendra P. Khurana (2007). "F-Box Proteins in Rice. Genome-Wide Analysis, Classification, Temporal and Spatial Gene Expression during Panicle and Seed Development, and Regulation by Light and Abiotic Stress". Plant Physiology. 143 (4): 1467–1483. doi:10.1104/pp.106.091900. PMC 1851844. PMID 17293439.

== See also ==
- Chloroplast DNA
- Transcriptomics technologies
- Serial analysis of gene expression
- Gene expression
- Functional genomics
