= Pannalal Bose =

Indian Bengali judge

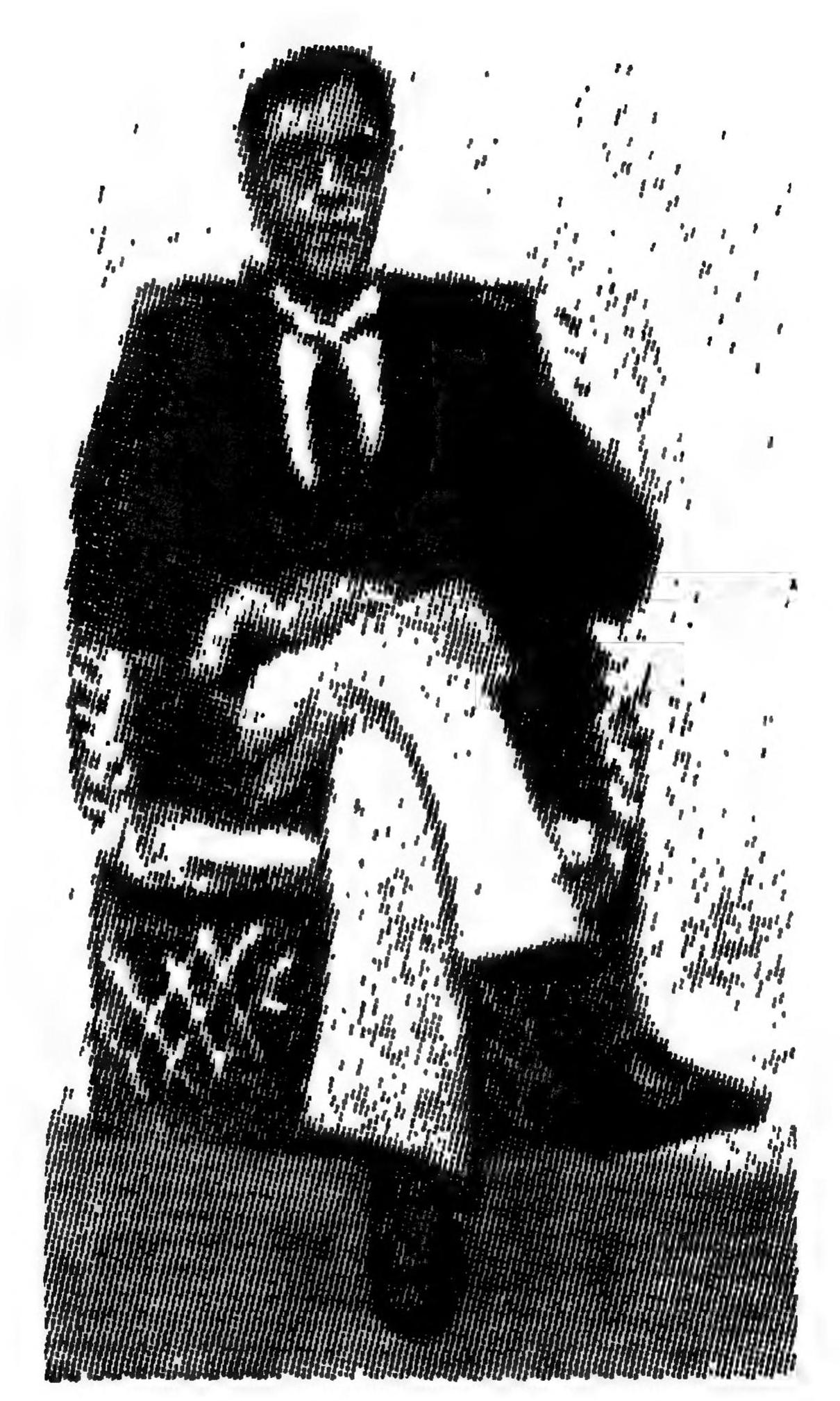
- Born: October 7, 1881
- Died: 29 December 1956 (aged 75)
- Occupations: Judge, Politician
- Known for: Bhawal case

Pannalal Bose (7 October 1881—29 december 1956) was an eminent jurist and an Indian judge who delivered the famous Bhawal's Case which rocked the Privy Council by storm, setting aside a full-bench judgment of the Calcutta High Court. He was the Education and Land Revenue Minister under Government of West Bengal from 1952 to 1956. Bose was educated at the University of Calcutta.

== Legacy ==
Pannalal Institution, a reputed High school situated in Kalyani, Nadia district named after him.
