= Bhawal Raj Shmashaneshwari =

Protected monument in Bangladesh

- ভাওয়াল রাজশ্মশানেশ্বরী (Bengali)
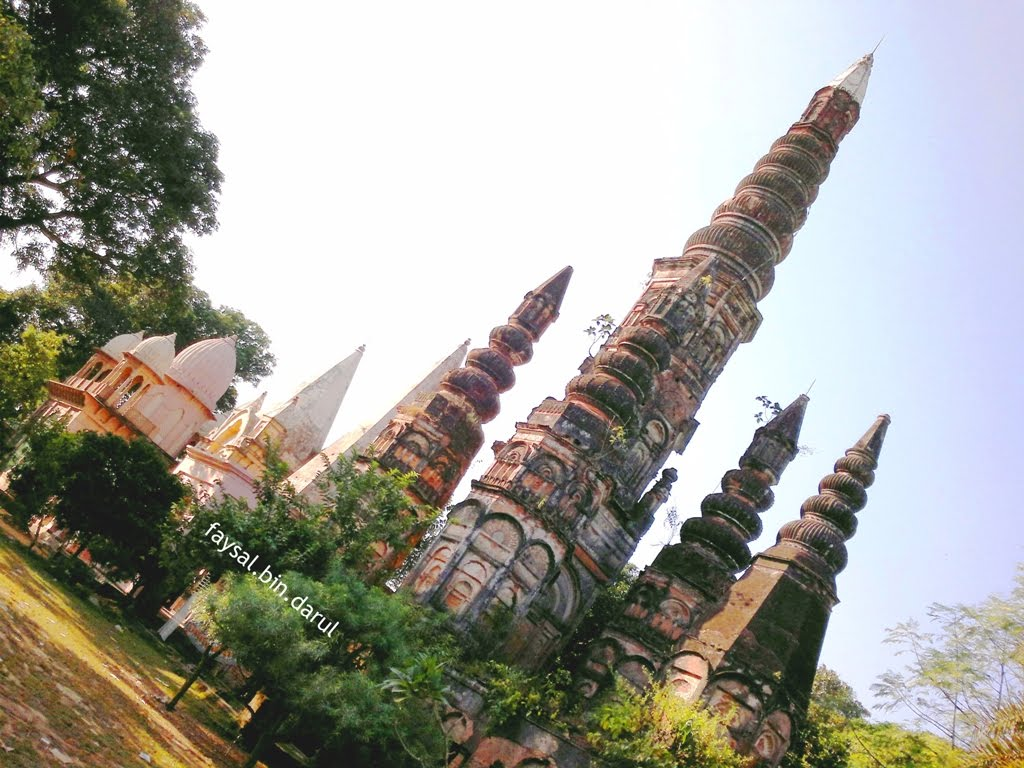
- Interactive map of Bhawal Raj Shmashaneshwari
- 24°00′25″N 90°25′50″E
- Type: Shmashana, Shiva temple
- Location: Joydebpur
- Nearest city: Gazipur
- Part of: Bhawal Estate

History
- Built by: Kamakhya Roy
- Original use: Cremation

Site notes
- Material: Chitagur, lime-powder brick, and burnt clay
- Governing body: Department of Archaeology

Bhawal Raj Shmashaneshwari (Bengali: ভাওয়াল রাজশ্মশানেশ্বরী, lit. 'Royal shmashana of Bhawal Estate') is a protected archaeological site in Bangladesh. The establishment is located at North Chhayabithi area in Joydebpur, Gazipur, about one kilometer north of Bhawal Royal Palace on the southern bank of the Chilai River. It includes seven shmashana grounds, a Shiva temple, and tombs of the deceased. It was the site for the Bhawal royal family's deceased members to be cremated and buried. Due to the temple, the establishment is also known as 'Raj-Rajeshwari Temple.' It is considered a pilgrimage site for Hindus to organize worship of Kali, Saraswati, Basanti, and Shiva.

== History ==
There is no clear mention of the construction period of Shmashaneshwari. According to the Department of Archaeology, construction of the main crematorium was started by King Kirti Narayan Roy; however, during the time of landlord Loknarayan Roy, the grandson of Jaydev Narayan, constructed the complex between the Bengali calender 1250 and 1260. Architect Kamakhya Roy of Puri designed it. According to another account, Kali Narayan Roy inherited the responsibility of the zamindari in 1856. That year, Bhawal palace and Bhawal Raj Shmashaneshwari were constructed.

On April 6, 2017, through a notification in the Bangladesh Gazette, the site was declared a protected archaeological monument.

== Description ==
Shmashaneshwari is an estate complex with the total land area 17-18 bighas, however, the entire complex is situated on only 6 bighas of land. The interior of the main building is divided into four sections. Surrounding the first section is a rotating continuous corridor. There is a small chamber at the back corner of the temple. In addition to plaques and memorials in the names of deceased members of the Bhawal family, the cremation ground features a mausoleum with seven pillars built in Mughal architectural style. Chitagur, lime-powder brick, and burnt clay were among its main construction materials. (Note: Described in the book titled Itihas Oitihye Gazipur (Bengali: ইতিহাস-ঐতিহ্যে গাজীপুর, lit. 'Gazipur in history and tradition') authored by Monir Munna।)

The only Shiva temple is located at the north corner. Next to the mausoleum, on the east side beside the pond, is the cremation monastery. Spread over nearly six acres, seven front-facing monasteries are very plain in architectural style. The remaining four monasteries have a lot of intricate carvings.
