= Debasis Chattopadhyay =

Indian plant molecular biologist

- Born: 20 October 1967 (age 58); West Bengal, India
- Education: University of Calcutta; Cleveland Clinic
- Known for: Studies on abiotic stress tolerance and genome sequencing of plants
- Awards: 2006 ISCA Prof. Umakant Sinha Memorial Award; 2010 N-BIOS Prize; 2017 NASI-Reliance Industries Platinum Jubilee Award
- Scientific career
- Fields: Plant stress biology; Plant Genomics
- Workplaces: National Institute of Plant Genome Research

Debasis Chattopadhyay (born 20 October 1967) is an Indian plant molecular biologist, geneticist and a scientist at the National Institute of Plant Genome Research (NIPGR). Known for his studies in the fields of plant stress biology and genomics, Chattopadhyay is an elected fellow of all the three major Indian science Academies namely the Indian Academy of Sciences, the Indian National Science Academy and the National Academy of Sciences, India. He is also an elected fellow of the West Bengal Academy of Science and Technology.

Chattopadhyay did his doctoral studies at the University of Calcutta and after securing a PhD, moved to the US for his doctoral studies at the Cleveland Clinic. Subsequently, he joined the National Institute of Plant Genome Research, New Delhi where he holds the position of a Grade VII scientist. His research focus is on abiotic stress tolerance and genome sequencing of plants and he holds a US patent for Chimeric construct of mungbean yellow mosaic india virus (MYMIV) and its uses, a process he has co-developed with two of his colleagues at NIPGR. His studies have been documented by way of a number of articles (Note: Please see Selected bibliography section) and ResearchGate, an online repository of scientific articles has listed 83 of them. Besides, he has contributed chapters to books edited by others. He was chosen for the Prof. Umakant Sinha Memorial Award of the Indian Science Congress Association in 2006. The Department of Biotechnology of the Government of India awarded him the National Bioscience Award for Career Development, one of the highest Indian science awards, for his contributions to biosciences, in 2010. He received the NASI-Reliance Industries Platinum Jubilee Award in 2017. He is a recipient of Tata Innovation Fellowship in 2015. He has been awarded with J.C. Bose Fellowship by the Science and Engineering Research Board, Department of Science and Technology, Government of India in 2020.

== Selected bibliography ==
=== Chapters ===
- Girdhar K. Pandey, Manoj Prasad, Amita Pandey, Maik Boehmer (Eds); Mukesh K. Meena, Sanjay Ghawana, Vikas Dwivedi, Ansuman Roy, Debasis Chattopadhyay (Chapter authors) (8 August 2016). "Expression of chickpea CIPK25 enhances root growth and tolerance to dehydration and salt stress in transgenic tobacco". Abiotic Stress Signaling in Plants: Functional Genomic Intervention. Frontiers Media SA. pp. 205–215. ISBN 978-2-88919-891-7.
- Narendra Tuteja, Gill Sarvajeet Singh (Eds); Deepti Jain, Debasis Chaottopadhyay (Chapter authors) (9 December 2012). "Role of DREB-Like Proteins in Improving Stress Tolerance of Transgenic Plants". Plant Acclimation to Environmental Stress. Springer Science & Business Media. pp. 147–161. ISBN 978-1-4614-5001-6.

=== Articles ===
- Khandal, Hitaishi; Parween, Sabiha; Roy, Riti; Meena, Mukesh Kumar; Chattopadhyay, Debasis (5 July 2017). "MicroRNA profiling provides insights into post-transcriptional regulation of gene expression in chickpea root apex under salinity and water deficiency". Scientific Reports. 7 (1): 4632. Bibcode:2017NatSR...7.4632K. doi:10.1038/s41598-017-04906-z. ISSN 2045-2322. PMC 5498500. PMID 28680071.
- Meena, Mukesh Kumar; Ghawana, Sanjay; Dwivedi, Vikas; Roy, Ansuman; Chattopadhyay, Debasis (2015). "Expression of chickpea CIPK25 enhances root growth and tolerance to dehydration and salt stress in transgenic tobacco". Frontiers in Plant Science. 6: 683. doi:10.3389/fpls.2015.00683. ISSN 1664-462X. PMC 4561800. PMID 26442004.
- Jain, Deepti; Chattopadhyay, Debasis (13 February 2013). "Promoter of CaZF, a Chickpea Gene That Positively Regulates Growth and Stress Tolerance, Is Activated by an AP2-Family Transcription Factor CAP2". PLOS ONE. 8 (2) e56737. Bibcode:2013PLoSO...856737J. doi:10.1371/journal.pone.0056737. ISSN 1932-6203. PMC 3572041. PMID 23418595.

== See also ==
- Transgene
- microRNA
