= Bhawal case =

Court case involving a person claiming to be the prince of Bhawal

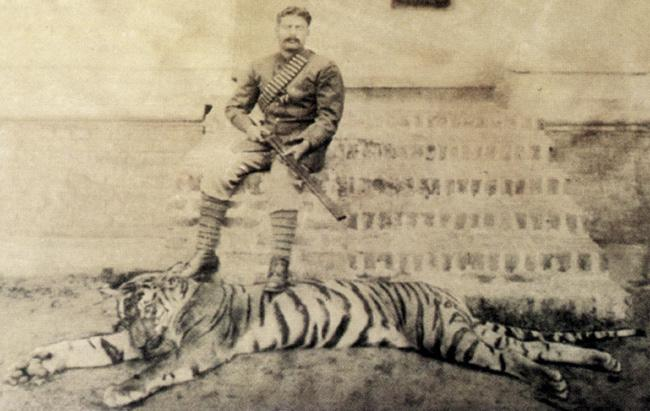
Ramendra Narayan Roy, the prince of Bhawal Estate

The Bhawal case was an extended Indian court case about a person claiming to be the prince of Bhawal, who was presumed dead a decade earlier.

== Apparent first death and cremation ==
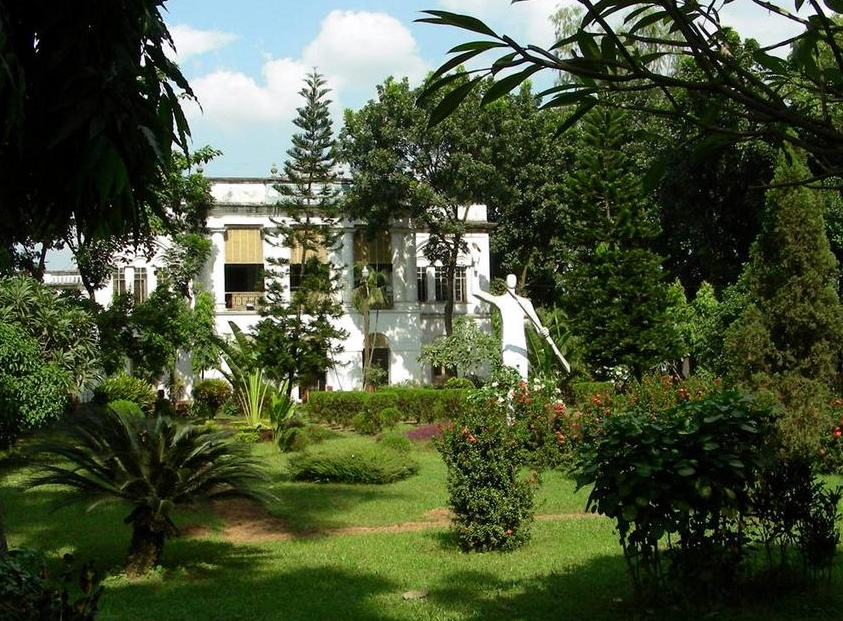
Bhawal estate

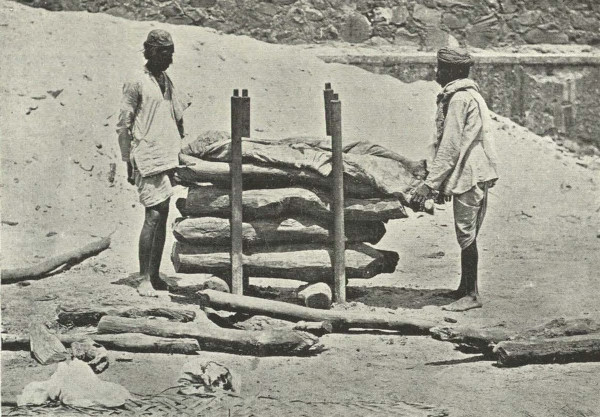
A cremation in the 1900s

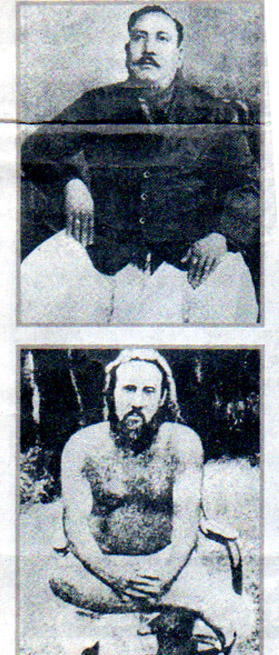
The photograph shows twin photos of Ramendra Narayan Roy, Claimant, and the person who had claimed to be Ramendra Narayan Roy (sanyasi avtar) in the famous Bhawal case. The top photo is of Ramendra Narayan Roy, Claimant, and the bottom photo is of the Claimant as sanyasi.

Ramendra Narayan Roy was a kumar ("princeling") of the Bhawal Estate, a large zamindari in Bengal in modern-day Bangladesh from the family of Shrotriya Brahmins. He was one of three brothers who had inherited the estate from their father. He was popularly known to people as "mejokumar". The Bhawal Estate spread over 579 square miles (1,500 km^{2}) and included villages with a population of around 500,000, many of them tenant farmers. The second son, Ramendra Narayan Roy (b. 28 July 1884), was yet to take up the zamindari management when the famous incident of the Bhawal case took place.

Ramendra Narayan Roy, second kumar of Bhawal, spent most of his time hunting, in festivities, having several mistresses. By 1905 he was said to have contracted syphilis. In 1909 he went to Darjeeling to seek treatment, accompanied by his wife, Bibhabati Devi; her brother Satyendranath Banerjee; and a large retinue, but was reported to have died there on 7 May at the age of 25. The reported cause of death was biliary colic (gallstones). His body was supposedly cremated in Darjeeling the next day and customary funerary rites were performed on 8 May.

Later there was much discussion of exactly what had happened on 8 May, what the exact time of the cremation was, and exactly who had been cremated. Some witnesses testified that a sudden hailstorm had interrupted the cremation just before the pyre should have been lighted and the body might have disappeared when the mourners had sought shelter.

His young wife, Bibhabati Devi, moved to Dhaka to live with her brother Satyen Banerjee. Over the next ten years the other Bhawal princes also died, and the colonial British Court of Wards took control of the estate on behalf of their widows.

Regarding the family name, long before the beginning of the British Raj on the Indian subcontinent, 'Baro Bhuiya' (বারো ভুঁইয়া) (or 12 great landlords) ruled over the Bengal area (including present-day West Bengal, Bangladesh, Assam, Tripura, and parts of modern-day Bihar, Jharkhand and Odisha) and resisted the occupation of Bengal by the Mughals during the 16th and 17th centuries. The Bhawals were descended from one of the Baro Bhuiyan families. It was a fashion among the Zamindari families of those days of acquiring high-sounding titles like Roy and other honourable titles graced by their British heads. Ramendra Narayan Roy's surname of Roy was in fact a title. His original surname was Bhawal.

== Rumors and return ==
In 1920, a sanyasi appeared in Buckland Bund in Dhaka covered in ashes. He sat on the street for four months and attracted attention because he was of unusually good physical stature. There were rumours that he was the returned second kumar, even when the man said that he had renounced his family. Buddhu, the son of an elder sister of the brothers, visited him but was not convinced. Some of the locals arranged for the man's visit to Joydebpur, where he arrived on 12 April 1921 on an elephant. Under public pressure, the sanyasi finally disclosed that he was Ramendra Narayan Roy, the raja of Bhawal.

The sanyasi claimed that while in Darjeeling he was poisoned and a cremation was attempted. But the people hired to cremate the raja left his body unattended and not cremated because a strong hailstorm had started raging at that time. A group of naga sanyasis found him lying unconscious, took him to their abode and nursed him back to health. He recovered but had suffered memory loss and wandered India for the next 10 years. While returning from Chittagong to Dhaka in 1920, he recovered his memory and was instructed by his guru to return home.

Over the following days, his sisters became convinced that this sanyasi was indeed the second kumar, but he returned to Dhaka by 25 April. Relatives invited him back to Joydebpur on 30 April, when various relatives and tenants came to see him. When the crowd questioned him, he remembered the name of his wet nurse, a fact that was not public, and so they recognised him as the second kumar of Bhawal.

== Popular acceptance ==
There was considerable rural acceptance that the man was the second kumar of Bhawal. Many of his former tenants and relatives began to support him. On 15 May a large crowd gathered before the Jaidebpur Rajbari in Dhaka and announced in public that they believed that he was the returned kumar. But the kumar's widow, Bibhabati, refused to meet the claimant and regarded him as an imposter.

On 29 May 1921, the claimant arrived in Dhaka in the Bhawal house with two lawyers to meet the district magistrate and collector, J.H. Lindsay, who recorded his claim.

The British colonial government and the Court of Wards were not enthusiastic. Managers of the Bhawal estate sent investigators to make inquiries about the identity of the claimant and find witnesses to support their side of the story. Two investigators went to Punjab to meet Dharamdas Naga, who identified the claimant as his pupil Mal Singh of Aujla, also known as Sundardas. On 3 June the Board of Revenue announced in public that they had proof that the kumar's body had been cremated in Darjeeling and therefore the claimant was an impostor.

Despite this, the public and many tenants of the Bhawal estate continued to support the claimant. Many tenants paid their rents to the claimant, who used them to hire lawyers. Solicitor Ananda Chandra Nandi agreed to represent him in court. Claimant's principal supporter was Suren Mukherjee.

Both opponents and supporters of the claimant published their own articles and pamphlets propagating their cause. Some of them included alleged eyewitness reports of how a group of sanyasis had rescued the still-alive kumar from the funeral pyre, taken him away and healed him. Others compared the case with that of a historical impostor, Pratap Chand Rai; and even with the Tichborne case. Some writers wrote plays or stories to make their point about the case, some of them accusing Bibhabati and his brother of incestuous relations or conspiracy to poison the kumar.

The Board of Revenue claimed that the whole matter was a conspiracy organised by interested parties who wanted to use the estate for their own purposes. When they had found a suitable candidate, they had prepared him for the part of a returned kumar with the aid of the kumar's sisters. Many Indian witnesses also stated that the claimant could not speak Bengali well, and he was mainly ignorant about the events of the kumar's youth. One of them, Mukunda Guin, was stabbed to death in September 1921.

After the claimant moved to Calcutta in 1924, he also received recognition in local social circles. He joined the Bengal Landholders Association and became a director of Bengal Flotilla Service. He tried to use various official channels to argue his case until 1929, when he moved back to Dhaka and began to collect tenant's rents and tribute against his share of the 1/3 of the property.

== Criminal case: Srimati Bibhabati Devi VS Kumar Ramendra Narayan Roy and others (1936–42) ==
=== First trial ===
On 24 April 1930, lawyers working for the claimant, supported by the sisters and elder sister-in-law of the kumar, filed a declaratory suit in Dhaka claiming the name and property of Ramendra Narayan Roy against Bibhabati Devi and other landholders who were represented by the Court of Wards. Judgement was delivered in favour of the plaintiff in 1936. District judge Alan Henderson assigned judge Pannalal Bose to the case. Bejoy Chandra Chatterjee served as counsel for the claimant, now a plaintiff. Amiya Nath Chaudhuri counselled the defendants, those represented by the Court of wards. The trial began on 30 November 1933.

In court the sanyasi declared that he fell victim to a conspiracy hatched by his brother-in-law Satyendranath Banerjee, an unemployed graduate who wanted to control his share of the estate through his childless sister. He further alleged that Satyendranath had bribed the family physician, Ashutosh Dasgupta, to state that the rajkumar was suffering from syphilis and was persuaded by the conspirators to go for treatment to Darjeeling, where they all lodged at a house called "Step Aside," close to the funeral ground.

Lawyers working for the Court of Wards tried to prove that this barely literate man could not be of Brahmin caste, but those on the claimant's side were able to prove that the kumar had actually been barely able to read and write (today, it is possible that such a condition would have been described as dyslexic). Defense also claimed that the allegation that the kumar had had a mistress named Elokeshi was total fiction. When Elokeshi was summoned, she said that police had offered her money for not testifying.

Defense also argued that the kumar's syphilis had advanced to the state of open sores when there was no sign of any syphilitic scars on the claimant's body. The claimant spoke mainly Urdu, claiming that he had forgotten most of his Bengali during his travels. There was also an argument about the exact colour of the kumar's eyes. There were also claims that the body burned in the funeral pyre had been a substitute.

Both sides summoned hundreds of witnesses and some of their statements were contradictory. Defense questioned the kumar's sister, Jyotirmayi Debi, who supported the claimant, stating that he had various family characteristics and that he did speak Bengali. The plaintiff's side, in turn, closely questioned Bibhabati Devi, who denied she saw any resemblance between her dead husband and the claimant. Ananda Kumari, widow of one of the other kumars, claimed that the kumar had been able to speak English and write in Bengali, neither of which the claimant could do. However, the letters that were presented as evidence of this were found to be forgeries.

In September 1935, the guru Dharamdas Naga arrived to testify in court through an interpreter and repeated that he recognised the claimant as his former disciple Sundardas, previously Mal Singh, who was a Punjabi Sikh from Lahore. The claimant's supporters insisted that this guru was a fraud. Each side took six weeks to present its closing arguments before the court adjourned on 20 May 1936.

Judge Pannalal Basu deliberated his final judgment for three months and on 24 August 1936, after a very detailed explanation and with a large crowd waiting outside, he ruled in favour of the claimant. Afterwards he retired from the judiciary.

=== Appeal ===
The claimant moved to take up residence at the estate, but the Board of Revenue did not release any funds to him. On 5 October 1936, the government filed an appeal against the judgment in the Calcutta High Court, again in the name of the wards of the Court of Wards. Chief justice of the High Court gave an order that all the evidence in the previous trial must be printed for the use of the appellate court. It amounted to 11,327 printed pages.

Three judges, Sir Leonard Costello, Charu Chandra Biswas and Ronald Francis Lodge, formed a special bench for the case. Both sides retained their former lawyers. The hearing began on 14 November 1938.

Appellants' side concentrated on what had really happened in Darjeeling, arguing that there should be proof that the kumar was not dead and of who, if anybody, had been cremated. Respondents' side defended the judgment, stating that the kumar's identity had been proved. Hearings concluded on 14 August 1939.

Judge Costello left for a holiday in Britain, intending to return in November to finish the case. In the meantime, World War II erupted in Europe and he was unable to return owing to the state of war. On 20 August 1940, other judges decided that the judgment could not wait any longer and began to announce their judgment. Other judges had presented their view to Costello in writing; he had delivered his own judgment in writing from Britain, and it remained sealed until it was read in court.

Judge Biswas defended judge Basu's conclusions in his long verdict and stated that the defendants had failed to prove that the Second Kumar had died. He charged that the defendants had tutored witnesses and produced fraudulent letters. He therefore found in favour of the claimant. Justice Lodge disbelieved the story of the rescue, criticised the amount of witnesses both sides had summoned, dismissed many details of the plaintiff's evidence and accused the plaintiff's side of pressuring and insulting the witnesses for the defence. He therefore found in favour of the defendants.

When judge Biswas read the judgment of Justice Costello's on 29 August 1940, it broke the tie. Costello criticised the Court of Wards for pressuring witnesses with irrelevant questions and withholding documents. He did not find sufficient reason to overturn the decision of the lower court. On 25 November, after two months of deliberation, the court announced that Costello's view was valid and therefore the appeal was dismissed.

=== Privy Council ===
The claimant was allowed to withdraw money from his share of the estate. He still left this share in the care of the Court of Wards until further developments. He also got married.

The Board of Revenue did not answer right away and A.N. Chaudhuri withdrew from the case, but Bibhabati Devi was not ready to give up. Developments of the war delayed further appeals until 1943, when lawyers for Bibhabati Devi filed for leave to appeal against the judgment of the High Court in the Privy Council in London. Partially because of the bomb damage to the council chamber in the blitz, the Council moved to the House of Lords and the next hearing began there in 1945. D.N. Pritt worked for the claimant's side, and King's Counsel W.W.K. Page argued the case for the Court of Wards.

Judgement affirming the order of the High Court was delivered on 30 July 1946. A panel of that Court, composed of Lord Thankerton, Sir Madhavan Nair and Lord du Parcq, concluded that the appellants had not demonstrated that the findings of fact as to the claimant's identity were clearly wrong. Finding that no such clearly erroneous finding of fact had been made, the Court declined to reweigh the evidence and the findings made in the courts below and dismissed Bibhabati Devi's appeal.

== Aftermath ==
The same evening, when the claimant went to offer prayers, he suffered a stroke and died two days later. Funeral rites were performed on 13 August 1946. Bibhabati Devi later regarded this as a divinely ordained punishment for imposture. She later refused the inheritance (Rs. 800000) coming from the estate.

== Forensic significance ==
A forensic study conducted on the dead body of the sadhu suggested that he was indeed the kumar:

S.No	Identification data	Kumar Ramendra Narayan Roy (The second Kumar of Bhawal)	The Bhawal Sanyasi
1	Complexion	Pink and white	Pink and white
2	Hair	Brownish	Brownish
3	Hair form	Wavy	Wavy
4	Moustache	Lighter than hair	Lighter than hair
5	Eyes	Brownish	Brownish
6	Lips	Twist on the right lower lip	Twist on the right lower lip
7	Ears	A sharp angle at the rim	A sharp angle at the rim
8	Lobes of ears	Not adherent to the cheeks and pierced	Not adherent to the cheeks and pierced
9	Adam's apple	Prominent	Prominent
10	The left upper first molar tooth	Broken	Broken
11	Hands	Small	Small
12	Index and middle fingers of the left hand	Less unequal than those of the right hand	Less unequal than those of the right hand
13	A point of flesh in the right lower eyelid	Present	Present
14	Feet	Scaly, size 6 for shoes	Scaly, size 6 for shoes
15	Irregular scar on the top outer of the left ankle	Present	Present
16	Syphilis	Present	Present (disputed)
17	Syphilitic ulcers	Present	Present (disputed)
18	Boil mark on the head and back	Present	Present
19	Operation mark near the groin	Present	Present
20	Tiger claw mark on the right arm	Present	Present
21	A minute mole on the dorsum of the penis	Present	Present

== In popular culture ==
=== Film ===
1. Khan Ataur Rahman directed a 1966 Bangladeshi film titled Raja Sonyasi.
1. In the same year, another Bangladeshi director named Raunak Chowdhury released a film on Bhawal king titled Bhawal Sonyasi.
2. Uttam Kumar starred in a Bengali film as the Bhawal Sanyas in Sanyasi Raja directed by Pijush Bose in 1975; it was remade in Telugu in 1977 as Raja Ramesh.
3. Shaheb Chattopadhyay starred in a Bengali TV serial as the Bhawal Sanyas in Sannyasi Raja in TV Channel Star Jalsha in 2017–18
4. Jisshu Sengupta starred in a Bengali film as the Bhawal Sanyas in Ek Je Chhilo Raja directed by Srijit Mukherjee in 2018.

== See also ==
- Tichborne case
- Bhawal Estate
- Zamindars of Bengal
- Baro-Bhuyan
- List of rulers of Bengal
