= Sukhdeep Sangwan =

Indian general

Lieutenant General (Retd.) Sukhdeep Sangwan PVSM AVSM SM*
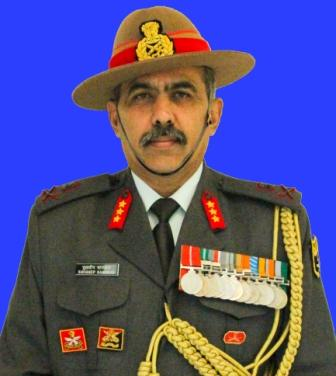
- Lieutenant General Sukhdeep Sangwan
- Military career
- Allegiance: India
- Branch: Indian Army
- Service years: 1982 - May 2021
- Rank: Lieutenant General
- Unit: Rajputana Rifles
- Commands: DGAR
- Awards: Ati Vishisht Seva Medal Sena Medal**

Lieutenant General Sukhdeep Sangwan, PVSM, AVSM, SM Medal Bar is a former General Officer of the Indian Army. He last served as the 20th Director General of the Assam Rifles. He was appointed to the position on 14 May 2018. He supernuated on 31 May 2021. Post retirement the officer has been engaged as a Visiting Professor in some of the IIMs & Prestigious Management Institutions besides being a TedX and Guest Speaker at premier Establishments and Seminars.

== Education ==
He is an alumnus of Officers Training Academy(OTA), Chennai. Sangwan graduated from the Defence Services Staff College in Wellington Cantonment. He also passed the National Defence College in Delhi.

== Career ==
Sangwan was commissioned into the 12th Battalion The Rajputana Rifles in 1982 and has served in various commands and instructional assignments. He has commanded a battalion, a brigade, and a division along the Line of Actual Control on the Northern Frontiers in the High Altitude Area and has also served in the counter-insurgency operations in Punjab, Jammu & Kashmir, Assam, and Nagaland.

Sangwan has experience in leadership, HR, and strategic affairs. He handled the functioning of the Tri-Services Training Institutes, namely National Defence Academy, Defence Services Staff College, Military Institute of Technology, and College of Defence Management over the Training & Doctrine (TRADOC) branch of HQ IDS in New Delhi.

== Awards and decoration ==
Lt. Gen. Sangwan was awarded the Sena Medal in 2012, awarded a bar to the Sena Medal in 2018, and also awarded the Ati Vishisht Seva Medal in 2020.

	Ati Vishisht Seva Medal	Sena Medal**	
Samanya Seva Medal	Special Service Medal		Siachen Glacier Medal
Operation Vijay Medal	Operation Parakram Medal	Sainya Seva Medal	High Altitude Service Medal
50th Anniversary of Independence Medal	30 Years Long Service Medal	20 Years Long Service Medal	9 Years Long Service Medal

== Personal life ==
He wrote a book entitled "Integrated Force Projection by India" and co-authored "Comprehensive National Power."
