= Pannalal Institution =

School in West Bengal

Pannalal Institution is the oldest school of Kalyani township area. It is situated at 11 no. Ward, B Block in Kalyani, Nadia district in the Indian state of West Bengal.

== History ==
The institution was established in 1956 and named after Pannalal Bose, former Education Minister of Government of West Bengal. This is a Boys school with Upper Primary with Secondary and Co-education in the Higher Secondary section having Science, Arts and Commerce streams. The School is affiliated to West Bengal Board of Secondary Education, West Bengal Council of Higher Secondary Education and recognised by School Education Department, West Bengal.

== Notable alumni ==
- Manoj Prasad, Indian scientist
- Indranil Manna, Indian scientist
- Ashique Khudabukhsh, AI researcher at the Rochester Institute of Technology
