= Raja Ramesh =

- Theatrical release poster
- Directed by: V. Madhusudhana Rao
- Written by: Acharya Aatreya (dialogues)
- Screenplay by: V. Madhusudhana Rao
- Based on: Sanyasi Raja by Ashim Kumar Sarkar
- Produced by: M. Seshagiri Rao
- Starring: Akkineni Nageswara Rao; Vanisri
- Cinematography: P. S. Selvaraj
- Edited by: A. Sanjeevi
- Music by: K. V. Mahadevan
- Production company: Suguna Pictures
- Release date: 21 July 1977
- Running time: 135 minutes
- Country: India
- Language: Telugu

Raja Ramesh is a 1977 Indian Telugu-language thriller film directed and co-written by V. Madhusudhana Rao. The film stars Akkineni Nageswara Rao and Vanisri. The music was composed by K. V. Mahadevan. It is a remake of the Bengali film Sanyasi Raja (1975), which was based on the Bhawal case. The film was released on 21 July 1977.

== Cast ==
- Akkineni Nageswara Rao as Raja Ramesh Chandra Bhupathi
- Vanisri as Rani Indumathi Devi
- Jaggayya as Dr. Seshagiri
- Sridhar as Lawyer
- Mikkilineni as Vaikuntham
- P. J. Sarma as Diwanji
- Sarathi as Kaasi
- K. V. Chalam
- Balakrishna
- P. L. Narayana as Thamos
- Kanchana as Padmaja
- Vijaya Lalitha as Vilasini
- Jayamalini as item number
- Halam as item number
- Sasirekha as Ratnabala

== Soundtrack ==
The music was composed by K. V. Mahadevan. Lyrics were written by Acharya Aatreya.

| Song title | Singers | length |
|---|---|---|
| "Entho Rasikudu Devudu" | S. P. Balasubrahmanyam | 2:21 |
| "Nelameedhi Jaabili" | S. P. Balasubrahmanyam, P. Susheela | 3:26 |
| "Nellooru Nerajaana" | S. P. Balasubrahmanyam, P. Susheela | 3:49 |
| "Chandrudu Kanabadaledani" | S. P. Balasubrahmanyam, P. Susheela | 4:04 |
| "Entho Rasikudu Devudu" | P. Susheela | 2:17 |
| "Vayinchu Aadi Talam" | S. P. Balasubrahmanyam | 3:55 |
