= Molecular Biology Reports =

- Discipline: Biology, biochemistry, biophysics, microbiology
- Language: English
- Edited by: Gillian Knight, Inês Alves, Rodrigo Guimarães

Publication details
- History: 1974-present
- Publisher: Springer Science+Business Media
- Frequency: Bimonthly
- Impact factor: 2.316 (2020)

Standard abbreviations
- ISO 4: Mol. Biol. Rep.

Indexing
- ISSN: 0301-4851 (print); 1573-4978 (web)
- OCLC no.: 300185386

Links
- Journal homepage; Online access

Molecular Biology Reports is a monthly peer-reviewed scientific journal covering research on normal and pathological molecular processes.

== Abstracting and indexing ==
The journal is abstracted and indexed in:

- Science Citation Index
- PubMed/MEDLINE
- Scopus
- Embase
- Chemical Abstracts Service
- EBSCO databases
- CAB International
- Academic OneFile
- AGRICOLA
- Aquatic Sciences and Fisheries Abstracts
- Biological Abstracts
- BIOSIS Previews
- Current Contents/Life Sciences
- Elsevier Biobase
- EMBiology
- Global Health
- INIS Atomindex

According to the Journal Citation Reports. The journal has a 2020 impact factor of 2.316.
