= National Institute of Plant Genome Research =

Research Institute in India

Coordinates: 28.5307°N 77.1662°E

- Motto: Sowing seeds for a better tomorrow
- Parent institution: Biotechnology Research and Innovation Council (BRIC)
- Established: 1998; 28 years ago
- Director: Dr. Debasis Chattopadhyay (additional charge)
- Address: Aruna Asaf Ali Marg, New Delhi - 110 067
- Location: New Delhi, India
- Website: https://nipgr.ac.in/

National Institute of Plant Genome Research (NIPGR) is an independent research institute based in New Delhi, India. It specializes in plant genomics and biotechnology and aims to carry out sophisticated research in the fields of plant biology, particularly in comprehending the structure, function, and evolution of plant genomes.

== History ==
The institute was set up in 1998 under the Department of Biotechnology (DBT), Ministry of Science and Technology, Government of India. It was formed to succeed the previous Plant Genome Research Unit at Jawaharlal Nehru University (JNU), New Delhi.

== Research areas ==
NIPGR conducts research across various domains of plant biology, including:

- Structural and functional genomics
- Molecular breeding and crop improvement
- Plant-microbe interactions
- Stress biology and signaling
- Computational biology and bioinformatics

The institute is particularly known for its work in the genomics of important crop plants such as rice, wheat, tomato, mustard, and chickpea.

== Academic programs ==
NIPGR offers doctoral (Ph.D.) programs in association with Jawaharlal Nehru University. Students receive training in cutting-edge research methodologies in plant biology and genomics.

== Collaborations ==
NIPGR has national and international collaborations with various research institutions and universities. It is part of global initiatives in plant genomics and contributes to crop improvement programs through biotechnological innovations.

== Notable people ==
- Asis Datta
- Manju Sharma (biologist)
- Manoj Prasad
- Akhilesh Kumar Tyagi
- Manoj Majee

== See also ==
- Department of Biotechnology (India)
- Indian Council of Agricultural Research
