= Pradeep Chandran Nair =

21st Director General of Assam Rifles

Lieutenant General (Retd.) Pradeep Chandran Nair PVSM, YSM, AVSM
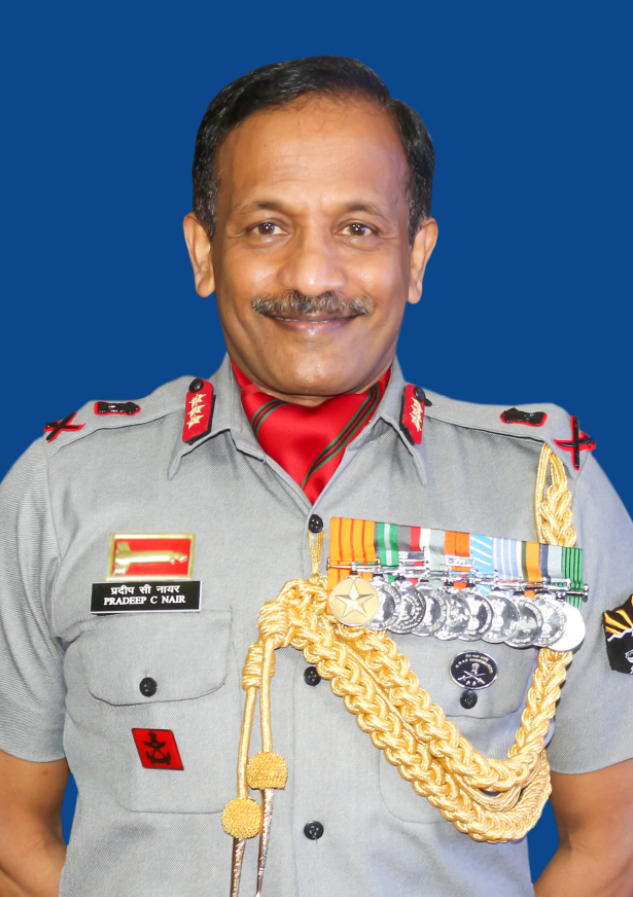
- Alma mater: Sainik School, Satara; National Defence Academy; Indian Military Academy; Defence Services Staff College; College of Defence Management; Indian Institute of Public Administration
- Military career
- Allegiance: India
- Branch: Indian Army
- Service years: 14 December 1985 – 31 July 2024
- Rank: Lieutenant General
- Unit: 18 Sikh Regiment
- Commands: Assam Rifles; 18 Sikh Regiment
- Awards: Param Vishisht Seva Medal; Yudh Seva Medal; Ati Vishisht Seva Medal
- Website: www.assamrifles.gov.in

Lieutenant General Pradeep Chandran Nair PVSM, AVSM, YSM is a retired general officer of the Indian Army. He last served as the 21st Director General of Assam Rifles.

== Military career ==
He did his schooling from St. Joseph's Boys High School, Khadki and Sainik School, Satara and joined National Defence Academy, Khadakwasala in 1982. He was commissioned into 18th Sikh Regiment on 14 Dec 1985, which he later commanded at Faizabad and in Sub Sector Haneef (Siachen Glacier). He has served extensively in the North East in Nagaland, Manipur, Assam and Sikkim. He commanded a Brigade in Manipur, where he was awarded the Yudh Seva Medal and was the Inspector General of Assam Rifles (North) in Nagaland for which he was decorated with the Ati Vishisht Seva Medal. He also has been awarded the Chief of Army Staff Commendation Card on three occasions. He has had instructional appointments at Infantry School Mhow, Headquarters Indian Military Training Team and has been a Directing Staff at Defence Services Staff College, Wellington.

He has served in the Army Headquarters as a Colonel, Major General and Lieutenant General. He has also served as Brigadier General Staff in Maharashtra, Gujarat and Goa Area and in the Defence Intelligence Agency. In his previous assignment at the Army Headquarters, he was the Director General Recruiting, responsible for recruiting officers and men and women in the Indian Army.

== Awards and Decorations ==
Ribbons
Param Vishisht Seva Medal	Ati Vishisht Seva Medal	Yudh Seva Medal	Samanya Seva Medal
Special Service Medal	Siachen Glacier Medal	Sainya Seva Medal	High Altitude Medal
Videsh Seva Medal	50th Independence Anniversary Medal	30 Years Long Service Medal	20 Years Long Service Medal
9 Years Long Service Medal
