= Sanyasi Raja =

Bengali drama film

- Theatrical release poster
- Directed by: Pijush Basu
- Written by: Asim Sarkar
- Screenplay by: Pijush Basu
- Based on: Bhawal Court Case
- Produced by: Asim Sarkar
- Starring: Uttam Kumar; Supriya Devi; Shambhu Bhattacharya; Sulata Chowdhury
- Cinematography: Bijoy Ghosh
- Edited by: Baidyanath Chatterjee
- Music by: Nachiketa Ghosh
- Production company: Usha Films
- Distributed by: Chandimata Films Pvt Ltd
- Release date: 3 October 1975
- Running time: 142 minutes
- Country: India
- Language: Bengali

Sanyasi Raja (transl. The Monk King) is a 1975 Indian Bengali-language period action drama film written and directed by Pijush Basu. Produced by Asim Sarkar under the banner of Usha Films, the film is based on the real-life incident of the Bhawal case. It stars Uttam Kumar in the title role alongside Supriya Devi in a lead role. The film was remade in Telugu in 1977 as Raja Ramesh.

== Plot ==
Zamindar Surya Kishore never looks after his family and estate. Dr Bijoy Chakraborty is a family friend of Surya and lives in the same house. He plans to kill Surya and forces Surya's wife Indu to keep quiet. In a burning ghat, a monk saves the life of Surya, but, back at his home, he finds that his whole property is already occupied by Dr Bijoy. Surya Kishore now plans to recover his lost estate.

== Cast ==
- Uttam Kumar as Surya Kishore
- Supriya Choudhury as Indu
- Satya Bandopadhyay as Thomas
- Rabin Banerjee as Dr. Bijay
- Shambhu Bhattacharya as Nitai
- Sulata Chowdhury
- Tarun Kumar
- Kalyani Adhikari
- Sunil Bandyopadhyay

== Production ==
The film was shot in Jhargram Palace in Jhargram. Uttam Kumar and the whole cast of Sanyasi Raja used to stay in the ground floor of the palace. But according to the rule, the palace authorities do not permit outsiders to enter the second floor. The descendants of the Jhargram Royal Family stay there. It was also shot in Mahisadal Palace and Gohalpota of Jagatballavpur city where Uttam Kumar stay in film businessman Satyanarayan Khan's house.

== Soundtrack ==
Sanyashi Raja

Soundtrack album by Nachiketa Ghosh
- Released: 1975
- Recorded: 1974
- Studio: Usha Films
- Genre: Feature film soundtrack
- Length: 0:28:24
- Label: Angel Digital Pvt Ltd
- Producer: Ashim Sarkar

Nachiketa Ghosh chronology
Nagar Darpane (1975)	Sanyashi Raja (1975)	Hotel Snow Fox (1976)

All lyrics are written by Gauriprasanna Mazumder; all music is composed by Nachiketa Ghosh Songs become popular specially the Kaharba Noy song become blust hit.

Songs
No.	Title	Playback	Length
1.	"Bhalobasar Agun Jwalao"	Manna Dey	3:51
2.	"Thori Bhiksha Karke Lana"	Manna Dey	5:24
3.	"Ghar Sansar Sobai To Chai"	Manna Dey	1:30
4.	"Se Kotha Ki Jane Indu"	Manna Dey	1:05
5.	"Puja Ki Go Theme Jay"	Manna Dey	0:59
6.	"Kato Rasik Dekho Bhagaban"	Manna Dey	1:52
7.	"Karan Sebay Baran Karo"	Manna Dey	1:19
8.	"Hujur Bole Selam Kore"	Manna Dey	1:20
9.	"Ogo Beshi Daam Balo Kar"	Manna Dey	2:09
10.	"Kaharba Noy Dadra Bajao"	Manna Dey	4:01
11.	"Tarana"	Manna Dey	1:44
12.	"Ke Tabo Kanta"	Hemanta Mukherjee	3:10
Total length:			28:24

== Reception ==
Times Of India wrote "This is perhaps one of the most intense Bengali film that have ever been made on real life story. Not only this movie famous for Uttam Kumar's outstanding performance, but it's also a well known Indian court case known as the Bhawal Case." The film was released during Durga Puja and become a major hit and ran for 126 days in theaters. The film become the highest grossing Bengali film in 1975.

== Award ==
Bengal Film Journalists Association Award 1976

- 1976 : Bengal Film Journalists Association Best Lyricist Award - Gauri Prasanna Mazumder

== Remake ==
The film was remade in Telugu as Raja Ramesh in 1977 where ANR starred in the lead role. In 2018 Srijit Mukherji made another film Ek Je Chhilo Raja based on the Bhawal case of which the story line is related to some extent. Jisshu Sengupta played the role of Raja Ramendra Kumar Roy Chowdhury.
