= Plant Cell Reports =

- Discipline: Plant physiology
- Language: English
- Edited by: G. Hahne, M.E. Horn

Publication details
- History: 1981–present
- Publisher: Springer Science+Business Media
- Frequency: Monthly
- Impact factor: 4.57 (2020)

Standard abbreviations
- ISO 4: Plant Cell Rep.

Indexing
- ISSN: 1432-203X
- OCLC no.: 8037527

Links
- Journal homepage

Plant Cell Reports is a monthly peer-reviewed scientific journal. It was established in 1981 and is published by Springer Science+Business Media.
