= Assam Rifles =

Indian border force for the Indo-Burma Border

- Insignia of the Assam Rifles

- Flag of the Assam Rifles
- Abbreviation: AR
- Motto: Friends of the Hill People; Sentinels of the North East उत्तर पूर्व के प्रहरी

Agency overview
- Formed: 1835; 191 years ago (as Cachar Levy); 1883; 143 years ago (as Assam Frontier Police); 1891; 135 years ago (as Assam Military Police); 1917; 109 years ago (as Assam Rifles)
- Employees: 65,143 active personnel
- Annual budget: ₹8,796.68 crore (US$939.7 million) (2026–27)

Jurisdictional structure
- Federal agency: India
- Operations jurisdiction: Northeast India, India
- Northeast India
- Governing body: Ministry of Home Affairs, Ministry of Defence (Operational)
- Constituting instrument: Assam Rifles Act, 2006
- General nature: Federal law enforcement
- Specialist jurisdictions: National border patrol, security, integrity; Paramilitary law enforcement, counter insurgency, riot control

Operational structure
- Headquarters: Shillong, Meghalaya, India
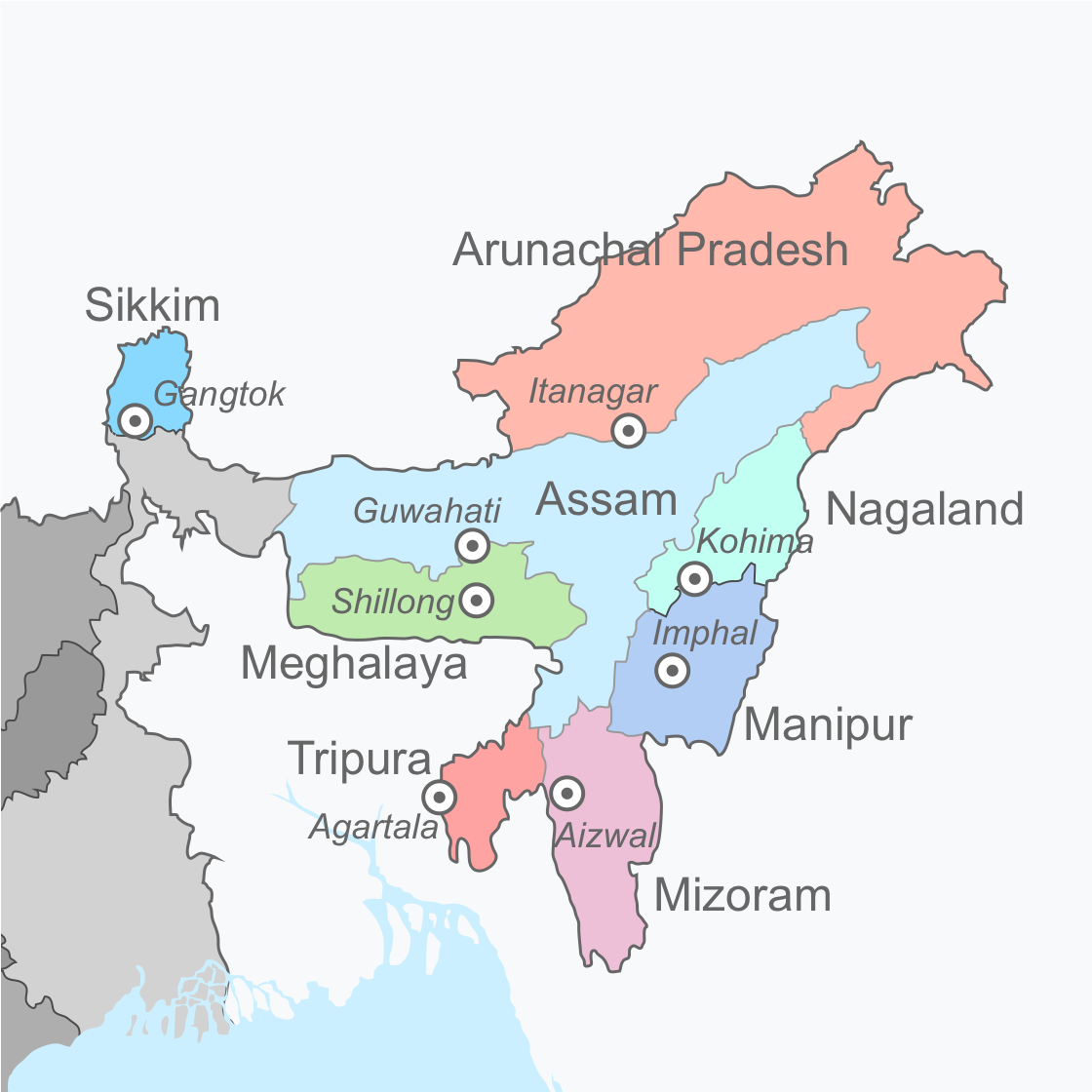
- Ministers responsible: Amit Shah, Minister of Home Affairs; Rajnath Singh, Minister of Defence
- Agency executive: Lt Gen Vikas Lakhera, Director General

Website
- assamrifles.gov.in

The Assam Rifles (AR) is a paramilitary force of India, under administration control of Ministry of Home Affairs, Government of India, and operational control of Indian Army, Ministry of Defence. Its responsible for border security, counter-insurgency, and maintaining law and order in Northeast India and in Jammu & Kashmir in lines of Rashtriya Rifles. Its primary duty involves guarding the Indo-Myanmar border. The AR is one of the Oldest Central Para-military Force of India, formed in 1835. As a central paramilitary force, its recruitment, perks, promotions, and retirement policies are governed by Assam Rifles Regulations. Approximately 80 percent of the officers are deputed from the Indian Army, while the remaining are drawn from the Assam Rifles cadre. The AR is commanded by the Director General of the Assam Rifles (DG AR), appointed by the Ministry of Home Affairs, Government of India.

The AR is often nicknamed "Sentinels of the North East" and "Friends of the Hill People". It is the oldest paramilitary force in India, originally raised in 1835 as Cachar Levy, a militia to protect tea gardens and the fertile plains of Assam against unruly tribes. Its scope increased with the expansion of British Raj in Northeast India, and it was used against insurgencies in the region. The force was redesignated as Assam Frontier Police in 1883, Assam Military Police in 1891, and East Bengal and Assam Military Police in 1913. It got its present name in 1917. After independence, the AR functioned under the Ministry of External Affairs. Its operational control was transferred to the Indian Army after the Sino-Indian War of 1962. It came under the administration of Ministry of Home Affairs in 1965, with the Army retaining operational control.

Throughout its history, the Assam Rifles have served in various conflicts and theaters, including World War I by serving in Europe and the Middle East, and World War II, where they served mainly in Burma. After the Chinese annexation of Tibet, the AR were tasked with manning Assam's section of the Tibetan border. They were also instrumental in maintaining law and order in Arunachal Pradesh.

As of the 2019–2020 report of the Ministry of Home Affairs, there are 46 battalions in the Assam Rifles with a sanctioned strength of 65,143 personnel. They perform many roles including upholding internal security under the control of the army through the conduct of counterinsurgency and border security operations, provision of aid to civilians in times of emergency, and the facilitation of communications, medical assistance and education in remote areas. In times of war they can also be used as a combat force to secure rear areas if needed. Since 2002, the force has had the role of guarding the India–Myanmar border.

== History ==
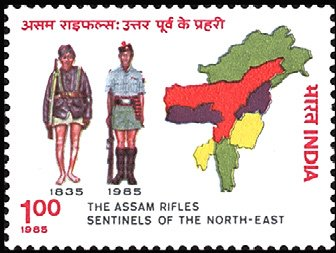
1985 postage stamp

=== Early history ===
The present day Assam Rifles can trace its origins to a paramilitary force known as Cachar Levy which was established by the British in 1835 in the Assam region. The Assam Rifles boasts of being the oldest paramilitary force. With approximately seven hundred and fifty men, this force was formed as a police unit to protect settlements against tribal raids and other assaults as British rule slowly moved towards the north east parts of India.

Despite problems with equipment and training, the contribution of this force in opening the region to administration and commerce was nevertheless quite significant and over time they have become known as the "right arm of the civil and [the] left arm of the military" in the region. In 1870 these existing elements were merged into three Assam Military Police battalions which were spread out in the Lushai Hills (later 1st battalion), Lakhimpur (2nd battalion) and Naga Hills (3rd battalion). A fourth battalion was later formed Imphal in 1915. Following India's independence, Col. Sidhiman Rai, MC, was appointed the first Indian DG of Assam Rifles.

Since then the name of the force has undergone a number of changes, as have the roles that it has been required to perform.

=== World War I and Interwar years ===
During World War I, men from what was then known as the Assam Military Police were part of the Indian forces that fought in Europe and the Middle East. Over three thousand men from the force were provided to the Gorkha regiments of the Indian Army in this time, earning seventy-six gallantry awards during the conflict including seven Indian Order of Merit awards and five Indian Distinguished Service Medals. These men performed with such distinction that the name Assam Rifles was assigned in 1917 as recognition of their part in the war. Elements of the force were also utilised in India during the war, being used to maintain internal security in order to free up troops from the army for use overseas. During this time, the most notable action occurred in 1917 when columns of the Assam Rifles were despatched to Patna, to restore law and order in the riot-torn city.

After the war the force returned to northern India where they were used to maintain security amidst growing civil unrest and disorder. In concert with the British Indian Army, they also undertook a number of expeditions into remote tribal areas along the north-east frontier and into Burma. In 1924 they were sent to Malabar, which was then still part of the Madras Presidency, to carry out operations against the Mopla rebels.

=== World War II ===
During World War II, the role of the Assam Rifles evolved once more as they were called upon to undertake even more varied tasks due to their status as both a police and military organisation. This time, however, their service would be undertaken closer to home. After the lightning Japanese advance in 1942, the Assam Rifles fought a number of Independent actions behind enemy lines as the task of rear-area defence and rear-guard often fell to them during the Allies retreat into India. Later, as a large influx of refugees fled from the advancing Japanese into India, the Assam Rifles were given the task of managing and organising this mass of humanity.

They also organized a resistance group on the Indo–Burmese border to counter the Japanese invasion and to harass the enemy line of communications. This group became known as "Victor Force" (or sometimes V-Force), and the nucleus of it was formed from platoons made up of men from the Assam Rifles. As part of this force, Assam Rifles platoons were used as covering forces during the latter stages of the Burma Campaign. Other elements fought in the defensive "boxes" around Kohima, whilst another, from the 4th Battalion, trained as airborne troops, was dropped near the Sittang River behind Japanese lines. The 1st Battalion, as part of Lushai Brigade was sent ahead of the rest of the force to provide resistance in the Chin Hills. As a testament to the performance of Assam Rifles men during the war, members of the unit received forty-eight gallantry awards. These included: three MBE's, five Military Crosses, 4 Orders of British India, one Indian Order of Merit, 13 Military Medals, 15 Indian Distinguished Service Medals and 7 British Empire Medals.

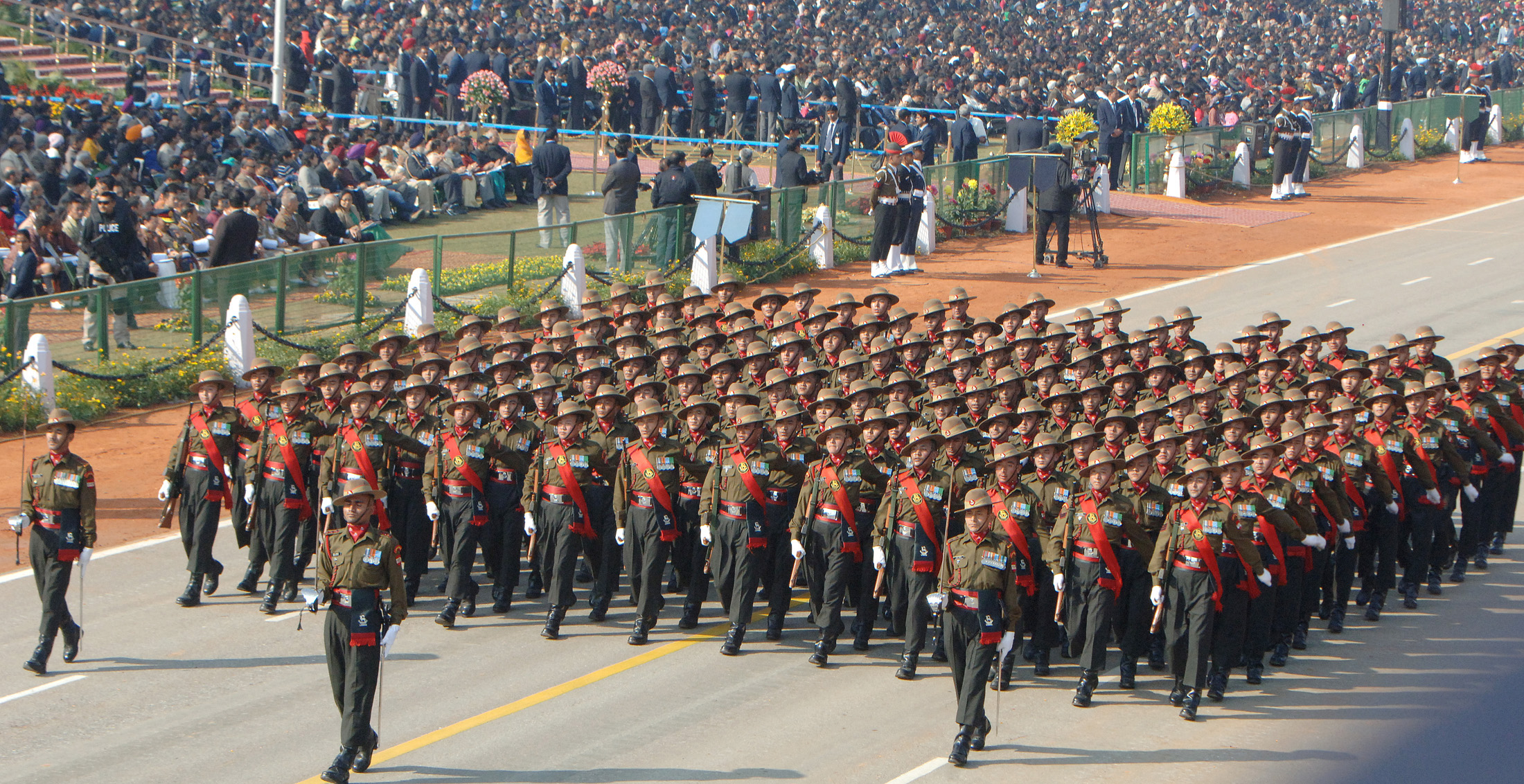
Assam Rifles personnel during the 64th Republic Day Parade, 2013

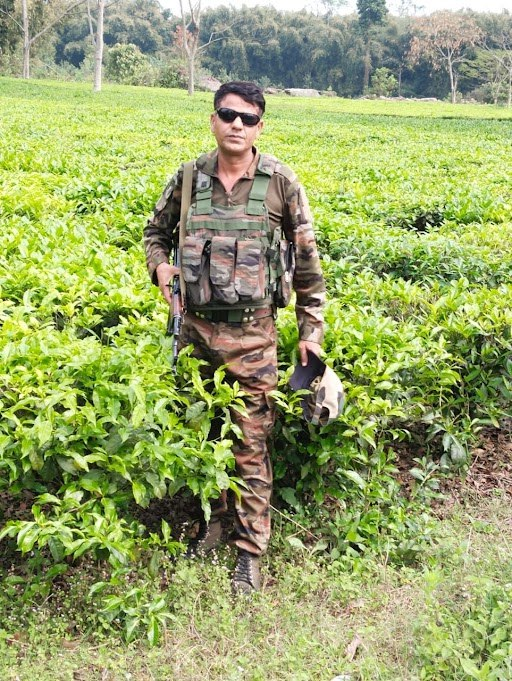
An Assam Rifles soldier on regular patrol

=== Postwar period ===
Following the end of the war the five Assam Rifles battalions became part of the civil police under the Assam Inspector General of Police. After independence, however, the Indian government assigned the Assam Rifles its own Director General, who is sent on tenure-based postings from the Indian Army. As the numbers of the force and the number of battalions gradually increased, the rank of the force commander was upgraded to Director General, which is occupied by a lieutenant general ranking officer in the Indian Army. The present Director General of the Assam Rifles is Vikas Lakhera.

Prior to 1965, this force was under the Ministry of External Affairs, who were looking after NEFA affairs. Later, it was transferred to the Ministry of Home Affairs, with Indian Army retaining operational control. From a nominal complement of only five battalions in 1947, it has grown to 46 with several range HQs. 3 training center, and a number of logistics units function under the HQ DGAR, Shillong. The Assam Rifles Public School is a much sought after education institute in the North East.

The role of the Assam Rifles continued to evolve when in 1950 a devastating earthquake hit the Assam region and the force was called in to assist in the reconstruction of the areas and help in the resettlement and rehabilitation of those affected by it. Later the force was once again called to undertake a combat role when, during the 1962 Sino-Indian War elements were used to delay the advancing Chinese forces so that the Indian Army could establish its defence lines. During this time and since then, the Assam Rifles also maintained their peacekeeping role in the northern areas of India in the face of growing tribal unrest and insurgency. In this environment the maintenance of law and order, countering insurgency and reassuring the people of the region became important tasks for the security forces and initially they fell to the Assam Rifles before the Army assumed control, and then later their experience and goodwill in the region was drawn upon in order to assist the army in conducting these tasks. In recognition of the unit's skill in counterinsurgency operations, three battalions were deployed on Operation Pawan in Sri Lanka between December 1988 and February 1990.

Through its deployment in what has become known as the "tribal belt", the Assam Rifles have developed an ethos that is based primarily upon the notion of extending the hand of friendship with the people of the region despite the troubles that have occurred there. This has resulted in their employment in a number of developmental activities in the region as they have worked to bring order and security to it. As such, their role has been further expanded to include the provision of medical assistance and basic education, assisting in reconstruction and agriculture and handling communications in remote areas.

From a force of 5 battalions in 1947, the Assam Rifles has grown substantially over the years. In 1960 there were 17 battalions, in 1968 there were 21 and today there are 46 battalions. In addition, the force has several area HQs, a training centre that processes up to 1,800 recruits at time, and a number of logistics units.

== Organization ==
The Assam Rifles consists of a Director General Headquarter in Shillong, 3 Inspectorate General Headquarters, 12 Sector Headquarters, 46 Battalions, one Training Centre and administrative elements with a total authorized strength of 65,143 personnel.

=== Organization structure ===
HQ DGAR
The Assam Rifles is commanded by an officer of the rank of Lieutenant General from the Indian Army, who is known as the Director General of the Assam Rifles (DG AR). The DG AR has their office at the HQ Directorate General of Assam Rifle at Shillong, unlike other Central Armed Police Forces which are located at Delhi.

HQ IGAR
HQ Inspector General Assam Rifles comes next in chain of command after HQ MGAR. It is commanded by an officer of the rank of Major General from the Indian Army and exercises command and control over the sector HQs.

Sector HQ
The Sector HQ are commanded by Army Officers of the rank of Brigadier from the Army. The Sector HQ exercises direct command and control over the Assam Rifles Battalions deployed in its area of responsibility.

Maintenance Group Assam Rifles (MGAR)
The Maintenance Groups located at various location provide the requisite administrative support to the Assam Rifles formations and battalions deployed in the field. The MGAR are commanded by officers of the rank of Lieutenant Colonel from the Army.

Workshop
The workshop are co-located with the MGAR to provide repair and recovery cover to the field formations. These workshops further provide detachments to the Sector HQs to provide repair and recovery cover as far forward as possible to the battalions.

=== Areas covered ===
The areas covered by the Assam Rifles are themselves divided into sectors:

- Assam Rifles North – Kohima, Nagaland
  - Sector 5 – Poonch, Jammu And Kashmir
  - Sector 6 – Dimapur, Nagaland
  - Sector 7 – Tuensang, Nagaland
  - Sector 25 – Lekhapani, Assam
- Assam Rifles South – Imphal, Manipur
  - Sector 9 – Imphal, Manipur
  - Sector 10 – Ukhrul South, Manipur
  - Sector 26 – Thoubal, Manipur
  - Sector 27 – Churchandrapur, Manipur
  - Sector 28 – Kakching, Manipur
- Assam Rifles East – Silchar, Assam
  - Sector 21 – Agartala, Tripura
  - Sector 22 – Haflong, Assam
  - Sector 23 – Aizawl, Mizoram
- Assam Rifles Training Centre & School – Dimapur, Nagaland

=== Battalions ===
- 1 Manipur (1 Assam Rifles) IGAR North
- 2 J&K (2 Assam Rifles) (Second to none), Mizoram
- 3 Lunglei Battalion (3 Assam Rifles) IGAR East: Tuipang, Mizoram
- 4 Mantripukhri Battalion (4 Assam Rifles)
- 5 Dimapur Battalion (5 Assam Rifles)
- 6 Khonsa Battalion (6 Assam Rifles) IGAR North
- 7 Kishtwar Battalion(7 Assam Rifles)jammu and Kashmir
- 8 Chassad Battalion (8 Assam Rifles):
- 9 Jaluki Nagaland (9 Assam Rifles)
- 10 Noney Battalion (10 Assam Rifles)
- 11 Haflong Battalion (11 Assam Rifles) (Double First) IGAR East
- 12 Joypur Battalion (12 Assam Rifles)
- 13 Kohima (13 Assam Rifles) IGAR South
- 14 Samatur Nagaland (14 Assam Rifles)
- 15 Sajik Tampak Battalion (15 Assam Rifles) IGAR South
- 16 Keithelmanbi Battalions (16 Assam Rifles) IGAR South: Imphal East District, Manipur.
- 17 Lokra Battalion (17 Assam Rifles)
- 18 Agartala Battalion (18 Assam Rifles)
- 19 Jairampur Battalion (19 Assam Rifles) (Magnificent Nineteen)IGAR North
- 20 Tengnoupal Battalion (20 Assam Rifles) IGAR South
- 21 Modi Battalion (21 Assam Rifles)
- 22 Ghaspani Battalion (22 Assam Rifles) (Bais Bahadur) Nagaland
- 23 Mokokchung Battalion (23 Assam Rifles) IGAR North
- 24 Longding Battalion (24 Assam Rifles)
- 25 Thalela J&K (25 Assam Rifles)
- 26 Paribal Tekri Battalion (26 Assam Rifles) (Ujjawal Chhabbees), Jammu & Kashmir
- 27 Thoubal Battalion (27 Assam Rifles) (Magnificiant Hornbills)
- 28 Shoor Veer Battalion (28 Assam Rifles) IGAR North
- 29 Uttam Untees Battalion (29 Assam Rifles)
- 30 Joupi Battalion (30 Assam Rifles)
- 31 Loktak Battalion (31 Assam Rifles) IGAR South
- 32 Zunheboto Battalion (32 Assam Rifles) (Tenacious Thirtytwo)
- 33 Maram Battalion (33 Assam Rifles); Chandel District, Manipur
- 34 Wusan Battalion (34 Assam Rifles), Jammu & Kashmir
- 35 Somsai Battalion (35 Assam Rifles)
- 36 Jalukie Battalion (36 Assam Rifles) IGAR North
- 37 Phundrei Battalion (37 Assam Rifles) IGAR South
- 38 Shukhuvi Battalion (38 Assam Rifles)
- 39 Srikona Battalion (39 Assam Rifles B & D Coy)
- 40 Shangshak Battalion (40 Assam Rifles) IGAR South
- 41 Kiphire Battalion (41 Assam Rifles): Kiphire Dist, Nagalan
- 42 Serchhip Battalions (42 Assam Rifles) Mizoram
- 43 Moreh Battalion (43 Assam Rifles) IGAR South
- 44 Tamenglong Battalion (44 Assam Rifles) IGAR East
- 45 Chiswama Kohima(45 Assam Rifles)
- 46 Khuga Battalion (46 Assam Rifles)

NDRF Battalion

- 13 Bn NDRF, Samba, Jammu & Kashmir

== Decorations ==
Members of the Assam Rifles have received the following military decorations -

Pre – Independence Awards

Award	Times awarded
Commander Of The Order Of British Empire (CBE)	1
Member Of The Order Of British Empire (MBE)	3
Companion of Order of the Indian Empire (CIE)	2
Indian Order Of Merit (IOM)	13
King's Police Medal (KPM)	11
Military Cross (MC)	5
Order Of British India (OBI)	6
Indian Distinguished Service Medal (IDSM)	31
Military Medal (MM)	25
British Empire Medal (BEM)	7
Mentioned In Dispatches	4

Post – Independence Awards

Award	Times awarded
Ashoka Chakra	4
Param Vishisht Seva Medal	10
Kirti Chakra	33
Uttam Yudh Seva Medal	1
Ati Vishisht Seva Medal	23
Vir Chakra	5
Shaurya Chakra	147
Yudh Seva Medal	12
Sena Medal	400
Vishisht Seva Medal	97
Mentioned in dispatches	39

== Director General of Assam Rifles ==
The Director General Assam Rifles (DG AR) is the head of the Assam Rifles. The DG AR maintains an office in the Headquarters DG AR at Shillong. Appointed by the Government of India, the DG AR reports to the Minister of Home Affairs. The holder of this rank is a Lieutenant General of the Indian Army. The position is currently held by Lt Gen Vikas Lakhera.

== Rank structure ==
Officers

Rank group	General / flag officers			Senior officers			Junior officers
Assam Rifles	Director-general (Note: Equivalent to the rank lieutenant general (लेफ्टिनेंट - जनरल)) - / Special director-general (Note: Equivalent to the rank lieutenant general (लेफ्टिनेंट - जनरल)) - / Additional director-general (Note: Equivalent to the rank lieutenant general (लेफ्टिनेंट - जनरल)) -
Assam Rifles	Director-general - / Special director-general - / Additional director-general -	Inspector general (Note: Equivalent to the rank major general (मेजर - जनरल)) -	Deputy inspector-general (Note: Equivalent to the rank brigadier (ब्रिगेडियर)) -	Commandant (Note: Equivalent to the rank colonel (कर्नल)) -	Second-in-command (Note: Equivalent to the rank lieutenant colonel (लेफ्टिनेंट - कर्नल)) -	Deputy commandant (Note: Equivalent to the rank major (मेजर)) -	Assistant commandant (Note: Equivalent to the rank captain (कप्तान)) -

Enlisted ranks

Rank group	Subordinate Officers (SO)			Non commissioned officers (NCO)		Enlisted
Assam Rifles						No insignia
Assam Rifles	Subedar major सूबेदार मेजर	Subedar सूबेदार	Naib subedar नायब सूबेदार	Warrant officer -	Havildar (Note: Equivalent to the rank head constable (-)) हवलदार	Rifleman (Note: Equivalent to the rank constable (-)) -

=== Historic rank structure ===
Enlisted ranks

Rank group	Subordinate Officers (SO)			Non commissioned officers (NCO)			Enlisted
Assam Rifles –2018							No insignia
Assam Rifles –2018	Subedar Major सूबेदार मेजर	Subedar सूबेदार	Naib Subedar नायब सूबेदार	Havildar हवलदार	Naik नायक	Lance Naik लांस नायक	Sepoy सिपाही

== See also ==
- Assam Regiment
- Border Security Force
- Central Industrial Security Force
- Central Reserve Police Force
  - Rapid Action Force
- Indian Army
- Indo-Tibetan Border Police
- Ministry of Home Affairs (India)
- Ministry of Defence (India)
- National Security Guard
- Paramilitary forces of India
- Rashtriya Rifles
- Sashastra Seema Bal
- Special Forces of India
- Assam Rifles football club

== Bibliography ==
- Parker, John (2005). The Gurkhas: The Inside Story of the World's Most Feared Soldiers. Headline Book Publishing. ISBN 978-0-7553-1415-7.
- "History of the Assam Rifles". Retrieved 25 February 2009.
- "Assam Rifles Training Centre". Retrieved 25 February 2009.
- Shakespear, Leslie. (1929). History of the Assam Rifles. Macmillan: London. Reprinted in 1977 by Firma.
- Sharma, A.K. (2008). "The Assam Rifles: Sentinels of the East". Archived from the original on 19 May 2008.
