= Paramilitary forces of India =

Auxiliary Forces of India

Paramilitary Forces of India refer to a group of 10 armed organisations responsible for supporting the Indian military and ensuring internal security.

== List of paramilitary forces ==
From 1986 to 2011 the Central Armed Police Forces (CAPF) were considered as Central Police Organisations (CPOs). However, as per their respective acts they all are Armed Police Forces.

The paramilitary forces are made up of:

- Central Armed Police Forces
  - Border Guarding Forces
    - Assam Rifles (AR)
    - Border Security Force (BSF)
    - Indo-Tibetan Border Police (ITBP)
    - Sashastra Seema Bal (SSB)
  - Special Task Force
    - National Security Guard (NSG)
  - Forces for Internal Security
    - Central Industrial Security Force (CISF)
    - Central Reserve Police Force (CRPF)
- Railway Protection Force (RPF)
- Special Frontier Force (SFF)
- Special Protection Group (SPG)

Paramilitary Forces
Paramilitary force	Active Strength	Governing Body	Operational area	Role
Assam Rifles	63,747	Ministry of Home Affairs (administrative); Ministry of Defence (operational)	Northeast India, India–Myanmar border	Border guard
Border Security Force	257,363	Ministry of Home Affairs	India–Pakistan border and India–Bangladesh border	Border guard
Central Industrial Security Force	144,418	Ministry of Home Affairs	Industries, public sector undertakings, space installations, airports, seaports and Delhi Metro	Protection and security of operational areas
Central Reserve Police Force	312,707 (July 2026)	Ministry of Home Affairs	All India Force	Counter-insurgency and general elections
Indo-Tibetan Border Police	89,432	Ministry of Home Affairs	India–China border	Border guard
National Security Guard	10,000	Ministry of Home Affairs	Active Special operations in India	Counter-terrorism
Sashastra Seema Bal	97,244	Ministry of Home Affairs	India–Nepal border and India–Bhutan border	Border guard
Railway Protection Force	76,563	Ministry of Railways	Indian Railways	Protection and security of operational areas
Special Frontier Force	10,000	Cabinet Secretariat		Covert operations
Special Protection Group	3,000	Cabinet Secretariat	Security of Prime Minister of India	Executive Protection
Total	1,065,445			

== Ranks and insignia ==
Officers

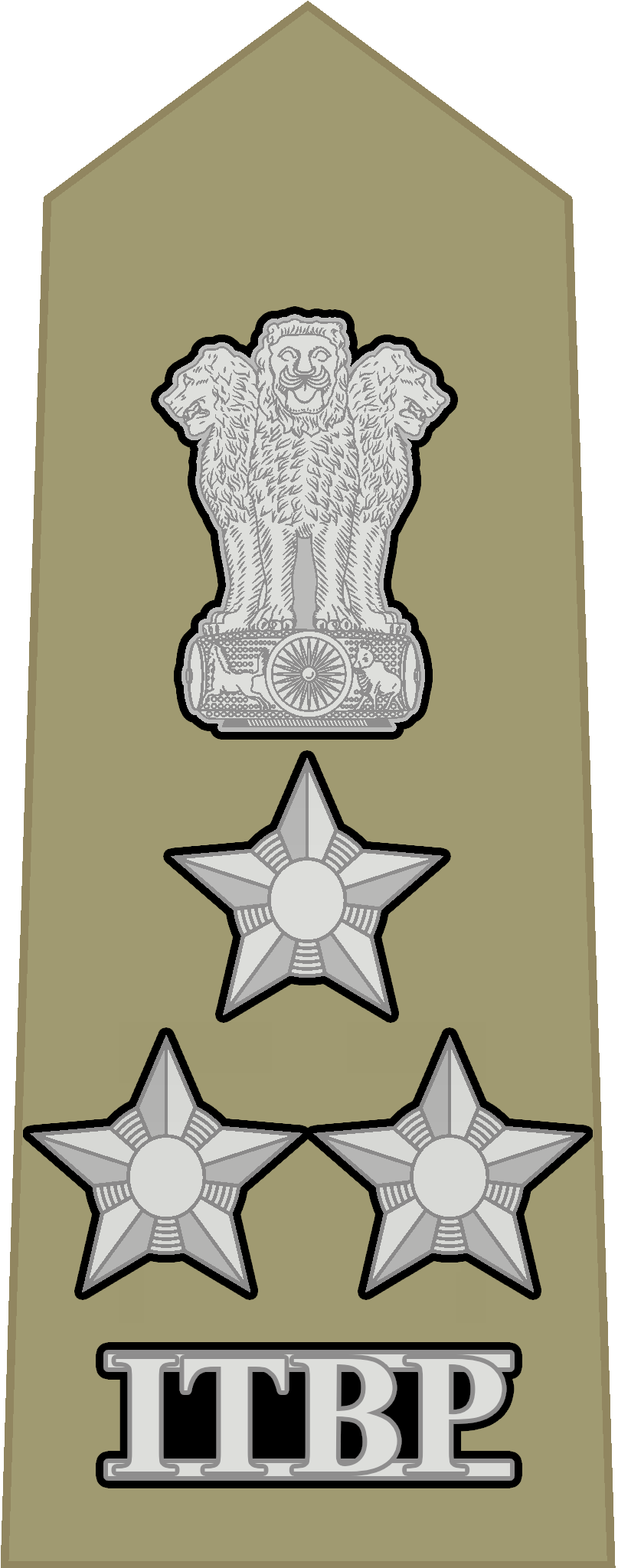
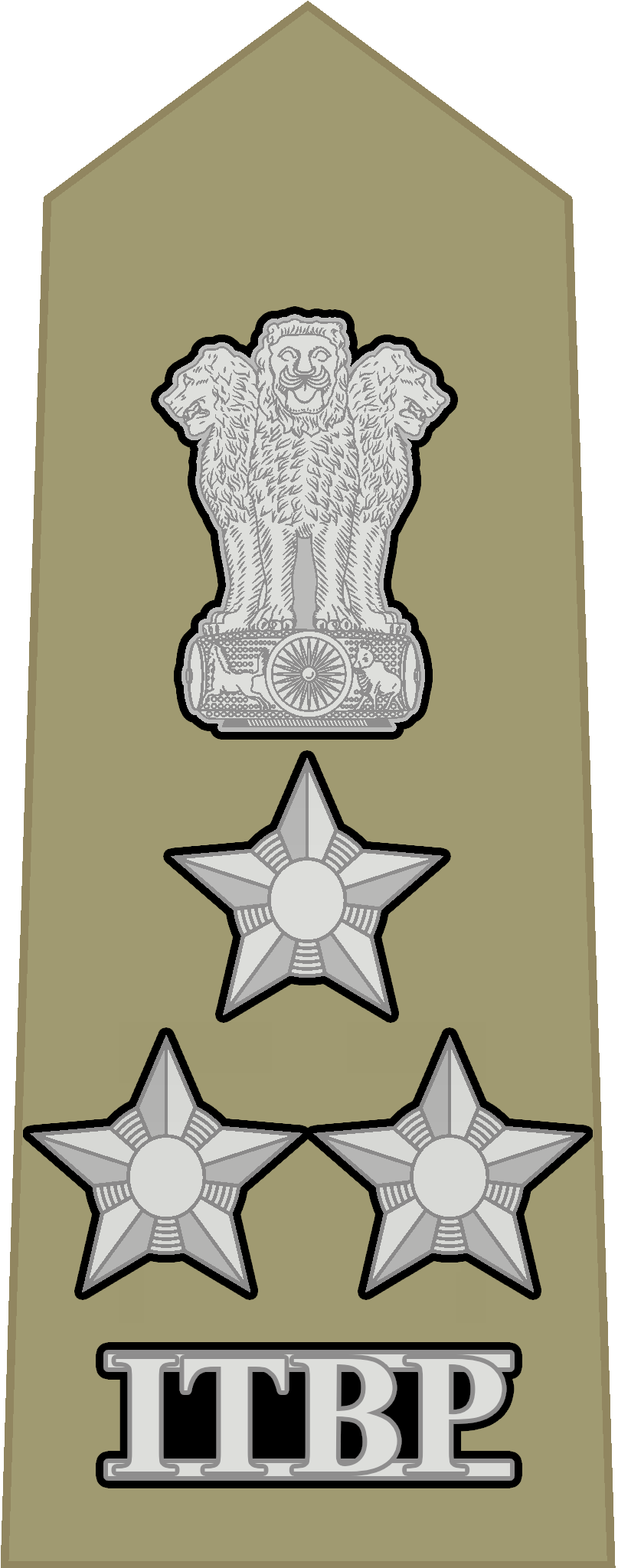
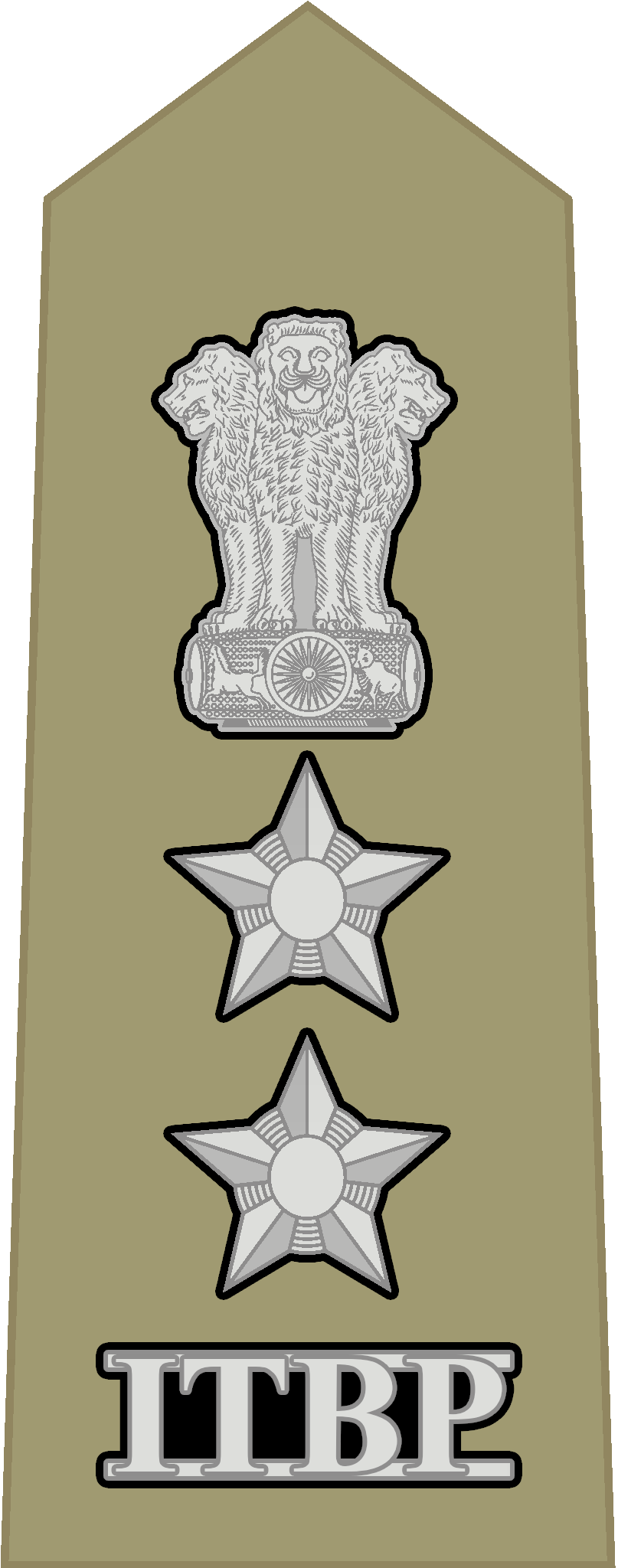
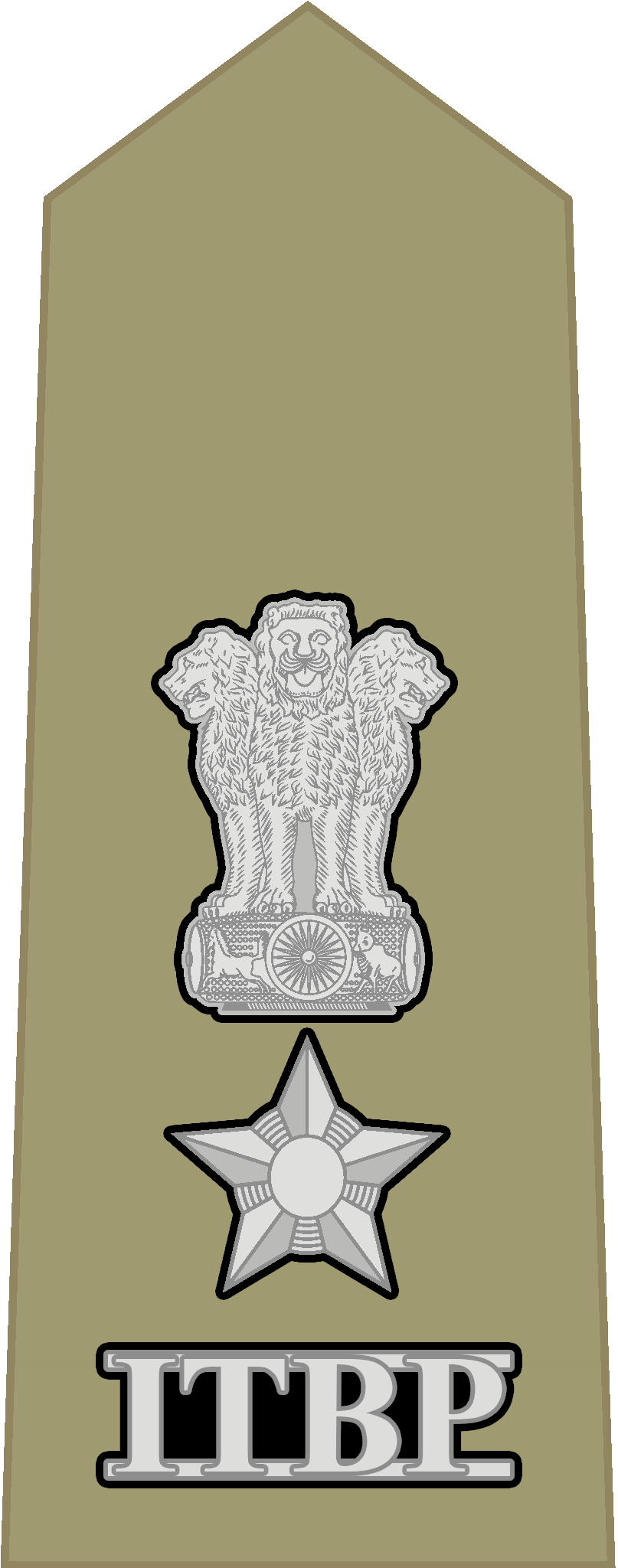
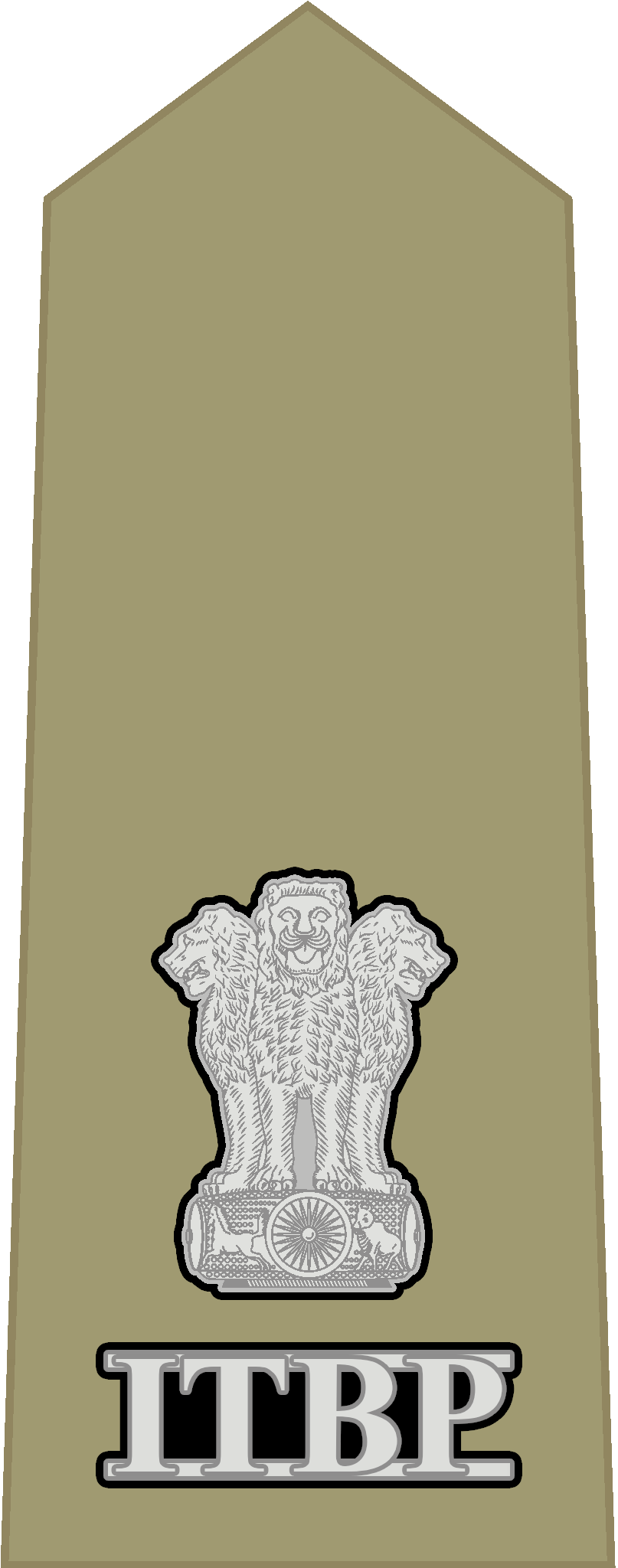
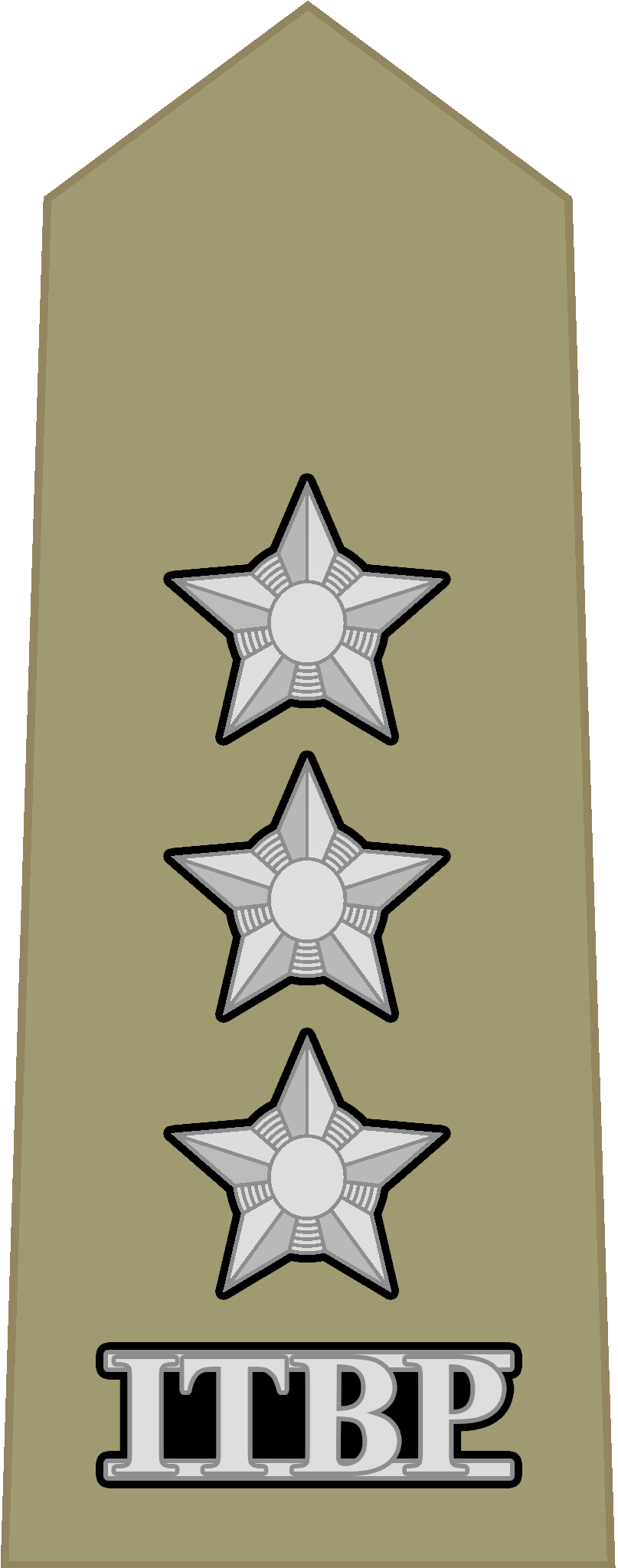
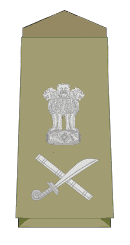
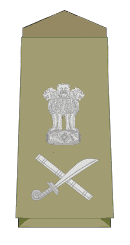
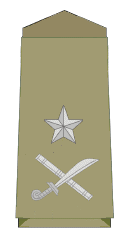
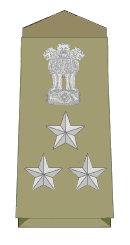
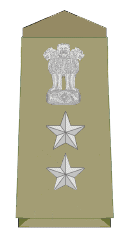
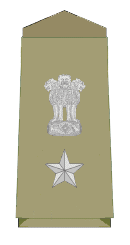
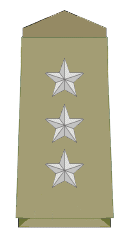
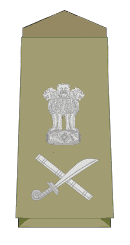
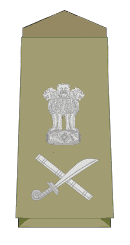
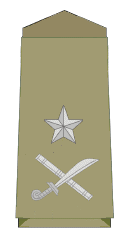
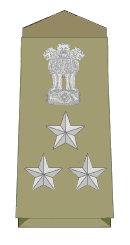
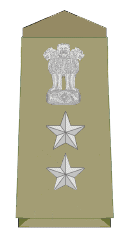
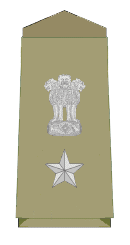
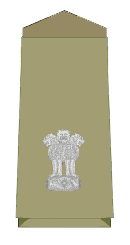
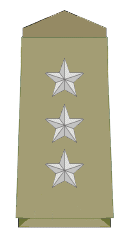
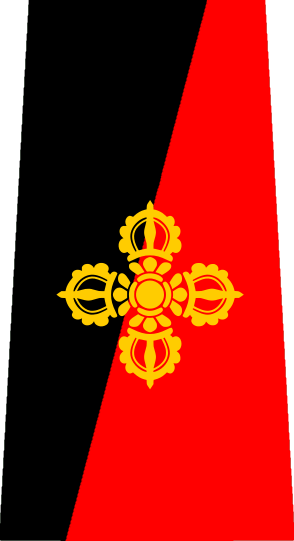
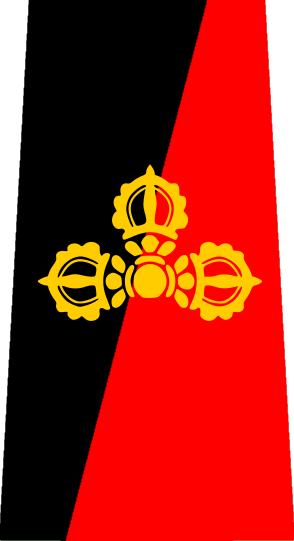
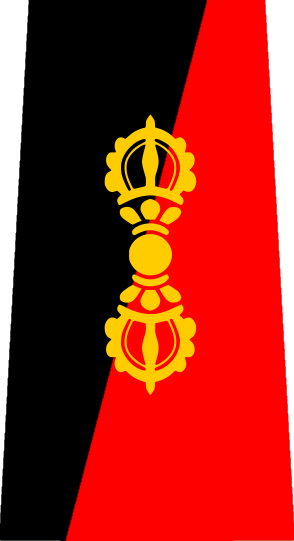
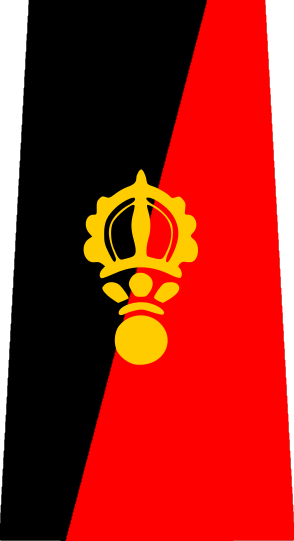
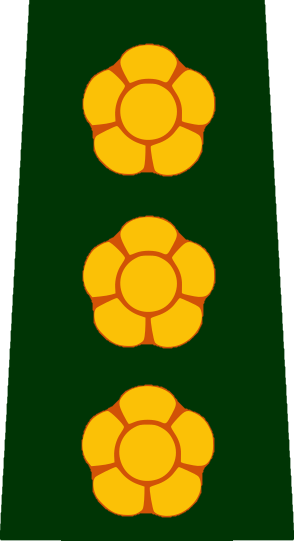
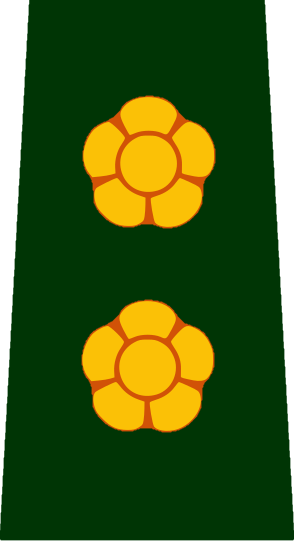
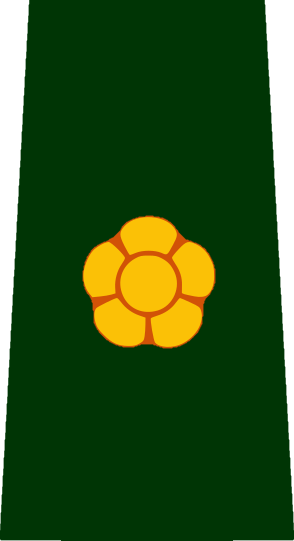
Rank group	General / flag officers					Senior officers			Junior officers
Assam Rifles	Director-general (Note: Equivalent to the rank lieutenant general (लेफ्टिनेंट - जनरल)) - / Special director-general (Note: Equivalent to the rank lieutenant general (लेफ्टिनेंट - जनरल)) - / Additional director-general (Note: Equivalent to the rank lieutenant general (लेफ्टिनेंट - जनरल)) -
Assam Rifles	Director-general - / Special director-general - / Additional director-general -		Inspector general (Note: Equivalent to the rank major general (मेजर - जनरल)) -	Deputy inspector-general (Note: Equivalent to the rank brigadier (ब्रिगेडियर)) -		Commandant (Note: Equivalent to the rank colonel (कर्नल)) -	Second-in-command (Note: Equivalent to the rank lieutenant colonel (लेफ्टिनेंट - कर्नल)) -	Deputy commandant (Note: Equivalent to the rank major (मेजर)) -	Assistant commandant (Note: Equivalent to the rank captain (कप्तान)) -
Border Security Force	Director-general - / Special director-general - / Additional director-general -
Border Security Force	Director-general - / Special director-general - / Additional director-general -		Inspector general -	Deputy inspector-general -		Commandant -	Second-in-command -	Deputy commandant -	Assistant commandant -
Central Industrial Security Force	Director-general - / Special director-general - / Additional director-general -
Central Industrial Security Force	Director-general - / Special director-general - / Additional director-general -		Inspector general -	Deputy inspector-general -		Senior commandant -	Commandant -	Deputy commandant -	Assistant commandant -
Central Reserve Police Force	Director-general - / Special director-general - / Additional director-general -
Central Reserve Police Force	Director-general - / Special director-general - / Additional director-general -		Inspector general -	Deputy inspector-general -		Commandant -	Second-in-command -	Deputy commandant -	Assistant commandant -
Indo-Tibetan Border Police
Indo-Tibetan Border Police	Director-general -	Additional director-general -	Inspector general -	Deputy inspector-general -	Additional deputy inspector-general -	Commandant -	Second-in-command -	Deputy commandant -	Assistant commandant -
National Security Guard
National Security Guard	Director general -	Additional director general -	Inspector general -	Deputy inspector general -		Group commander -	Second in command -	Squadron commander -	Team commander -
Railway Protection Force
Railway Protection Force	Director general	Additional director general	Inspector general/ Principal chief security commissioner	Deputy inspector general/ Chief security commissioner		Senior commandant/ Senior divisional security commissioner	Commandant/ Divisional security commissioner		Assistant commandant/ Assistant security commissioner
Sashastra Seema Bal
Sashastra Seema Bal	Director-general -	Additional director-general -	Inspector general -	Deputy inspector-general -		Commandant -	Second-in-command -	Deputy commandant -	Assistant commandant -
Special Frontier Force
Special Frontier Force				Brigadier		Colonel	Lieutenant colonel	Major	Captain	First Lieutenant	Second Lieutenant
Rank group	General / flag officers					Senior officers			Junior officers

Personnel below officer rank

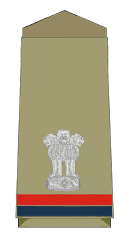
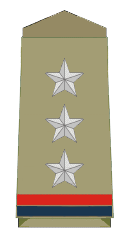
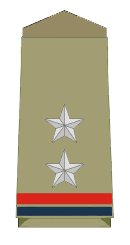
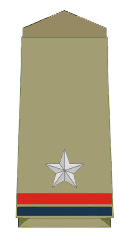
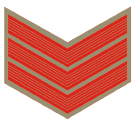
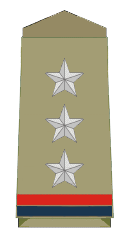
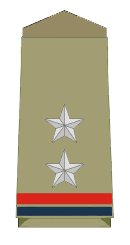
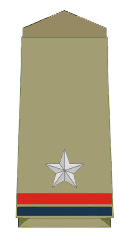
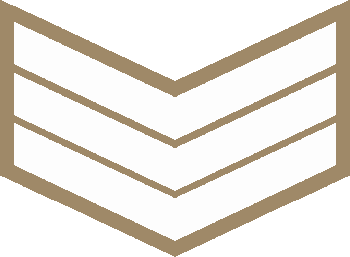
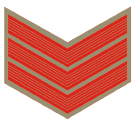
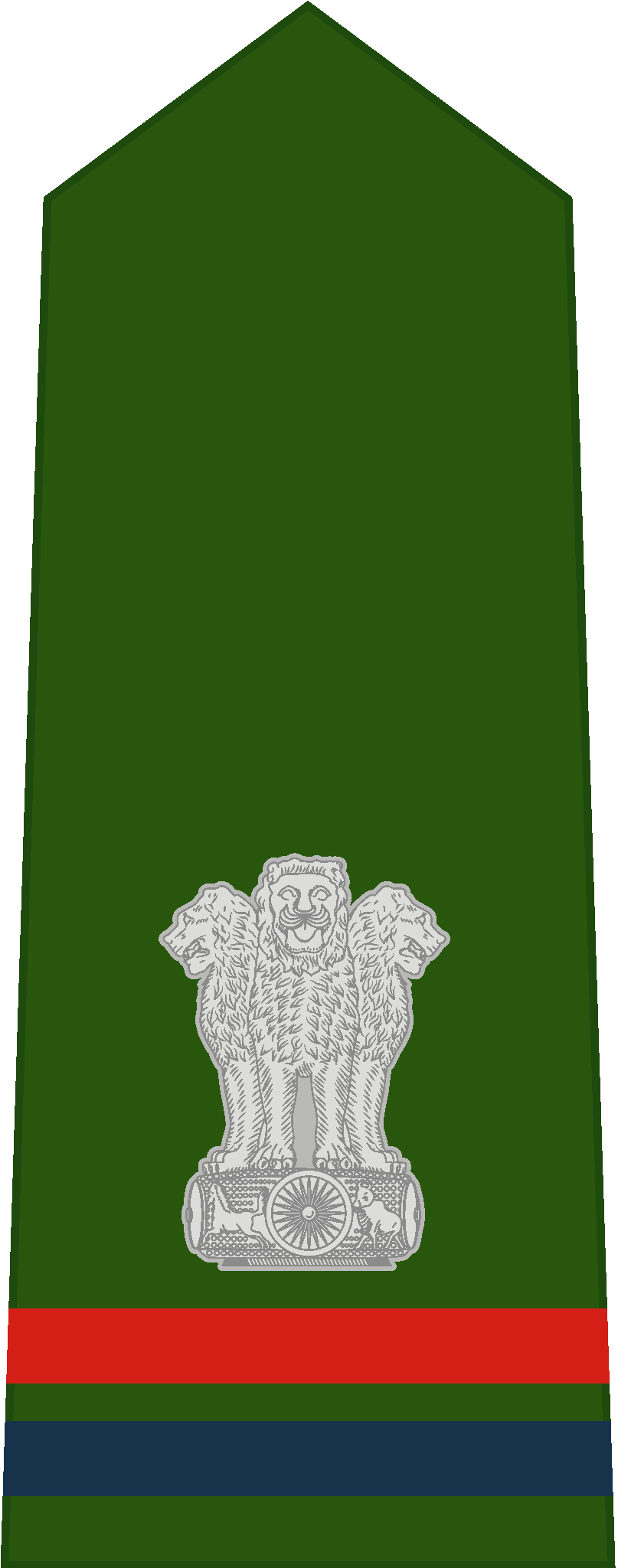
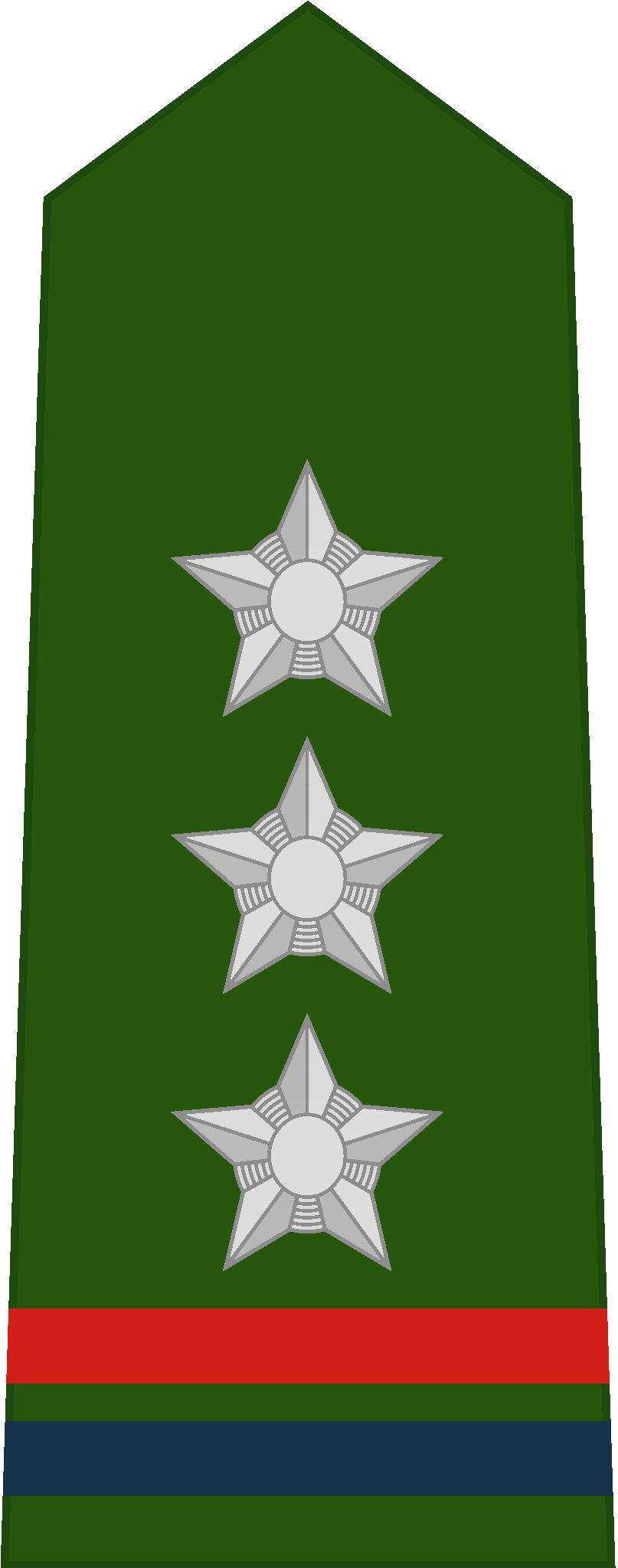
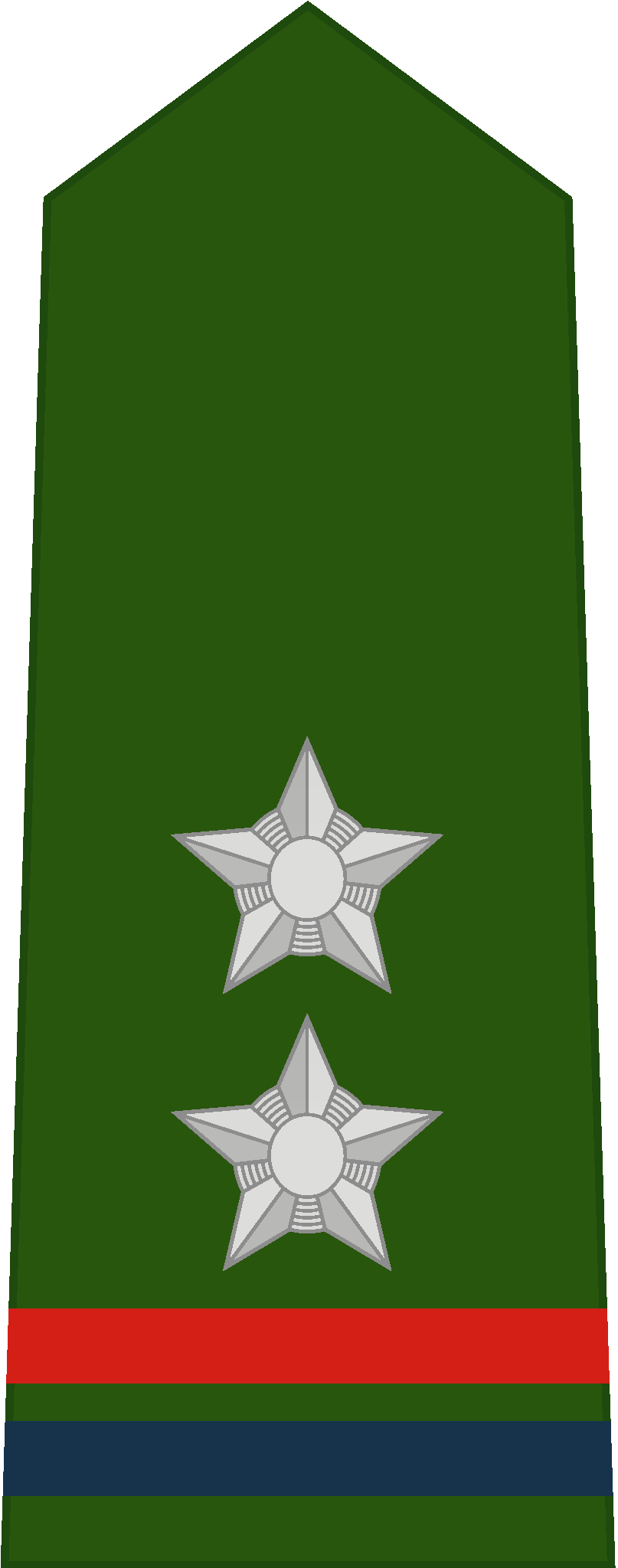
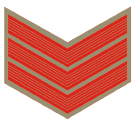
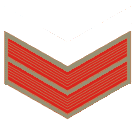
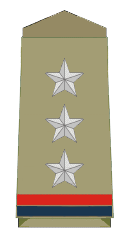
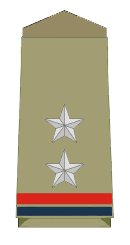
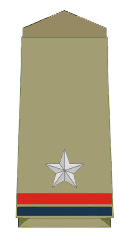
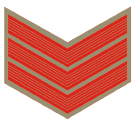
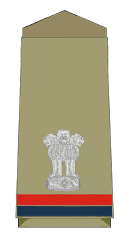
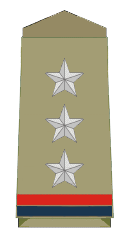
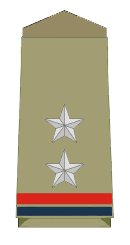
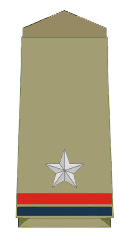
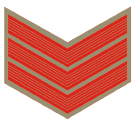
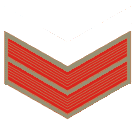
Rank group	Subordinate Officers (SO)				Non commissioned officers (NCO)				Enlisted
Assam Rifles									No insignia
Assam Rifles	Subedar major सूबेदार मेजर	Subedar सूबेदार		Naib subedar नायब सूबेदार	Warrant officer -	Havildar (Note: Equivalent to the rank head constable (-)) हवलदार			Rifleman (Note: Equivalent to the rank constable (-)) -
Border Security Force									No insignia
Border Security Force	Subedar major सूबेदार मेजर	Inspector निरीक्षक	Sub-inspector उप निरीक्षक	Assistant sub-inspector सहायक उप निरीक्षक	Head constable हवलदार				Constable कनिष्ठबल
Central Industrial Security Force									No insignia
Central Industrial Security Force		Inspector निरीक्षक	Sub inspector उप निरीक्षक	Assistant sub-inspector सहायक उप निरीक्षक	Head constable हवलदार				Constable कनिष्ठबल
Central Reserve Police Force									No insignia
Central Reserve Police Force	Subedar major सूबेदार मेजर	Inspector निरीक्षक	Sub-inspector उप निरीक्षक	Assistant sub-inspector सहायक उप निरीक्षक	Head constable हवलदार				Constable कनिष्ठबल
Indo-Tibetan Border Police									No insignia
Indo-Tibetan Border Police	Subedar major सूबेदार मेजर	Subedar/Inspector सूबेदार/निरीक्षक	Sub inspector उप निरीक्षक		Head constable हवलदार		Naik नायक	Lance naik लांस नायक	Constable कनिष्ठबल
National Security Guard									No insignia
National Security Guard	Subedar major सूबेदार मेजर	Assistant commander-1 -	Assistant commander-2 -	Assistant commander-3 -	Ranger grade I -		Ranger grade II -		Combatised tradesmen -
Railway Protection Force									No insignia
Railway Protection Force		Inspector निरीक्षक	Sub inspector उप निरीक्षक	Assistant sub-inspector सहायक उप निरीक्षक	Head constable हवलदार				Constable -
Sashastra Seema Bal									No insignia
Sashastra Seema Bal	Subedar major सूबेदार मेजर	Inspector निरीक्षक	Sub inspector उप निरीक्षक	Assistant sub-inspector सहायक उप निरीक्षक	Head constable हवलदार		Naik नायक	Lance naik लांस नायक	Constable कनिष्ठबल
Special Frontier Force									No insignia
Special Frontier Force	Subedar Major	Subedar		Naib Subedar	Havildar		Naik	Lance Naik	Sepoy
Rank group	Subordinate Officers (SO)				Non commissioned officers (NCO)				Enlisted

== See also ==
- Indian Armed Forces
- Central Armed Police Forces
- State Armed Police Forces
- Special forces of India
- Police ranks and insignia of India
- Indian Police Service
- Indian Army ranks and insignia
- Indian Navy ranks and insignia
- Indian Air Force ranks and insignia
- Indian Coast Guard
- Armed Forces Medical Services
