= Central Reserve Police Force =

Central police force in India

- Emblem of the Central Reserve Police Force

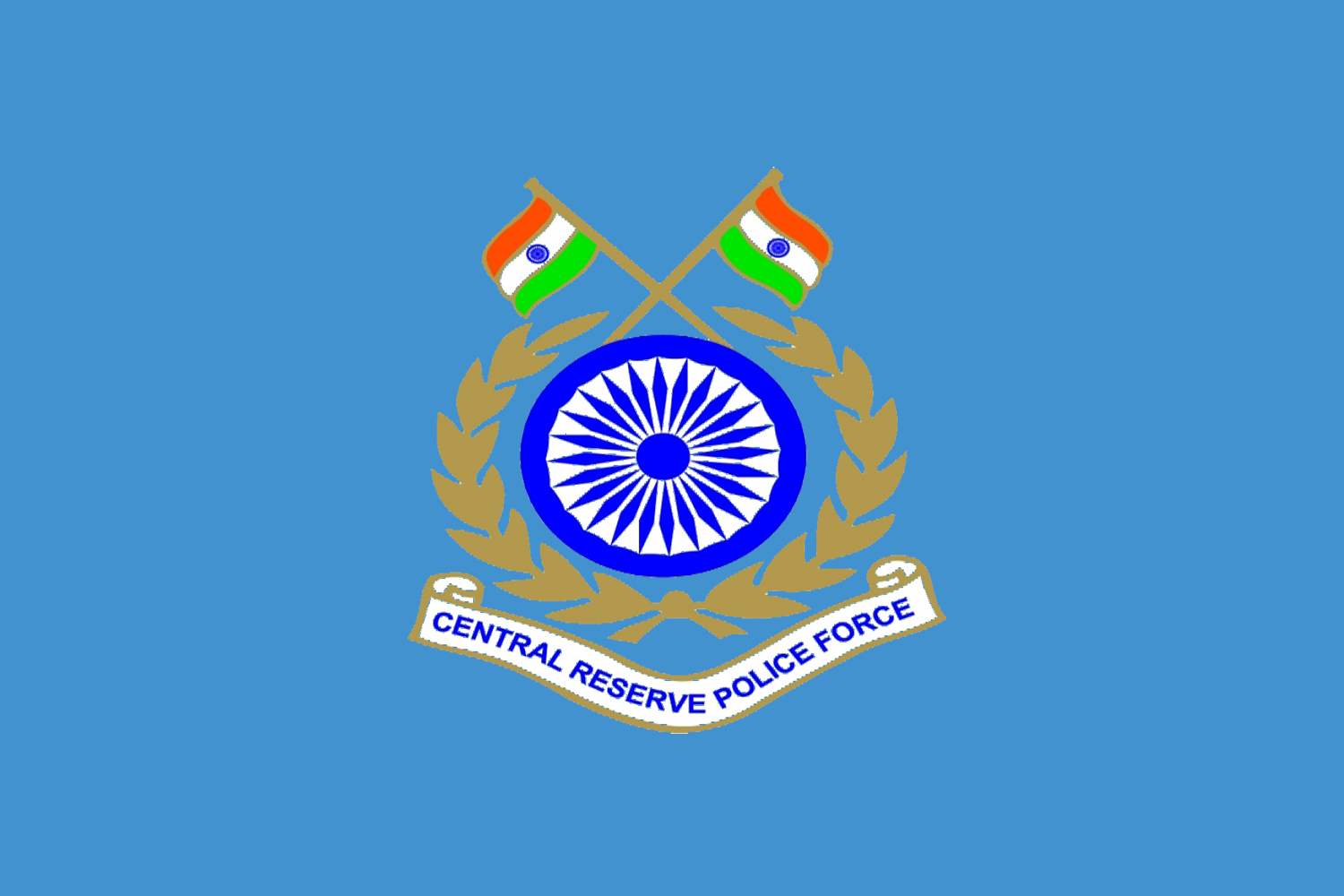
- Flag of the Central Reserve Police Force
- Abbreviation: CRPF
- Motto: Seva aur nisthaa Service and Loyalty

Agency overview
- Formed: 27 July 1939; 87 years ago (as Crown Representative's Police); 28 December 1949; 76 years ago (as Central Reserve Police Force)
- Employees: 312,707 (July 2026)
- Annual budget: ₹38,517.93 crore (US$4.1 billion) (2026–2027)

Jurisdictional structure
- Operations jurisdiction: India
- Governing body: Ministry of Home Affairs
- Constituting instrument: Central Reserve Police Force Act, 1949
- General nature: Gendarmerie

Operational structure
- Headquarters: CGO Complex, Lodhi Road, New Delhi
- Minister responsible: Amit Shah, Union Minister of Home Affairs
- Agency executive: Gyanendra Pratap Singh, IPS, Director General
- Units: List: Commando Battalion for Resolute Action; Rapid Action Force; CRPF QAT; Special Duty Group; VIP Security Group

Notables
- Programmes: Operation All Out (J&K); Anti-Naxal Operations (LWE Region)
- Anniversary: Valour Day (9 April) Police Commemoration Day (21 October)

Website
- crpf.gov.in

The Central Reserve Police Force (CRPF) is the largest Central Armed Police Force in India, under the Ministry of Home Affairs, Government of India. It is India's national gendarmerie (paramilitary), assisting states and union territories in the upkeep of law and order and internal security. Its duties include counterinsurgency operations, combating Maoist insurgency, riot control, election security and the protection of government installations.

The force was established on 27 July 1939 at Neemuch as the 'Crown Representative's Police', initially comprising a single battalion tasked with maintaining law and order in the princely states of British India. Following Indian independence, it was renamed the Central Reserve Police Force on 28 December 1949 under the Central Reserve Police Force Act, 1949. It comprises 248 battalions and specialised units, including the Rapid Action Force (RAF), established for riot control and public order operations, and the Commando Battalion for Resolute Action (CoBRA), specialising in jungle warfare and counter-Maoist operations.

Today, it is the largest central armed police force, comprising 248 battalions and exceeding a total strength of 312,707 personnel (2026).

== History ==
Originally constituted as the Crown Representative Police in 1939, CRP was raised in response to the political unrest and agitations in the then Princely States of India following the Madras Resolution of the All-India Congress Committee in 1936 and the ever-growing desire of the Crown Representative to help the vast majority of the native States preserve law and order as part of imperial policy.

After Independence, the force was renamed the Central Reserve Police Force by an Act of Parliament on 28 December 1949. This Act constituted CRPF as an armed force of the Union. Sardar Vallabhbhai Patel, the then Home Minister, visualised a multi-dimensional role for it in tune with the changing needs of a newly independent nation. The force played a significant role during the amalgamation of the princely States into the Indian Union. It helped the Union Government discipline the rebellious princely state of Junagadh and the small principality of Kathiawar in Gujarat, which had declined to join the Indian Union.

During the early 1950s, the performance of the CRPF detachments in enforcing law and order in Bhuj, the then Patiala and East Punjab States Union and Chambal ravines was appreciated by all quarters.

On 21 October 1959, SI Karam Singh and 20 other CRPF personnel were attacked by the Chinese Army at Hot Springs in Ladakh, resulting in 10 casualties. The survivors were imprisoned. Since then, 21 October has been observed as Police Commemoration Day nationwide, across all states in India.

In the late 50s and early 60s, contingents of the CRPF were sent to Kutch, Rajasthan, and Sindh borders to check infiltration and trans-border crimes. They were, subsequently, deployed on the Pakistan border in Jammu and Kashmir following attacks launched by the Pakistani infiltrators.

During the Sino-Indian War of 1962, the Force once again assisted the Indian Army in Arunachal Pradesh. Eight CRPF personnel were killed in action. In the 1965 and 1971 Indo-Pak wars, the Force also fought shoulder-to-shoulder with the Indian Army, both on the Western and Eastern borders.

For the first time in history, thirteen companies of CRPF were airlifted to join the Indian Peace Keeping Force in Sri Lanka to fight the militant cadres. Besides, CRPF personnel were also sent to Haiti, Namibia, Somalia, and Maldives to deal with the law and order situation there, as a part of the UN Peacekeeping Force.

In the late seventies, when extremist elements disturbed the peace in Tripura and Manipur, CRPF battalions were deployed in strength. Simultaneously, there was turmoil in the Brahmaputra Valley. The CRPF had to be inducted in strength not only to maintain law and order but also to keep lines of communication free from disruption. The commitments of the Force continue to be very high in the Northeast in dealing with the insurgency.

== Organization ==
=== Administration ===
The CRPF is headed by a Director General and is assisted by 3 Additional Directors General, 9 Inspectors General, a Financial Advisor, and a Director (Medical). It is divided into ten administrative sectors, each headed by an Inspector General. Each sector consists of one or more administrative and/or operational ranges, headed by an officer of the rank of deputy inspector general (DIG) of Police. Now, Group Centres are also headed by DIGs. The Financial Advisor of the CRPF has been an Indian Revenue Service officer of the rank of Joint Secretary and also has Deputy Advisors from the Indian Audit and Accounts Service or the Indian Telecom.

=== Subdivisions ===
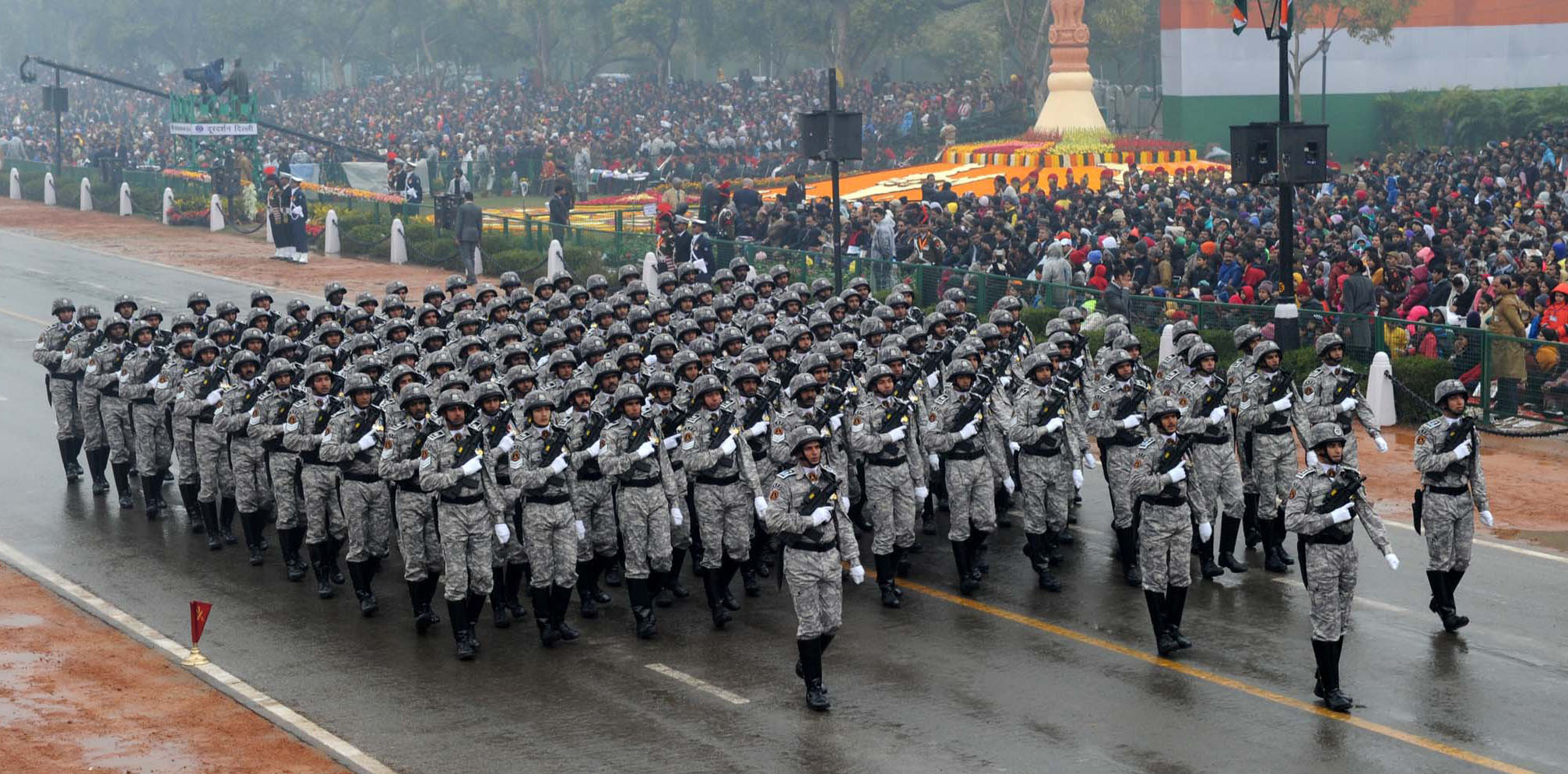
CRPF (CoBRA) personnel during the Republic Day Parade, 2015.

There are 248 battalions of approximately 1,200 each. Each battalion is commanded by a commanding officer of the rank Commandant, and consists of seven CRPF companies, each containing 135 men. Each company is headed by an Assistant Commandant,(Company Commander).

The Ministry of Home Affairs planned to raise 2 Group Centers, 2 Range HQs, 1 Sector HQ, and 12 new battalions including a Mahila (all-female) battalion by 2019.

The CRPF is organised into a headquarters, three attached wings, and four zones. An attached wing is headed by an additional director general and is subdivided into branches which are headed by an inspector general. A zone is either headed by an additional director general or a special director general. A zone is subdivided into sectors where each sector is headed by an inspector general.

Zone	Branch / zone in-charge	Branch / sector
Headquarters	Shri Sandeep Khirwar, IPS, SDG	Establishment
Headquarters	Shri Sandeep Khirwar, IPS, SDG	Personnel
Headquarters	Shri Sandeep Khirwar, IPS, SDG	Provisioning
Headquarters	Shri Sandeep Khirwar, IPS, SDG	Works
Headquarters	Shri Sandeep Khirwar, IPS, SDG	Finance
Operations	Shri Vitul Kumar, IPS, SDG	Administration
Operations	Shri Vitul Kumar, IPS, SDG	CoBRA
Operations	Shri Vitul Kumar, IPS, SDG	Comms & IT
Operations	Shri Vitul Kumar, IPS, SDG	Intelligence
Operations	Shri Vitul Kumar, IPS, SDG	RAF
Operations	Shri Vitul Kumar, IPS, SDG	V.S.
Training	Shri Deepak Kumar, IPS, SDG	Training Institutions
Training	Shri Deepak Kumar, IPS, SDG	ISA Mt. Abu
CRPF Academy	Shri Deepak Kumar, IPS, SDG	CRPF Academy
North-East (Spl. DG-GTY)	Shri Raja Srivastava, IPS, SDG	Jorhat
North-East (Spl. DG-GTY)	Shri Raja Srivastava, IPS, SDG	Manipur and Nagaland
North-East (Spl. DG-GTY)	Shri Raja Srivastava, IPS, SDG	Tripura
North-East (Spl. DG-GTY)	Shri Raja Srivastava, IPS, SDG	North Eastern
Southern (ADG-HYD)	Shri Sandeep Khirwar, IPS, ADG	Western
Southern (ADG-HYD)	Shri Sandeep Khirwar, IPS, ADG	Southern
Southern (ADG-HYD)	Shri Sandeep Khirwar, IPS, ADG	Karnataka-Kerala
Central (Spl. DG-KOL)	Shri Amit Kumar, IPS, SDG	Bihar
Central (Spl. DG-KOL)	Shri Amit Kumar, IPS, SDG	Central
Central (Spl. DG-KOL)	Shri Amit Kumar, IPS, SDG	Madhya Pradesh
Central (Spl. DG-KOL)	Shri Amit Kumar, IPS, SDG	Eastern
Central (Spl. DG-KOL)	Shri Amit Kumar, IPS, SDG	Odisha
Central (Spl. DG-KOL)	Shri Amit Kumar, IPS, SDG	Chhattisgarh
Central (Spl. DG-KOL)	Shri Amit Kumar, IPS, SDG	Jharkhand
Central (Spl. DG-KOL)	Shri Amit Kumar, IPS, SDG	West Bengal
Jammu & Kashmir (Spl. DG-JMU)	Shri Rajesh Kumar, IPS, SDG	Jammu
Jammu & Kashmir (Spl. DG-JMU)	Shri Rajesh Kumar, IPS, SDG	Northern
Jammu & Kashmir (Spl. DG-JMU)	Shri Rajesh Kumar, IPS, SDG	Rajasthan
Jammu & Kashmir (Spl. DG-JMU)	Shri Rajesh Kumar, IPS, SDG	North Western
Jammu & Kashmir (Spl. DG-JMU)	Shri Rajesh Kumar, IPS, SDG	Srinagar
Jammu & Kashmir (Spl. DG-JMU)	Shri Rajesh Kumar, IPS, SDG	Operations Kashmir

Details of the composition of zones:

- Central Zone - 8 sectors, 24 Ranges, 19 Group Centres, 91 administrative battalions, 98 operational battalions. 9 Composite Hospitals. 2 Central Workshops, 1 Armament Workshop, 2 Central Training Centres, 3 Recruit Training Centres, and 1 Central Institute of Advanced Training.
- Jammu & Kashmir Zone - 6 sectors (including 1 Operations Sector). 80 operational battalions (including Chandigarh 1 Mahila Bn) are deployed in the area of responsibility of this Zone.
- Southern Zone - The zone has 3 sectors consisting of 07 Ranges (including one Operations range), 8 Group Centres, 7 Composite Hospitals, 1 Station Hospital, 1 Central Weapon Store, 2 Arms Work Shop, 2 Central Training College, 2 Recruit Training College, 1 Dog Breeding & Training School at Taralu, 1 Improvised Explosive Device School at Pune, 1 College of Information Technology at Bangalore, 1 National Institute of Jungle Craft at Belgaum, 1 Training Node at Hyderabad, CIAT Chittoor, 3 National Disaster Response Force Battalions, 3 Mahila Battalions at Nagpur, Gandhinagar and Bangalore, 38 Administrative Battalions, 19 Operational Battalions and 5 Rapid Action Force (RAF) Battalions.
- North East Zone - The zone has 4 sectors consisting of 6 Group Centres, 60 battalions, 1 CoBRA battalion, 1 Central Institute of Advanced Training, 1 Composite Hospital (100 beds), and 2 Composite Hospitals (50 beds).

== Jurisdiction ==
The CRPF has all-India jurisdiction and can be deployed anywhere in India for assigned internal-security and crowd control, and election duties. It generally assists the state police in maintaining law and order and does not ordinarily replace their primary jurisdiction.

== Major Subunits ==
RAF contingent in a parade

=== Rapid Action Force ===
The Rapid Action Force (RAF) is a specialised unit under the CRPF. It has a total strength of 15 battalions and was formed in October 1992 as a riot control force to deal with communal and related civil unrest. The battalions are numbered from 99 to 108. The RAF is a zero-response force intended to quickly respond to a crisis.

It was the recipient of the President's Colour Award presented by Shri L.K. Advani, then Deputy Prime Minister of India, on 7 October 2003 for "its selfless service to the nation in the 11th year of coming into existence".

The smallest functional unit in the force is a 'Team' commanded by an inspector, which has three components — a riot control element, a tear gas element, and a fire element. It has been organised as an independent strike unit.

One team in each company of the RAF is composed of female personnel to deal more effectively with situations where the force faces women demonstrators.

=== Special Duty Group ===
It is a battalion-sized unit of the CRPF tasked with providing security for the outer cordon of the Prime Minister's official residence on 7, Race Course Road and his office in the North Block as well as during outdoor functions. It comprises around 1,000 personnel.

On 20 May 2024, the Parliamentary Duty Group (PDG) of CRPF ceased to function and was merged with the VIP security wing of the force as the security of parliament house was handed over to the CISF by the government due to a security breach issue.

=== CoBRA ===
Commando Battalion for Resolute Action (CoBRA) is the special operations unit of CRPF created in 2008 to deal with the Naxalite insurgency in India. This specialised CRPF unit is one of the few units of the Central Armed Police Forces in the country that are specifically trained in guerrilla warfare. This elite fighting unit has been trained to track, hunt, and eliminate small Naxalite groups. There are currently 10 battalion-sized COBRA units.

10 CoBRA units raised between 2008 and 2011 have been trained, equipped, and deployed.

CoBRA was awarded four Shaurya Chakras, one Kirti Chakra, one PPMG, 117 PMGs, and 1267 DG commendations.

== Personnel ==
=== Rank structure ===
The organisation is structured mainly on three rank categories, which include Gazetted Officers (GOs), Subordinate Officers (SOs), and Non-Gazetted Officers (NGOs). The Assistant Commandants are Group 'A' Gazetted officers, directly appointed upon clearing an exam conducted by the UPSC, which is held yearly.

Officers

Rank group	General / flag officers			Senior officers			Junior officers
Central Reserve Police Force	Director-general - / Special director-general - / Additional director-general -
Central Reserve Police Force	Director-general - / Special director-general - / Additional director-general -	Inspector general -	Deputy inspector-general -	Commandant -	Second-in-command -	Deputy commandant -	Assistant commandant -
Police equivalent	Director General (DGP) / Director General (DG) / Additional; Director General (ADGP)	Inspector General (IGP)	Deputy Inspector General (DIG)	Senior Superintendent (SSP)	Superintendent (SP)	Additional Superintendent (Addl.SP)	Deputy Superintendent (DSP/ASP)	No equivalent
Army equivalent	Lieutenant general	Major general	Brigadier	Colonel	Lieutenant colonel	Major	Captain	Lieutenant

Other ranks

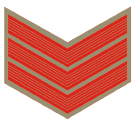
Rank group	Subordinate Officers (SO)				Non commissioned officers (NCO)	Enlisted
Central Reserve Police Force						No insignia
Central Reserve Police Force	Subedar major सूबेदार मेजर	Inspector निरीक्षक	Sub-inspector उप निरीक्षक	Assistant sub-inspector सहायक उप निरीक्षक	Head constable हवलदार	Constable कनिष्ठबल

Being a central Indian police agency and having a high presence of Indian Police Service officers, CRPF follows ranks and insignia similar to other police organisations in India.

=== List of Directors General ===
V. G. Kanetkar was the first director general of the Central Reserve Police Force, serving from 3 August 1968 to 15 September 1969. The current director general has been Gyanendra Pratap Singh in office since 20 January 2025.

Sr No.	Name	From	Till
1	V. G. Kanetkar	3 August 1968	15 September 1969
2	Imdad Ali	16 September 1969	28 February 1973
3	B. B. Mishra	1 March 1973	30 September 1974
4	N. S. Saxena	30 September 1974	31 May 1977
5	S. M. Ghosh	1 June 1977	31 July 1978
6	R. C. Gopal	31 July 1978	10 August 1979
7	P. R. Rajagopal	10 August 1979	30 March 1980
8	Birbal Nath	13 May 1980	3 September 1980
9	R. N. Sheopory	3 September 1980	31 December 1981
10	S. D. Chowdhury	27 January 1982	30 April 1983
11	Shiva Swaroop	30 July 1983	7 May 1985
12	J. F. Ribeiro	4 June 1985	8 July 1985
13	T. G. L. Iyer	July 1985	Nov 1985
14	S. D. Pandey	1 November 1985	31 March 1988
15	P. G. Harlankar	1 April 1988	30 September 1990
16	Kanwar Pal Singh Gill	19 December 1990	8 November 1991
17	S. Subramanian	9 November 1991	31 January 1992
18	D. P. N. Singh	1 February 1992	30 November 1993
19	S. V. M. Tripathi	1 December 1993	30 June 1996
20	M. B. Kaushal	1 October 1996	12 November 1997
21	M. N. Sabharwal	2 December 1997	31 July 2000
22	Trinath Mishra	31 July-2000	31 December 2002
23	S. C. Chaube	31 December 2002	31 January 2004
24	J. K. Sinha	31 January 2004	28 February 2007
25	S. I. S. Ahmed	1 March 2007	31 March 2008
26	V. K. Joshi	31 March 2008	28 February 2009
27	A. S. Gill	28 February 2009	31 January 2010
28	Vikram Srivastava	31 January 2010	6 October 2010
29	K. Vijay Kumar	7 October 2010	30 September 2012
30	Pranay Sahay	1 October 2012	31 July 2013
31	Dilip Trivedi	17 August 2013	30 November 2014
32	Prakash Mishra	1 December 2014	29 February 2016
33	K. Durga Prasad	1 March 2016	28 February 2017
34	Rajiv Rai Bhatnagar	27 April 2017	13 January 2020
35	Dr. Anand Prakash Maheshwari	13 January 2020	28 February 2021
36	Kuldeep Singh	16 March 2021	30 September 2022
37	Dr. Sujoy Lal Thaosen	1 October 2022	31 December 2023
38	Anish Dayal Singh	1 January 2024	31 December 2024
39	Gyanendra Pratap Singh	20 January 2025	Incumbent

== Awards ==
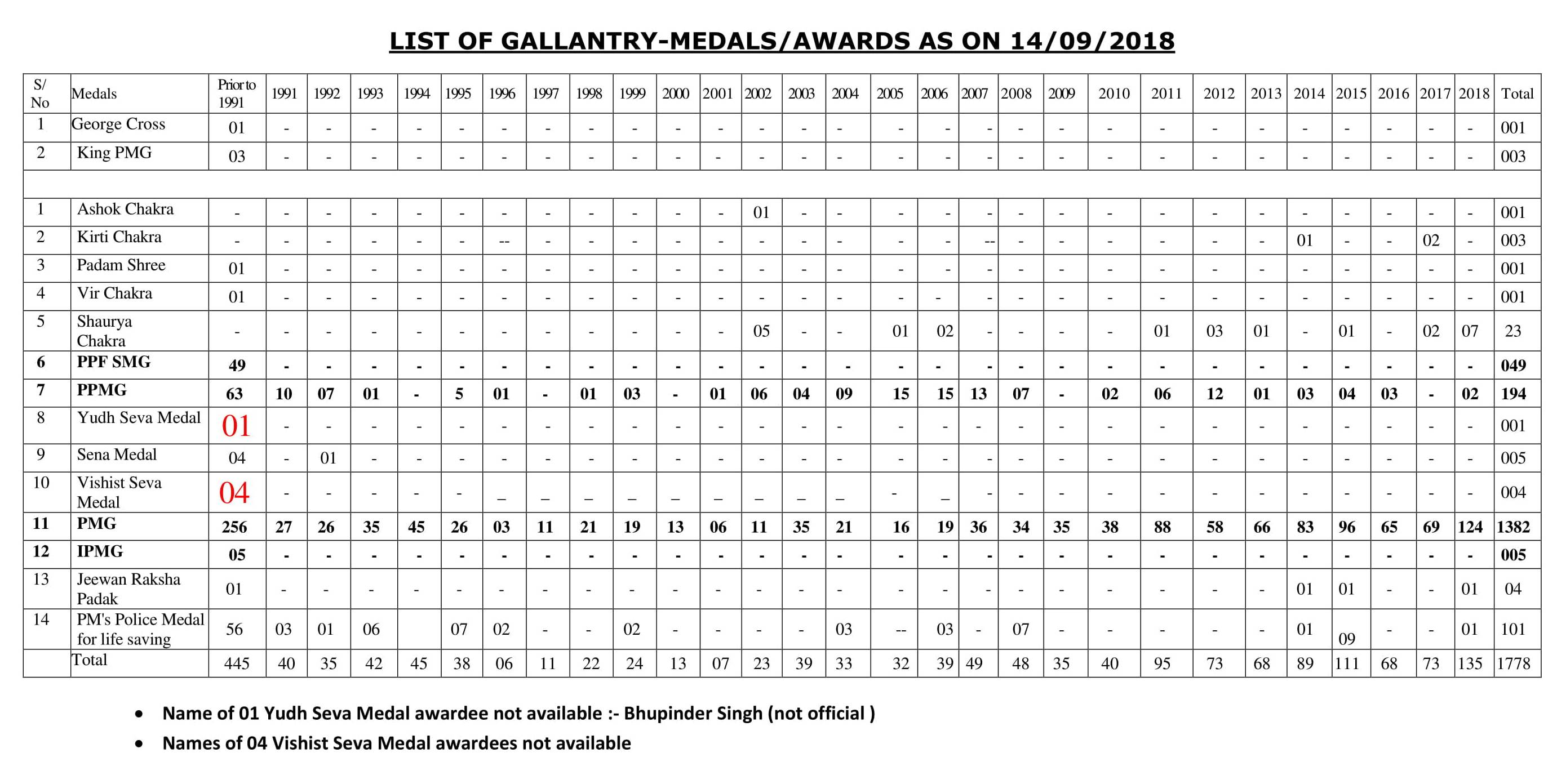
List of Gallantry-Medals/Awards as on 14 September 2018

Members of the CRPF have been awarded 2468 medals.

Sl No	Medal Name	Numbers
01	George Cross	01
02	King's Police Medal for Gallantry	03
03	Ashok Chakra	01
04	Kirti Chakra	14
05	Padma Shri	01
06	Vir Chakra	01
07	Shaurya Chakra	50
08	President's Police and Fire Services Medal for Gallantry	49
09	President's Police Medal for Gallantry	203
10	Yudh Seva Medal	01
11	Sena Medal	05
11	Vishisht Seva Medal	04
12	Police Medal for Gallantry	2054
13	Medal for Gallantry (GM)	136
13	IPMG	05
14	Jeevan Raksha Padak	07
15	Prime Minister's Police Medal for Life Saving	114
Total		2649

CRPF bagged the highest number of gallantry medals amongst all paramilitary forces. The force was awarded 30 gallantry medals on Republic Day 2022.

== In popular culture ==
The acronym CRPF has been expanded as "Chalte Raho Pyare Force" (lit. 'Keep moving my friend force' or 'Keep Moving, Beloved Force') since they are constantly on the move from one troubled place in India to another.

== See also ==
- Ministry of Home Affairs
- Border Security Force
- Indo-Tibetan Border Police
- Central Industrial Security Force
- Sashastra Seema Bal
- Assam Rifles
- National Security Guard
- Border outpost
- Operation Green Hunt
- Indian Coast Guard
- Central Reserve Police Force SC
- Internal Security Academy
