= Central Armed Police Forces =

Central Armed police forces of India

Agency overview
- Annual budget: ₹116,789.30 crore (US$12 billion) (2026–27)
- Legal personality: Government organisations

Jurisdictional structure
- Operations jurisdiction: India
- Governing body: Government of India
- Specialist jurisdictions: Paramilitary law enforcement, counter insurgency, riot control; National border patrol, security, integrity; Buildings and other fixed assets

Operational structure
- Elected officer responsible: Amit Shah, Minister of Home Affairs
- Parent agency: Ministry of Home Affairs
- Child agencies: Assam Rifles; Border Security Force; Central Industrial Security Force; Central Reserve Police Force; Indo-Tibetan Border Police; National Security Guard; Sashastra Seema Bal

Website
- mha.gov.in/central-armed-police-forces

The Central Armed Police Forces (CAPF) are a group of seven armed forces under the Ministry of Home Affairs, Government of India, tasked with maintaining internal security, law and order, counterinsurgency, and protecting borders. As of 2026, the combined strength of CAPF with Assam Rifles is 10,04,482.

The CAPF is classified into three groups: Border Guarding Forces (Assam Rifles, Border Security Force, Indo-Tibetan Border Police, and Sashastra Seema Bal), Forces for Internal Security (Central Industrial Security Force and Central Reserve Police Force), and Special Task Force (National Security Guard). While the Assam Rifles is administratively under the MHA and part of the CAPF, its operational control is handled by the Indian Army. These forces are categorized under the "other armed forces" in the Central List of the Constitution of India and function in accordance with Article 355, which mandates the Central to protect states against "external aggression" and "internal disturbances". Since "police" and "public order" fall under the State List, CAPF units are deployed to support state governments as required, while their powers, jurisdiction, privileges, and liabilities remain under the control of the Central government as specified in the Central List.

== Terminology ==
CAPF were formerly known as Central Paramilitary Forces (CPMF), also variously referred to by Central Police Organisations (CPOs), Paramilitary Forces (PMF), and Central Police Forces (CPF) interchangeably. In 2011, the Government of India released a circular adopting a uniform nomenclature to change the name of the forces to Central Armed Police Forces under the Ministry of Home Affairs. Initially, only five forces—BSF, CRPF, CISF, ITBP, and SSB were covered under the new nomenclature, since AR was under the operational control of the Indian Army, and NSG personnel were completely deputed from the Indian Army and other CAPFs.

The name change was made for political reasons, to improve the international impression of the force, since in some countries the paramilitary refers to militant groups. Currently, all the seven forces are listed under the CAPF definition by the Ministry.

== Role ==
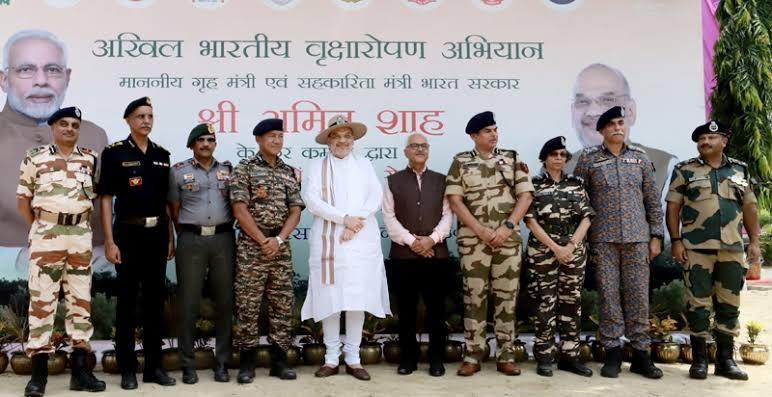
Hon'ble Home Minister of India Shri Amit Shah with the Central Home Secretary and Chiefs of the CAPFs

Central Armed Police Forces are organised with the primary role of border guarding for AR, BSF, ITBP, SSB; Security of sensitive establishments by CISF, Assisting Police to tackle Law & Order, Counter-Terrorist Operations, Counter-Naxal Operations by CRPF, NSG. Apart from the primary role, all CAPFs are involved in assisting the Police in Law & Order situations and also the Army in Counter-Terrorist Operations. BSF, ITBP, and CRPF have assisted the army during external aggression in the past. CAPFs work along with both Indian Army & Police in different roles assigned to them.

Central Armed Police Forces personnel also serve in various important organisations such as Research and Analysis Wing (RAW), Special Protection Group (SPG), National Investigation Agency (NIA), Intelligence Bureau (IB), Central Bureau of Investigation (CBI), National Disaster Response Force (NDRF), Narcotics Control Bureau (NCB), State Armed Police Force (Jharkhand Jaguars, Bihar Military Police, UP/MP STF, DRG, IRB, Chattishgarh Armed Police etc.) on deputation and have attachment/training in various levels/formations/courses along with the Indian Army.The role and performance of the force are critical given its operational responsibilities in assisting civil authorities during emergency situations.

== Organisations ==
=== Assam Rifles (AR) ===
The Assam Rifles is paramilitary force of india responsible for border security, counter-insurgency, and law and order in Northeast India. Its primary role is to guard the 1,643-kilometre-long Indo-Myanmar border. The AR comes under the administration of the Ministry of Home Affairs (MHA), while its operational control is maintained by the Indian Army. It is the oldest paramilitary force in India.

=== Border Security Force (BSF) ===
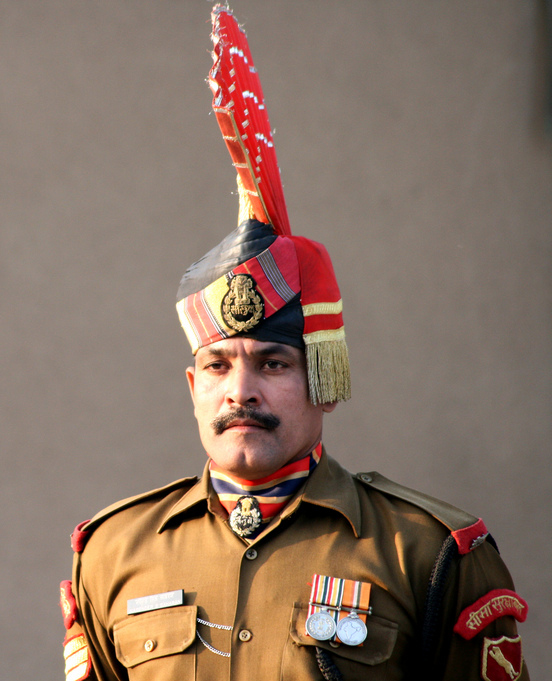
A member of India's Border Security Force in ceremonial attire

The primary role of the Border Security Force is to guard the Indo-Pakistan and Indo-Bangladesh borders; it is deployed both on the international border and the LOC. The BSF also has active roles during times of war. It has 292,000 personnel in 192 battalions. The 1, 2 and 7 battalion of NDRF are requisitioned from BSF. It is also known for being the largest dedicated border guarding force in the world.

=== Central Industrial Security Force (CISF) ===
One of the largest industrial security forces in the world, the Central Industrial Security Force provides security to various Public Sector Undertakings (PSUs) and other critical infrastructure installations, major airports across the country and provides security during elections and other internal security duties and VVIP protection. It has a total strength of about 160,500 personnel in 132 battalions, including 12 reserve battalions.

=== Central Reserve Police Force (CRPF) ===
The Central Reserve Police Force is the largest of the Central Armed Police Forces units with 313,678 personnel in 247 battalions. The Central Reserve Police includes:

- The Rapid Action Force (RAF), a 15 battalion anti-riot force trained to respond to sectarian violence.
- The Commando Battalion for Resolute Action (COBRA), a 10 battalion strong anti-Naxalite/COIN force.

=== Indo-Tibetan Border Police (ITBP) ===
The Indo-Tibetan Border Police is deployed for guarding duties on the Indo-China border from Karakoram Pass in Ladakh to Diphu Pass in Arunachal Pradesh covering a total distance of 3,488 km. It has more than 95000 personnel in 63 fighting battalions, 2 DM and 4 specialised battalions.

=== National Security Guard (NSG) ===
The National Security Guard (NSG), commonly known as Black Cats, is a counter-terrorism unit under the Ministry of Home Affairs. It was founded on 16 October 1984 under the National Security Guard Act, 1986. All personnel are deputed from other CAPFs and the Indian Army.

=== Sashastra Seema Bal (SSB) ===
The objective of the Sashastra Seema Bal (English: Armed Border Force) is to guard the Indo-Nepal and Indo-Bhutan borders. It has 76,337 personnel and 73 battalions, as well as some reserve battalions.

== Personnel ==
On 5 February 2019, the Supreme Court of India ruled that five CAPFs would be granted Non-Functional Financial Upgradation (NFFU), and the status of Organised Group ‘A’ Services (OGAS), ending a nearly decade-long battle for the central armed police. In the judgment by Rohinton Fali Nariman and M. R. Shah, the court said that officers from BSF, CRPF, SSB, ITBP, and CISF should be granted the NFFU and will be considered as Organised Group A Central Services.

In July 2019, the Central Cabinet granted Organised Group 'A' Service (OGAS) status to Group 'A' executive cadre officers of five Central Armed Police Forces (CAPF). It also extended the benefit of Non-Functional Financial Up-gradation(NFFU) and Non-Functional Selection Grade (NFSG) to the executive cadre officers at an enhanced rate of 30%.

However, the Ministry of Home Affairs (MHA) interpreted this judgment narrowly, clarifying that the OGAS status granted was for the limited purpose of extending the benefit of NFFU and NFSG to the eligible officers, and not for all purposes.

On 23 May 2025, the Supreme Court of India ruled that the Group 'A' Executive cadres of the five CAPFs are OGAS for all purposes, and that they cannot be granted one benefit and denied the other. In the judgment by Abhay S. Oka and Ujjal Bhuyan, the court held the view that the number of posts earmarked for deputation up to the level of the Senior Administrative Grade (SAG) in each of the five CAPFs should be progressively reduced within an outer limit of two years.

On 28 October 2025, the Supreme Court of India dismissed the review petition filed by the Ministry of Home Affairs against the judgment dated 23 May 2025.

As of 2026, the Ministry of Home Affairs continues to appoint Indian Police Service officers to senior positions up to the level of the Senior Administrative Grade (SAG) in the five CAPFs without notifying any amendment in the service rules/recruitment rules of the Group 'A' Executive cadres of the CAPFs or carrying out a cadre review in any of the CAPFs which was due in the year 2021.

On 02 April 2026, the Parliament passed the 'Central Armed Police Forces (General Administration) Bill, 2026' which received the President's assent on 09 April 2026 and was subsequently notified in the Gazette of India as the 'Central Armed Police Forces (General Administration) Act, 2026' on the same day, thereby effectively overturning the May 2025 judgment of the Supreme Court of India.

The Act empowers the Ministry of Home Affairs to frame rules providing for reservation of posts within the five CAPFs in the deputation of IPS officers at 50% at the Inspector-General (SAG) level, a minimum of 67% at the Additional Director-General level, and 100% at the Special Director-General and Director-General levels.

Though hailed by the Government and members of the ruling Bharatiya Janata Party to be an umbrella-law designed to minimise 'unnecessary litigation' by unifying the fragmented rules governing the conditions of service of the cadre officers of the five CAPFs, with a view towards harmonising judicial directions with administrative and federal requirements, this move effectively nullified the Organised Group 'A' Service status of the Group 'A' Executive cadre officers of the five CAPFs. It was met with widespread criticism by the Opposition, with the LoP (LS) Rahul Gandhi vowing to deliver complete justice to the cadre officers of the CAPFs if voted to power, and Members of Parliament Vivek Tankha of the INC and Mahua Moitra of the AITC pointing out the infirmities in the legislation, most notably a 'constitutionally impermissible' attempt to negate binding judicial directions by way of rules (secondary legislation), in addition to employing a non-obstante clause without removing the defects forming the substratum of the judgment and contrary to the spirit of multiple judgments of the Supreme Court, Union Cabinet's 2019 decision and recommendations of various Parliamentary Committees.

Several contempt petitions against the Union Home Secretary, Govind Mohan have been filed in the Supreme Court pending adjudication.

=== Recruitment ===
Recruitment of candidates to the CAPFs may be conducted by the Union Public Service Commission CAPF- AC exam, the Staff Selection Commission CPO exam, or the respective service HQs, depending on the post to be filled. The medical officers of the CAPFs, NSG, and AR are recruited via a common interview/personality test by the medical officers selection board (MOSB) constituted by the office of ADG(Medical), CAPFs, NSG, and AR. The allotment of the force to the officer in any above exams is based on the merit rank and preference list.

The Ministry of Home Affairs and the Staff Selection Commission of the Central Government of India allowed the recruitment examination of the CAPF be conducted in Assamese, Bengali, Gujarati, Marathi, Malayalam, Meitei (Manipuri), Kannada, Tamil, Telugu, Odia, Urdu, Punjabi, and Konkani, 13 of the 22 official languages of the Indian Republic, in addition to Hindi and English.

=== Rank structure ===
Officers

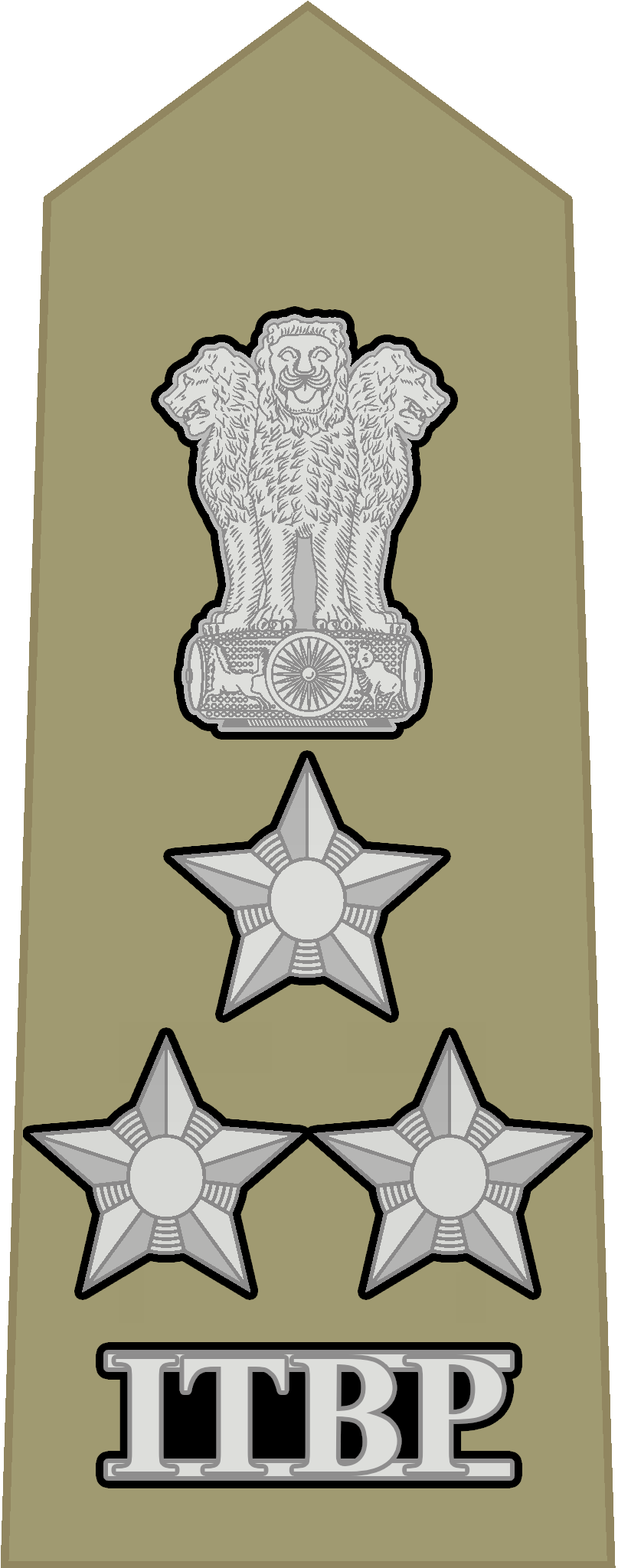
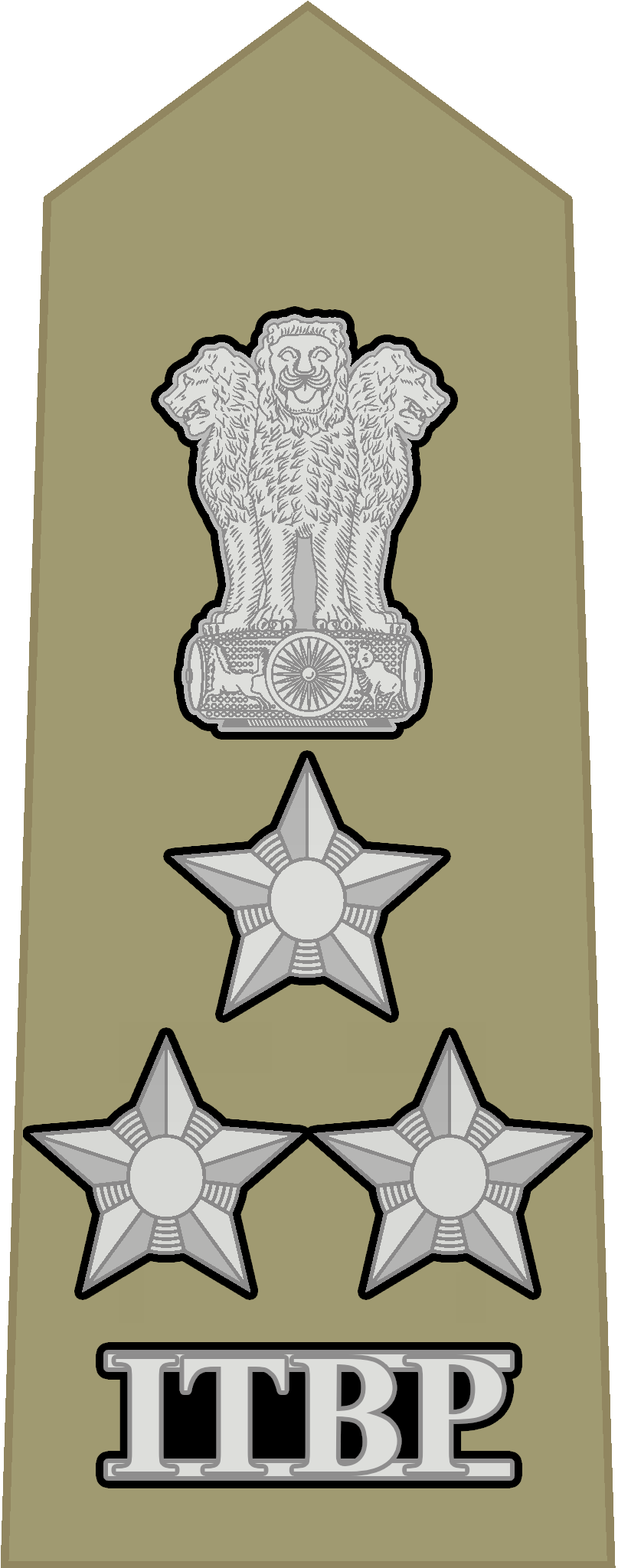
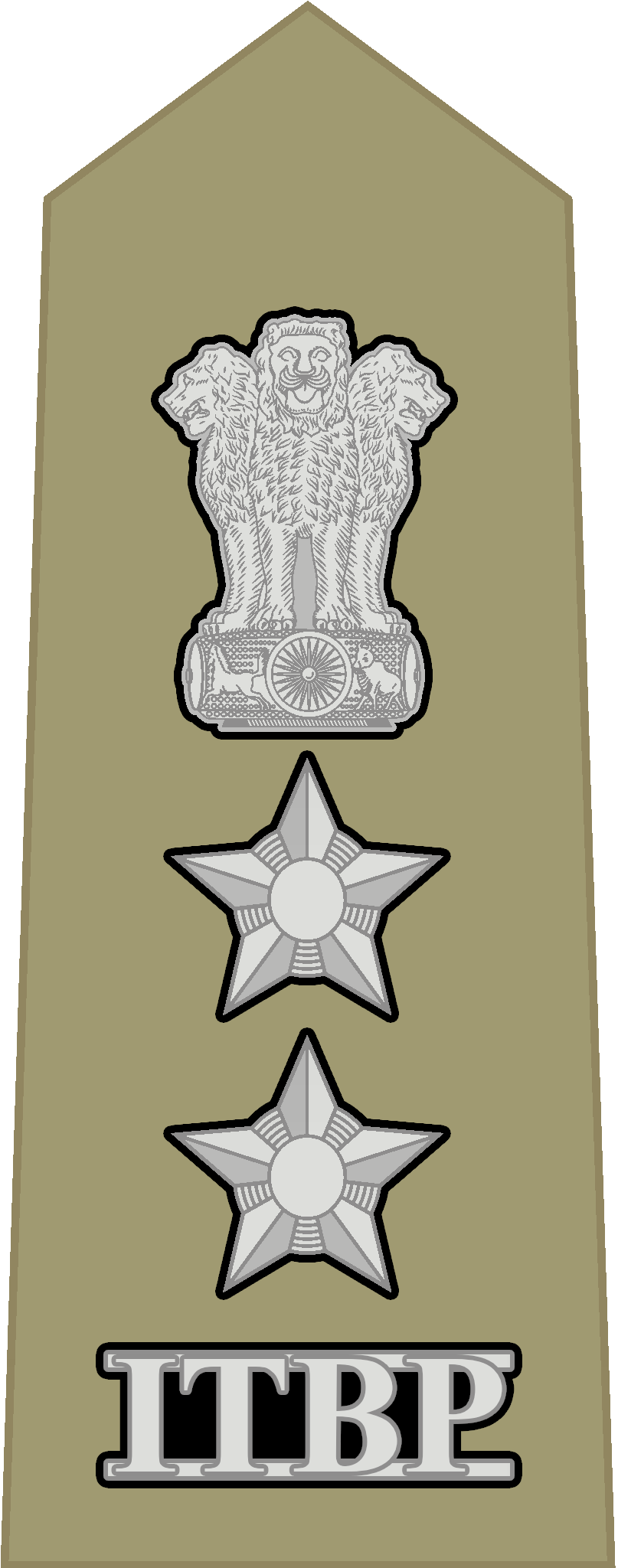
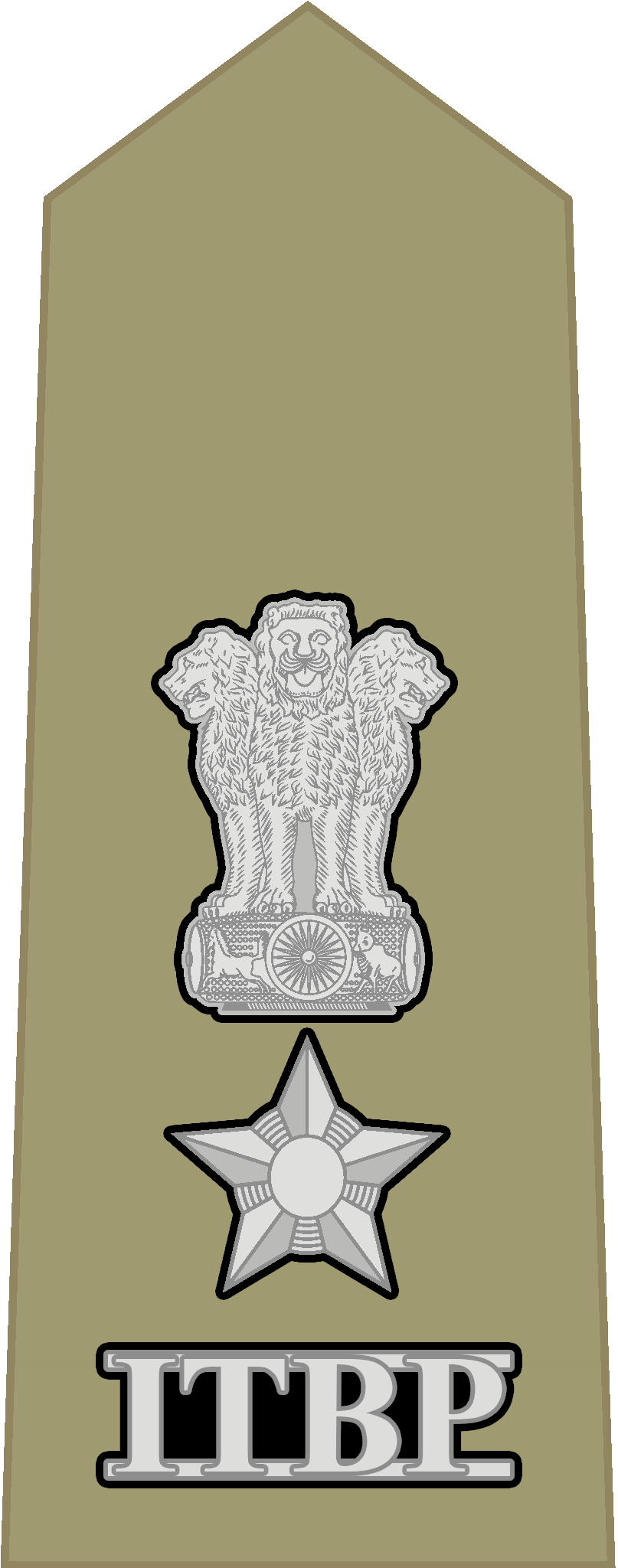
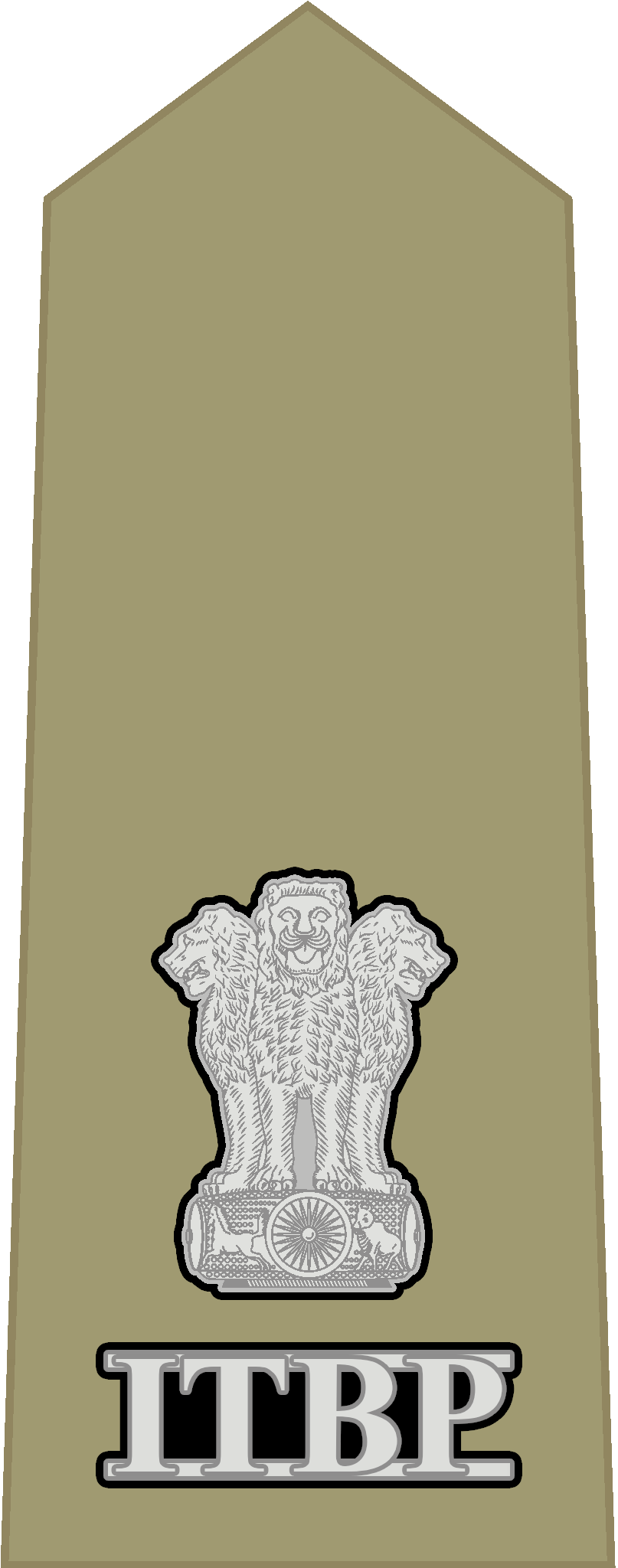
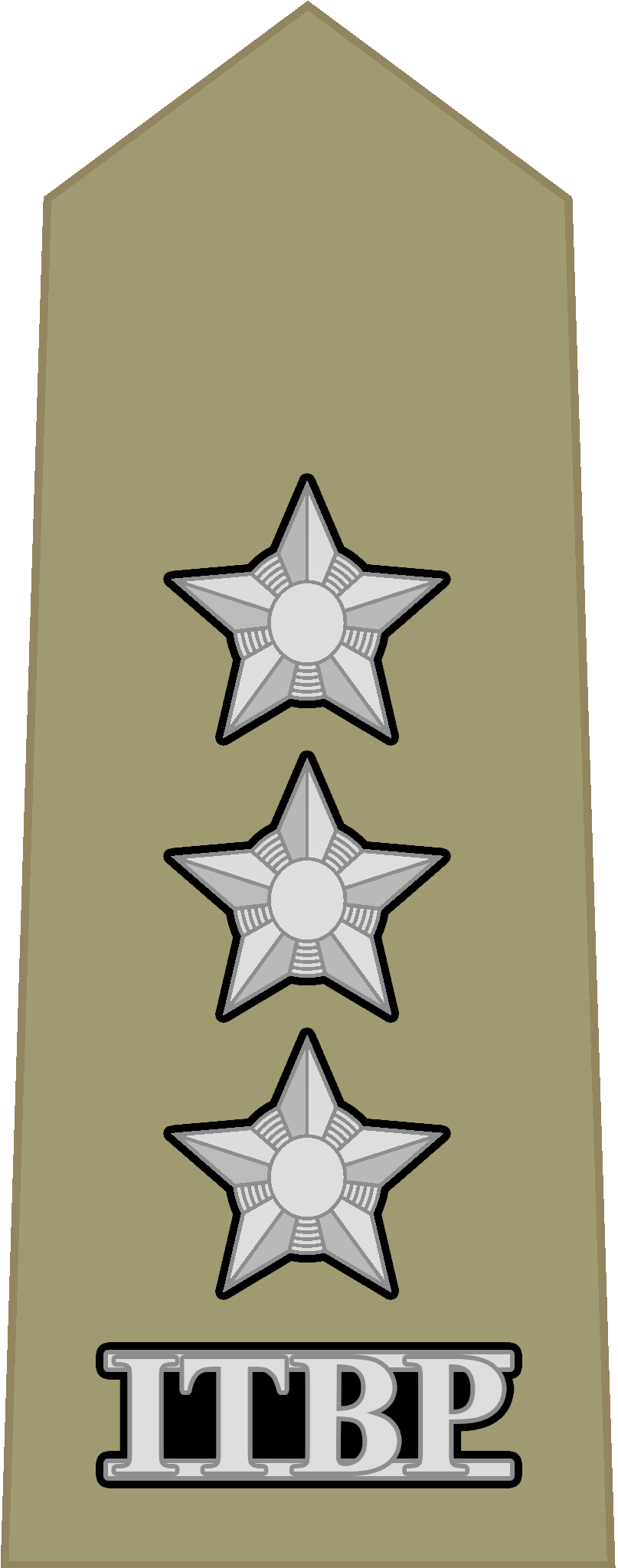
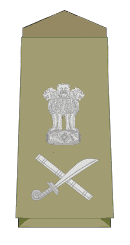
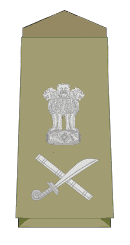
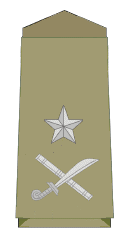
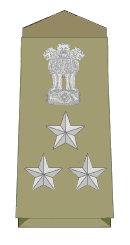
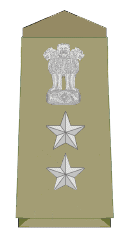
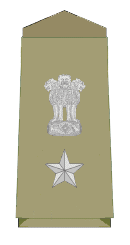
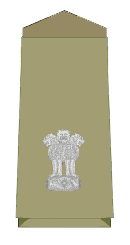
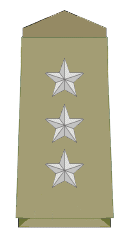
Rank group	General / flag officers					Senior officers			Junior officers
Assam Rifles	Director-general (Note: Equivalent to the rank lieutenant general (लेफ्टिनेंट - जनरल)) - / Special director-general (Note: Equivalent to the rank lieutenant general (लेफ्टिनेंट - जनरल)) - / Additional director-general (Note: Equivalent to the rank lieutenant general (लेफ्टिनेंट - जनरल)) -
Assam Rifles	Director-general - / Special director-general - / Additional director-general -		Inspector general (Note: Equivalent to the rank major general (मेजर - जनरल)) -	Deputy inspector-general (Note: Equivalent to the rank brigadier (ब्रिगेडियर)) -		Commandant (Note: Equivalent to the rank colonel (कर्नल)) -	Second-in-command (Note: Equivalent to the rank lieutenant colonel (लेफ्टिनेंट - कर्नल)) -	Deputy commandant (Note: Equivalent to the rank major (मेजर)) -	Assistant commandant (Note: Equivalent to the rank captain (कप्तान)) -
Border Security Force	Director-general - / Special director-general - / Additional director-general -
Border Security Force	Director-general - / Special director-general - / Additional director-general -		Inspector general -	Deputy inspector-general -		Commandant -	Second-in-command -	Deputy commandant -	Assistant commandant -
Central Industrial Security Force	Director-general - / Special director-general - / Additional director-general -
Central Industrial Security Force	Director-general - / Special director-general - / Additional director-general -		Inspector general -	Deputy inspector-general -		Senior commandant -	Commandant -	Deputy commandant -	Assistant commandant -
Central Reserve Police Force	Director-general - / Special director-general - / Additional director-general -
Central Reserve Police Force	Director-general - / Special director-general - / Additional director-general -		Inspector general -	Deputy inspector-general -		Commandant -	Second-in-command -	Deputy commandant -	Assistant commandant -
Indo-Tibetan Border Police
Indo-Tibetan Border Police	Director-general -	Additional director-general -	Inspector general -	Deputy inspector-general -	Additional deputy inspector-general -	Commandant -	Second-in-command -	Deputy commandant -	Assistant commandant -
National Security Guard
National Security Guard	Director general -	Additional director general -	Inspector general -	Deputy inspector general -		Group commander -	Second in command -	Squadron commander -	Team commander -
Sashastra Seema Bal
Sashastra Seema Bal	Director-general -	Additional director-general -	Inspector general -	Deputy inspector-general -		Commandant -	Second-in-command -	Deputy commandant -	Assistant commandant -
Police equivalent	Director General of Police / Director General / Additional; Director General		Inspector General	Deputy Inspector General		Senior Superintendent	Superintendent	Additional Superintendent	Deputy Superintendent	ACP/ASP
Rank group	General / flag officers					Senior officers			Junior officers

Personnel other than officers

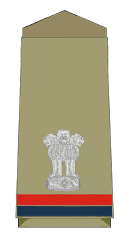
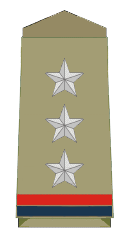
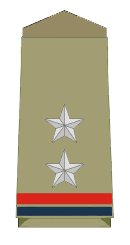
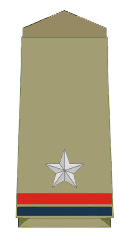
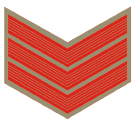
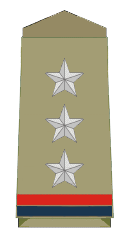
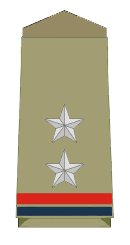
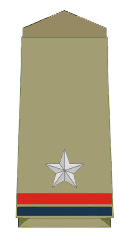
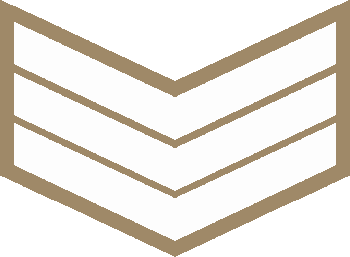
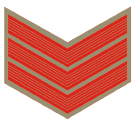
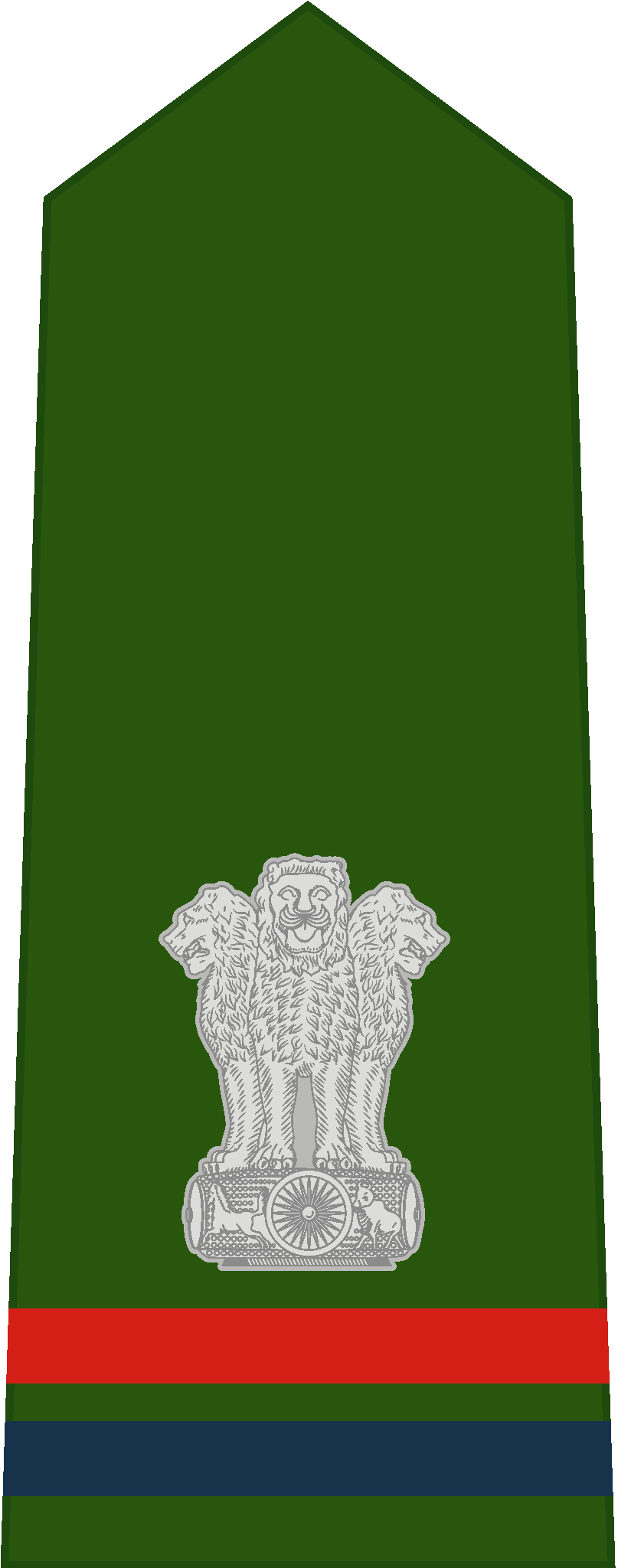
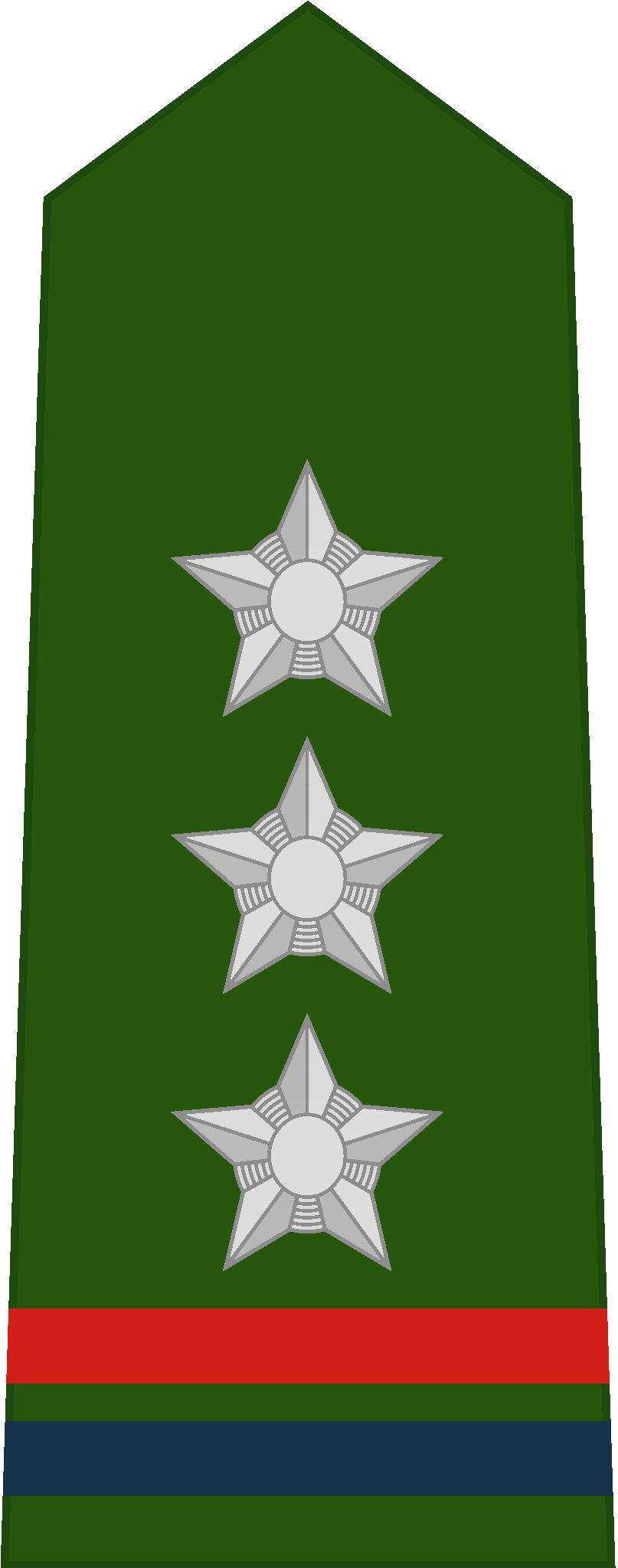
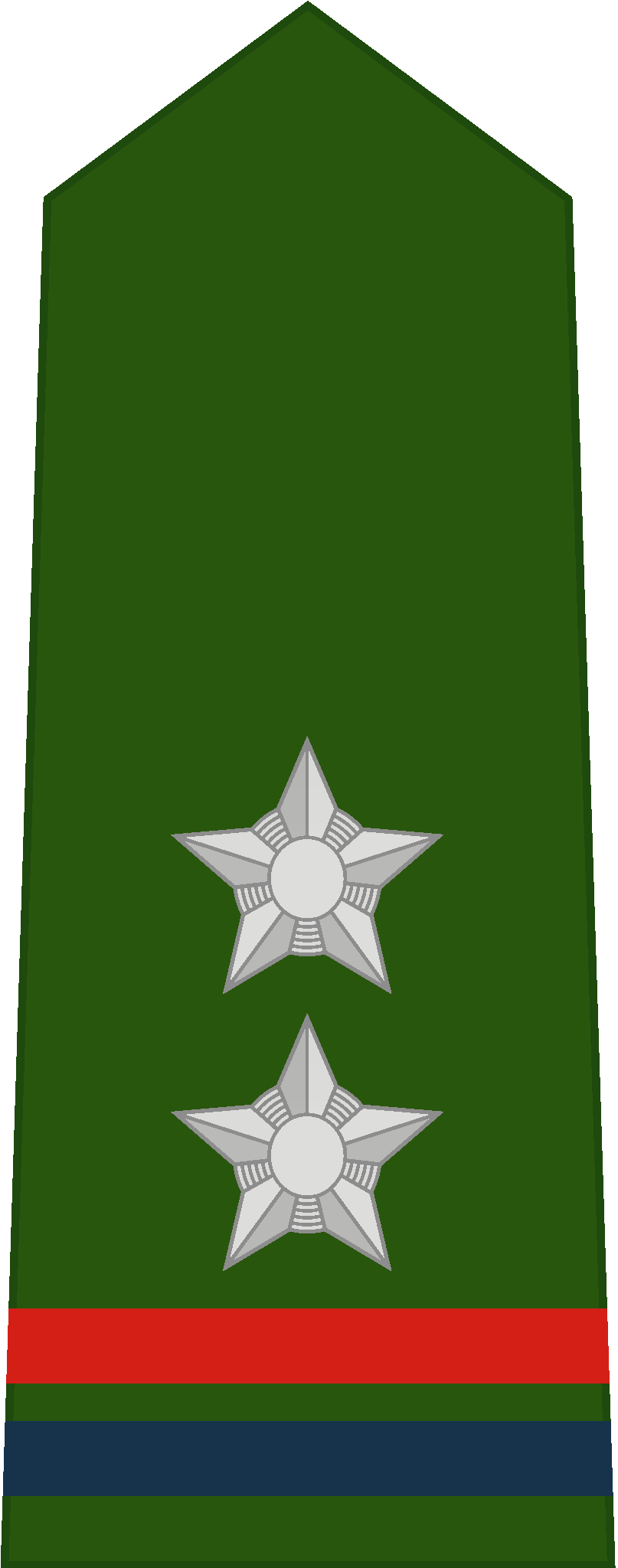
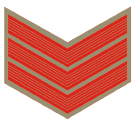
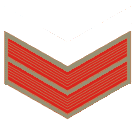
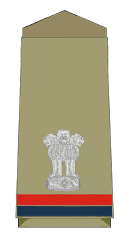
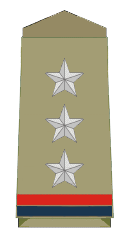
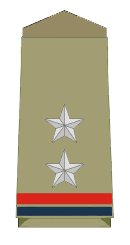
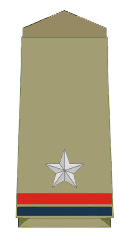
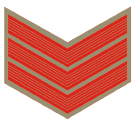
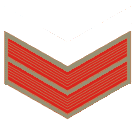
Rank group	Subordinate Officers (SO)				Non commissioned officers (NCO)				Enlisted
Assam Rifles									No insignia
Assam Rifles	Subedar major सूबेदार मेजर	Subedar सूबेदार		Naib subedar नायब सूबेदार	Warrant officer -	Havildar (Note: Equivalent to the rank head constable (-)) हवलदार			Rifleman (Note: Equivalent to the rank constable (-)) -
Border Security Force									No insignia
Border Security Force	Subedar major सूबेदार मेजर	Inspector निरीक्षक	Sub-inspector उप निरीक्षक	Assistant sub-inspector सहायक उप निरीक्षक	Head constable हवलदार				Constable कनिष्ठबल
Central Industrial Security Force									No insignia
Central Industrial Security Force		Inspector निरीक्षक	Sub inspector उप निरीक्षक	Assistant sub-inspector सहायक उप निरीक्षक	Head constable हवलदार				Constable कनिष्ठबल
Central Reserve Police Force									No insignia
Central Reserve Police Force	Subedar major सूबेदार मेजर	Inspector निरीक्षक	Sub-inspector उप निरीक्षक	Assistant sub-inspector सहायक उप निरीक्षक	Head constable हवलदार				Constable कनिष्ठबल
Indo-Tibetan Border Police									No insignia
Indo-Tibetan Border Police	Subedar major सूबेदार मेजर	Subedar/Inspector सूबेदार/निरीक्षक	Sub inspector उप निरीक्षक		Head constable हवलदार		Naik नायक	Lance naik लांस नायक	Constable कनिष्ठबल
National Security Guard									No insignia
National Security Guard	Subedar major सूबेदार मेजर	Assistant commander-1 -	Assistant commander-2 -	Assistant commander-3 -	Ranger grade I -		Ranger grade II -		Combatised tradesmen -
Sashastra Seema Bal									No insignia
Sashastra Seema Bal	Subedar major सूबेदार मेजर	Inspector निरीक्षक	Sub inspector उप निरीक्षक	Assistant sub-inspector सहायक उप निरीक्षक	Head constable हवलदार		Naik नायक	Lance naik लांस नायक	Constable कनिष्ठबल
Rank group	Subordinate Officers (SO)				Non commissioned officers (NCO)				Enlisted

Officers

Officers in CAPFs are recruited through the Central Armed Police Forces (Assistant Commandants) Examination conducted by UPSC. They are appointed as Assistant Commandants and are Gazetted Officers generally referred to as DAGOs (Directly Appointed Gazetted Officers) in CRPF, AC (Direct Entry) in BSF. DEGOs (Departmental Entry Gazetted Officers) are those officers who have been promoted through departmental exams conducted internally for Subordinate Officers. They are known as encounter specialists among the police forces of India.

Enlisted ranks

Sub Inspectors are recruited through a competitive examination conducted by the Staff Selection Commission, and they are referred to as DASOs (Directly Appointed Subordinate Officers). DESOs (Departmental Entry Subordinate Officers) are those officers who have been promoted through departmental exams conducted internally for Constables, Head Constables, and Assistant Sub Inspectors. Constables are recruited through a competitive examination conducted by Staff Selection Commission. Apart from the above modes, CAPFs conduct recruitment for specialized posts such as Engineers, Doctors, etc., among DAGOs and Wireless operators, Technicians, Nursing Staff, etc., among subordinate officers and constables directly under their own authority (MHA).

=== Women in CAPF ===
Women were not recruited for the Central Armed Police Forces until 1992. Earlier, the role of women was limited to supervisory roles. The Parliamentary Committees of India for women's empowerment recommended expanding women's roles in CAPF. The Ministry of Home Affairs declared reservation for women in constabulary, and later declared that they can also be inducted as officers in combat roles in five CAPFs. The Central Home Minister announced that women's representation in the CRPF and CISF would be made 15 percent while it would be 5 percent in the BSF, ITBP and SSB. In 2016, it was decided that 33 percent of posts at the constabulary level would be reserved for women in the CRPF and the CISF, and 14-15 percent of posts at the constable level in the BSF, SSB and ITBP in a phased manner.

== See also ==
- State Armed Police Forces
- Paramilitary forces of India
- Law enforcement in India
- Indian Armed Forces
- People's Armed Police - A similar agency in China
