= Neelamani Raju =

Indian police officer

Neelamani N Raju is an Indian Police Service officer of 1983 batch (Karnataka Cadre). She was the Director General and Inspector General (DG&IG) of police, Karnataka. Ms Raju is the first female police officer to head the Karnataka police force. She retired from her post on 31 January 2020.

She has served the Government of India on Central deputation for over 20 years. She also served as a secretary in the embassy of India in Kathmandu, Nepal. Before returning to her state cadre in 2016, she was Additional Director at Intelligence Bureau, Ministry of Home Affairs, Government of India.
