= Barasat killings of 1970 =

Killing of 11 men in West Bengal, India

The Barasat killings of 1970 refer to the killing of 11 young men on the night of 19 November 1970 in Barasat, a suburb of Kolkata in West Bengal, India.

== Incident ==
The men had been rounded up from a secret meeting at the Maidan in Kolkata by the West Bengal police force. Autopsy reports later showed that the bullets were fired from service revolvers, directly implicating the police in the killings. The Barasat killings were part of a ferocious government crackdown on suspected Naxalite rebels, taking place in the context of widespread political violence that plagued West Bengal province at the time under President's Rule. The incident was swiftly followed by the killing of another four or five activists in Beliaghata, Kolkata. Most reports later blamed a secret 'death squad operated by the Police Special Branch, implicating a DCP Bibhuti Bhusan Chakraborty, DCP Debi Roy, DCP A.R. Mukherjee, ACP James Henderson, ACP Runu Guha Niyogi, Inspector (Mounted) Richard Munro, Inspector Somendranath Bose, Inspector Bikram Mitter, Sergeant William Hodgson, Sergeant Dipak Banerjee, SI Chitta Ganguly, SI Anil Maitra, Ar. ASI Amalendu Ghosh, Naib Risaldar Shambhu Singh Shahi, Ar. ASI Rameshwar Pandey, Ar. ASI Gabru Thapa, Head Constable Bindeyeshwari Singh, Head Constable Bipin Roy Burman, Head Constable Banke Ram Dubey, Head Constable Amiya Ghosh, Head Constable Ram Persad Missir, Constable Bishambher Nath Tiwari, Constable Enamul Haq Molla, Constable Subrata Konar, Constable Ram Babu Singh, Constable Shew Persad Pandey, Constable Soumitra Ghosh, Constable Binoy Murmu, Constable Tarapada Bagdi, Constable Nazrul Islam, Constable Sukumar Biswas, Constable Subhash Mukherjee, Constable Gangeswar Pandey, Constable Mofijur Rahman and Constable Baidyanath Banerjee as part of a Special Branch encounter cell. There were also reports of an Inspector of the Central Intelligence Bureau and a Deputy Commandant of the CRPF being involved with the encounter cell

== Popular culture ==
The Bengali poet and novelist Nabarun Bhattacharya refers to the killings, giving the names of some of the dead, in his award-winning novel Harbart .
