= August 15 (disambiguation) =

August 15 is the 227th day of the year (228th in leap years) in the Gregorian calendar.

August 15 may also refer to:

- August 15 (Eastern Orthodox liturgics)
- National Liberation Day of Korea, public holiday celebrated in North and South Korea on 15 August.
- Independence Day (India), public holiday celebrated on 15 August
  - 15th August (1993 film), an Indian Hindi-language film
  - August 15 (2011 film), an Indian crime thriller film
  - 15 August (2019 film), an Indian Marathi-language drama film
- 15 August (2001 film) or 15 Août, a French film
- August 15th (2008 film), a Chinese short film

== See also ==
- Indian independence (disambiguation)
