= Assistant commandant =

Military and paramilitary rank

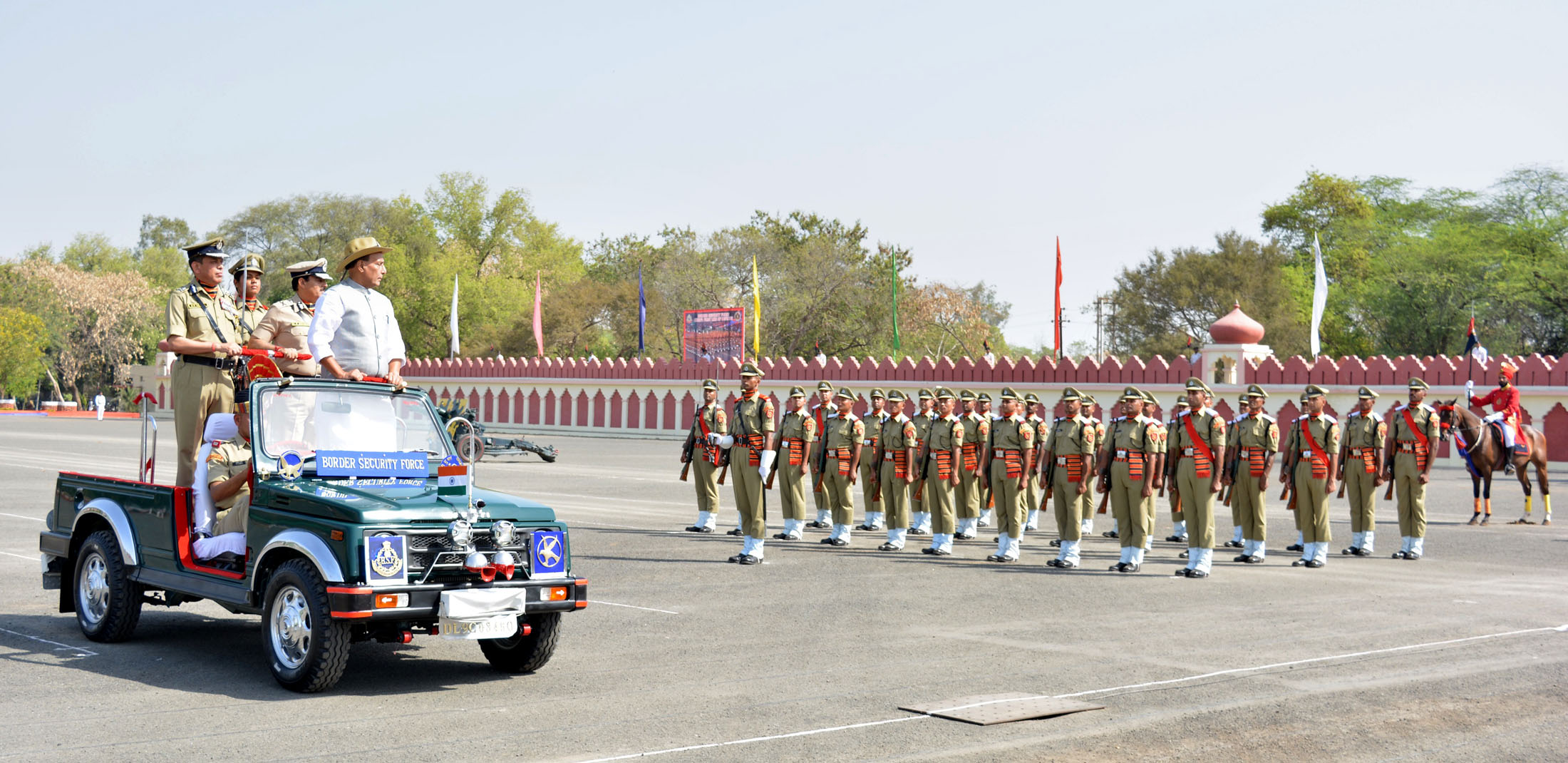
Passing Out Parade of Direct Entry Assistant Commandants of Border Security Force.

Assistant Commandant is a title often given to the second-in-command of a military, uniformed service, armed police battalion, training establishment or academy. This usage is common in English-speaking nations, and in some countries it may be a military or police rank.

Rank insignia of Assistant Commandant

In India, assistant commandant as a rank was envisaged by General J. N. Chaudhuri, who was part of the committee studying the need for a dedicated Border Guarding force raised on military lines to guard the perilous India-Pakistan border given the UN conventions deriding and preventing military formations or build-up on the borders between the two un-friendly neighbors. General J. N. Chaudhuri recommended to raise the officer cadre of the Border Security Force on lines of the military hierarchy and hence assistant commandant, which otherwise is an appointment in most countries, came up as the junior-most rank in the hierarchy of Gazetted officers of the Border Security Force.

The rank of Assistant Commandant is used in both the Central Armed Police Forces (CAPFs) and various State Armed Police Forces in India. In the hierarchy of an armed police battalion, an Assistant Commandant typically serves as the third-in-command, subordinate to the Commandant and Deputy Commandant.

For its exclusivity and unique hierarchical association with Indian Paramilitary Forces of India, assistant commandant, for comparative understanding, is equivalent to the ranks of assistant commissioner of police (ACP), deputy superintendent of police (DSP), and captain in the Indian Army. This rank is the highest entry level rank in the Central Armed Police Forces of India. It is also use in various State Armed Police Forces.

Assistant commandants in Central Armed Police Forces (CAPF) are selected through a competitive exam conducted by Union Public Service Commission (UPSC) annually.

Assistant commandants are mandated to command companies and Direct Action Teams (DATs) in various CAPFs and law enforcement agencies, They are also sent on deputations to various organizations such as RAW, NSG, SPG, NIA, IB, CBI, NDRF, NCB, State Armed Police Forces (SAPFs) (DRG, Jharkhand Jaguars, Bihar military police, IRB, UP/MP STFs, etc.).

CAPFs ranks	Police ranks	Army ranks	Navy ranks	Air Force ranks	Coast Guard ranks	Intelligence Bureau Ranks
Director general (Apex Scale)	Director general of State Police Force	Lieutenant general (Commander's Scale)	Vice admiral (Commander's Scale)	Air marshal (Commander's Scale)	Director general	Special Director
Additional director general (ADG)	Additional director general (ADG)	Lieutenant general (HAG)	Vice admiral (HAG)	Air marshal (HAG)	Additional director general	Additional Director
Inspector general (IG)	Inspector general (IG)	Major general	Rear admiral	Air vice marshal	Inspector general	Joint Director
Deputy inspector general (DIG)	Deputy inspector general (DIG)	Brigadier	Commodore	Air commodore	Deputy inspector general (3-year seniority)	Deputy Director
Commandant	Senior Superintendent of Police (SSP)	Colonel	Captain	Group captain	Commandant	Additional Deputy Director/Joint Deputy Director
Second-in-Command	Superintendent of Police (SP) / Deputy Commissioner of Police (DCP)	Lieutenant colonel	Commander	Wing commander	Commandant (Junior Grade)	Assistant Director
Deputy commandant	Additional Superintendent of Police	Major	Lieutenant commander	Squadron leader	Deputy commandant	Deputy Central Intelligence Officer
Assistant commandant	Deputy Superintendent of Police (DSP) / Assistant Commissioner of Police (ACP)	Captain	Lieutenant	Flight lieutenant	Assistant commandant	Assistant Central Intelligence Officer - I
Assistant commandant (Officer Trainee)	Assistant Superintendent of Police (ASP)	Lieutenant	Sub-lieutenant	Flying officer	Assistant commandant (under probation)	Assistant Central Intelligence officer -II

== Pay scale of assistant commandants in CAPFs ==
Rank	Pay Scale	Pay Band
Director-General	INR 2,25,000	Apex Fixed
Additional Director General	INR 1,82,200 to INR 2,24,100	HAG
Inspector General	INR 1,44,000 to INR 2,18,000	Pay Band 4
Deputy Inspector General	INR 1,31,000 - INR 2,15,900	Pay Band 4
Commandant	INR 1,31,000 - INR 2,15,986.	Pay Band 4
Second-in-Command	INR 78,800 - INR 2,09,200	Pay Band 3
Deputy Commandant	INR 67,700 - INR 2,08,870	Pay Band 3
Assistant Commandant	INR 56,100 - 1,77,500	Pay Band 3

== Subordinate officers (SOs) ==
Sub-inspectors are recruited through competitive examination conducted by Staff Selection Commission and they are referred to as DASOs (directly appointed subordinate officers). DESOs (departmental entry subordinate officers) are those officers who have been promoted through departmental exams conducted internally for inspectors, sub-inspectors, assistant sub-inspectors, head constables, constables etc.

== Promotional avenues for Gazetted officers ==
After joining service as assistant commandant the following promotional avenues are available to cadre officers:-

Rank	Qualifying service for promotion
Dy. Commandant.	5 years as Asstt. Commandnat.
Second-In-Command	5 years as Dy.Commandant (with total 10 years Group ‘A’ service).
Commandant	5 years as Second-In-Command (with 15 years Group ‘A’ service)
DIG	3 years as Commandant (with 20 years Group ‘A’ service)
IG	3 years as DIG (24 years Group ‘A’ service)
ADG	30 years of Group 'A' service.

== United States ==
In the United States, assistant commandant is an appointment, not a rank. A common use of the term is for the position of assistant commandant of the Marine Corps. Appointments to this position are held by officers with the rank of general. Officers who hold this appointment are the second highest ranking officers in the United States Marine Corps after the commandant of the Marine Corps
