= Indian independence =

Indian independence may refer to:

- Indian independence movement, movement to end British rule in India
  - List of Indian independence activists
  - Revolutionary movement for Indian independence, violent factions of the Indian independence movement
  - Indian independence movement in Tamil Nadu, the movement in the present-day Tamil Nadu state of India
  - Indian Independence League, an Indian nationalist political organisation in Japanese occupied Southeast Asia
  - Indian Independence Committee or Berlin Committee, Indian independence organization and conspiracy circle in Germany during World War I (see Hindu–German Conspiracy)
  - Indian Independence Act 1947, an act of the Parliament of the United Kingdom that granted de facto independence to India and Pakistan
    - Partition of India, the split of British India into modern India and Pakistan
    - Independence Day (India), India's national day and public holiday on August 15 marking independence from the British Empire
      - Indian Independence Day parade
        - Indian Independence Day parade in New York City
    - Indian Independence Medal, an Indian military award
- Native American self-determination, including independence movements among American Indians

== See also ==
- August 15 (disambiguation)
