= Deputy Commandant =

Military and paramilitary rank

Rank insignia of Deputy Commandant In India

Deputy Commandant is a Group A Gazetted Officer rank in the Central Armed Police Forces (CAPF), State Armed Police Forces and Indian Coast Guard. This rank is equivalent to the rank of District Superintendent of Police and in the Indian Army to that of Major .

it is also a title/alpointment given to the officer in charge or chief instructor of a military (or other uniformed service) training establishment or academy. This usage is common in English-speaking nations. This rank is also in use in state armed police forces of India.

== Deputy Commandant (DC) in CAPF ==
Deputy Commandant in CAPF has varied job profile. They are either posted as Adjutant of the battalion or command service companies. Deputy Commandants who have completed their staff courses are also posted as "staff officer" to senior officers at sector and frontier HQs. If a Deputy Commandant is posted as a head of a unit, then he/she will discharge all the duties of a Commandant and will exercise only those financial powers that are delegated to him under the relevant rules.

=== Comparative Ranks To Deputy Commandant (DC) In CAPF ===
CAPFs ranks	Police ranks	Army ranks	Navy ranks	Air Force ranks	Coast Guard ranks
Director general (Apex Scale)	Director general of State Police Force	Lieutenant general (Commander's Scale)	Vice admiral (Commander's Scale)	Air marshal (Commander's Scale)	Director general
Additional director general (ADG)	Additional director general (ADG)	Lieutenant general (HAG)	Vice admiral (HAG)	Air marshal (HAG)	Additional director general
Inspector general (IG)	Inspector general (IG)	Major general	Rear admiral	Air vice marshal	Inspector general
Deputy inspector general (DIG)	Deputy inspector general (DIG)	Brigadier	Commodore	Air commodore	Deputy inspector general (3-year seniority)
Commandant	Senior Superintendent of Police (SSP)	Colonel	Captain	Group captain	Deputy inspector general
Second-in-Command	Superintendent of Police (SP)	Lieutenant colonel	Commander	Wing commander	Commandant
Deputy commandant	Additional Deputy Commissioner of Police/Additional Superintendent of Police	Major	Lieutenant commander	Squadron leader	Deputy commandant
Assistant commandant	Deputy Superintendent of Police (DSP)	Captain	Lieutenant	Flight lieutenant	Assistant commandant
Assistant commandant (Officer Trainee)		Lieutenant	Sub-lieutenant	Flying officer	Assistant commandant (under probation)

=== Promotional Avenues for Gazetted Officers in CAPF ===
After joining the service as Assistant commandant and completing 5 years of service successfully the next promotion is to the rank of Deputy commandant.

Rank	Qualifying service for Promotion.
Dy. Commandant.	5 years as Asstt. Commandnat.
Second-In-Command	5 years as Dy.Commandant (with total 10 years Group ‘A’ service).
Commandant	5 years as Second-In-Command (with 15 years Group ‘A’ service)
DIGP	3 years as Commandant (with 20 years Group ‘A’ service)
IGP	3 years as DIG (24 years Group ‘A’ service)

=== Pay Scale of Deputy commandant CAPF ===
The basic pay of deputy commandant is INR 67,700 falls under Pay Band 3.

Rank	Pay Scale	Pay Band
Director-General	INR 2,25,000	Apex Fixed
Additional Director General	INR 1,82,200 to INR 2,24,100	HAG
Inspector General	INR 1,44,000 to INR 2,18,000	Pay Band 4
Deputy Inspector General	INR 1,31,000 - INR 2,15,900	Pay Band 4
Sr. Commandant	INR 1,31,000 - INR 2,15, 900.	Pay Band 4
Commandant	INR 78,800 - INR 2,09,200	Pay Band 3
Deputy Commandant	INR 67,700 - INR 2,08,700	Pay Band 3
Assistant Commandant	INR 56,100 - 1,77,500	Pay Band 3

== See also ==
- Border Security Force
- Central Industrial Security Force
- Central Reserve Police Force
- Indo-Tibetan Border Police
- Sashastra Seema Bal
