= Special director general of police =

Special Director General of Police
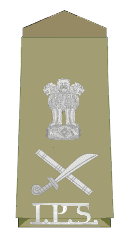
- Shoulder Rank of SDGP

Special Director General of Police (SDGP) is an Indian Police Service rank. Having the maximum possible 3-star police rank just like Director General of Police, SDGP's are considered equivalent to DGP's. The equivalent position or designation are Commissioner of Police of some cities like Kolkata, Chennai special or additional secretary. The insignia of an SDG is the national emblem over a crossed sword and baton. SDG-ranked officers wear Gorget patches on their collar, which have a dark blue background with an oak leaf pattern stitched on it, similar to IGs and ADGs. SDGs are posted as heads of various bureaus similar to ADGs. The rank above it is Director General of Police and the rank below it is Additional Director General of Police.
