= Additional director general of police =

Indian Police Service rank

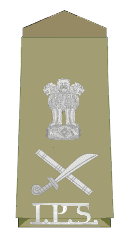
- Rank Insignia

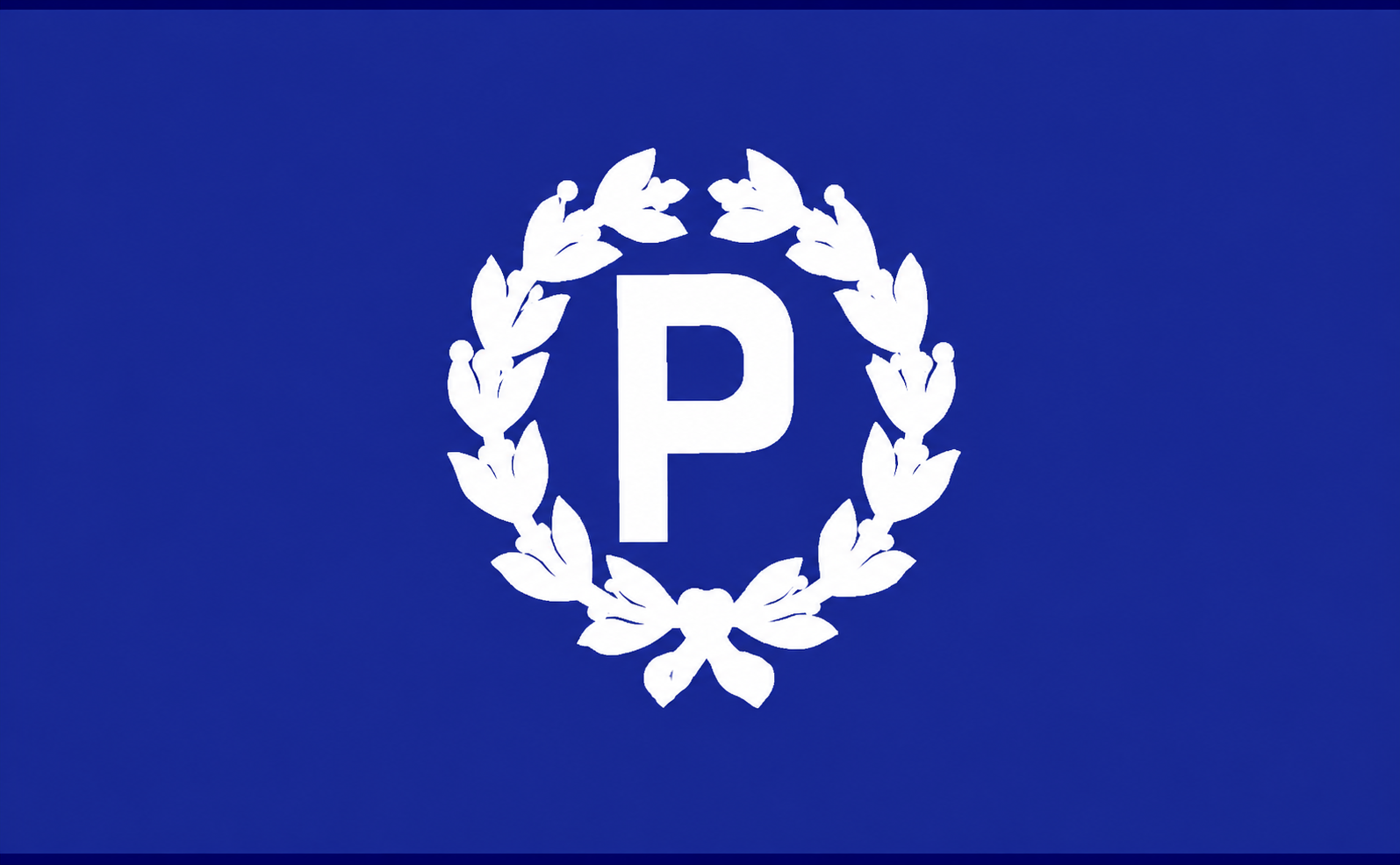
- Flag for Police Vehicle

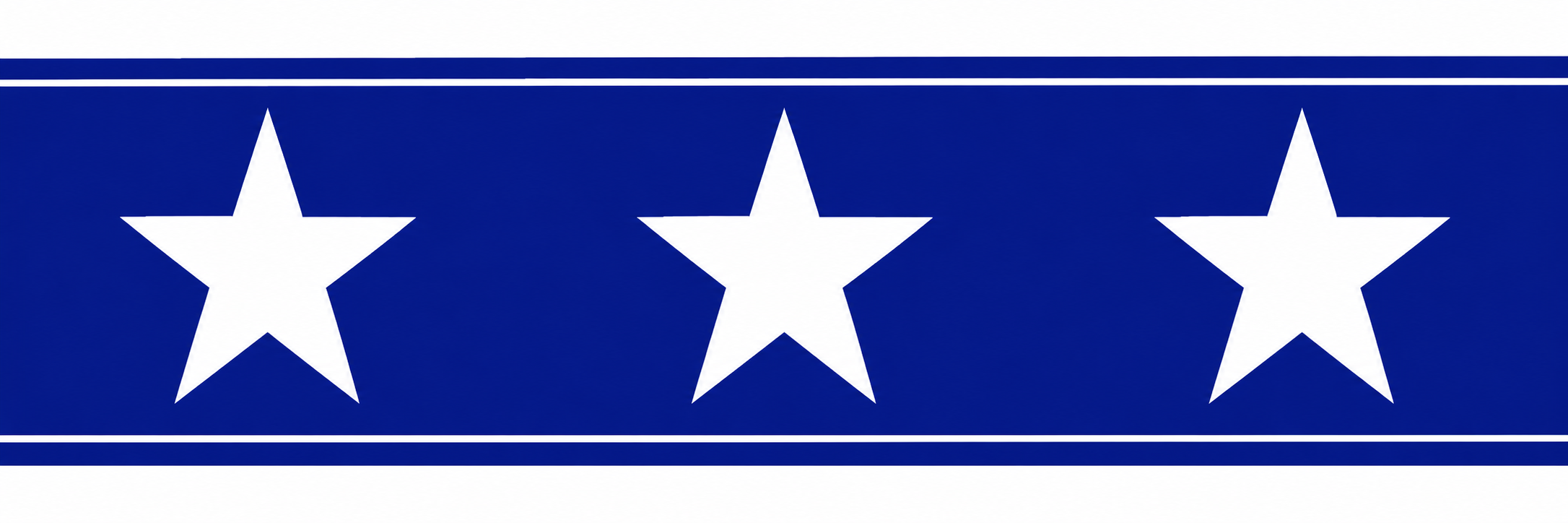
- Star Plate for Police Vehicle
- Service branch: Indian Police Service
- Abbreviation: Addl.DGP
- Pay grade: Level 15 (HAG)
- Next higher rank: Director general of police (DGP)
- Next lower rank: Inspector-general of police (IGP)

The Additional Director General of Police (Addl. DGP) is a senior rank in the Indian Police Service (IPS). It is the second-highest rank in the state police forces of India, below the Director General of Police (DGP) and above the Inspector General of Police (IGP). Addl.DGPs are responsible for overseeing various aspects of police administration, including law and order, investigations, intelligence, training, and modernization.

== Appointments ==
The appointment of Additional Director General of Police (Addl. DGP) in India is governed by state laws and regulations. The process typically involves promotion from lower ranks within the Indian Police Service (IPS) or, in some cases, deputation from other services.

=== Eligibility and Selection ===
To be eligible for appointment as an ADGP, an officer must typically:

- Be an IPS officer with a minimum of 25 years of service
- Have a proven track record of leadership and administrative skills
- Be empaneled by the Union Public Service Commission (UPSC) for holding Additional Director General level posts

The selection process often involves:

- Evaluation of the officer's service record
- Assessment of their performance in previous roles
- Consideration of their potential for higher responsibilities

=== Appointment Process ===
The appointment of ADGPs is typically made by the state government. According to Section 5 of the Police Act in some states:

The State Government may appoint one or more Additional Director Generals, Inspector Generals, Deputy and Assistant Inspector Generals of Police as necessary.

The exact number of ADGP positions can vary by state, depending on the size and needs of the police force. For example, as of January 2024, the Punjab Police had 28 officers at the ADGP rank.

=== Roles and Responsibilities ===
ADGPs are typically assigned to oversee specific aspects of policing or geographical zones within the state. Common responsibilities include:

- Law and order management
- Criminal investigations
- Intelligence gathering
- Training and development of police personnel
- Modernization of police forces
- Administrative functions

The exact duties may vary depending on the specific posting and the needs of the state police force.
