= Surjeet Singh Deswal =

Indian Police Service (IPS) officer

Director General of Indo-Tibetan Border Police
- In office 31 October 2018 – 31 August 2021
- Preceded by: R K Pachnanda
- Succeeded by: Sanjay Arora (officer)

Director General of Sashastra Seema Bal
- In office 1 September 2018 – 30 October 2018
- Preceded by: Rajni Kant Mishra
- Succeeded by: Kumar Rajesh Chandra

Personal details
- Born: 6 August 1961 (age 65) Atawala, Panipat, Haryana
- Education: Kurukshetra University and Sainik School Kunjpura, Karnal
- Awards: President's Police Medal for Distinguished Service; Police Medal for Meritorious Service
- Police career
- Department: Haryana Police, Haryana Armed Police, Central Bureau of Investigation, Sashastra Seema Bal, Indo-Tibetan Border Police, Border Security Force
- Service years: 1984–2021
- Rank: Director General of Police

Surjeet Singh Deswal also known as S S Deswal is an Indian Police Service officer of 1984 batch, who worked as the Director General of Indo-Tibetan Border Police (ITBP) and retired from same post on 31 August 2021 the India's primary border guarding organization ofIndo-China International Borders, since his appointment on 31 October 2018 with additional charge of Border Security Force. He is a 1984 batch IPS officer of Haryana cadre. He previously served as the Director General of Sashastra Seema Bal (SSB).

== Education and career ==
He did his graduation in Bachelor of Science from Panipat. He holds a Bachelor of Laws (LLB) degree from Kurukshetra University. He is an IPS officer of 1984 batch, Haryana cadre.

He has served as the Commissioner of Police of Gurgaon for 4 years and led the Haryana Armed Police between 12 December 2014 and 20 November 2015, as Director General. He joined the Central Bureau of Investigation (CBI) in 1994 and served as its Superintendent of Police till 1998. In December 2015, he was appointed as Additional Director General (ADG) in the Sashastra Seema Bal (SSB) and served as ADG till October 2017. In September 2018, he was made Director General of SSB, succeeding Rajni Kant Mishra.

On 31 October 2018, he was appointed as the Director General of Indo-Tibetan Border Police (ITBP). Deswal also received the additional charge of DG of Central Reserve Police Force (CRPF) in January 2020. In March 2020, he was given the additional charge of the Director General of Border Security Force (BSF). In September 2020 SS Deswal was given the additional charge of NSG. Thereafter, he served as Vice-Chancellor of Sports University of Haryana from 1 December 2022 to 20 February 2024.

== Awards and decorations ==
In 2001, Deswal was conferred with the Indian Police Medal for Meritorious Service. He received the President's Police Medal for Distinguished Service in 2012.

Police Medal	President's Police Medal
