= Shatrujeet Singh Kapoor =

Indian Police Service Officer

Director General of Indo-Tibetan Border Police
- In office 15 January 2026 – 31 October 2026
- Preceded by: Praveen Kumar

Personal details
- Born: 21 October 1966 (age 60) Jind, Haryana, India
- Education: B.Tech in Mechanical Engineering, National Institute of Technology, Kurukshetra
- Occupation: IPS officer
- Profession: Civil servant
- Awards: Indian Police Medal awarded by the central government for Meritorious Service President's Police Medal for Distinguished Service

Shatrujeet Singh Kapoor (born 21 October 1966) is a retired 1990-batch Indian Police Service (IPS) officer from Haryana Cadre who served as the Director General of Indo-Tibetan Border Police from 15 January 2026 till 31 October 2026. He served as the former Director General of Police, Haryana.

== Early life and education ==
Kapoor was born on 21 October 1966 in Jind, Haryana, India and Kapoor, who hails from Phagwara in Punjab, He completed his B.Tech in Mechanical Engineering from the National Institute of Technology, Kurukshetra.

== Career ==
From 15 January 2026, he served as the Director General of Indo-Tibetan Border Police till 31 October 2026 and previously served as the Director general of police of Haryana from 16 August 2023 till 14 October 2025. Also, he served as Chief of the Anti-Corruption Bureau (ACB).
