= Nitin Agarwal (civil servant) =

31st Director General of the Border Security Force (born 1966)

Nitin Agrawal
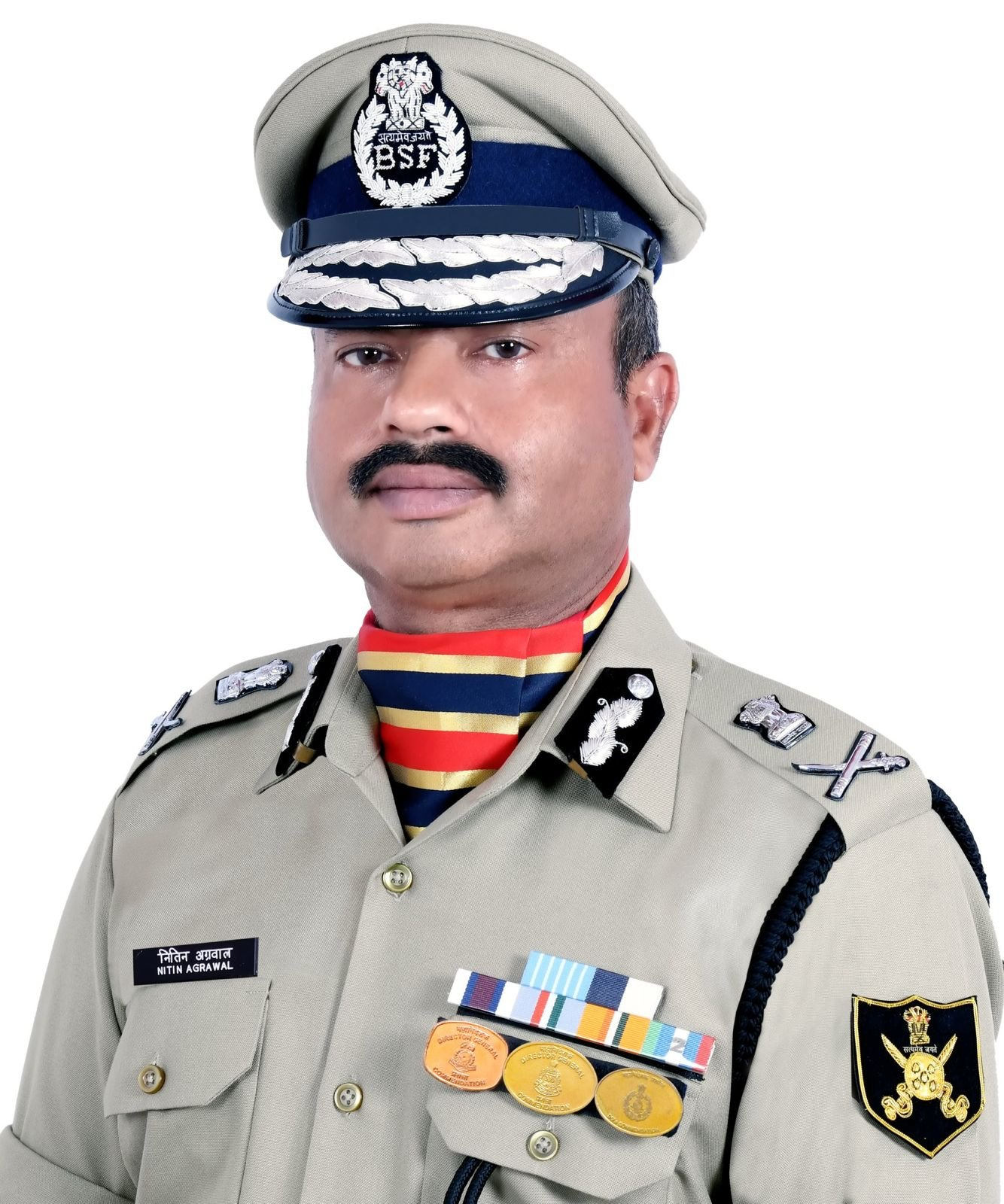
- Sh Nitin Agrawal, IPS

Director General of Kerala Fire and Rescue Services, Home Guards and Civil Defence
- In office 26 September 2025 – 31 July 2026

31st Director General of the Border Security Force
- In office 14 June 2023 – 31 July 2024
- Preceded by: Pankaj Kumar Singh
- Succeeded by: Daljit Singh Chaudhary

Personal details
- Born: 27 July 1966 (age 60) Delhi, India
- Education: IIT Delhi; Panjab University
- Occupation: IPS officer
- Profession: Civil servant
- Awards: Indian Police Medal for Meritorious Service (2007) President's Police Medal for Distinguished Service (2015)

Nitin Agrawal (born 27 July 1966) is a retired 1989 batch Indian Police Service (IPS) officer from Kerala cadre and served as the 31st Director General of the Border Security Force of India from 14 June 2023 to 31 July 2024.

== Early life and education ==
Agrawal was born in the year 1966 in Delhi, India. Agrawal completed B. Tech in civil engineering from Indian Institutions of Technology (Delhi) in 1987 and M. Tech from IIT Delhi in 1989. He also has M. Phil in Social Science from Panjab University.

== Career ==
Agrawal worked in different posts in Kerala and with central police forces. He served in the Central Industrial Security Force (CISF), Indo-Tibetan Border Police (ITBP) and Sashastra Seema Bal (SSB). He later served as Additional Director General of the Central Zone and Additional Director General (Operations) at the Central Reserve Police Force (CRPF) headquarters in New Delhi.

In June 2023, Agrawal was appointed Director General of the Border Security Force (BSF). He took charge on 14 June 2023 as the force's 31st Director General. In August 2024, the central government ended his BSF posting early and sent him back to the Kerala cadre. The government order did not give a reason for the decision.

After returning to Kerala, Agrawal was appointed Commissioner of the Kerala Road Safety Authority in October 2024. In September 2025, he became Director General of the Kerala Fire and Rescue Services, Home Guards and Civil Defence. He retired from service on 31 July 2026.

== Awards ==
Agrawal is the recipient of the following awards given by the central government for his service during his career.

- Indian Police Medal for Meritorious Service (2007)
- President's Police Medal for Distinguished Service (2015)
