= Amrit Mohan Prasad =

Director General of the Sashastra Seema Bal

Director General of Sashastra Seema Bal
- In office 15 September 2024 – 31 August 2025
- Preceded by: Daljit Singh Chaudhary
- Succeeded by: Sanjay Singhal

Personal details
- Born: 22 August 1965 (age 60) Odisha, India
- Occupation: IPS officer
- Profession: Civil servant
- Awards: Indian Police Medal awarded by the central government for Meritorious Service President's Police Medal for Distinguished Service

Amrit Mohan Prasad PSM MSM (born 22 August 1965) is a retired 1989- batch Indian Police Service (IPS) officer from Odisha who served as Director General of the Sashastra Seema Bal from 15 September 2024 till 31 August 2025.

== Early life and career ==
Prasad was born on 22 August 1965 in Odisha, India.

Prasad held many positions in Odisha and served as Director General of the Sashastra Seema Bal.

== Accolades ==
Prasad has received:

- Police Medal for Meritorious Service
- President’s Police Medal for Distinguished Service
