= Sanjay Singhal =

Indian IPS officer

Director General of Indo-Tibetan Border Police (Additional Charge)
- Incumbent
- Assumed office 1 November 2026
- Preceded by: Shatrujeet Singh Kapoor

Director General of Sashastra Seema Bal
- Incumbent
- Assumed office 1 September 2025
- Preceded by: Amrit Mohan Prasad

Personal details
- Born: 27 December 1968 (age 57) India
- Occupation: IPS
- Police career
- Allegiance: India
- Department: Indo-Tibetan Border Police
- Service years: 1993 - present
- Rank: Director General

Sanjay Singhal is an IPS officer (1993 Batch) of the Uttar Pradesh cadre. He is currently serving as the Director General of Indo-Tibetan Border Police since 1st November 2026.
