= Nitin Agarwal (disambiguation) =

Nitin Agarwal or Nitin Agrawal may refer to:

- Nitin Agrawal, (born 1981), Indian politician.
- Nitin Agarwal, (born 1966), 1989- batch Indian IPS Officer.
