= President's Medal for Gallantry =

Indian Police and Civil Defence award

President's Medal for Gallantry राष्ट्रपति का वीरता पदक
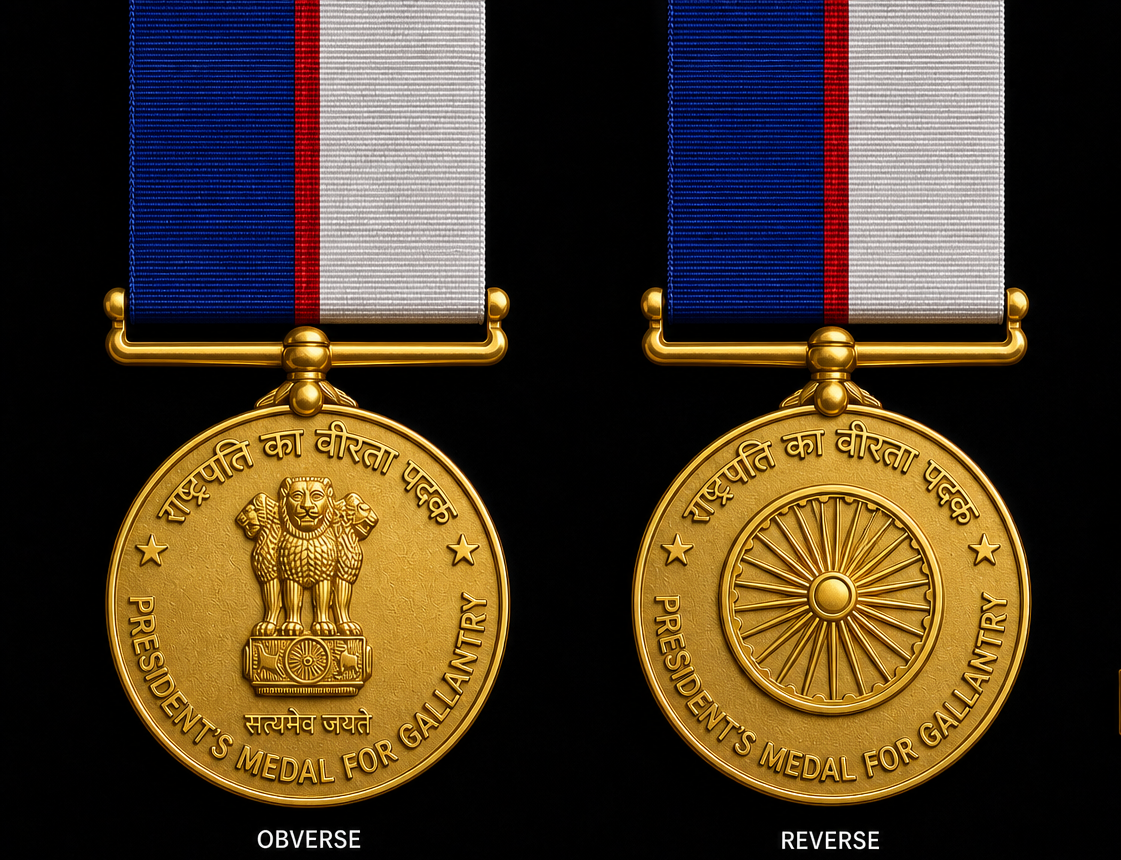
- Type: Police medal
- Country: India
- Presented by: Government of India
- Ribbon
- Established: 1973, awards backdated to 15 August 1947

Precedence
- Next (higher): Shaurya Chakra
- Equivalent: President's Tatrakshak Medal for Gallantry
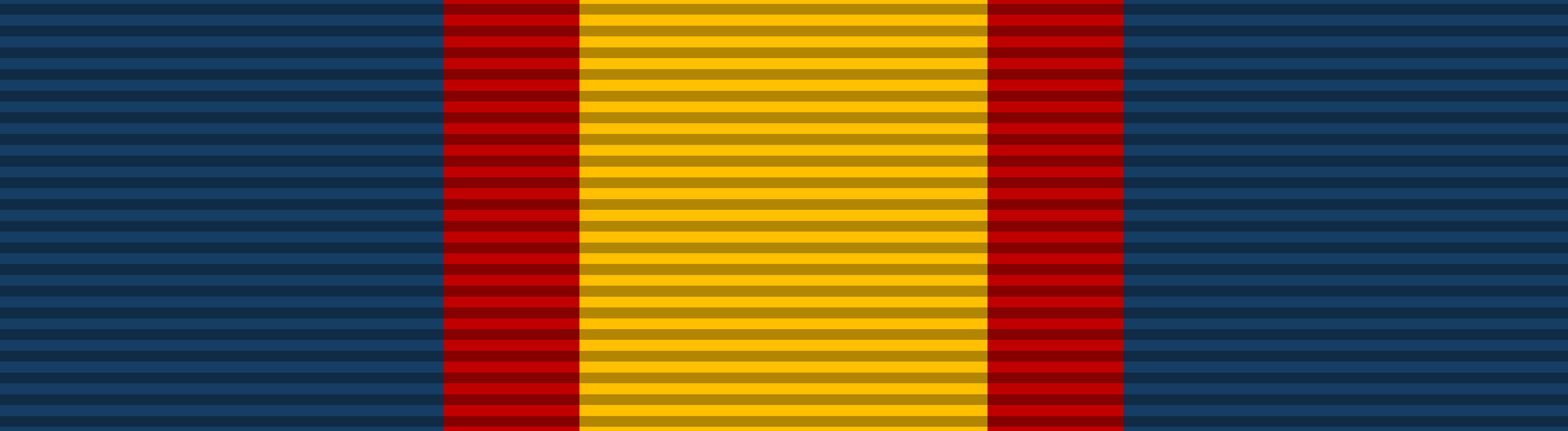
- Next (lower): President's Medal for Distinguished Service

The President's Medal for Gallantry is an Indian Police and Civil Defence award given "to recognize rare conspicuous gallant act."

The medal is announced on the occasion of Republic Day and Independence Day.

== Criteria ==
As per the Government of India, the medal is awarded to only those who has done rare conspicuous gallant act of exceptional courage & skill in saving life and property, or in preventing crime or arresting criminals, apprehending a prisoner or in preventing their escape, the risk incurred being estimated with due regard to the obligations and duties of the officer concerned as a member of Police, Fire, Correctional and Home Guard & Civil Defence Service.

== Eligibility ==
The award is conferred on the members of recognized: -

- Police Forces of States and Union Territories
- Central Police Organizations (CPOs)
- Central Armed Police Forces (CAPFs)
- Fire Service (organized and administered by the Central Ministries or Departments, State Governments, Union Territory Administrations, Municipal and other Autonomous Bodies, and Public Sector Undertakings)
- Prison Administration
- Home Guards and Civil Defence

== Appearance ==
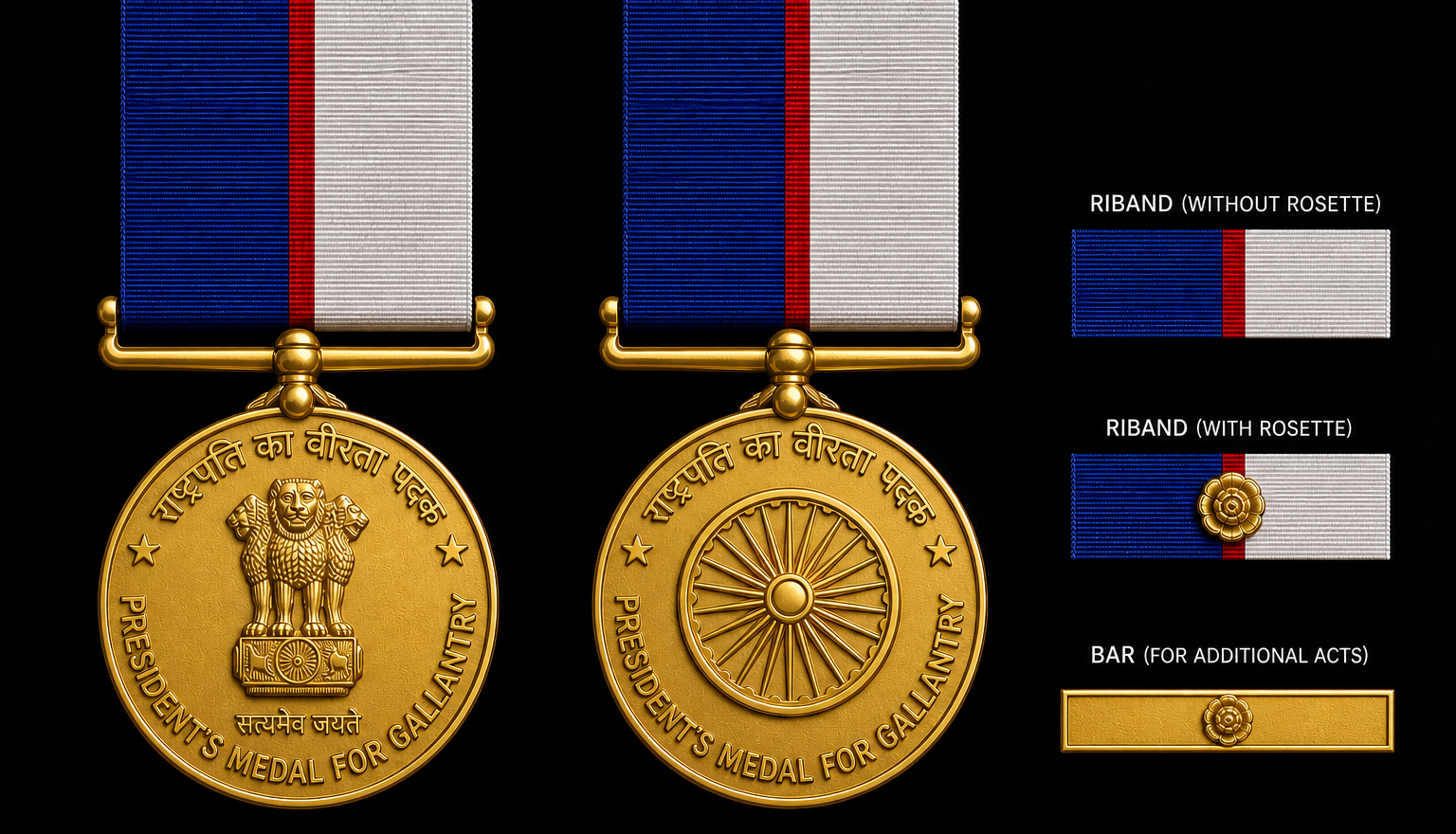
Specifications of the President's Medal for Gallantry

Obverse: The Medal shall be circular in shape, made of silver with gold gilt, one and three eighth inches in diameter, 3 mm in thickness and shall have embossed on the obverse the State Emblem, with its motto “सत्यमेव जयते” in the Centre and shall have engraved on the upper edge, the words “राष्ट्रपति का वीरता पदक” and the words “President’s Medal for Gallantry” inscribed on the lower edge thereof. Hindi and English inscription shall be separated by a small Star appearing on either side.

Reverse: it shall have embossed the “Ashok Chakra” in the centre and the words “राष्ट्रपति का वीरता पदक” and the words “President’s Medal for Gallantry” on the upper and lower edge respectively. Hindi and English inscription shall be separated by a small Star appearing on either side.

Riband: Each medal shall be suspended from the left breast and the riband, of an inch and three eighth in width, shall be half blue and half silver white, the two colours being separated by a vertical red line 1/8” in width.

Bar: For every such additional act, an additional Bar may be added and for each Bar awarded, a small silver rose with gold gilt shall be added to the riband when worn alone.

== Selection process ==
- A Committee of Senior Officers: For examination and selection of nominees at Central/State/UT Agency Level, constituted by the head of the Organizations. Thereafter, the respective Organization will submit the nominations of the same to this Ministry after completing all the codal formalities.
- A Sub-Committee: It is formed with the approval of Union Home Secretary at the level of Ministry of Home Affairs to scrutinize the nominations and assist the Central Awards Committee.
- A Central Awards Committee : Compositions of following members will make the final recommendations.

Central Awards Committee
Member	Designation
Home Secretary	Chairman
Special/Additional Secretary (In charge of Police-I Division, MHA)	Member
Secretary of the Research and Analysis Wing	Member
Director of the Intelligence Bureau	Member
Director of the Central Bureau of Investigation	Member
Directors General of 2 CAPFs (by rotation)	Member
Directors General of 2 States (by rotation)	Member
Joint Secretary (Police)	Member

== See also ==
- Medals of Indian Police and Civil Forces
- Orders, decorations, and medals of India
- Orders, decorations, and medals of British India
- State Armed Police Forces
- Paramilitary forces of India
- Law enforcement in India
- Indian Armed Forces
