= Archana Ramasundaram =

Indian police officer

Archana Ramasundaram IPS (Retd.)
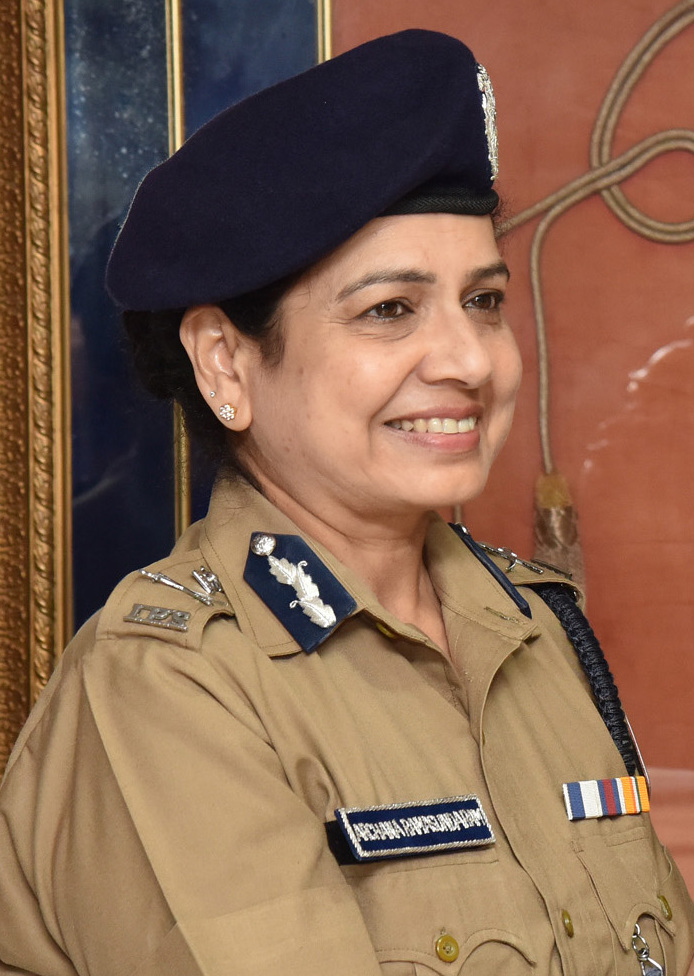
- Archana Ramasundaram in 2016
- Born: 1 October 1957 (age 68)
- Education: University of Rajasthan; University of Southern California
- Occupation: Police officer
- Known for: First female chief to head a paramilitary force
- Spouse: Ramasundaram
- Relatives: Charubala Tondaiman (sister-in-law)

Archana Ramasundaram (born 1 October 1957), also spelt as Archana Ramasundram, is a retired Indian police officer who was a member of Tamil Nadu Police. She served in the Indian Police Service (IPS) for 37 years until her retirement in 2018 and was the first woman police officer of India to lead a central paramilitary force. Her husband Ramasundaram served as a senior state IAS officer in the state of Tamil Nadu until 2011.

== Career ==
She pursued her career as a police officer after her graduation in Economics from the University of Rajasthan. She joined the Indian Police Service in 1980 and was the only woman officer in the 1980 batch. In 1989, she completed her Master of Science in Criminology from the University of Southern California. In 1995, she was awarded the President's Medal.

In May 2014, she joined the CBI as additional director and was the first woman officer in India to be inducted as an additional director in the Central Bureau of Investigation. Her appointment was legally challenged by the Government of Tamil Nadu at the Supreme Court considering it as an illegal appointment and the Supreme Court gave verdict against the appointment of Archana. She was also suspended from the post of DGP by the Tamil Nadu government for not requesting permission prior to the appointment.

In 2015, she was sacked from the CBI and was appointed as the Director General of the National Crime Records Bureau. However she was nominated for the position of CBI chief in 2017 despite her controversial selection into the CBI in 2015.

On 3 February 2016, she was appointed as the Director General of Sashastra Seema Bal (SSB) and was the first woman police officer to be officially appointed to lead a central armed police force. In July 2018, Archana was replaced by Rajni Kant Mishra as the new Director General of Sashatra Seema Bal division. Archana retired from the IPS in 2018, a career which spanned for 37 years. In, March 2019 she was appointed as a non-judicial member of Lokpal where she served till March 2024.

== See also ==
- List of people from Tamil Nadu
