= Pranay Sahay =

Secretary (Security)
- In office 17 June 2011 – 31 October 2011
- Preceded by: B. K. Dey
- Succeeded by: A. B. Mathur

Personal details
- Occupation: Indian Police Service Officer

Pranay Sahay is an Indian Police Service officer of the 1975 batch and was the Director General of Police of the Central Reserve Police Force, the largest paramilitary force in India. He was the Director General of Police (DG) of the Sashastra Seema Bal (SSB) before the CRPF posting. The DG's present main agenda is to tackle the rampant maoism and terrorism in India.

Mr Sahay retired from active service on July 31, 2013. He is working now as an adviser to the Police Department.
