= Harbhajan Singh (mountaineer) =

Indian mountaineer

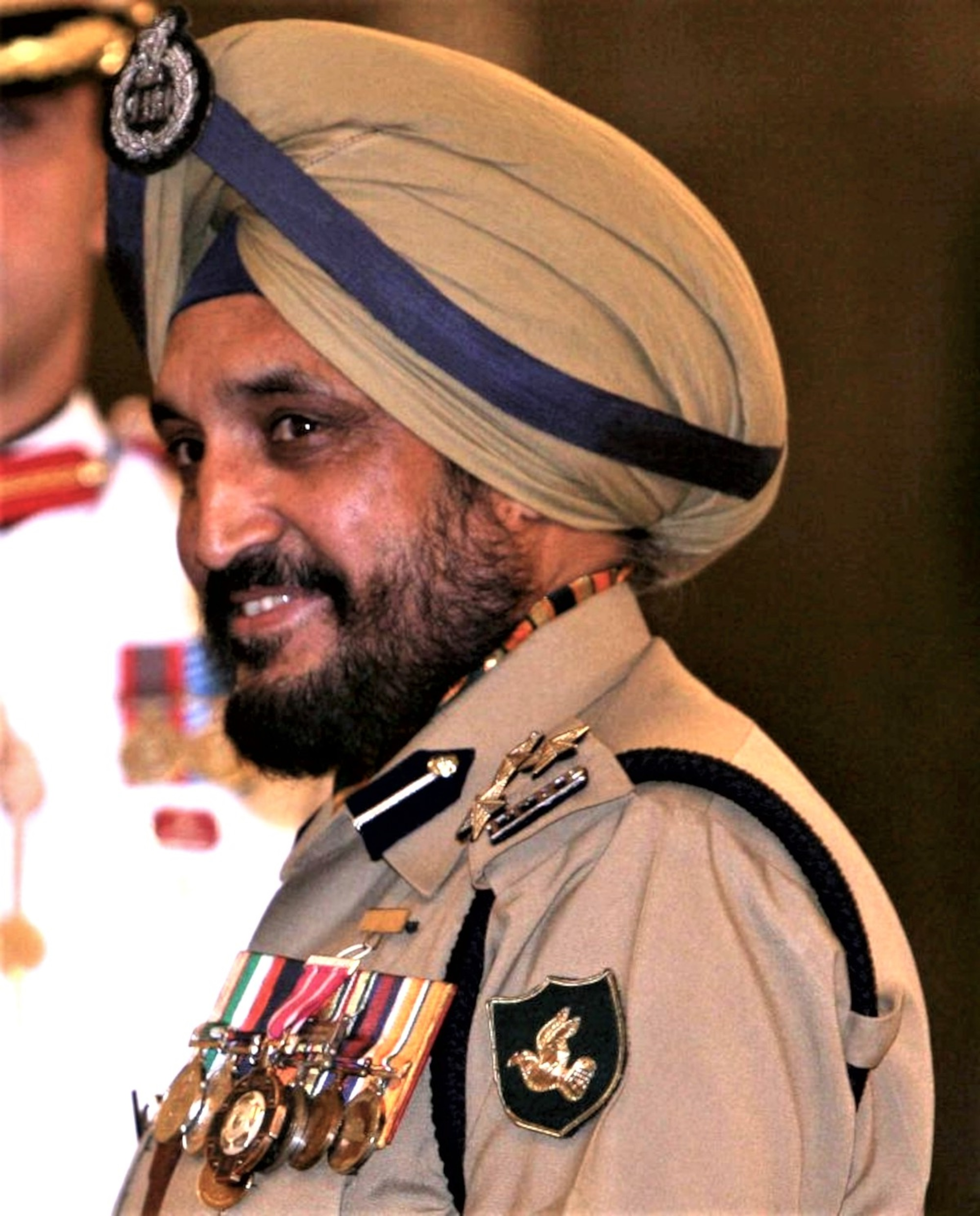
- 2021 by Sarbjit Bahga
- Born: 10 September 1956 (age 69); Punjab, India
- Occupation: Sportsperson
- Years active: Since 1986
- Awards: Padma Shri; President’s Police Medal; ITBP Insignia; Kishan Singh and Nain Singh Award

Harbhajan Singh is an Indian mountaineer, known for his successful mountaineering expeditions of Mount Everest, Mount Nanda Devi and many other peaks in the Himalayan region. The Government of India honored him in 2011, with the fourth highest civilian award of Padma Shri.

== Biography ==
Will-power acts as fuel to the fire of training before any expedition. The toughest part of the training is to gauge the mood of the mountain, particularly in the last phase when the air becomes too thin to breathe. An able mountaineer should know when exactly to terminate his expedition in case of inclement weather, says Harbhajan Singh.

Harbhajan Singh was born in a very small village named Dholowal of District Hoshiarpur, Punjab, India on the 10th of September 1956. As a child, he was known for his athleticism. He won several medals in various sports at the state level in the under 18 years old age group. He was considered the best athlete at Khalsa College Garhdiwala. When he was completing his post Graduation from Government college Hoshiarpur he learned judo and as it was a new sport in Punjab, he excelled and won medals in various state level competitions. He represented Punjab in Judo and won Gold medal in National judo championship held at Indore ( MP) in 1979. In addition to participating in sports he used to take active part in various other activities at the college. He remained NCC cadet and is “C” certificate holder, he was NSS volunteer and took part in various camps for social service activities, he remained editor of college magazine for punjabi section and an active member of student central association of the college . His career began in 1980 when he joined Indo-Tibetan Border Police as a gazetted officer through a national level competitive exam and is currently the incumbent Inspector General of ITBP.

Singh is credited with three Mt. Everest expeditions and his performance remained remarkable for the significant successful attempts. Since then, he has to his credit successful expeditions to Mt.Nanda Devi, the third highest peak in India, and many others such as Mount Abhigamin, Mt. Kamet & Mt.Abhigamin, Mount Mana, Mt. Stopanth, Mount Nunkun, Mt.White Needle (twice), Mount Pinnacle, Mount Pyramid, Mt. North Pyramid, Mt. Sphinx, Mt. Panchachuli, Mount Stok Kangri (twice in winters) Mount Kasket and four un-named peaks(03 in Leh-Ladakh and 01 in H.P) He also has led a team of skiers who skied down after climbing Mt. Abhigamin in 2007 and later on ski down from the 3rd camp (Ht.approximately 23000 ft.) of Mount Everest in 2009.

== Awards and recognitions ==
Harbhajan Singh is a recipient of various following Awards and recognitions conferred by the Government of India and Government of Punjab for his spectacular and significant achievements in the field of Mountaineering and adventure sports and outstanding and meaningful performance as an officer of elite ITBPOLICE Force :-

a) Padmashri Award in 2011.

b) Tenzing Norgay National Adventure Award in 2016.

c) Maharaja Ranjit Singh Award (highest sports Award of Punjab) in 2019.

d) IMF Nain singh & Kishan singh life time achievement award in 2011.

e) President’s Police Medal for Distinguished services in 2011.

f) President’s Police medal for Meritorious services in 2005.

g) DG ITBPOLICE Insignia & Commendation roll -13 times.

Indian Mountaineering Foundation has also extended life membership to him for his significant contributions in the field of mountaineering and promoting adventure activities at International and National level

.

He was featured in “Limca book of records and quiz competition books prepared for competitive exam” for his contribution in the field of mountaineering and promoting adventure activities at International and National level.

== See also ==
- Adventure sports
- Limca Book of World Records
