= Indo-Tibetan Border Police =

Indian border guard for the Indo-Tibetan border

- Emblem of the Indo-Tibetan Border Police

- Indo-Tibetan Border Police Flag
- Abbreviation: ITBP
- Motto: शौर्य दृढ़ता कर्म निष्ठा Shaurya Dridhata Karm Nishtha; Valour Steadfastness and Commitment

Agency overview
- Formed: 24 October 1962; 64 years ago
- Employees: 89,432 active personnel
- Annual budget: ₹11,324.08 crore (US$1.2 billion) (2026-27)

Jurisdictional structure
- Federal agency: India
- Operations jurisdiction: India
- Governing body: Ministry of Home Affairs
- Constituting instrument: Indo-Tibetan Border Police Force Act, 1992
- General nature: Federal law enforcement

Operational structure
- Headquarters: New Delhi, India
- Minister responsible: Amit Shah, Minister of Home Affairs
- Agency executive: Sanjay Singhal, IPS, Director General (Additional Charge)

Facilities
- Boats: 30

Website
- itbp.mha.gov.in

The Indo-Tibetan Border Police (ITBP) is a central armed police force in India, under the Ministry of Home Affairs, Government of India. It is responsible for guarding India's border with Tibet Autonomous Region of China. It was formed in the aftermath of the Sino-Indian War of 1962.

== History ==
The Indo-Tibetan Border Police (ITBP) was established 24 October 1962, following the Sino-Indian War. It was raised under the CRPF Act primarily to create a resistance force from among the civilian population against foreign encroachments and infiltration. It had a strength of 4 battalions and was deployed in Himachal Pradesh and the areas of present-day Uttarakhand. It collected intelligence and worked on improving Indian communication systems along the Chinese border. ITBP is said to have taken part in 1965 Indo Pakistani War as well as the Indo Pakistani war of 1971.

In 1975, the charter of ITBP was changed and it was made responsible for the management of India's northern borders to guard against illegal movements across borders and the exploitation of borders by criminals. In 1978 the force was reorganized with 9 service battalions, 4 specialist battalions and 2 training centres. The raising officer of the ITBP was Lt Col. Nasib Singh of the Indian Army.

ITBP provided security services for the 1982 Asian Games as well as 7th Summit of the Non-Aligned Movement and the 1983 Commonwealth Heads of Government Meeting. In 1987, 6 more battalions of ITBP were raised to stop bank robberies in the state of Punjab, in the final stages of the insurgency in Punjab. From 1989 to 2004, the ITBP also had a minor presence in Jammu and Kashmir to combat the insurgency in Kashmir.

In 1992, an ITBP Act was passed by the Parliament, making ITBP responsible for guarding the entire Indo-Tibetan border, 3,488 kilometres long from the Karakoram Pass in Ladakh to Jarep La in Arunachal Pradesh. The rules of the ITBP act were framed in 1994. In 2004, ITBP replace the Assam Rifles in Sikkim and Arunachal Pradesh. It previously worked in cooperation with the Assam Rifles for patrolling the border. This decision was made on the basis of recommendations made by a committee set up in the aftermath of the 1999 Kargil War under the principle of "One Border, One Force".

== Organization ==
The tableau of ITBP passes through the Rajpath, on the occasion of the 69th Republic Day Parade 2018, in New Delhi on January 26, 2018.

The ITBP is divided into 2 commands which are headed by an Additional Director General of Police and 5 frontiers each headed by an Inspector General of Police (IG). These frontiers are further divided into 15 sectors each headed by a Deputy Inspector General (DIG). Frontiers of the ITBP are as follows: Northern Frontier(Dehradun), North-Eastern Frontier(Itanagar), North-Western Frontier(Leh), Central Frontier(Bhopal) and lastly, Eastern Frontier(Lucknow)

It has 64 battalions (60 regular and 4 specialist), 17 training centres and 7 logistics establishments above 64 battalions include 2 rescue battalions which are deputed to the National Disaster Response Force.

== Roles ==
The ITBP Marching Contingent passes through the Rajpath, on the occasion of the 69th Republic Day Parade 2018, in New Delhi on January 26, 2018.

The ITBP marching contingents passes through the Rajpath during the 66th Republic Day Parade 2015, in New Delhi on January 26, 2015.

The primary role of the ITBP is to patrol the 3,488-km India-China border from the Karakoram Pass in Ladakh to Diphu La in Arunachal Pradesh, for which it has 32 battalions and 157 outposts. The border posts patrolled by ITBP are as high as 18,900 and vulnerable to high velocity storms, snow blizzards, avalanches, and landslides, besides the hazards of high altitude and extreme cold, where the temperature dips up to minus 40-degree Celsius. The ITBP conducts long and short range patrols to keep an effective vigil on the inaccessible and uninhabited areas located near the border.

In peacetime, ITBP has the role of keeping vigil on ingress routes and prevent border violations, control trans-border crimes, illegal traffic and unauthorised civilian ingress and egress. It is tasked with coordination with the Intelligence Bureau (IB). In wartime, the force comes under the operational control of the Indian Army, its role includes securing vital installations, law and order responsibilities along the border and any occupied areas, guarding infiltration routes, and acting as guides to the Army.

Disaster rescue is the other major role of the ITBP. It is the first responder for natural disasters in the Himalayas and has 8 Regional Response Centres in Himachal Pradesh, Uttarakhand and Northeast India.

The force has undertaken numerous mountaineering expeditions. Its skiers have been national champions, who have competed in Winter Olympics. Its river rafters have created international history in rafting through the turbulent white waters of the Brahmaputra, the Indus and the Ganges. The Force has created a milestone by becoming the first Central Paramilitary Force to win the Best Marching Contingent Trophy in the Republic Day parades in 1998, 1999, 2000 and 2011. It broke new ground in 1998 when it sent the first-ever police tableau of the country to participate in the Republic Day Parade. ITBP is at the forefront of a movement for the preservation of Himalayan environment and ecology.

ITBP had provided a quarantine camp at Chhawala in New Delhi for potentially infected persons during the COVID-19 pandemic who were evacuated from Wuhan. It had also set up camps at its other locations in the country for further quarantine. It has also been credited with running the world's largest Sardar Patel Covid Care Centre at SPCCC, Radha Soami Beas, Chhatarpur, New Delhi when it treated coronavirus patients during the 1st, 2nd and 3rd waves of the COVID-19 pandemic in New Delhi.

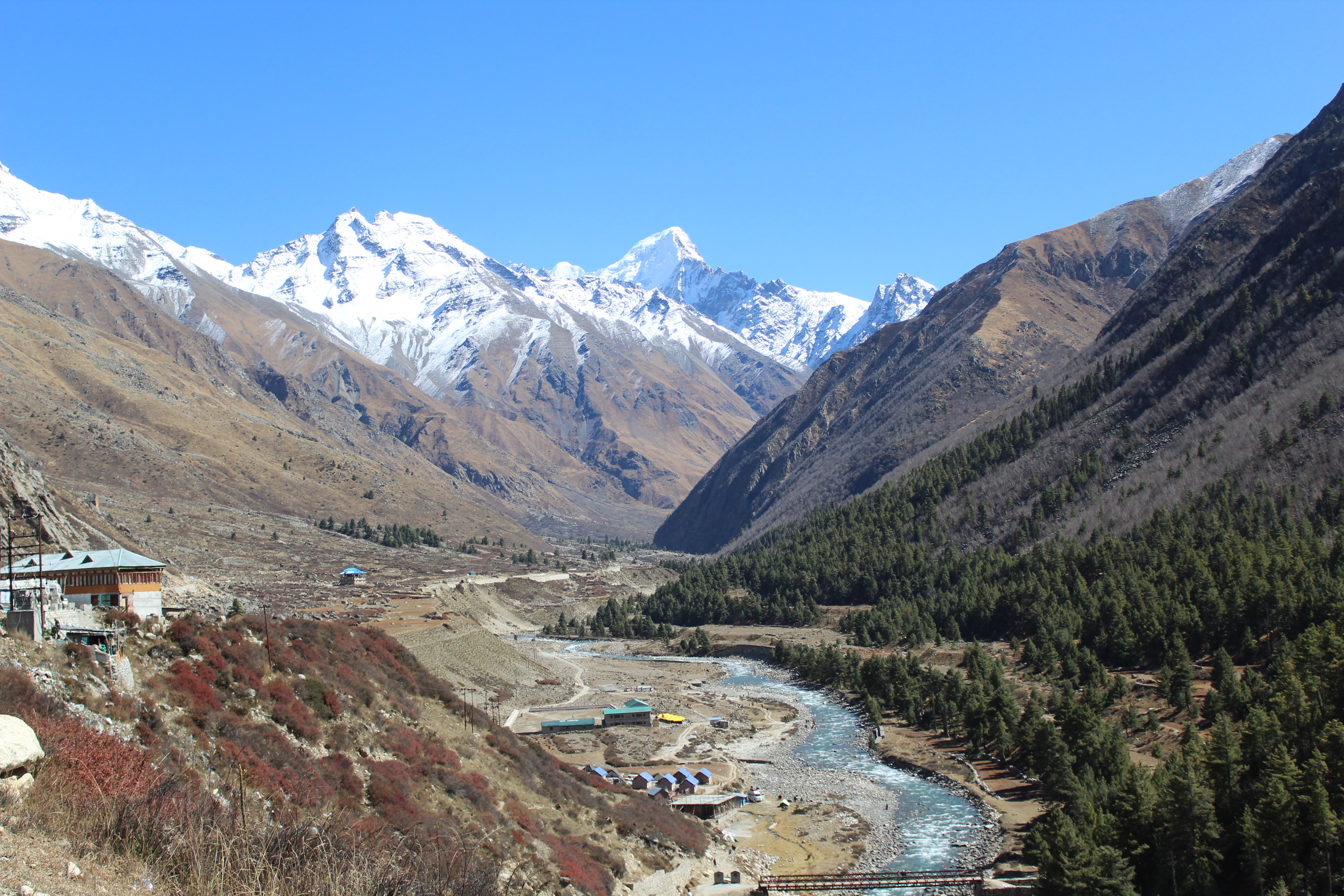
Chitkul Village, as seen from the road to the ITBP checkpost

ITBP has been involved in greening the Himalayan regions especially in Inner Himalayas. Being the only human presence in some areas close to China border, it has taken on itself the task of maintaining the delicate balance of flora and fauna.

ITBP has been involved in providing personal securities to VVIPs such as Murali Manohar Joshi, Omar Abdullah and Mehbooba Mufti but Home Ministry is considering to withdraw it from protection duties.

== Personnel ==
=== Training ===
ITBPs major training centre is located at Mussoorie, in Uttarakhand. The Training Academy was established in 1976 and trains officers of the force. The training programme for Subordinate Officers of the force are conducted at Central Training College, Alwar and Basic Training College, Bhanu (Haryana). Specialised training programmes in rock craft, explosives handling etc. are also conducted here. Ace mountaineer and Padma Shri awardee, Harbhajan Singh, IG heads this institution. Keeping in view the evolving security scenario of the country, ITBP established a Counter Insurgency and Jungle Warfare (CIJW) School at an altitude of 6,000 feet in the heart of extremely tough Himalayan mountains, at Mahidanda in Uttarkashi district. The CIJW school (distinct from the premier CIJWS of the Indian Army) provides training to ITBP's men and officers in anti-Naxal operations. Jungle warfare, handling of explosives, rock craft, survival in adverse conditions, unarmed combat, and guerrilla warfare are some of the subjects taught here. On account of demands for realistic anti-Naxal training the CIJW School of ITBP was shifted to Belgaum, Karnataka.

The training regime, formulated under the close supervision of Rajiv Mehta, IPS and executed on the ground by Sanjeev Raina, DIG is considered extremely demanding both mentally and physically, needing special preparation. The presence of the force along the Indo-China border where it maintains vigil along the extremely high altitude border area. The troops of the force watch for any violation of the border, trans-border smuggling, and affords a sense of security to the remotely located isolated settlements. The altitude where the troops are deployed range up to 18,800 feet and the temperature plummets to minus 30 degrees Celsius during winter with snowfall of more than ten feet.

The Himveers are taught to function effectively while always keeping in mind human rights and the codes of war which always guide their conduct.

The Basic Training Centre at Bhanu, Haryana; ITBP Academy at Mussourie and the Mountaineering & Skiing Institute at Auli run the training programmes and conduct indoor and outdoor training activities, in pursuance of this mission.

ITBP is building a full-fledged recreation and training centre in Belgaum at Halbhavi. ITBP will relocate the personal and will have large family bases in Belgaum for its soldiers after high altitude stress.

Personnel of veterinary wing of ITBP are trained in yak handling and management, at ICAR-National Research Institute on Yak. Yaks are used by ITBP for transportation and logistics.

The ITBP is trained in the Civil Medical Camp for disaster management, and addressing nuclear, biological and chemical disasters.

It has also established a National Centre for Training in Search, Rescue & Disaster response at Bhanu, Haryana which is imparting training to personnel of ITBP and other Paramilitary / State Police Forces. There is also a training centre for dogs at Basic Training centre situated at Bhanu. The centre is known as NICD.

=== Ranks and insignia ===
Officers

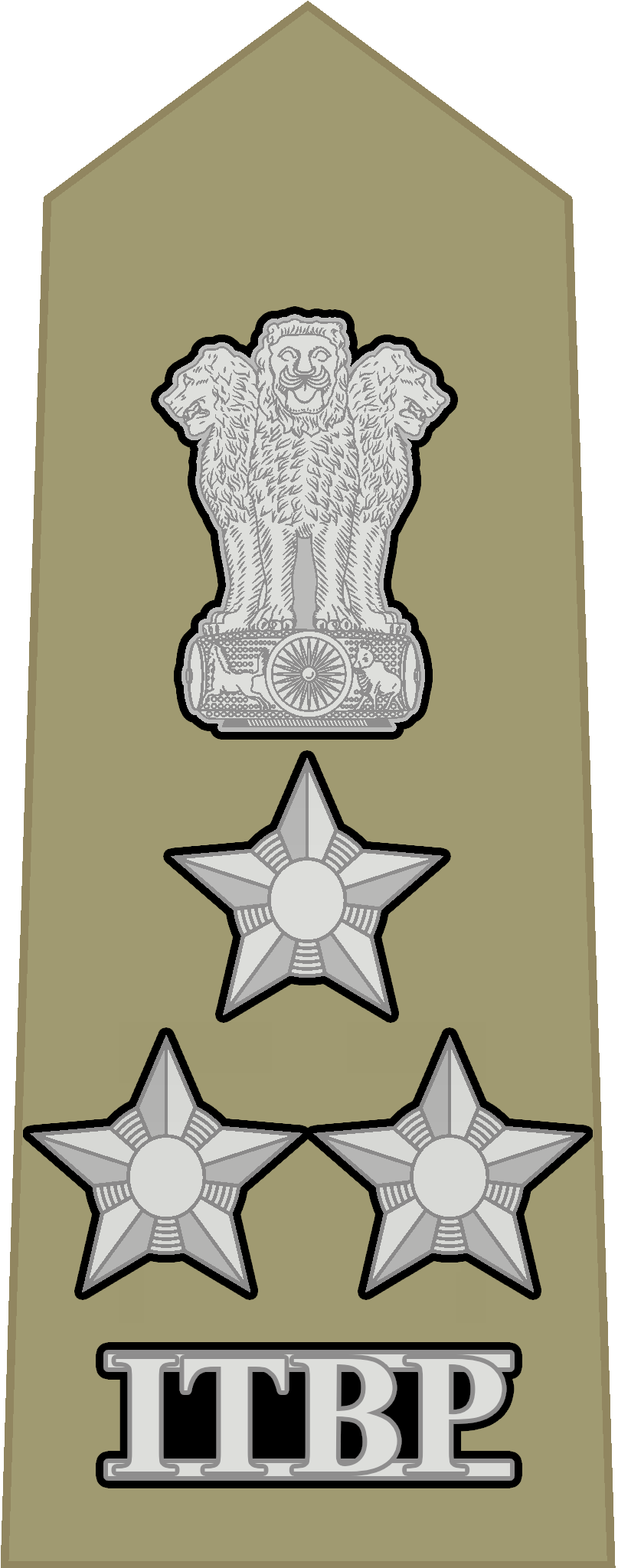
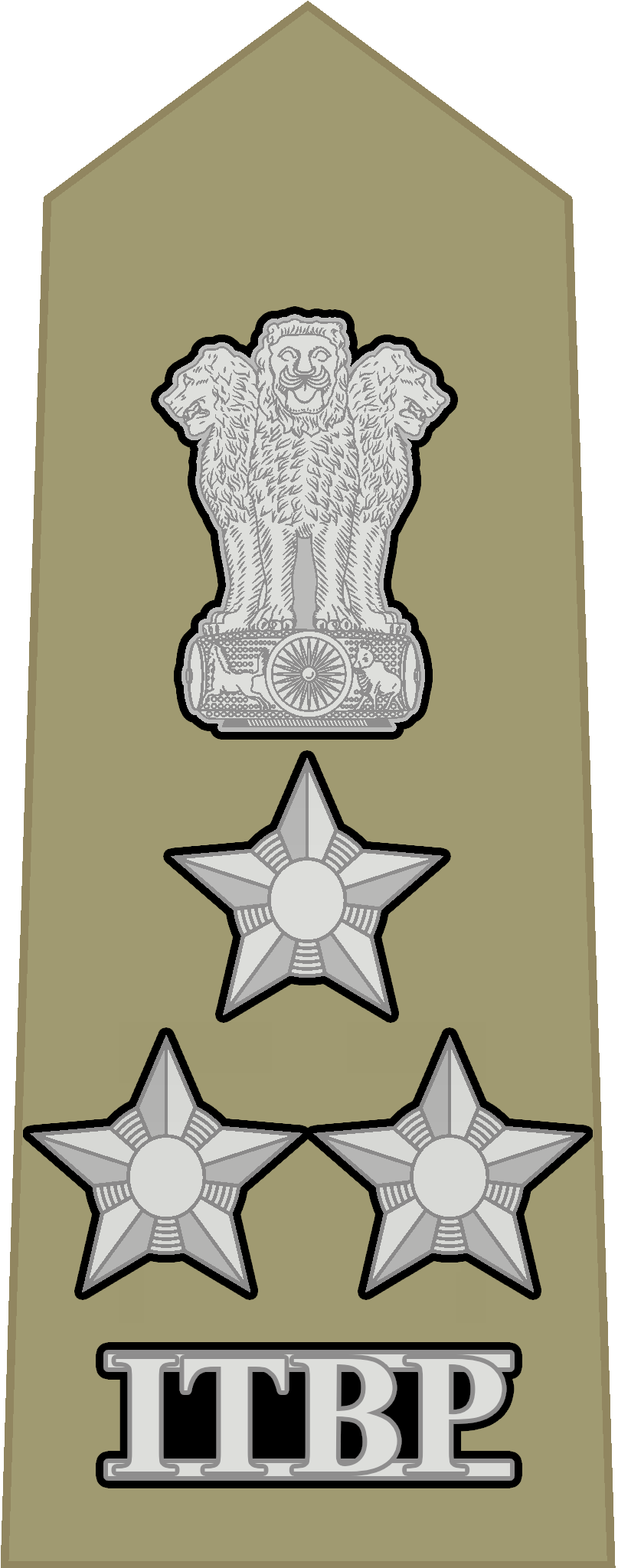
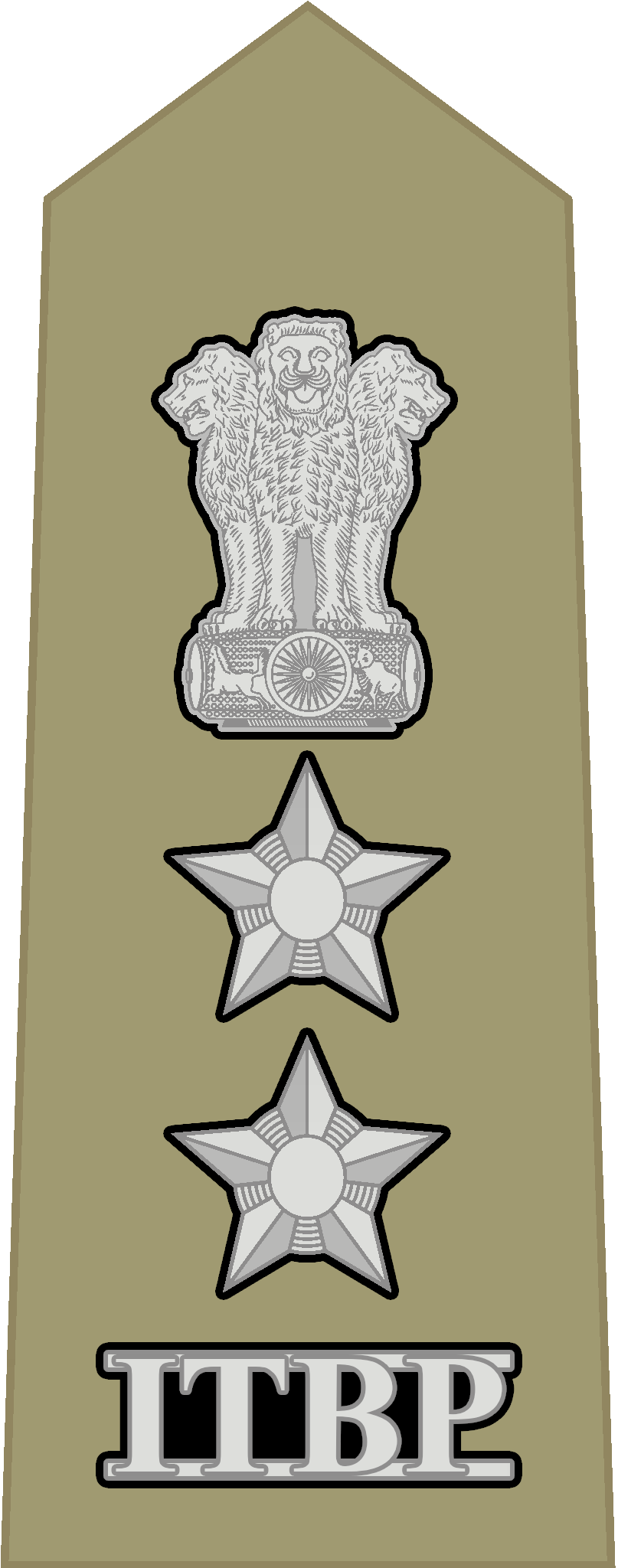
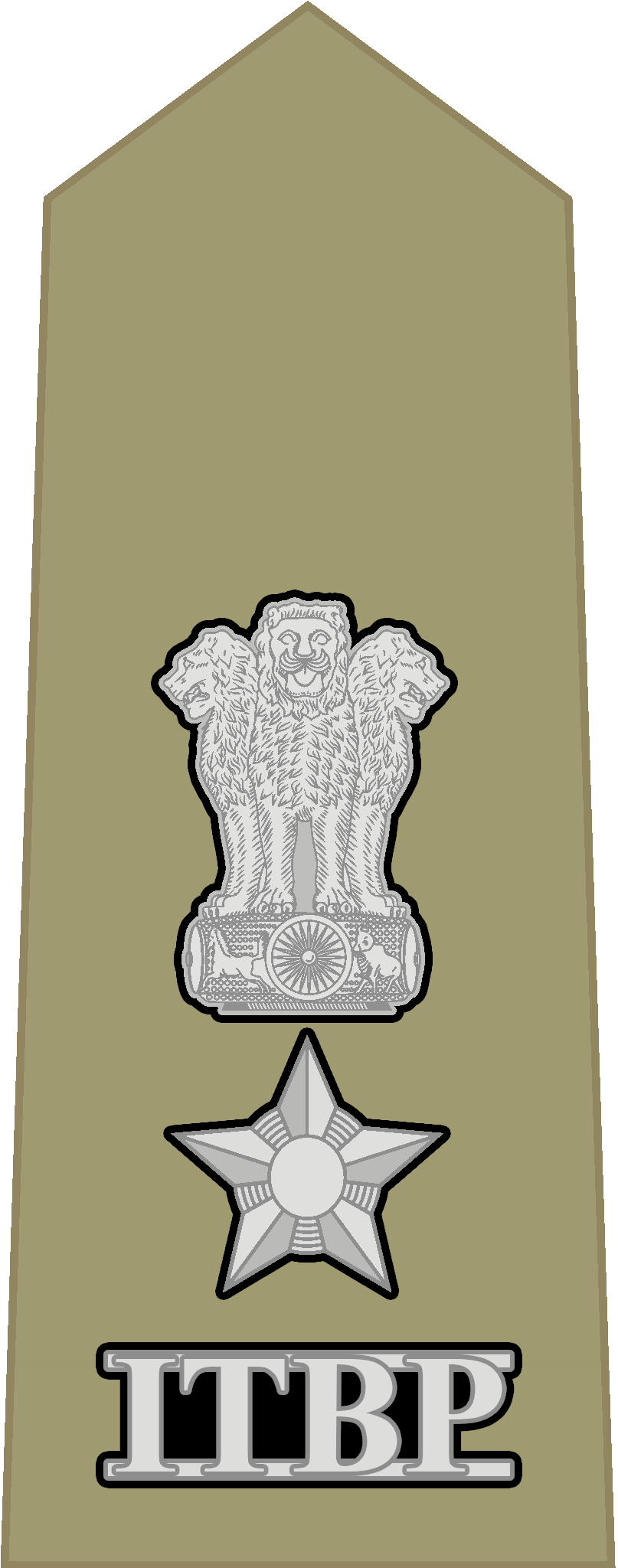
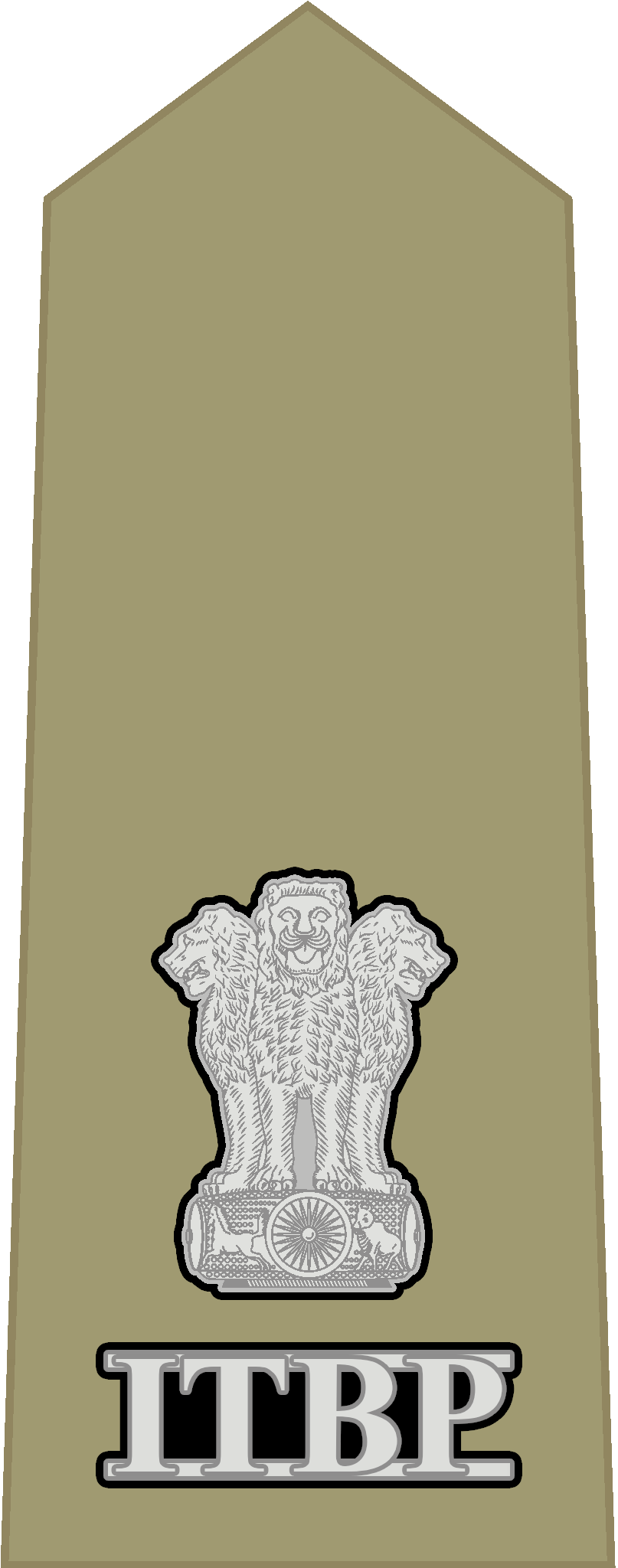
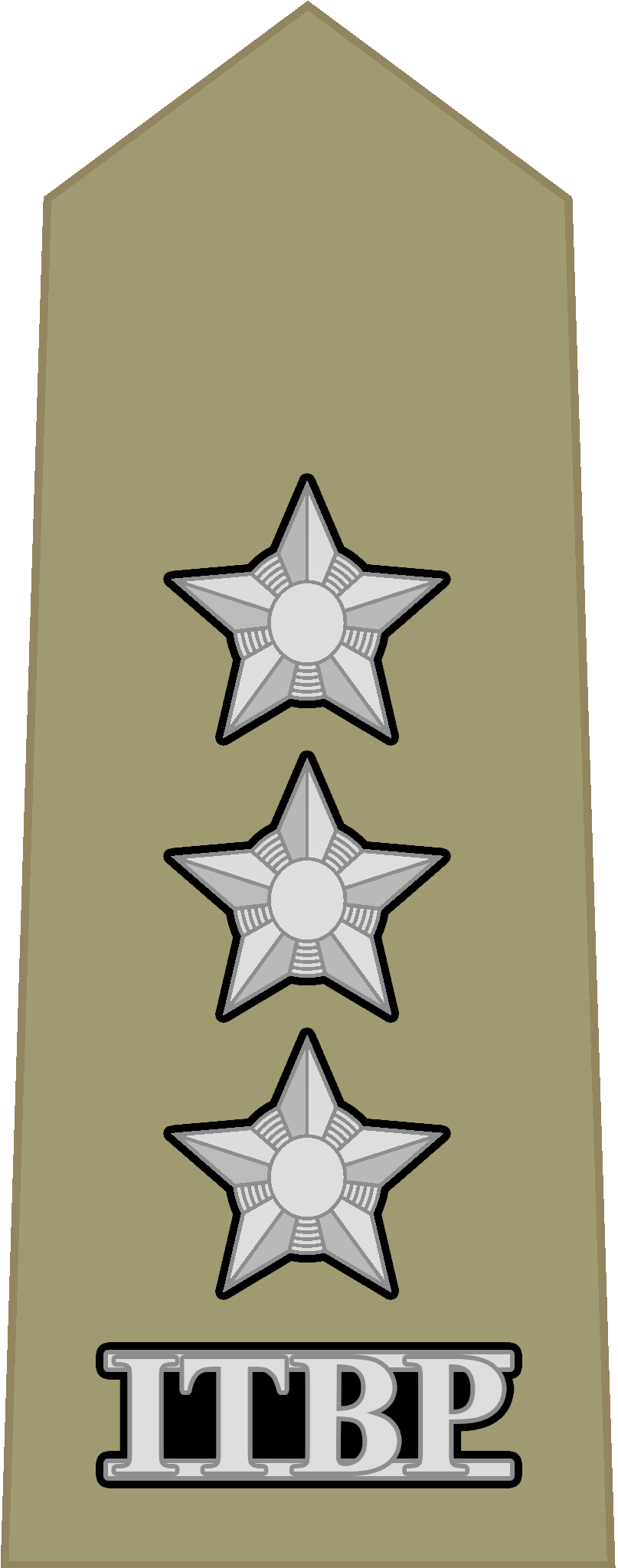
Rank group	General / flag officers					Senior officers			Junior officers
Indo-Tibetan Border Police
Indo-Tibetan Border Police	Director-general -	Additional director-general -	Inspector general -	Deputy inspector-general -	Additional deputy inspector-general -	Commandant -	Second-in-command -	Deputy commandant -	Assistant commandant -

Personnel below officer rank

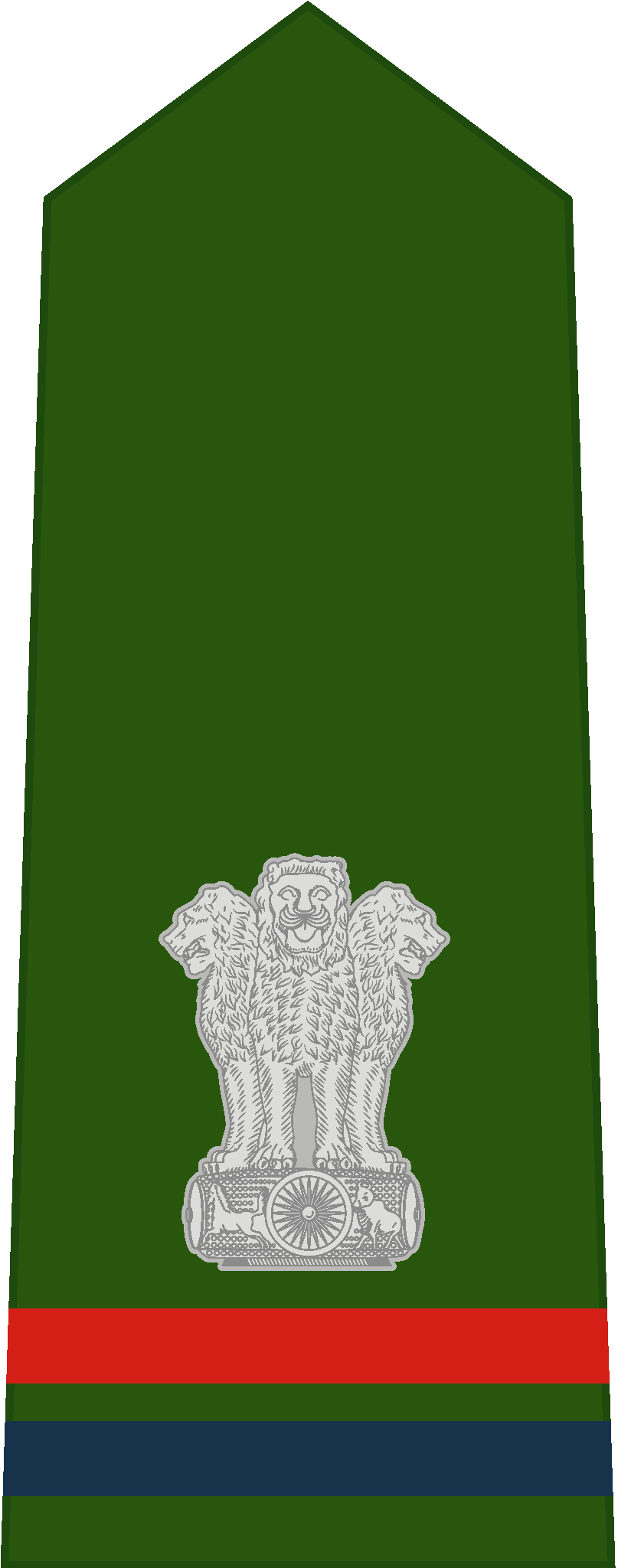
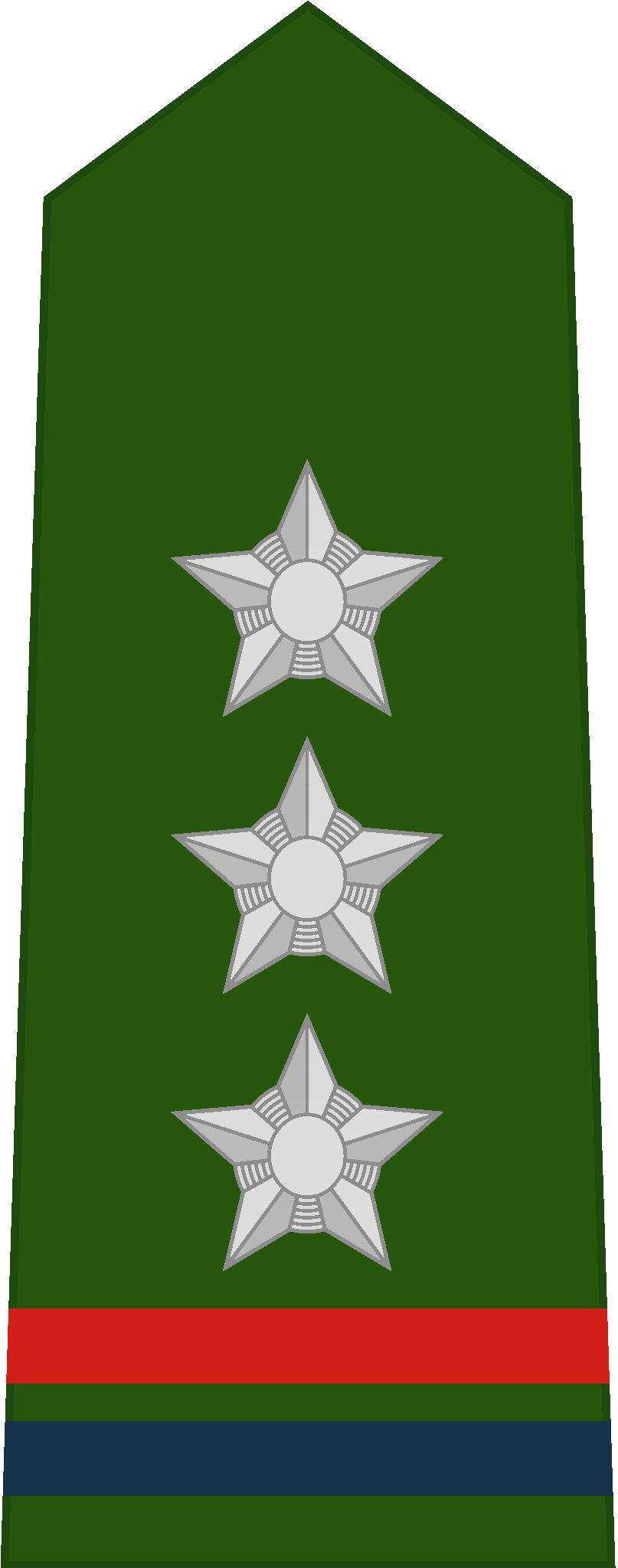
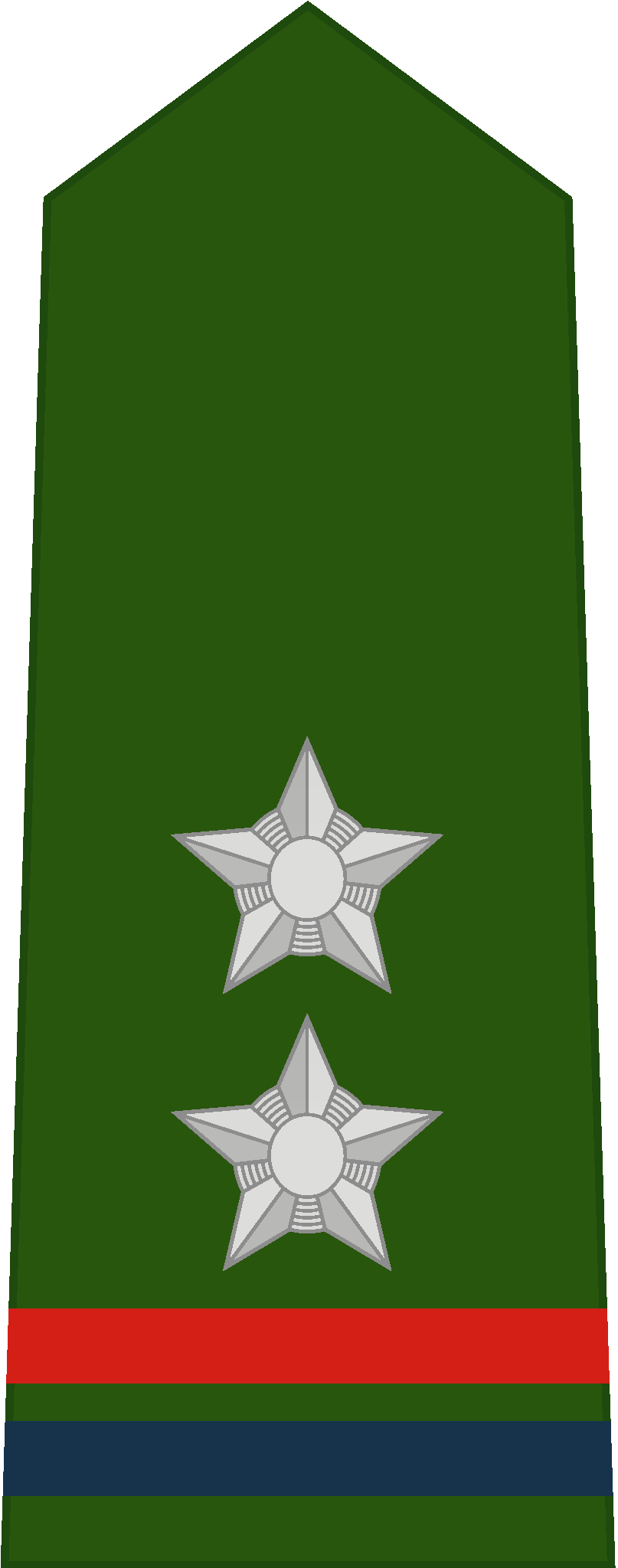
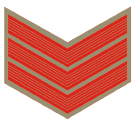
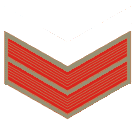
Rank group	Subordinate Officers (SO)			Non commissioned officers (NCO)			Enlisted
Indo-Tibetan Border Police							No insignia
Indo-Tibetan Border Police	Subedar major सूबेदार मेजर	Subedar/Inspector सूबेदार/निरीक्षक	Sub inspector उप निरीक्षक	Head constable हवलदार	Naik नायक	Lance naik लांस नायक	Constable कनिष्ठबल

=== Community activities ===
==== Sports ====
The ITBP organize an ice-hockey team which is considered one of the strongest in the country with many of its players also participating in the national team. The team have won the Indian Ice Hockey Championship on at least three occasions, most recently in 2019.

==== Social work ====
ITBP also conducts civic action programmes and Border Area Development Programmes for development of local population in the border areas and areas where the Force is deployed.It conducts a large number of civic action programmes in the remote border and terrorist affected areas to provide free and expert medical, health and hygiene care to the civilian population in remote villages.

ITBP is the only Central Armed Police Force in India, which has combatised stress counsellors in its field formations Including the ranks of Deputy Commandants ESC, Assistant Commandant-ESC, Inspector-ESC, Sub Inspector-ESC and Head Constable-ESC. These uniformed stress counsellors also play a major role in improving education for ITBP wards and the local children near ITBP Units. There are 21 ITBP public schools across the country run by ESC personnel of ITBP Police Force.

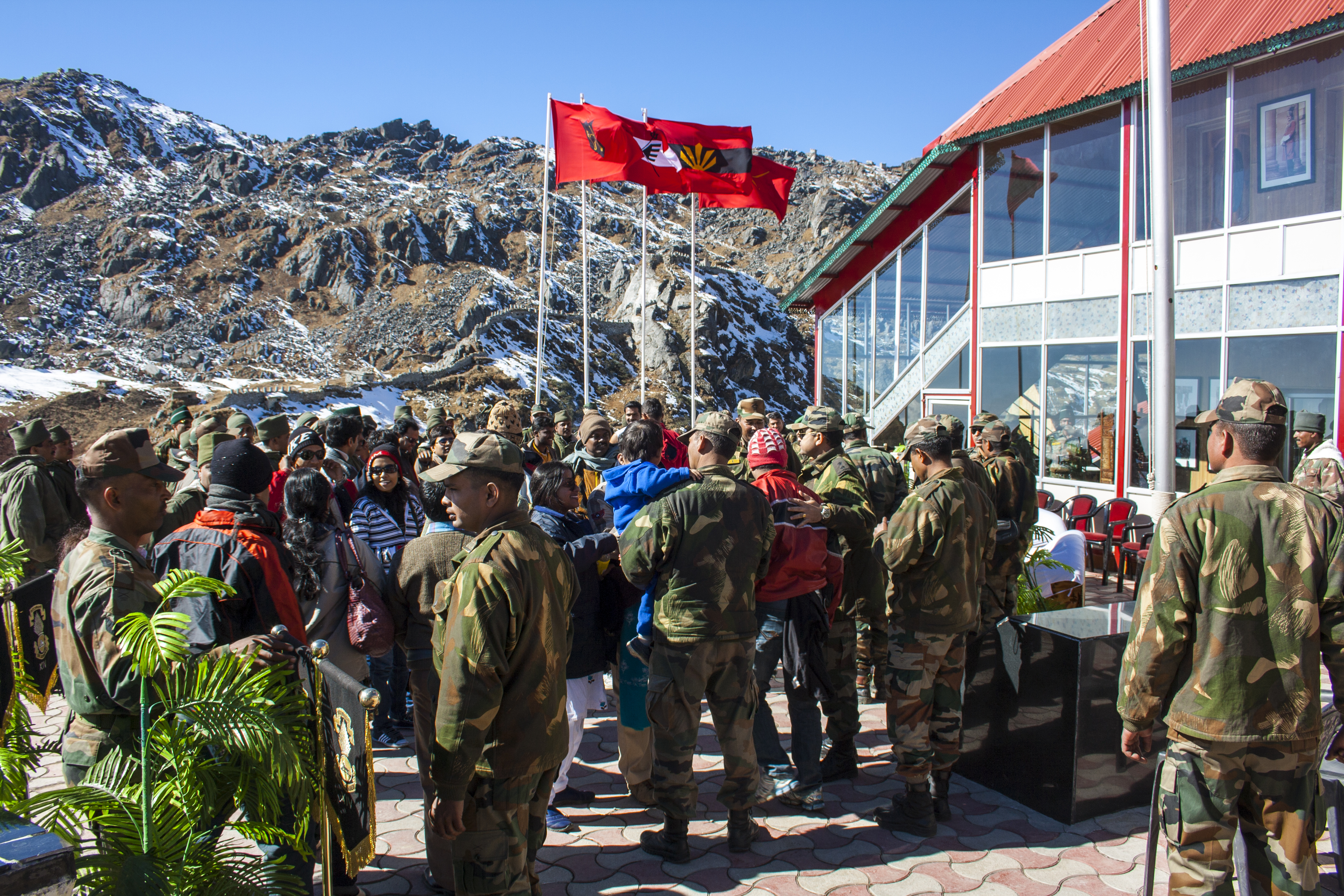
ITBP personnel interacting with civilians in Nathu La

ITBP schools are located in remote areas like Arunachal Pradesh, Assam, Leh and Sonipat, Dwarka Delhi.

=== Himveer Wives' Welfare Association (HWWA) ===
Himveer Wives' Welfare Association is a welfare wing of the Indo-Tibetan Border Police (ITBP). It is a non-profit organisation that works for welfare of spouses, children or any dependents of ITBP personnel. It is registered under the Societies Registration Act, 1860. The association aims to rehabilitate battle casualties and widows of those who are killed in action in the line of duty. Other than that, the association organises vocational training and empowers the beneficiaries. There are more than 88,000 members in the association. The association also works for the welfare of local population in the remote Himalayan region. The formal registration of the family welfare organization of ITBP named "Himveer Wives' Welfare Association" was done on 19 May 1998 in New Delhi. Its motto is ‘Development through active involvement’. It organises annual exhibitions to showcase rare products of Himalayan region, the profit of which is used for welfare of the families of ITBP. It also honors Veer Naris (War Widows) on special occasions and provides them assistance when needed. It organises its Raising Day every year and announces various welfare programmes for its members as well as conducts training programs.

== Line of duty deaths ==
The Indo Tibetan Border Police has a relatively low number of fallen officers compared to the other Central Armed Police Forces, as it is rarely involved in combat. Most of its line of duty deaths are related to natural disasters.

- Assistant Commandant Ashok Kumar Rana was killed in 1998 at Chirwar, in the state of Jammu and Kashmir, in an encounter with terrorists in Jammu and Kashmir.
- Deputy Commandant Joy Lal, HC Khajan Singh, HC Shamsher Singh and CT Kailash Chand were killed in a land mine blast.
- Inspector Raj Kumar was killed in 1997 in a terrorist encounter in Wangam in Jammu and Kashmir, and was posthumously decorated.
- Constable Suresh Kumar was killed in December 1994 in an encounter with terrorists in Jammu and Kashmir, and was posthumously decorated.
- Constable Kishan Ram was killed in March 1994 in an encounter with terrorists in District Anantnag in the state of Jammu and Kashmir, and was posthumously decorated.
- Three members of the ITBP died in an attempt to climb Mount Everest during a severe storm in 1996.
- Constable Ajay Pathania and Roop Singh were killed during 2008 bombing of Indian embassy in Kabul. Both have been honoured with the Kirti Chakra on 15 August 2008.
- Six ITBP personnel died during rescue operations in flood hit Uttarakhand when the Mi-17V5 helicopter of IAF crashed due to bad weather in 2013.
- Assistant Commandant Shri Tikam Singh Negi died in April 2023 during the Special Mission while patrolling at Line of Actual Control.

== Honours and decorations ==
In the course of active duties, the force has earned a number of civil and service honours, and decorations.

Name of award	Number
Padma Shree	6
Kirti Chakra	2
Shaurya Chakra	6
Sena Medal	1
President's Police Medal for Gallantry	19
Police Medal for Gallantry	92
President's Police Medal for Distinguished Service	101
Police Medal for Meritorious Service	292
Prime Minister's Life Saving Medal	86

== See also ==
- Assam Rifles
- Border outpost
- Border Security Force
- Central Industrial Security Force
- Central Reserve Police Force
- Indo-Tibetan Border Police (Water Wing)
- Ministry of Home Affairs
- National Security Guard
- Sashastra Seema Bal
