= Sashastra Seema Bal =

Indian Nepal and Bhutan border force

- Emblem of the Sashastra Seema Bal

- Flag of Sashastra Seema Bal
- Common name: सशस्त्र सीमा बल
- Abbreviation: SSB
- Motto: Service, Security and Brotherhood

Agency overview
- Formed: 20 December 1963; 62 years ago
- Employees: 94,261 active personnel
- Annual budget: ₹10,984.51 crore (US$1.2 billion) (2026–27)

Jurisdictional structure
- Federal agency: India
- Operations jurisdiction: India
- Governing body: Ministry of Home Affairs
- Constituting instrument: Sashastra Seema Bal Act, 2007
- General nature: Federal law enforcement

Operational structure
- Headquarters: New Delhi
- Minister responsible: Amit Shah, Minister of Home Affairs
- Agency executive: Sanjay Singhal, IPS, Director General

Website
- https://ssb.gov.in/

The Sashastra Seema Bal (SSB; transl. Armed Border Force) is a central armed police force in India, under the Ministry of Home Affairs, Government of India. It is responsible for guarding India’s borders with Nepal and Bhutan.

The force was originally set up under the name Special Service Bureau in 1963 in the aftermath of the Sino-Indian War to strengthen India's border areas against enemy operations.

== History ==
The Sashastra Seema Bal was originally set up under the name Special Service Bureau (SSB) on 15 March 1963 (current raising day is 20 December, after the date of presidential assent to the SSB Act, 2007), following the Sino-Indian War of 1962. The primary task of the force was to provide armed support to the foreign intelligence division of Intelligence Bureau, which later became Research and Analysis Wing (after its creation in 1968). The secondary objective was to inculcate feelings of national belonging in the border population and assist them in developing their capabilities for resistance through a continuous process of motivation, training, development, welfare programmes and activities in the then NEFA, North Assam (the northern areas of the Indian state of Assam), North Bengal (the northern areas of the Indian State of West Bengal) and the hills of Uttar Pradesh, Himachal Pradesh and Ladakh. The programme was later extended to Manipur, Tripura, Jammu in 1965; Meghalaya in 1975; Sikkim in 1976; the border areas of Rajasthan and Gujarat in 1989; Manipur, Mizoram and further areas of Rajasthan as well as Gujarat in 1988; South Bengal (the southern areas of West Bengal); Nagaland in 1989; and the Nubra Valley, Rajouri and the Poonch district of Jammu and Kashmir in 1991.

Its primary purpose was to counter an act of aggression by the Chinese People's Liberation Army. The previous thinking had been that, militarily, the Chinese were "superior" to India and in the event of a war, the Chinese might attempt to overwhelm Indian forces. So, in 1963, a unique force was created, which would, in the event of such an attempt by the Chinese to invade and occupy Indian territory, merge with the border population, donning civilian attire, working a parallel administration and carry out the war of India with the help of guerrilla tactics.

In 2001, the SSB was transferred to the Ministry of Home Affairs from R&AW and assigned the duties of manning the Nepal and Bhutan borders. The SSB was renamed the Sashastra Seema Bal, in accordance with its new role, and came under the administrative control of the Ministry of Home Affairs. This was done after the Kargil War with the adoption of the "one border one force concept".

The SSB claims to have presented a "benign face" of the government in border areas and that this was appreciated by the people of those areas.

Pursuant to the recommendations of a group of ministers on reforming the national security system, SSB was declared as a Border Guarding Force and Lead Intelligence Agency (LIA) for Indo-Nepal border (June, 2001) and assigned the task of guarding the 1751 km long Indo-Nepal border along the states of Uttarakhand, (263.7 km with 3 districts), Uttar Pradesh (599.3 km—with 7 districts), Bihar (800.4 km—with 7 districts), West Bengal (105.6 km—with 1 district) and Sikkim (99 km). In March 2004, SSB was assigned the task of guarding the 699 km stretch of Indo-Bhutan border along the states of Sikkim- (32 km), West Bengal (183 km—with 2 districts), Assam (267 km—with 4 districts) and, Arunachal Pradesh (217 km—with 2 districts). Since then SSB was re-christened into Sashastra Seema Bal and reached new heights. SSB is the first border guarding force that has decided to recruit women battalions. It is doing excellent job as Border Guarding Force on Indo-Nepal and Indo-Bhutan Border.

SSB is also engaged in Counter-Insurgency operations in Jammu and Kashmir and Anti-naxal operations in Jharkhand, Bihar and Chhattisgarh. It is also performing internal security duties i.e. Election duties and law and order duties in different parts of India.

SSB celebrated the year 2013 as Golden Jubilee year marking 50 years of its raising. The celebrations have commenced with the Flag-off of a Mount Everest Expedition on 2 April 2013 from Delhi. The team led by Commandant Somit Joshi successfully reached at the peak at about 9:45 a.m. (IST) on 21 May 2013 to commemorate the 50th anniversary.

In 2014, the government of India approved the recruitment of women as combat officers in SSB.

== Role ==
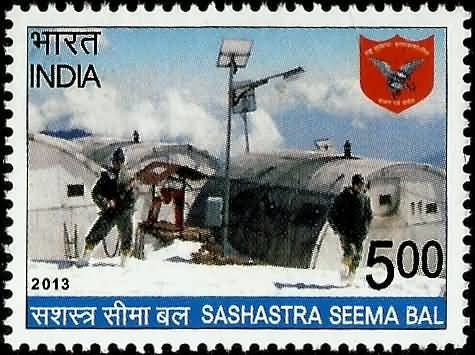
Sashastra Seema Bal postal stamp issued in 2013

The previous role of the Special Service Bureau was to motivate and mobilise India's border population for national security during times of peace as well as war and to promote a sense of security and brotherhood among the population, in furtherance of national integration. Its present-day role consists of preventing cross-border crime and smuggling as well as other anti-national activities.

In pursuit of achieving this mandated task, the SSB has been conferred with certain powers under the Criminal Procedure Code of 1973, the Arms Act of 1959, the NDPS Act of 1985 and the Passport Act of 1967. The Government of India also contemplates conferring additional powers under the Customs Act of 1962.

These powers are to be exercised within a belt of 15 km in the states of Uttarakhand, Uttar Pradesh, Bihar, West Bengal, Sikkim, Assam and Arunachal Pradesh, running along the Indo-Nepal and Indo-Bhutan borders, as well as in any other area of SSB operation.

== Organisation ==
Prior to 2001, the force was known as the Special Service Bureau (SSB). As per its revised role, the uniform wing worked under the operational command of civilian officers. It was in 1985 that a 15% quota of Area Organisers, for promotion to the rank of Deputy Inspector-General, was given to the commandants of the uniform wing. The civil wing worked in the Area of Operations (AOPs) along the Indo-Tibet and Indo-Pakistan border. Recruitment in uniform wing would be from among Indian youth of the border area who have undergone advanced training in guerrilla warfare and also selected by the respective operational commander such as by the Divisional Organiser, Area Organiser, Sub-Area Organiser and Circle Organiser.

The Divisional Organiser was equivalent in rank to that of Inspector-General of Police, specifically earmarked for the respective AOPs to which they belonged and were activated by. The repercussions of the closure of the old role have been debated and deliberated in the defence establishments and now the relevance of the old role of SSB has been realised for the security of the border area, as such a role is likely to be revived.

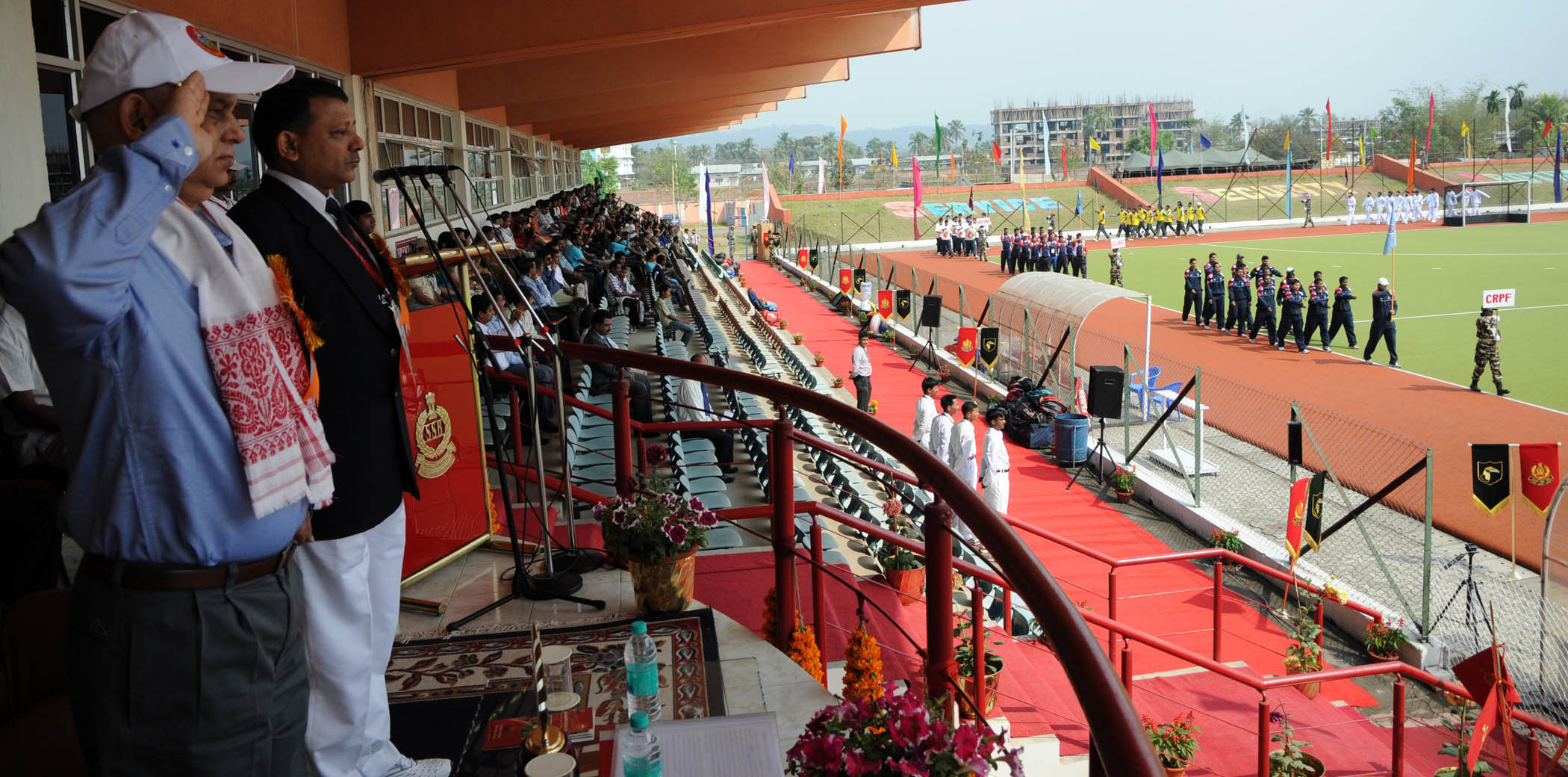
The All India Police Hockey Championship, organized by the Sahastra Seems Bal. Above, Sankar Baruah, the DG of the Assam Police, receives the ceremonial salute.

The highest-level headquarters of the force is Force Headquarters (FHQ), also called the Directorate-General of SSB, located in the Indian capital of New Delhi. Force Headquarters (FHQ) is commanded by an officer of the rank of Director-General. The Director-General is assisted by the Additional Director-General. Various Directorates including Operations and Intelligence, Personnel and Training, Administration, Provisioning and Communication, Medical, as well as others, function under the DG. Each Directorate is headed by an IG and assisted by a DIG and other officers.

Frontier Headquarters (FTR HQ) is commanded by an officer of the rank of Inspector-General (IG), who is placed next in the chain of command after the FHQ. FTR HQ, in turn, exercises command and control over the Sector HQs, commanded a Deputy Inspector-General (DIG). Each SHQ consists of 5-6 battalions and 2-4 Sectors constitute a FTR HQ.

The SSB Battalion, is commanded by an officer of the rank of Commandant and who is assisted by officers of the rank of Second-in-Command, Deputy Commandant, and Assistant Commandant. The battalion is further divided into companies and border out-post (BOP). There are seven companies in a battalion, each company consisting of three border outposts. The company is commanded by an assistant commandant and the BOP is commanded by Sub-Inspectors, with each BOP comprising several border check points.

A battalion consists of 1,000 personnel. As of 2005, SSB had 25 battalions and received government clearance for 20 more battalions, 2 sector HQ and 1 frontier HQ in 2 years. In 2021, SSB received another clearance of raising 12 battalions over the next 4 years. Clearance for 2 more Sectors and one Frontier is also expected.

== Personnel ==
=== Ranks ===
Present rank structure is as follows:

=== Combatised wing ===
Gazetted officers (GOs)

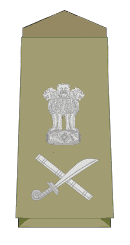
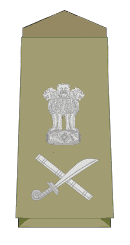
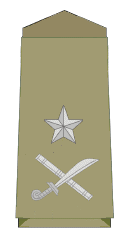
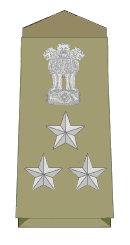
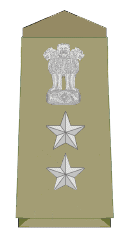
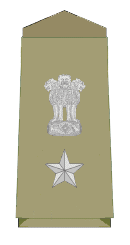
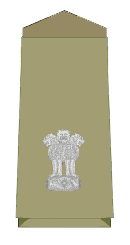
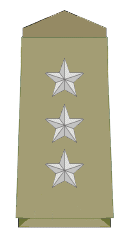
Rank group	General / flag officers				Senior officers			Junior officers
Sashastra Seema Bal
Sashastra Seema Bal	Director-general -	Additional director-general -	Inspector general -	Deputy inspector-general -	Commandant -	Second-in-command -	Deputy commandant -	Assistant commandant -

Non-gazetted officers (NGOs)

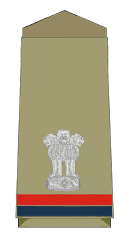
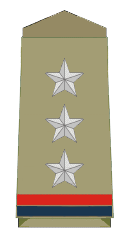
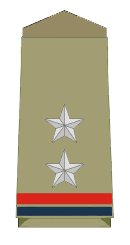
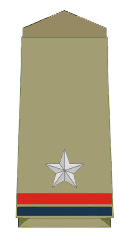
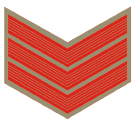
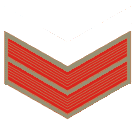
Rank group	Subordinate Officers (SO)				Non commissioned officers (NCO)			Enlisted
Sashastra Seema Bal								No insignia
Sashastra Seema Bal	Subedar major सूबेदार मेजर	Inspector निरीक्षक	Sub inspector उप निरीक्षक	Assistant sub-inspector सहायक उप निरीक्षक	Head constable हवलदार	Naik नायक	Lance naik लांस नायक	Constable कनिष्ठबल

=== Recruitment ===
1. Assistant commandants—Assistant commandants are appointed (as officers are appointed and personnel below officer are recruited in any government organization) through a Competitive Examination conducted by Union Public Service Commission (UPSC) along with assistant ommandants (Comn) recruitment conducted by SSB. Sub Inspectors in GD/TEL/COMN are appointed (as SOs) through a competitive examination conducted by SSC and other special vacancies. Recruitment of constables and Head constables in different branch are also come every year generally.

=== Training centres ===
Both civil and uniformed cadres of SSB are equally trained in various warfare's and other specialised courses such as Guerrilla warfare, Counter-Insurgency, Intelligence, Demolition, Jungle and Snow survival etc. The various training centres within the Force and in the training centres of other organisations/agencies.

=== List of SSB chiefs ===
Before 2001, SSB was one of the four organisations under the Directorate General of Security and was headed by a director. The director reported to the principal director, DGS, who in his turn, reported to DG (security). On shifting of SSB to the Ministry of Home Affairs, the post of principal director, DGS, was shifted alongside as director general, SSB. The post of director, SSB got re-designated as additional DG, SSB. Lists of directors, principal directors and directors general are given below.

Director, Special Service Bureau

Sr No.	Name	From	Till	Remarks
1	Bhola Nath Mullik, IP	15 March 1963	17 December 1963	concurrent with Director, Intelligence Bureau
2	Dhyan Swarup Sharma, IP	17 December 1963	12 October 1964	
(1)	Bhola Nath Mullik, IP	13 October 1964	6 May 1966	concurrent with Director General (Security)
3	Madan Mohan Lal Hooja, IP	May 1966	January 1968	concurrent with Director General (Security). Transferred as Director, Intelligence Bureau
4	Sardar Balbir Singh, IP	January 1968	October 1968	concurrent with Director General (Security). Formerly, founder IG of ITBP
5	Prem Nath Kaul, IAS	24 October 1968	20 April 1972	formerly of Indian Army and Indian Frontier Administrative Service; had worked as Consul-General of India in Lhasa
6	Pitri Sharan Raturi, IPS	28 June 1972	11 July 1977	formerly of the INA. Promoted to Principal Director, DGS
7	Thiruvalanchuly Muthukrishna Ayyar Subramaniam, IPS	21 November 1977	31 March 1979	promoted to Principal Director, DGS
8	Sudarshan Singh Bajwa, IPS	31 March 1979	3 February 1982	promoted to Principal Director, DGS
9	Onkar Singh, IPS	9 February 1982	31 August 1982	promoted to Principal Director, DGS
10	Satish Dutt Pandey, IPS	1 September 1982	1 November 1985	promoted to Director General, CRPF
11	Hari Baboo Johri, IPS	1 November 1985	31 July 1990	promoted to Principal Director, DGS
12	N. Natarajan, IPS	24 October 1990	31 October 1991	promoted to Principal Director, DGS
13	Ghansham Dass Khemani, IPS	1 November 1991	31 August 1993	
14	Bibhuti Bhusan Nandy, IPS	1 September 1993	1 November 1993	later became DG, ITBP and NSA, Mauritius
15	Rajendra Mohan, IPS	2 November 1993	30 September 1996	promoted to Principal Director, DGS
16	Robinder Ohri, RAS	13 November 1996	31 October 1997	originally IPS (15RR), then CRPF (1966)
17	Nachhattar Singh Sandhu, IPS	1 November 1997	25 October 1999	promoted to Principal Director, DGS
18	Ram Prasad Kureel, IPS	29 October 1999	14 January 2001	re-designated as Additional DG, SSB

Director General, Sashastra Seema Bal

Sr No.	Name	From	Till	Remarks
1	Nachhattar Singh Sandhu, IPS	15 January 2001	31 August 2001	
2	Vinod Kumar Malik, IPS	1 September 2001	31 May 2003	later, member, Himachal Pradesh Public Service Commission
3	Bhushan Lal Vohra, IPS	2 June 2003	21 September 2003	concurrent with DG, Civil Defence. Also worked as DGP, Tripura and Manipur.
4	Divakar Prasad, IPS	22 September 2003	31 July 2004	formerly, DG, Civil Defence
5	Himanshu Kumar, IPS	1 August 2004	31 October 2005	
6	Vijay Shankar, IPS	1 November 2005	12 December 2005	concurrent with DG, Civil Defence. Promoted to Director, CBI
7	Jyoti Kumar Sinha, IPS	15 December 2005	7 February 2006	concurrent with DG, CRPF
8	Tilak Kak, IPS	15 December 2005	30 September 2007	
9	Gopal Sharma, IPS	1 October 2007	30 November 2008	formerly, DGP, Jammu and Kashmir
10	M. V. Krishna Rao, IPS	4 December 2008	31 October 2010	formerly, Commissioner of Police, Hyderabad
11	Yudhvir Singh Dadwal, IPS	10 November 2010	31 October 2011	formerly, Commissioner of Police, Delhi
12	Pranay Sahay, IPS	1 November 2011	10 December 2012	formerly, Secretary (Security), Cabinet Secretariat. Later, Director General, CRPF
13	Arun Chaudhary, IPS	10 December 2012	30 April 2014	
14	Arvind Ranjan, IPS	1 May 2014	14 August 2014	concurrent with DG, CISF. Formerly, DG, NSG
15	Banshi Dhar Sharma, IPS	14 August 2014	31 January 2016	
16	Archana Ramasundaram, IPS	3 February 2016	30 September 2017	formerly, Director, NCRB
17	Rajni Kant Mishra, IPS	30 September 2017	30 September 2018	later, DG, BSF
18	Surjeet Singh Deswal, IPS	30 September 2018	11 January 2019	later, DG, ITBP
19	Kumar Rajesh Chandra, IPS	11 January 2019	31 December 2021	formerly, DG, Bureau of Civil Aviation Security
20	Sanjay Arora, IPS	1 January 2022	31 May 2022, in additional charge	concurrent with DG, ITBP
21	Dr. Sujoy Lal Thaosen, IPS	1 June 2022	3 October 2022	transferred as DG, CRPF
22	Anish Dayal Singh, IPS	3 October 2022	2 March 2023	concurrent with DG, ITBP
23	Rashmi Shukla, IPS	3 March 2023	31 December 2023	formerly, Commissioner of Police, Pune; formerly, SDG, CRPF. Transferred as DGP Maharashtra.
(22)	Anish Dayal Singh, IPS	1 January 2024	22 January 2024	transferred as DG, CRPF
24	Daljit Singh Chaudhary, IPS	23 January 2024	28 August 2024	transferred as DG, BSF
25	Amrit Mohan Prasad, IPS	15 September 2024	31 August 2025	transferred as SDG, CRPF
26	Sanjay Singhal, IPS	1 September 2025	Incumbent	transferred as SDG, BSF

== See also ==
- Ministry of Home Affairs
- Central Reserve Police Force
- Indo-Tibetan Border Police
- Central Industrial Security Force
- Border Security Force
- Assam Rifles
- National Security Guard
- Border outpost
