= Anti-Corruption Bureau =

Anti-Corruption Bureau may refer to:

- Anti-Corruption Bureau (Andhra Pradesh), India
- Anti-Corruption Bureau (Argentina)
- Anti-Corruption Bureau (Malawi)
- Anti-Corruption Bureau (Maharashtra), India
- National Anti-Corruption Bureau of Ukraine
