= Medals of Indian Police and Civil Forces =

Honour System of Indian Police and Civil Forces
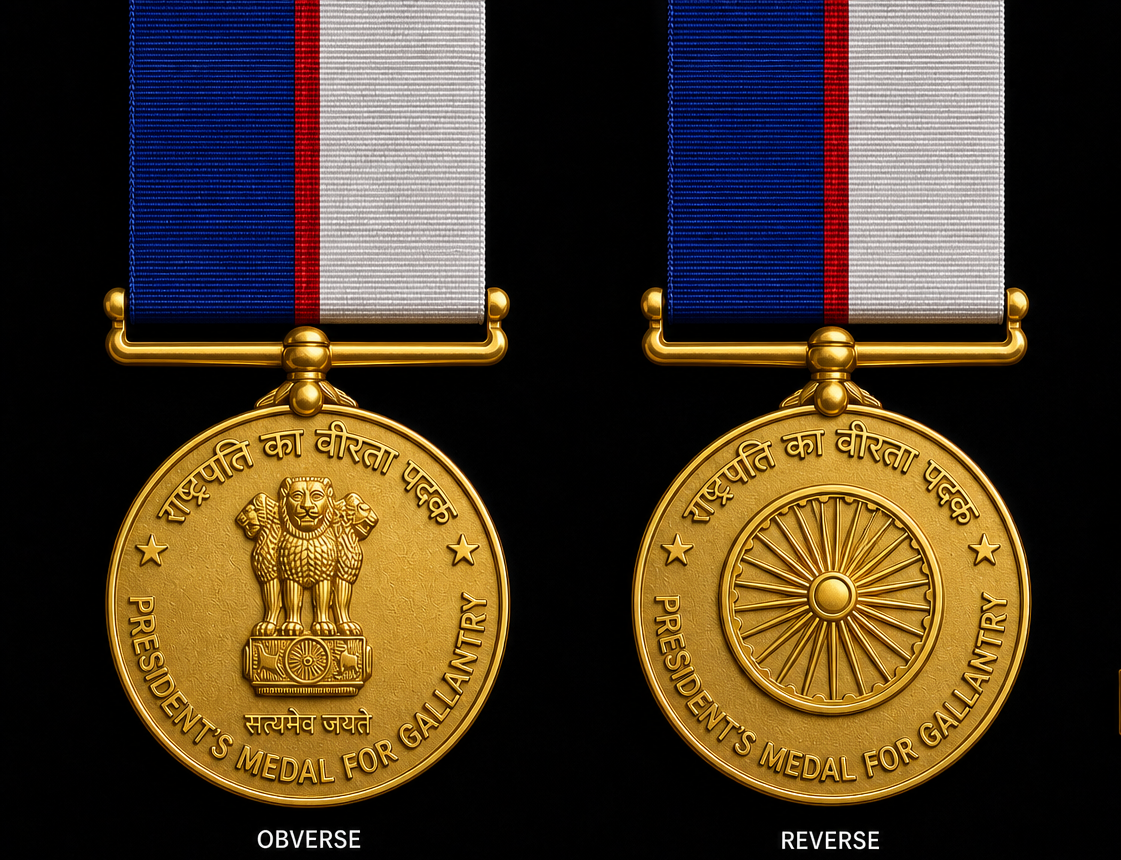
- President's Medal for Gallantry (highest Police, Fire, Correctional and Civil Defence Services medal in India)
- Country: India
- Website: awards.gov.in//

Medals and decorations of Indian police, fire and civil defence forces are honours awarded to personnel of India's police organisations, fire services, and civil defence bodies in recognition of gallantry, distinguished service, and meritorious performance. These decorations form part of the broader Indian honours system and are instituted by the Government of India as well as, in some cases, by state governments. They recognise acts of bravery in the line of duty, exceptional service to public safety, and long or distinguished service in law enforcement and emergency response.

The system includes both national gallantry awards and service-specific decorations. Personnel of state and union territory police forces, members of the Central Armed Police Forces, Fire Services, Correctional Services and Civil Defence Services are eligible for these honours.

Prior to 2023, officers and personnel of fire services and civil defence organisations were recognised through separate medals for gallantry and distinguished service in firefighting, disaster response, and civil protection, however the Ministry of Home Affairs (India), restructured the medals between 2023 and 2024; thereby combining various medals for different services into one definite series.

In India, medals to police, fire, correctional and civil defence services are created and awarded by the Ministry of Home Affairs on the behalf of the President of India. The processing, awarding, and managing service and gallantry medals is done by the Police Medals and Awards (PMA) Cell within the Home Ministry.

== History ==
Until independence, India's honours system, like that of Pakistan and Bangladesh, was fully integrated into that of Great Britain, the colonial ruler.

Some of the medals and decorations awarded to police, fire and other auxiliary services are listed below.

Ribbon	Name
	King's Police Medal for Gallantry
	King's Police Medal for Distinguished Service
	Indian Police Medal for Gallantry
	Indian Police Medal for Meritorious Service

In addition to the regular imperial awards which were, over time, progressively opened up to both Europeans in India and to Asians, the Indian Order of Merit (in both military and civil divisions) and the Indian Distinguished Service Medal were available for bravery, the Order of British India was awarded for military merit, the Kaisar-i-Hind Medal and the various title badges were available for general merit, while the more general King's Police Medal and India-specific police medals for gallantry and meritorious service were used to reward personnel of the police and fire services.

From the date of Independence, almost all these awards, in addition to the Indian orders of knighthood lapsed into immediate obsolescence for India (and, for most of the above, for the empire as a whole).

The knighthood orders included: -

- Most Excellent Order of the Star of India
- The Most Eminent Order of the Indian Empire
- The Imperial Order of the Crown of India

Only the four police medals survived into India's independent honours toolbox. This left newly independent India with a virtual awards vacuum.

=== New Police Medals ===
On 10 March 1951, new police medals were established for India, removing any ambiguity about the ongoing standing of the royal police medals and replacing the odd continuance of the pre-Independence awards. The following medals were established on March 10: -

- President's Police and Fire Services Medal for Gallantry
- Police Medal for Gallantry
- President's Police and Fire Services Medal for Distinguished Service
- Police Medal for Meritorious Service

=== First Order of Precedence ===
On 3 May 1952, a separate and parallel precedence for police and fire services medals was established: -

- President's Police and Fire Services Medal for Gallantry
- Police Medal for Gallantry
- President's Police and Fire Services Medal for Distinguished Service
- Police Medal for Meritorious Service
- Independence Medal 1950 for Police
- All decorations awarded prior to 26 January 1950
- Other awards.

This set the stage for the largely uncoordinated and in-dependent development of civil and military awards within the Republic in the years to come. These separate orders of wearing would not coalesce until 2 January 1959.

=== Later additions ===
On 27 January 1973, the Police (Special Duty) Medal was added to the official order of precedence.

On 7 October 1974, a series of medals paralleling those for the police and fire services were added to reward services by the home guards and civil defence personnel. These were: -

==== Home Guards ====
- President's Home Guards Medal for Gallantry
- Home Guards Medal for Gallantry
- President's Home Guards Medal for Distinguished Service
- Home Guards Medal for Meritorious Service

==== Civil Defence ====
- President's Civil Defence Medal for Gallantry
- Civil Defence Medal for Gallantry
- President's Civil Defence Medal for Distinguished Service
- Civil Defence Medal for Meritorious Service

However, due to constant and often unregulated changes, the medals for these forces have kept changing. While various states have instituted their own medals, the Home Ministry has itself indulged regular creation and alteration of medals. Due to a lack of control (see next section on "Confusion and lack of control over medals"), many personnel have often been seen wearing unauthorised medals and have, in some cases, been repremanded too.

However between 2023 and 2024, the issue was finally addressed when the Home Ministry streamlined various medals into one series. In total, the ministry merged around twenty medals into five. The Home MinistryAs per 2026, the police, fire, correctional and civil defence forces have five medals for meritorious service and gallantry, in addition to service/campaign medals. These are: -

- President's Medal for Gallantry
- Medal for Gallantry
- President's Medal for Dishtinguished Service
- Medal for Meritorious Service
- Kendriya Grihamantri Dakshata Padak
- Other service/campaign medals

== Confusion and lack of control over medals ==
Unlike the Indian Armed Forces and their defined medal structure, medals for police, fire services, home guards and civil defence personnel are neither standardised nor formalised, in many cases.

Take the Garaj Star for instance. The medal is awarded to National Security Guards and Police personnel of who took part in Operation Black Thunder in Punjab. In no other case has a separate medal or star been sanctioned for any active operations against Indian citizens. As per Military historian Rana Chhina, the Ministry of Defence and the armed forces were not in favour of instituting this medal. It was strongly opposed by the armed forces, which rightly argued that as compared to Operation Black Thunder, Operation Blue Star was much bigger operation in terms of degree of opposition, troops employed, and casualties suffered. However, the idea of awarding a medal for Operation Blue Star was turned down at the level of the Chiefs of Staff after taking various considerations, from political to social, into account.

However, the Garaj Star was instituted in spite of the objections of the defence establishment and marked a critical turning point in the manner in which the honours system of the Indian Republic was structured and would henceforth evolve. While earlier medals for wars, armed conflicts and counter-insurgency operations were almost exclusively established by the armed forces, the Home Ministry essentially bulldozed its way through for this medal.

"The progressively feeble military response was blatantly disregarded by an increasingly powerful Home Ministry, which usurped the time-honoured usages of the Indian armed forces and supplanted them as potent symbols of state patronage in the police and paramilitary establishments under its command," adds Rana Chhina.

This arbitrary institution of medals and decorations still continues and has resulted in massive confusion in the awards system for forces under the Home Ministry, i.e., (armed) police, fire and other civil defence forces.

In the case of Police (Special Duty) Medal, unlike accepted norms, subsequent awards of the medal are not indicated by adding a clasp or a bar but instead by adding a new medal altogether. For instance, this can result in a situation wherein a policeman may be wearing the five Police (Special Duty) Medals for serving in Jammu and Kashmir for a cumulative tenure of five years!

On the other hand, a number of medals bear the same ribbon despite having different eligibility criteria. President's Police Medal for Gallantry and Asadharan Aasuchana Kushalta Padak share the same ribbon despite the latter being awarded for gallantry in police duty of all type while the post is awarded specifically for "exceptional performance, indomitable & daring intelligence service." The case is similar with Utkrisht Seva Padak and Kendriya Grihamantri Dakshata Padak, Correctional Service Medal for Meritorious Service and Correctional Service Medal for Gallantry, in addition to other medals as well.

Ribbon	Name
	President's Medal for Gallantry
	Asadharan Aasuchana Kushalta Padak
	Kendriya Grihamantri Dakshata Padak
	Utkrisht Seva Padak
	Correctional Service Medal for Gallantry
	Correctional Service Medal for Meritorious Service
	President's Home Guards and Civil Defence Medal for Gallantry
	President's Home Guards and Civil Defence Medal for Distinguished Service
	Home Guards and Civil Defence Medal for Gallantry
	Home Guards and Civil Defence Medal for Meritorious Service

The confusion extends to Police (Antrik Suraksha Seva) Padak as well. Instituted first in 2000, the medal initially had a ribbon which was three-fourth blue and one-third red. However, the medal was effectively re-instituted in 2018 but with a different ribbon and design without any cancellation of the previous design in the Home Ministry's circular. Incidentally, both the medals were discontinued by the Home Ministry as per a notification on 21 February 2023, to "improve the awards ecosystem." While the eligibility of Ati Utkrisht Seva Medal and Utkrisht Seva Medal were limited to Police personnel only.

There has also been an erratic haste in constituting medals only to either scrap or rename them later. In 2018, the Home Ministry introduced four medals: -

- Union Home Minister's Medal for Excellence in Investigation
- Union Home Minister's Special Operation Medal
- Union Home Minister's Award for Meritorious Service in Forensic Sciences
- Asadharan Aasuchana Kushalta Padak

These medals were awarded till 2024, when they were combined into one medal, the Kendriya Grihamantri Dakshata Padak. However, this was done without a retrospective effect, i.e., personnel are still wearing the older versions of the medal even after a new version has been introduced.

These issues have resulted in various cases where police personnel have worn medals that were not authorised to them. On the other hand, such confusion and the absence of many police medals from India's official order of precedence seriously dents the credibility of India's police and other auxiliary forces as well as their gallant actions.

== Gallantry medals ==
Ribbon	Name
	Ashok Chakra
	Kirti Chakra
	Shaurya Chakra
	President's Medal for Gallantry
	Medal for Gallantry

== Service and campaign medals ==
Ribbon	Name
	Wound Medal
	Sarvottam Jeevan Raksha Padak
	Uttam Jeevan Raksha Padak
	Jeevan Raksha Padak

Decorations awarded only when under the operational command of the regular armed forces

Ribbon	Name
	General Service Medal
	Special Service Medal
	Samar Seva Star
	Poorvi Star
	Paschimi Star
	Raksha Medal
	Sangram Medal
	Operation Vijay Medal
	Operation Parakram Medal

== Distinguished service medals ==
Ribbon	Name
	President's Medal for Distinguished Service
	Medal for Meritorious Service
	Kendriya Grihamantri Dakshata Padak
	Ati Utkrisht Seva Padak(for Police Forces only)
	Utkrisht Seva Padak (for Police Forces only)

== Independence medals ==
Ribbon	Name
	Indian Independence Medal
	Indian Police Independence Medal
	25th Independence Anniversary Medal
	50th Independence Anniversary Medal
	75th Independence Anniversary Medal

== United Nations medals ==
Ribbon	Name
	MONUSCO (Congo)
	UNMIS (Sudan)
	UNMISS (South Sudan)
	MINUSTAH (Haiti)
	UNMIL (Liberia)

(The medals shown here are only of those United Nations missions where Indian Police forces have been deployed.)

== Discontinued medals ==
The following medals have been discontinued by the Government of India at various times. While the Indian Police Medal for Gallantry and Indian Police Medal for Distinguished Service were discontinued in 2004, most of the remaining ones have been abolished between 2023 and 2024 in the restructuring of Police and Civil forces medal.

All the medals are discontinued as per notifications released by the PMA Cell of Ministry of Home Affairs and subsequent notification in The Gazette of India.

Ribbon	Name
	Indian Police Medal for Gallantry
	Indian Police Medal for Distinguished Service
	Police (Special Duty) Medal
	Police (Antrik Suraksha Seva) Padak - J&K State
	Police (Antrik Suraksha Seva) Padak - LWE Region
	Police (Antrik Suraksha Seva) Padak - NE Region
	Prime Minister's Life Saving Medal
	President's Fire Services Medal for Gallantry
	Fire Services Medal for Gallantry
	President's Correctional Service Medal for Gallantry
	Correctional Service Medal for Gallantry
	President's Home Guards and Civil Defence Medal for Gallantry
	Home Guards and Civil Defence Medal for Gallantry
	President's Fire Services Medal for Distinguished Service
	Fire Services Medal for Meritorious Service
	President's Correctional Service Medal for Distinguished Service
	Correctional Service Medal for Meritorious Service
	President's Home Guards and Civil Defence Medal for Distinguished Service
	Home Guards and Civil Defence Medal for Meritorious Service

== See also ==
- Orders, decorations, and medals of India
- Orders, decorations, and medals of British India
- State Armed Police Forces
- Paramilitary forces of India
- Law enforcement in India
- Indian Armed Forces
