= President's Police Medal =

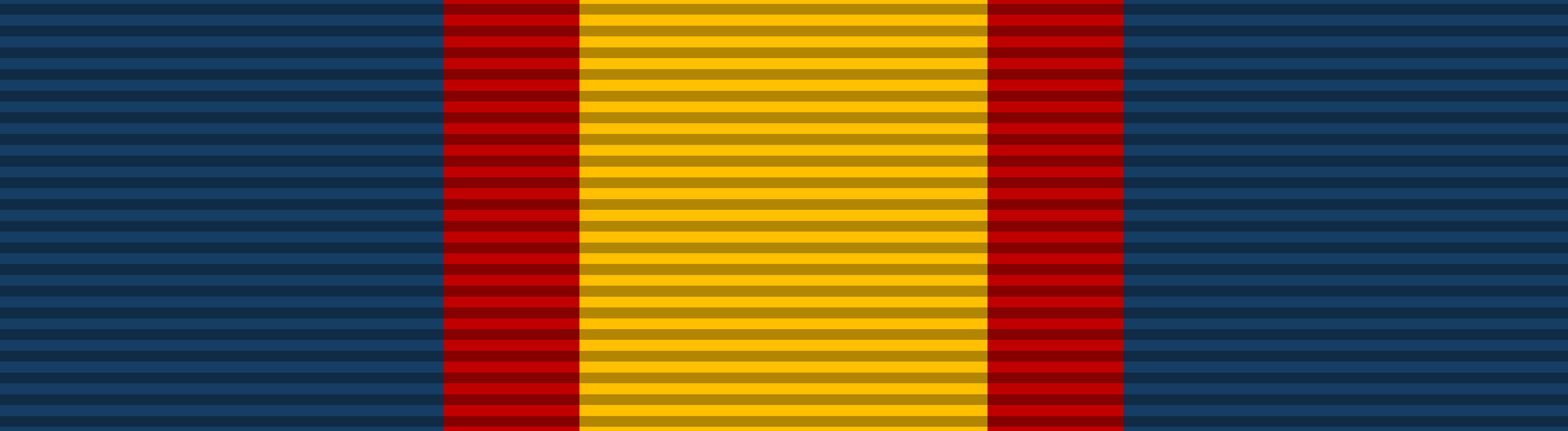
- Ribbon for distinguished service (1951–2023) Ribbon for distinguished service (2023–present)
- Type: Police decoration
- Country: India
- Presented by: the President of India
- Established: 1 March 1951; 75 years ago

Order of Wear
- Next (higher): President's Medal for Gallantry
- Equivalent: President's Tatarakshak Medal for Distinguished Service
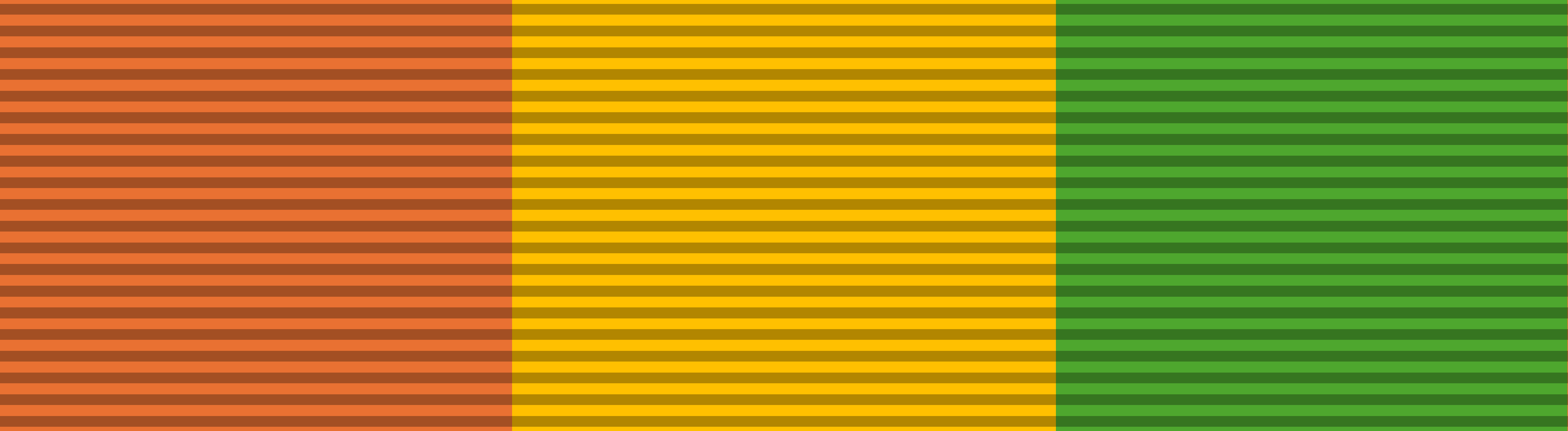
- Next (lower): Medal for Gallantry

The President's Police Medal is a decoration awarded to members of law enforcement in India. Established on 1 March 1951, the medal was originally called the President's Police and Fire Service Medal. The medal is awarded for either gallantry or distinguished service, with the gallantry version of the medal being accorded a higher precedence. The medal is awarded annually on Republic Day and Independence Day.

== History ==
Awards and honours of the Commonwealth realms ceased to be awarded in India after the promulgation of the Constitution of India on 26 January 1950. Upon becoming a republic, it was necessary for India to establish its own honours system. For police, that meant replacing the King's Police and Fire Service Medal and the Indian Police Medal. The President's Police Medal was established 1 March 1951 by the President of India. Originally, the medal was called the President's Police and Fire Service Medal. At the same time a lower ranking decoration was established, the Police Medal. Eligible service for the medals was made retroactive to 26 January 1950.

== Criteria ==
=== Gallantry ===
The President's Police Medal for Gallantry is awarded for, "gallantry in saving life and property, or in preventing crime or arresting criminals." The medal may be awarded to any member of a police service in India, and is awarded without regard to rank or time in service. Recipients of the medal are granted a monthly stipend that is paid to them even in retirement, and upon the recipient's death it continues to be paid to their surviving spouse.

=== Distinguished service ===
The President's Police Medal for Distinguished Service is awarded for long and distinguished service to individuals who have served at least 21 years in the police service or in the central police and security organizations. Individuals must be prior recipients of the Police Medal for Meritorious Service and must have held that medal for at least six years.

== Appearance ==
The Police Medal is made of bronze and is circular in shape, 1 ^{3}/_{8} in (35 mm) in diameter. The obverse of the medal bears the State Emblem of India in the centre with the words POLICE MEDAL above and the state motto, सत्यमेव जयते (Satyameva Jayate) in Devanagri script below. On either side of the medal are two five-pointed stars separating the inscription. The reverse of the medal bears a wreath with the words INDIAN above and POLICE below. In the centre is inscribed either FOR MERITORIOUS SERVICE or FOR GALLANTRY, depending on the conditions of the award. The recipient's name is inscribed on the rim of the medal.

The ribbon of the medal is 1 ^{3}/_{8} in (35 mm) wide in dark blue, with silver edges and a broad central stripe of crimson. Awards presented for gallantry have thin silver stripes splitting the dark blue sections in half.

== See also ==
- Medals of Indian Police and Civil Forces
- Orders, decorations, and medals of India
- Orders, decorations, and medals of British India
- State Armed Police Forces
- Paramilitary forces of India
- Law enforcement in India
- Indian Armed Forces
