= Indian Police Medal =

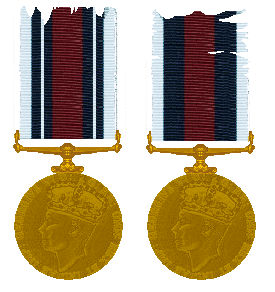
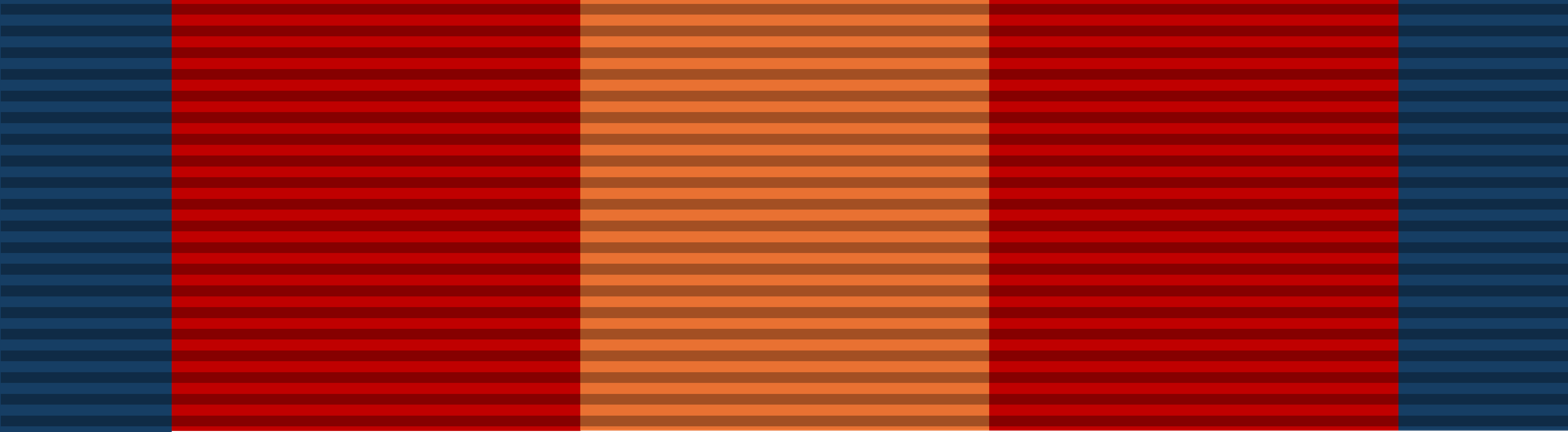
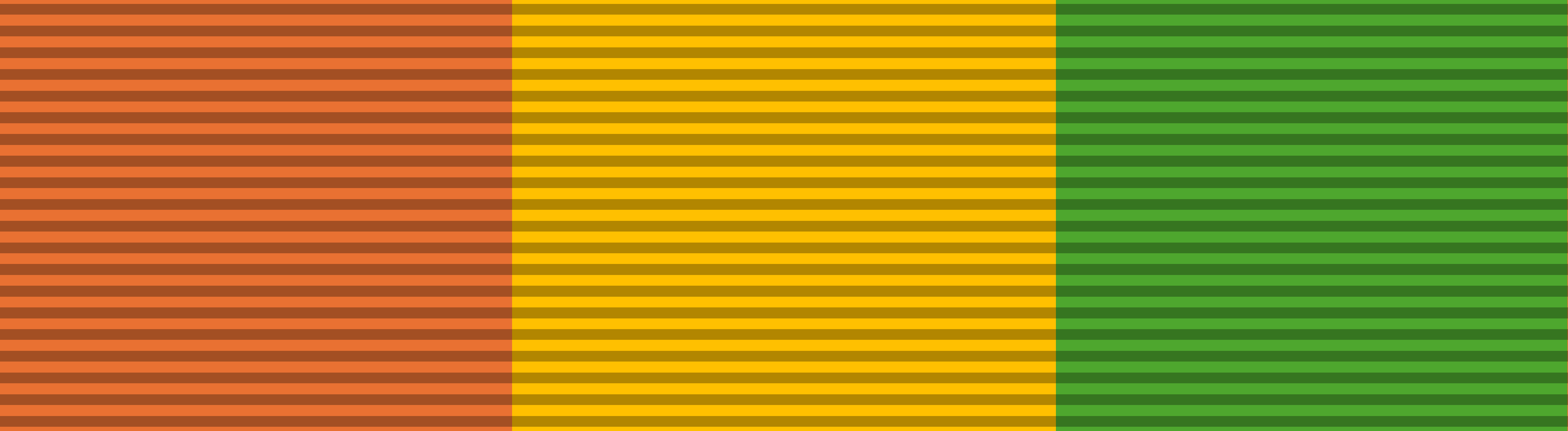
- Ribbon used for meritorious medal 1945-2023 Ribbon used since 2023 - Present Ribbon for gallantry medal 1945–2023 Ribbon used since 2023 - Present
- Type: Police decoration
- Awarded for: Distinguished Conduct (1932–1944); Meritorious Service or Gallantry (1945–1950)
- Presented by: the British Raj; Dominion of India
- Eligibility: Members of the police forces of India
- Status: No longer awarded after 1951, replaced by Police Medal
- Established: 23 February 1932

Order of Wear
- Next (higher): Indian Order of Merit (Civil) (gallantry); Imperial Service Medal (meritorious)
- Next (lower): Ceylon Police Medal for Gallantry (gallantry); Ceylon Police Medal for Merit (meritorious)
- Related: Overseas Territories Police Medal

The Indian Police Medal (IPM) was an award of the British Raj presented to both European and Asian police personnel. Established in 1932, the award was presented for meritorious service and gallantry that was of a lesser degree than what was required for the King's Police Medal.

== History ==
It was decided that further recognition was required for the members of the police forces within India. Already eligible for the King's Police Medal, there were many acts of service and bravery notable enough for recognition, but not meeting the requirements of the King's Police Medal. On 23 February 1932, a royal warrant was promulgated establishing the Indian Police Medal. The medal was meant to recognize both acts of meritorious and noteworthy service, as well as gallantry. The medal was limited to 200 annual awards. A royal warrant in 1942 allowed the Viceroy of India, in exceptional circumstances, to raise the number of awards to 250 in a year. The Indian Police Medal ceased to be awarded after India became a republic. The Indian Police medal was replaced by the Police Medal which was established by the Government of India notification dated 15 March 1951.

== Appearance ==
The Indian Police Medal is round and made of bronze. The obverse bears the effigy of the reigning monarch. The reverse of the medal depicts a wreath around the edge, surmounted by a crown. In the middle are the words FOR GALLANTRY or FOR MERITORIOUS SERVICE depending on the conditions under which the medal was awarded. The first version of the medal bore the inscription FOR DISTINGUISHED CONDUCT.

The suspension and service ribbons of the medal are 1 3/8 inches (35 mm) wide. It is dark blue, with silver edges and a crimson centre stripe. For gallantry awards, the blue sections are split by a thin silver stripe.

== See also ==
- Medals of Indian Police and Civil Forces
- Orders, decorations, and medals of India
- Orders, decorations, and medals of British India
- State Armed Police Forces
- Paramilitary forces of India
- Law enforcement in India
- Indian Armed Forces
