= Kornecki =

Kornecki, Kornicki, Kornetzky, or Kornitzky is a surname. Notable people with the surname include:

- Brigitte Kornetzky (born 1959), Swiss-German indie filmmaker
- Franciszek Kornicki (1916–2017), Polish fighter pilot
- Jean-François Kornetzky (born 1982), French football player
- Mateusz Kornecki (born 1994), Polish handballer
- Nike Kornecki (born 1982), Israeli sailor
- Peter Kornicki (born 1950), English Japanologist
