= FBOP (disambiguation) =

FBOP (Federal Bureau of Prisons) is a US agency responsible for federal prisons.

FBOP may also refer to:

- FBOP Corporation – Illinois-based financial services company
- Floating Border Out Post watercraft of the Border Security Force (Water Wing), India
- Flowery Broken Orange Pekoe, tea leaf grading
