= Director General of the Border Security Force =

Head of the Border Security Force

- Emblem of the Border Security Force

- Flag of the Border Security Force
- Incumbent; Praveen Kumar, IPS since 1 December 2025
- Border Security Force
- Reports to: Minister of Home Affairs
- Seat: Lodhi Road, New Delhi
- Appointer: The Union Government; (with Appointments Committee of the Cabinet's consent)
- Term length: At the pleasure of the government
- Constituting instrument: Border Security Force Act, 1968
- Formation: 1 December 1965; 60 years ago
- First holder: Khusro Faramurz Rustamji, IP
- Salary: ₹250,000 (US$2,600) per month under Pay level 17
- Website: www.bsf.gov.in

The Director General of the Border Security Force (DG BSF) is the head of the Border Security Force (BSF), an Indian paramillitary wing under the Central Armed Police Forces (CAPF). The role of the director general is to oversee the day-to-day operations of the patrolling the borders with Pakistan and Bangladesh, and the activities of the sanctioned 2,70,000 personnels. The director reports to the Minister of Home Affairs.

== Background ==
In the wake of Indo-Pakistani war of 1965 and lack of inadequecy of state armed police in copying the armed aggression, the BSF was established in 1965. Later the Border Security Force Act, 1968 passed in Indian Parliament.

== Term of office ==
The director general of BSF is appointed by the Union Government, through Appointments Committee of the Cabinet (ACC). The ACC consists of the Prime Minister and the Home Minister of India. The director general can serve at the pleasure of the government but must retire at the age of 60. However, their term can be extended for up to two years. The director general must be a senior Indian Police Service officer in the rank of director general of police (DGP).

== List of the director generals ==
No.	Name of the DG	Term start	Term end	Duration of service
1.	Khusro Faramurz Rustamji	21 July 1965	30 September 1974	9 years, 71 days
2.	Ashwini Kumar	1 October 1974	31 December 1978	4 years, 91 days
3.	Sharawan Tandon	1 January 1979	30 November 1980	1 year, 334 days
4.	K. Rama Murti	1 December 1980	31 August 1982	1 year, 273 days
5.	Birbal Nath	1 September 1982	30 September 1984	2 years, 29 days
6.	M. C. Misra	1 October 1984	31 July 1987	2 years, 303 days
7.	H. P. Bhatnagar	1 August 1987	31 July 1990	2 years, 364 days
8.	T. Ananthachary	1 August 1990	31 May 1993	2 years, 303 days
9.	Prakash Singh	9 June 1993	31 January 1994	236 days
10.	D. K. Arya	1 February 1994	3 December 1995	1 year, 305 days
11.	Arun Bhagat	4 December 1995	2 October 1996	303 days
12.	A. K. Tandon	2 October 1996	4 December 1997	1 year, 63 days
13.	E. N. Rammohan	4 December 1997	30 November 2000	2 years, 362 days
14.	Gurbachan Singh Jagat	30 November 2000	30 June 2002	1 year, 212 days
15.	Ajay Raj Sharma	1 July 2002	31 December 2004	2 years, 183 days
16.	Ranjit Shekhar Mooshahary	31 December 2004	26 February 2006	1 year, 57 days
17.	A. K. Mitra	27 February 2006	30 September 2008	2 years, 216 days
18.	M. L. Kumawat	1 October 2008	31 July 2009	303 days
19.	Raman Srivastava	1 August 2009	31 October 2011	2 years, 91 days
20.	U. K. Bansal	1 November 2011	30 November 2012	1 year, 29 days
21.	Subhash Joshi	19 December 2012	28 February 2014	1 year, 71 days
22.	D. K. Pathak	8 March 2014	29 February 2016	1 year, 358 days
23.	K. K. Sharma	1 March 2016	30 September 2018	2 years, 213 days
24.	Rajni Kant Mishra	1 October 2018	31 August 2019	334 days
25.	V. K. Johri	1 September 2019	10 March 2020	191 days
26.	Surjeet Singh Deswal	11 March 2020	17 August 2020	159 days
27.	Rakesh Asthana	18 August 2020	28 July 2021	344 days
(26)	Surjeet Singh Deswal	28 July 2021	31 August 2021	34 days
28.	Pankaj Kumar Singh	1 September 2021	31 December 2022	1 year, 121 days
29.	Sujoy Lal Thaosen	1 January 2023	14 June 2023	164 days
30.	Nitin Agarwal	15 June 2023	31 July 2024	1 year, 46 days
31.	Daljit Singh Chaudhary	1 August 2024	30 November 2025	1 year, 121 days
32.	Praveen Kumar	1 December 2025	Incumbent	325 days
