= Amit Goswamy =

Indian film director

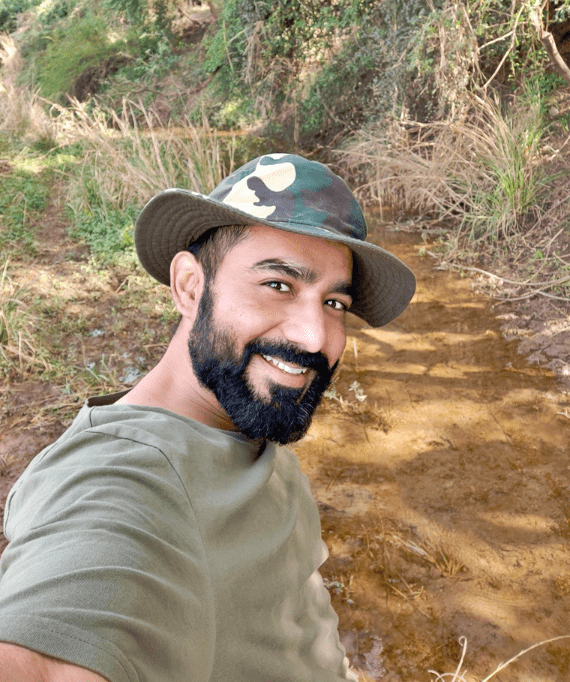
- Citizenship: Indian
- Education: Masters in Wildlife Science
- Alma mater: Wildlife Institute of India
- Occupation(s): Film director Film writer
- Years active: 2017–present
- Notable work: The Last Tribe, Wild Vietnam

Amit Goswamy is an Indian film director, writer and conservationist. Goswamy is known for his wildlife documentary films based on India's lesser- known wildlife ecosystems outside protected areas.

== Early life and education ==
Goswamy did Masters in Wildlife Science from the Wildlife Institute of India. His first documentary film was based on his research work in Ranthambore which became his debut film, Chronicles of a Wildlifer, which was later telecasted on Doordarshan (DD National). also he won accolades at several Indian environmental film festivals, including the Tigerland India Film Festival and Kirloskar Vasundhara International Film Festival.

He served as an Assistant Commandant in the Border Security Force from 2011 to 2018, working in counter-insurgency and border security operations. During his service, he developed an interest in documenting India's lesser-known ecosystems, especially those outside protected areas. After leaving the BSF, Goswamy transitioned into wildlife filmmaking. His work highlights the lives of species and communities living at the margins of protected landscapes, particularly along political borders and in human-dominated regions.

His last documentary, Living with Border Security Force (2025), explores thriving biodiversity along the Indo–Pakistan border and has been covered by The Times of India for its unique portrayal of human–wildlife coexistence in militarized landscapes.

His work, focuses on overlooked stories of conservation beyond protected areas—highlighting community-led efforts, cultural stewardship, and wildlife resilience in India's most unexpected places. His storytelling is known for its unique combination of scientific training and frontline experience. Coexistence of humans and wildlife outside protected areas and Conservation in conflict or militarized landscapes.

Living with Border Security (2025)

Released on World Environment Day 2025, this documentary showcases flourishing biodiversity along the Indo–Pakistan border in Rajasthan. It features animals such as the blackbuck, chinkara and desert monitor lizard, as well as community conservation efforts by the Bishnoi people and wildlife-friendly practices adopted by BSF personnel.

== Filmography ==
Year	Film	Director	Writer	Film Festivals	Type	Network
2017	Chronicles of a Wildlifer	Yes	Yes	Wildlife Conservation Film Festival (New York, USA)	Documentary	Doordarshan (DD National)
2018	BSF Academy Film	Yes			Documentary	Border Security Force, India
2020	The Corruption Cycle	Yes	Yes	Tigerland India Film Festival, (Bhopal, India)	PSA	Wildlife Moments India
2020	The Last Tribe	Yes	Yes	India International Centre, (New Delhi) (Quotes from the Earth Film Festival)	Feature	
2022	Blackbuck National Park	Yes	Yes		Documentary	Air India (In-Flight Entertainment)
2022	Magical Melghat	Yes	Yes		Feature	
2024	Wild Vietnam	Yes	Yes	Combodia International Film Festival, (Combodia)	Feature	Wildlife Moments India
2025	Gir Lions: The Pride of Gujarat	Yes	Yes		Feature	Wildlife Moments India
2025	Living with Border Security Force	Yes	Yes		Feature	

== Awards ==
- 2017-Kirloskar Vasundhara International Film Festival for Chronicles of a Wildlifer.
- 2017- Tigerland India Film Festiva award for Chronicles of a Wildlifer.
- 2020 -Tigerland India Film Festival for The Corruption Cycle.
- 2020- Global Taj International Film Festival for The Last Tribe, in Agra.
- 2021- Chambal International Film Festival for The Last Tribe.
- 2024- Chambal International Film Fest, Best Director for Wild Vietnam.
