= Tigerland India Film Festival =

Indian film festival

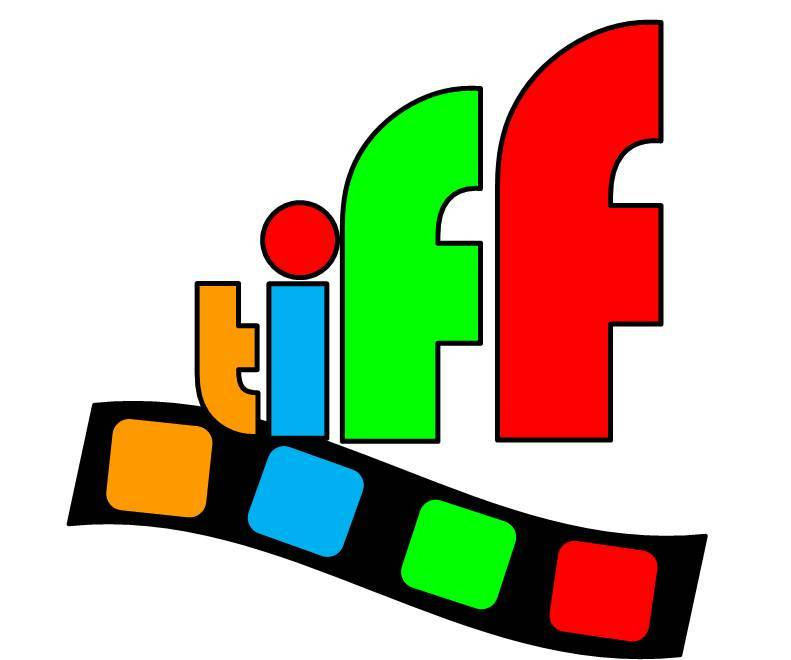
The logo of Tigerland India Film Festival; all four primary colours in one logo symbolise the need for contribution of everyone for the success of conservation of our natural wealth

Tigerland India Film Festival (TIFF) is an environmental and wildlife film festival based in India.

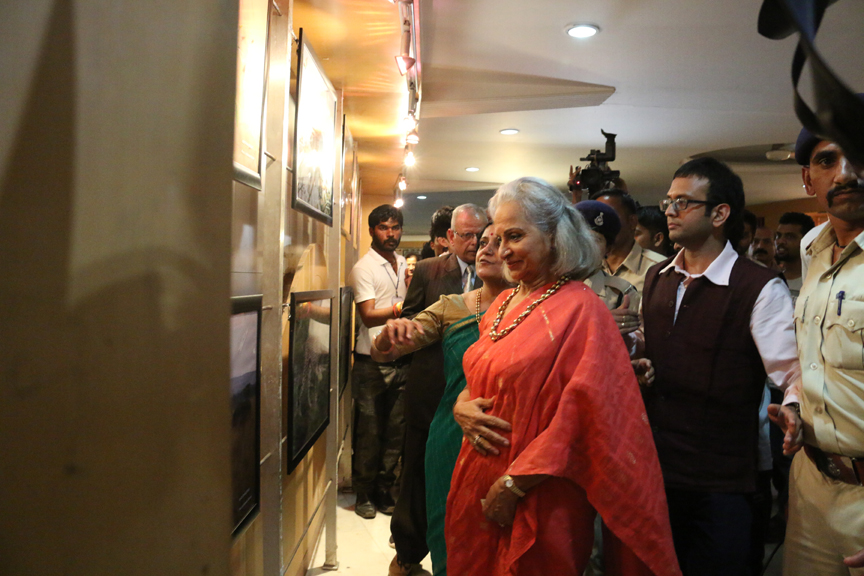
Waheeda Rehman at the exhibition of her wildlife photographs organised under TIFF 2015

It is organized by a non-profit organization 'Society for Tigerland Conservation' and the aim of the festival is to spread awareness on wildlife conservation through visual media.

== About TIFF ==
TIFF was founded in 2014. The Director and CEO of TIFF Abhinandan Shukla describes it as “a celebration of nature and wildlife” and “an annual event to honour commendable work in environmental and wildlife film-making aimed at creating conservation awareness”.

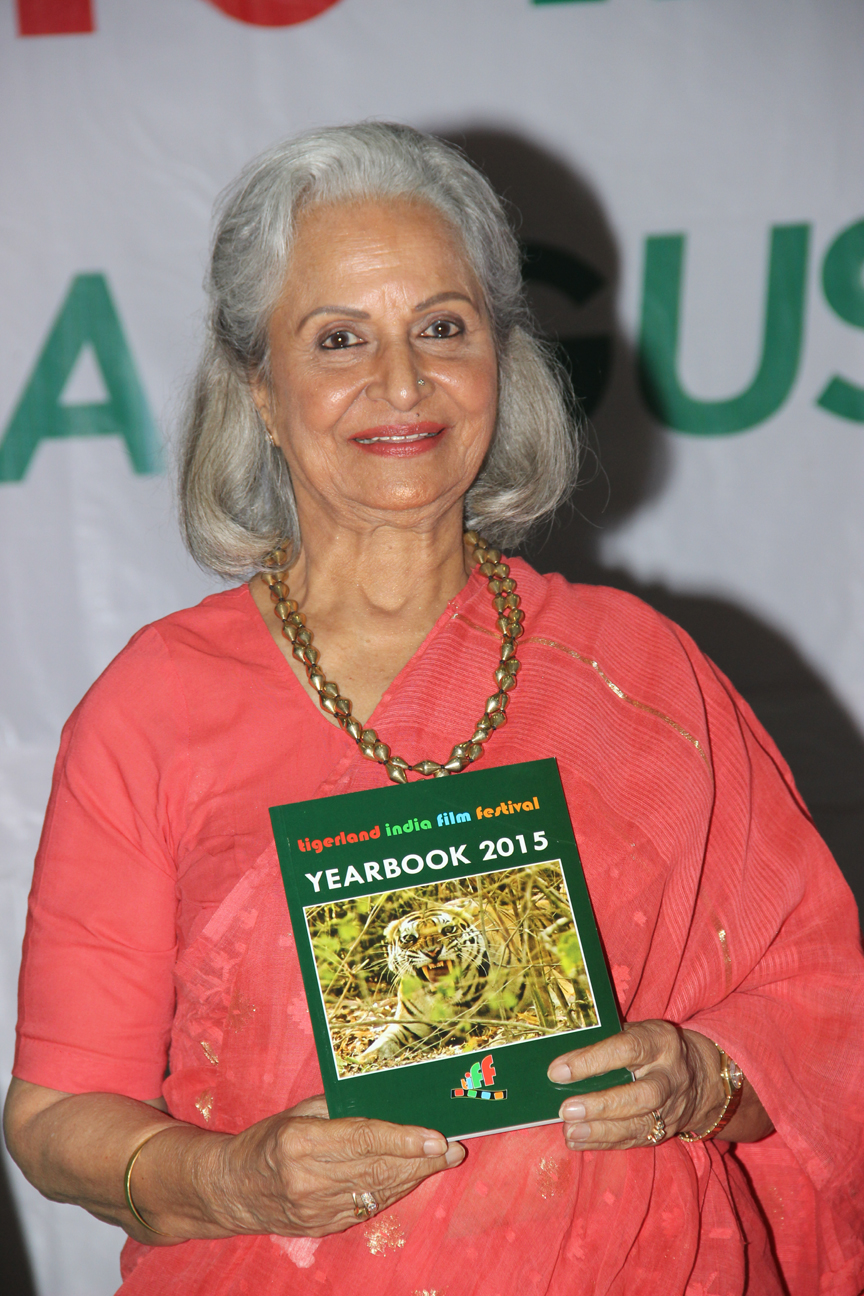
Waheeda Rehman releases the 'TIFF 2015 Yearbook'. The book has one of her tiger clicks shot in Madhya Pradesh on the cover-page.

The festival is open to all and invites entries under various competitive categories mostly related to visual media. These include films, documentaries, short films, photographs, paintings and sketches. Recently, few more categories have been added. Winners are awarded at a grand function organized at the end of the annual fest.

== TIFF 2015: The First Edition ==
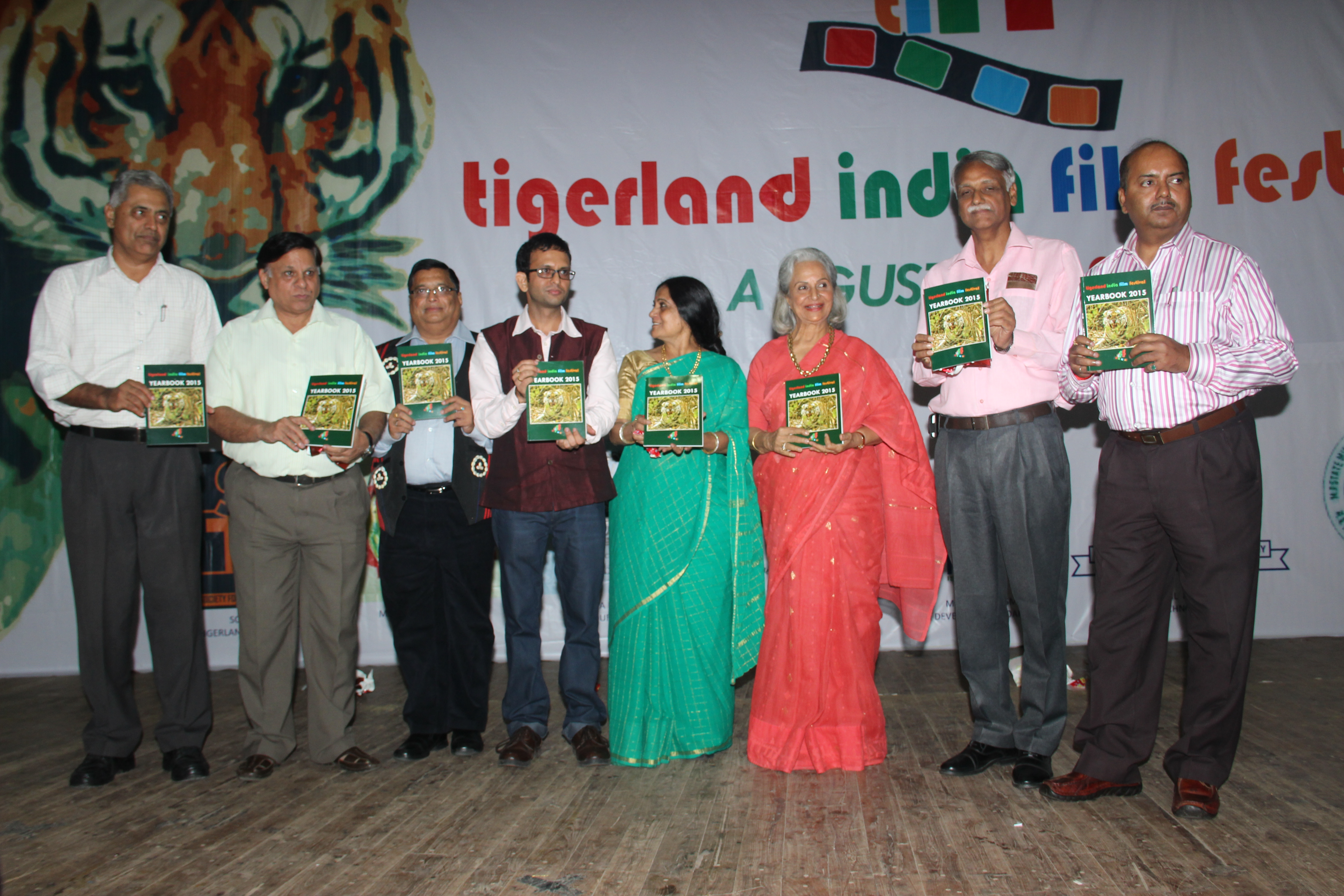
Dignitaries release the 'TIFF 2015 Yearbook' (L-R: Vinay Varman, Animesha Shukla, M Lokeswara Rao, Abhinandan Shukla, Bhawana Somaaya, Waheeda Rehman, Suhas Kumar, Ravi Srivastava)

The first edition of the Tigerland India Film Festival was held at Bhopal in Madhya Pradesh (India) on August 26–27, 2015. The Bollywood legend Waheeda Rehman attended the festival and gave away the prizes. Renowned film-critic and writer Bhawana Somaaya, who is also an advisor with TIFF, presided over the event and delivered the inaugural address.

The event was attended by top bureaucrats from forest department besides wildlife experts, photographers, amateur filmmakers, school and college students, and young wildlife-lovers. Top forest officer and PCCF of Madhya Pradesh Shri Narendra Kumar gave his lecture as the Chief Guest of TIFF 2015. Chief Wildlife Warden Ravi Srivastava, APCCF Vinay Varman, PCCF Animesh Shukla, PCCF Suhas Kumar and MPCoST DG Pramod K Verma attended as special guests. On this occasion 'TIFF 2015 Yearbook' was also released by the dignitaries present. The yearbook cover was a photograph of a tigress clicked by Waheeda Rehman in a national park of Madhya Pradesh.

The first Tigerland India Biodiversity Conservation Award was awarded to Nagaland Principal Chief Conservator of Forests and Head of Forest Force M Lokeswara Rao.

== Wildlife Photo-exhibition of Waheeda Rehman ==
The highlight of TIFF 2015 was the 'first-ever' wildlife photo exhibition of the wildlife clicks of Waheeda Rehman. About 40 photographs mainly from India and Africa were displayed here. The Times of India covering the event in its main edition wrote, "Waheeda's best-kept secret out: She loves cameras & wields them in wild". The Pioneer wrote, "The visitors were awestruck with the wonderful pictures put up by her. Majorly students who have an interest in photography are visiting the exhibition. As the pictures showcase wildlife, the visitors got a chance to watch the jungles through this exhibition. This exhibition is a delicacy in extravagance to watch the pictures of animals in their most unseen positions.”

The first 'Tigerland India Biodiversity Conservation Award' or TIBCA 2015 was also given on this occasion. PCCF Nagaland Shri M Lokeswara Rao received the award from Waheeda Rehman for his commendable work in the conservation of migratory bird Amur Falcon. TIBCA is an annual award given for outstanding contribution in the field of conservation of biodiversity. The award consists of a certificate and trophy along with a cash prize.

== Subsequent Editions of TIFF ==
After the first episode in 2015, the festival event has been organised thrice more, that is, in 2017, 2019 and 2020 (online). TIFF 2017 was organised on December 9, 2017, with international wildlife filmmaker and conservationist Mike Pandey present as the Chief Guest. The audience was enthralled by several wildlife documentaries, including those by Mike Pandey, screened at the venue.

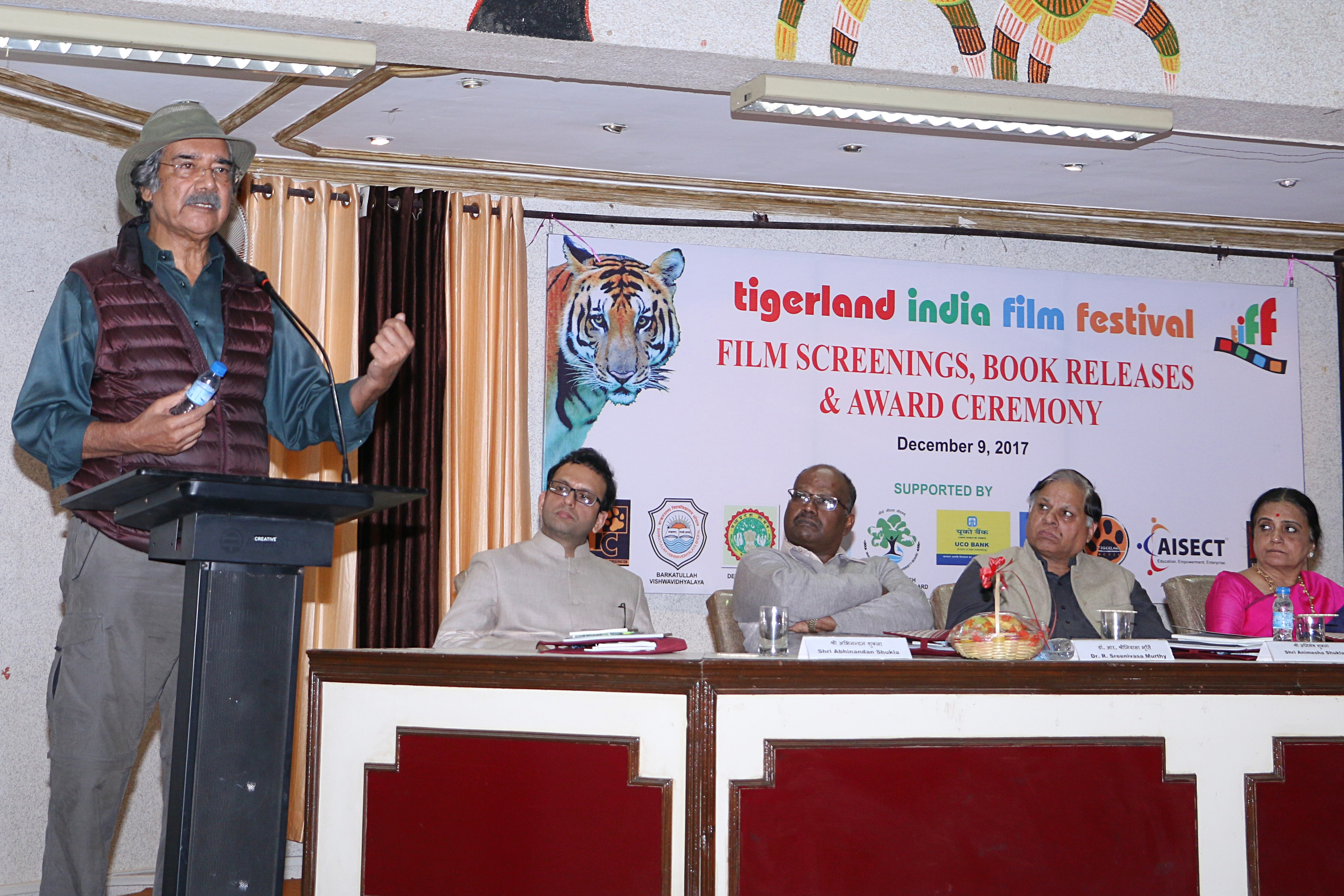
Internationally acclaimed filmmaker and Green Oscar winner Mike Pandey addresses the gathering at TIFF 2017

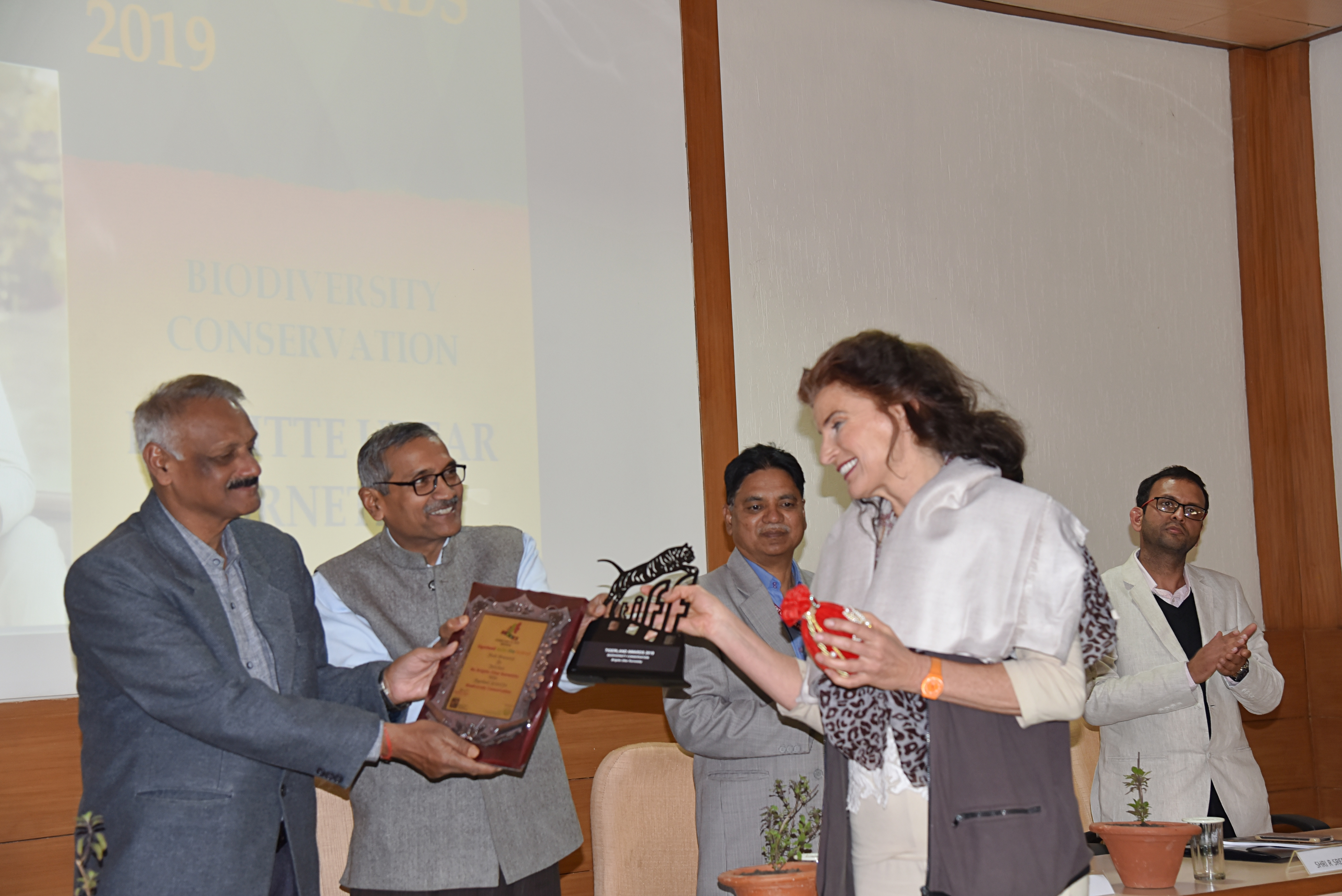
Renowned elephant conservationist Brigitte Uttar Kornetzky receives TIBCA 2017 from PCCF Madhya Pradesh and others

In TIFF 2019, famous elephant conservationist and Swiss filmmaker Brigitte Kornetzky graced the event, which was held at Bhopal on February 16–17, 2019. Brigitte's flagship film 'Where The Elephant Sleeps' was screened at the festival besides many other documentaries. TIFF 2020, earlier scheduled for March 2020, was postponed indefinitely due to COVID-19 pandemic. Finally, the festival was concluded through an online exhibition of Waheeda Rehman, while the award money was sent to the awardees through bank transfers. The Yearbook published to mark this occasion was sent to all concerned by post, and got officially released by Waheeda Rehman at Mumbai and MK Ranjitsinh Jhala at New Delhi, besides others. The next episode of TIFF is expected by the end of 2022, depending on the emerging COVID-19 situation. The entries to various competitive categories are open till June 30, 2022.

== Competitive Categories under TIFF ==
The Tigerland Awards are currently given under the following ten categories. Entries can be sent online through the official website of the festival.

1. Documentary Film
2. Short Documentary Film
3. Short Film
4. Promotional Film on Conservation
5. Wild Click
6. Wild Art
7. Wild Poster
8. Wild Comics
9. Poetry
10. Caption

The festival also confers three special awards for individuals who have done commendable work in the field of conservation, and related areas. These are: Tigerland India Biodiversity Conservation Award, Tigerland Epitome of Courage Award, Tigerland Eco-warrior Award
