= Indo-Tibetan Border Police (Water Wing) =

Indo-Tibetan Border Police (Water Wing) is a special unit of Indo-Tibetan Border Police of India.

The Water Wing of ITBP was established on 30 August 2011, with an initial strength over 125 personnel led by a commandant. It is responsible for patrolling riverine borders of Himalayan regions. This includes Pangong Tso Lake, Chang Chenmo River, Shyok River and Indus River in Leh district, and Brahmaputra river in Arunachal Pradesh. It offer logistical assistance to BoPs stationed there, aid in disaster management during water-related emergencies, and train ITBP soldiers in water-based operations. Its headquarters is at Tezpur, Assam. The Brahmaputra River, which flows here, offers a good site for its training.

== See also ==
- Border Security Force (Water Wing)
