= Imagine, the Sky =

2011 Swiss–Sierra Leonean documentary film

- Directed by: Brigitte Kornetzky
- Written by: Brigitte Kornetzky
- Produced by: Brigitte Kornetzky
- Starring: Matilda Bangs; Hawa Momoh; John Mangura; Mussu Suray; Regina Sesay; John George
- Cinematography: Brigitte Kornetzky
- Edited by: Brigitte Kornetzky
- Music by: Brigitte Kornetzky
- Distributed by: MagpieDream Pictures
- Release date: 31 January 2011
- Running time: 83 min.
- Country: Sierra Leone
- Language: English

Imagine, the Sky, is a 2011 Swiss-Sierra Leonean documentary drama film directed and produced by Brigitte Kornetzky for MagpieDream Pictures as an independent film. The film stars Matilda Bangs in lead role along with Hawa Momoh, John Mangura, Mussu Suray, Regina Sesay and John George.

The documentary deals with life of pupils at the Milton Margai School for the Blind in Freetown, Sierra Leone, West Africa. In the film, she took part in seven different roles other than director: producer, editor, writer, cinematographer, sound editor, art director and composer. During the making of documentary, she helped the people in Sierra Leone through her co-founded organization: 'A Grain of Change'. The film had its premier on 31 January 2011 at 40th Rotterdam International Film Festival. The film received critical acclaim and screened at several film festivals including, 27th Warsaw Film Festival and International Human Rights Festival in Albania.

The film was distributed worldwide by MagpieDream Pictures.

== Cast ==
- Matilda Bangs
- Hawa Momoh
- John Mangura
- Mussu Suray
- Regina Sesay
- John George
