= Rahul Rasgotra =

Indian police officer

Director General of Indo-Tibetan Border Police
- In office 1 January 2024 – 30 September 2025
- Preceded by: Anish Dayal Singh
- Succeeded by: Praveen Kumar

Personal details
- Born: 28 September 1965 (age 61) Mumbai, India
- Education: Delhi University
- Occupation: IPS officer
- Profession: Civil servant
- Awards: Indian Police Medal awarded by the central government for Meritorious Service President's Police Medal for Distinguished Service

Rahul Rasgotra (born 28 September 1965) is a retired 1989-batch Indian Police Service (IPS) officer from Manipur cadre who served as the Director General of the Indo-Tibetan Border Police of India from 28 December 2023 till 30 September 2025.

== Early life and education ==
Rasgotra was born on 28 September 1965 in Mumbai, India.

Rasgotra attended the Hindu College at the Delhi University and earned a B.A (Hons) in economics. He also obtained a diploma in public administration from Harvard University.

== Career ==
He spent nearly three decades at the Intelligence Bureau, working his way up to the rank of Special Director. He served as the Director General, Indo-Tibetan Border Police from 28 December 2023 until his retirement on 30 September 2025.
