= Praveen Kumar (police officer) =

Indian IPS officer

Director General of Border Security Force
- Incumbent
- Assumed office 1 December 2025
- Preceded by: Daljit Singh Chaudhary

Director General of Indo-Tibetan Border Police
- In office 1 October 2025 – 14 January 2025
- Preceded by: Rahul Rasgotra
- Succeeded by: Shatrujeet Singh Kapoor

Personal details
- Born: 5 September 1970 (age 56)
- Occupation: IPS
- Police career
- Allegiance: India
- Department: West Bengal Police; Indo-Tibetan Border Police; Border Security Force
- Service years: 1993 - present
- Rank: Director General

Praveen Kumar (born 5 September 1970) is an IPS officer (1993 Batch) of the West Bengal cadre. He has been serving as the Director General (DG) of the Border Security Force since 1 December 2025 and has served as the former Director General of Indo-Tibetan Border Police .
