= Border Security Force =

Indian border force for Indo-Pakistan and Indo-Bangladesh Borders

Border Security Force Sīmā Surakṣā Bala
- Emblem of the Border Security Force

- Flag of the Border Security Force
- Abbreviation: BSF
- Motto: "जीवन पर्यन्त कर्तव्य"; Jīvana Paryanta Kartavya ISO transl. "Duty Unto Death"

Agency overview
- Formed: 1 December 1965; 60 years ago
- Employees: 290,000 active personnel
- Annual budget: ₹29,567.64 crore (US$3.2 billion) (2026–27)

Jurisdictional structure
- Federal agency: Republic of India
- Operations jurisdiction: Republic of India
- Governing body: Ministry of Home Affairs
- Constituting instrument: Border Security Force Act, 1968
- General nature: Federal law enforcement
- Specialist jurisdiction: National border patrol, security, integrity

Operational structure
- Headquarters: New Delhi
- Minister responsible: Amit Shah, Minister of Home Affairs
- Agency executive: Praveen Kumar, IPS, Director General

Website
- www.bsf.gov.in

The Border Security Force (BSF) is a central armed police force under the Ministry of Home Affairs. It is responsible for guarding India's borders with Pakistan and Bangladesh. It was formed in the wake of the Indo-Pak War of 1965 to ensure the security of India's borders and for related matters.

The BSF has grown from 25 battalions in 1965, to 193 battalions with a sanctioned strength of 270,000 personnel including an expanding air wing, water wing, an artillery regiment and specialised units. It is currently the world's largest border security force. BSF has been termed the First Line of Defence of Indian territories.

== History ==
After India's independence in 1947, the protection of its international boundaries was the responsibility of the local police in each border state, with little inter-state coordination. However, during the Indo-Pakistani War of 1965, Pakistan attacked Sardar Post, Char Bet, and Beria Bet on 9 April 1965 in Kutch. This attack exposed the inadequacy of the State Armed Police in coping with armed aggression. After the war, the government therefore created the Border Security Force as a unified central agency with the specific mandate of guarding India's international borders. This brought greater cohesion to border security. K F Rustamji of the Indian Police Service (IPS), was the first Director General of the BSF. Since it was a new force, the officers had to be deputed or inducted from outside to fill the various vacancies at different levels until the force's own cadre matured sufficiently. For this reason, emergency commissioned officers and SS officers of the Indian Army were inducted in large numbers into the force, along with IPS officers who were deputed to the force for high-level appointments.

The BSF's capabilities were used in the Indo-Pakistani War of 1971 against Pakistani forces in areas where the Regular Forces were thinly spread. BSF troops took part in several operations, including the famous Battle of Longewala. In fact, for the BSF the war on the eastern front had started well before the war actually broke out in December 1971. BSF had trained, supported and formed part of Mukti Bahini and had entered erstwhile East Pakistan before the actual hostilities broke out. The BSF played a very important role in the Liberation of Bangladesh, which Indira Gandhi and Sheikh Mujibur Rehman had also acknowledged.

K.F. Rustamji, IPS, was appointed as the first Director General of Border Security Force from 22 July 1965, to 30 September 1972, and the current DG is Praveen Kumar, IPS, since 15 January 2026.

=== Engagements ===
- Indo-Pakistani War of 1971
- Operation Blue Star
- Operation Black Thunder
- Insurgency in Punjab
- Insurgency in Jammu and Kashmir
- Operation Vijay – Kargil War
- 2001 Bangladeshi-Indian border skirmishes
- 2001–2002 Operation Parakram – India-Pakistan Standoff
- 2013 India-Pakistan Border skirmishes
- 2014–15 India–Pakistan border skirmishes
- 2016–2018 India–Pakistan border skirmishes
- 2019 India–Pakistan border skirmishes
- 2025 India–Pakistan standoff

== Roles ==
During peacetime

- Border guarding and security.
- Prevention of trans-border crimes, unauthorized entry into or exit from the territory of India.
- Prevention of smuggling and any other illegal activities on the border.
- Anti-infiltration duties.
- Collection of trans-border intelligence.
- To promote a sense of security among the people living in the border areas.

During war time

- Holding ground in assigned sectors.
- Limited aggressive action against irregular forces of the enemy.
- Maintenance of law and order in enemy territory administered under the Army's control.
- Acting as guides to the Army in border areas.
- Assistance in control of refugees.
- Provision of escorts.
- Performing special tasks connected with intelligence including cross-border raids.
- Replenishing manpower.

The BSF is also employed for internal security duties and other law and order duties on the requisition of the State Government. Being a Central Armed Police Force, it can be entrusted with policing duties at any place apart from its mandate. Although originally charged with guarding India's external boundaries, the BSF in the 1990s was also given the task of counter-insurgency and counter-terrorism operations in Jammu and Kashmir, Punjab, and the Northeastern Seven Sister States. While in Punjab, the BSF took part in operations like Blue Star, Black Thunder 1 & 2. However, when the insurgency in Jammu and Kashmir broke out in 1989, it moved towards the state and handed over the operations in Punjab to CRPF and local police. In Jammu and Kashmir, the state police and the thinly-deployed Central Reserve Police Force (CRPF) struggled to cope with the torturous violence, so it was deployed to combat these.

In Jammu and Kashmir, the BSF initially suffered casualties from terrorist attacks but later saw successes. During the initial years, terrorist activity had even reached Jammu and parts of Northern Punjab and Himachal Pradesh. However, it was only due to the successful operations by BSF that by the late 1990s, their area of activity had been restricted only to the valley. BSF was also successful in setting up a robust HUMINT network. From arresting Maulana Masood Azhar, Bitta Karate, Yasin Malik, the BSF is also credited for killing Ghazi Baba - the chief of Jaish-e-Mohammed and the mastermind of the 2001 Indian Parliament attack in August 2003, along with his deputy commander. The BSF raided Baba's hideout in Srinagar, and he was killed in the ensuing gun battle along with his deputy chief.

However, with changing tactical and operational conditions, and expansion and modernisation of State police, the Government withdrew all 60 BSF battalions and redeployed them on the Indo-Pakistani border and Bangladesh–India border. These troops were then replaced by fresh troops from the CRPF that had undergone specialised training in counter-terrorism.

Some units of the BSF are also deployed in Central India to combat Naxal violence. Counter-Maoist operations are diversified. BSF is deployed in Kanker district of Chhattisgarh, where Naxal strength is comparatively thinner than that of other parts of Bastar region. At present total 15 battalions of BSF are stationed in different parts of Kanker district to combat the Naxal.

After recent civilian killings in Kashmir the Home Ministry re-inducted the BSF for counter-insurgency operations and law-and-order duties in valley. The BSF units will be deployed in sensitive areas which lie in various districts of the Kashmir valley. A significant contributor to BSF success in the Kashmir Valley is Commandant Jagmohan Singh Rawat SM, KC. He has played a crucial role in counter-insurgency operations.

After Pahalgam Attack in the Union Territory of Jammu & Kashmir in India the Indian Armed Forces launched military operation which is named as Operation Sindoor against the terrorism originating from Pakistan. BSF played a significant role in operation Sindoor by targeting terrorist launch pads in Pakistan. In Jammu Region BSF destroyed 118 Pakistan Rangers Border Outposts. Prime Minister of India Shri Narendra Modi widely acknowledged the role of BSF in Operation Sindoor and appreciated the valour of BSF soldiers.

== Organisation ==
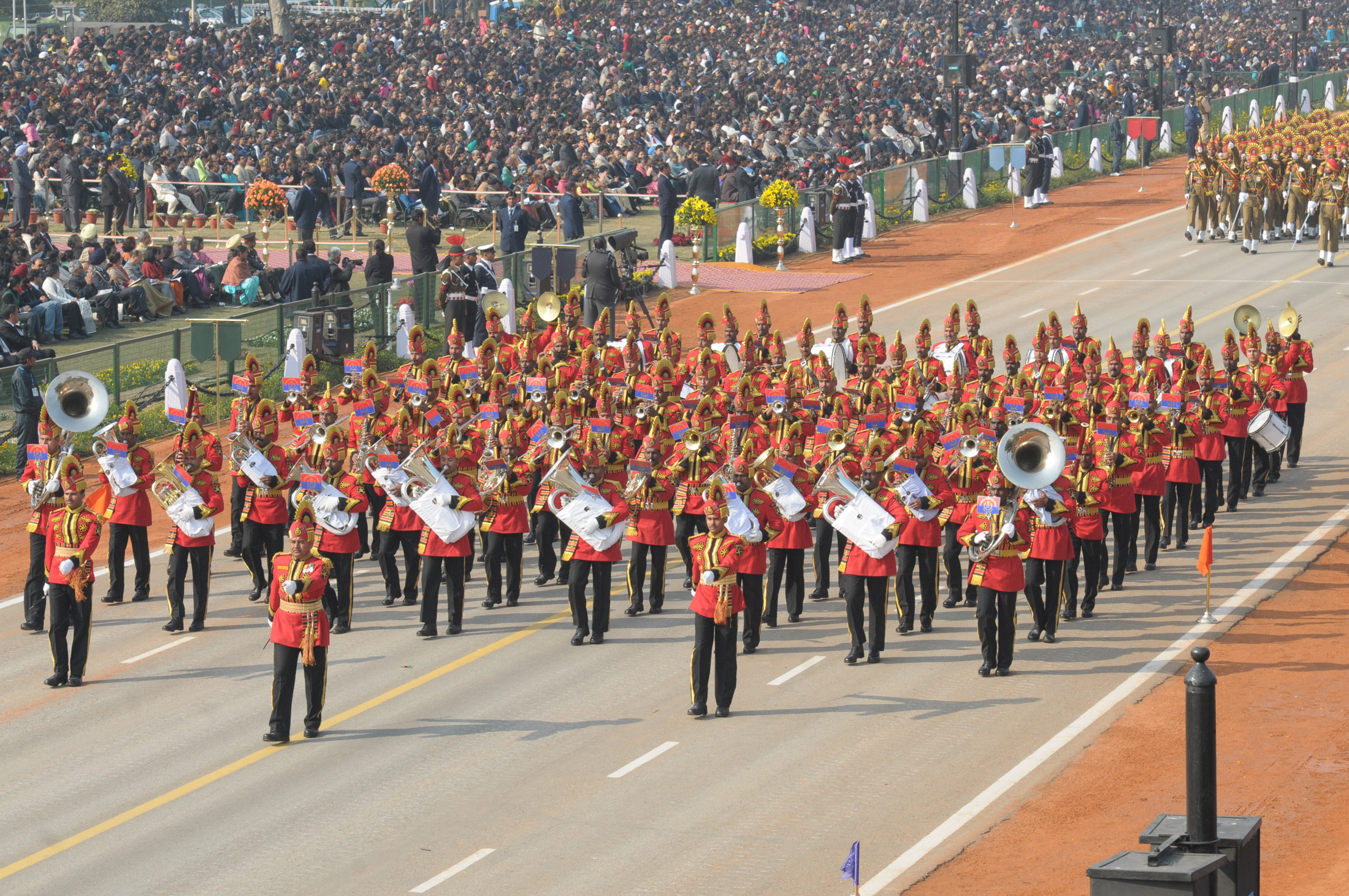
BSF band marching contingent during the 63rd Republic Day Parade.

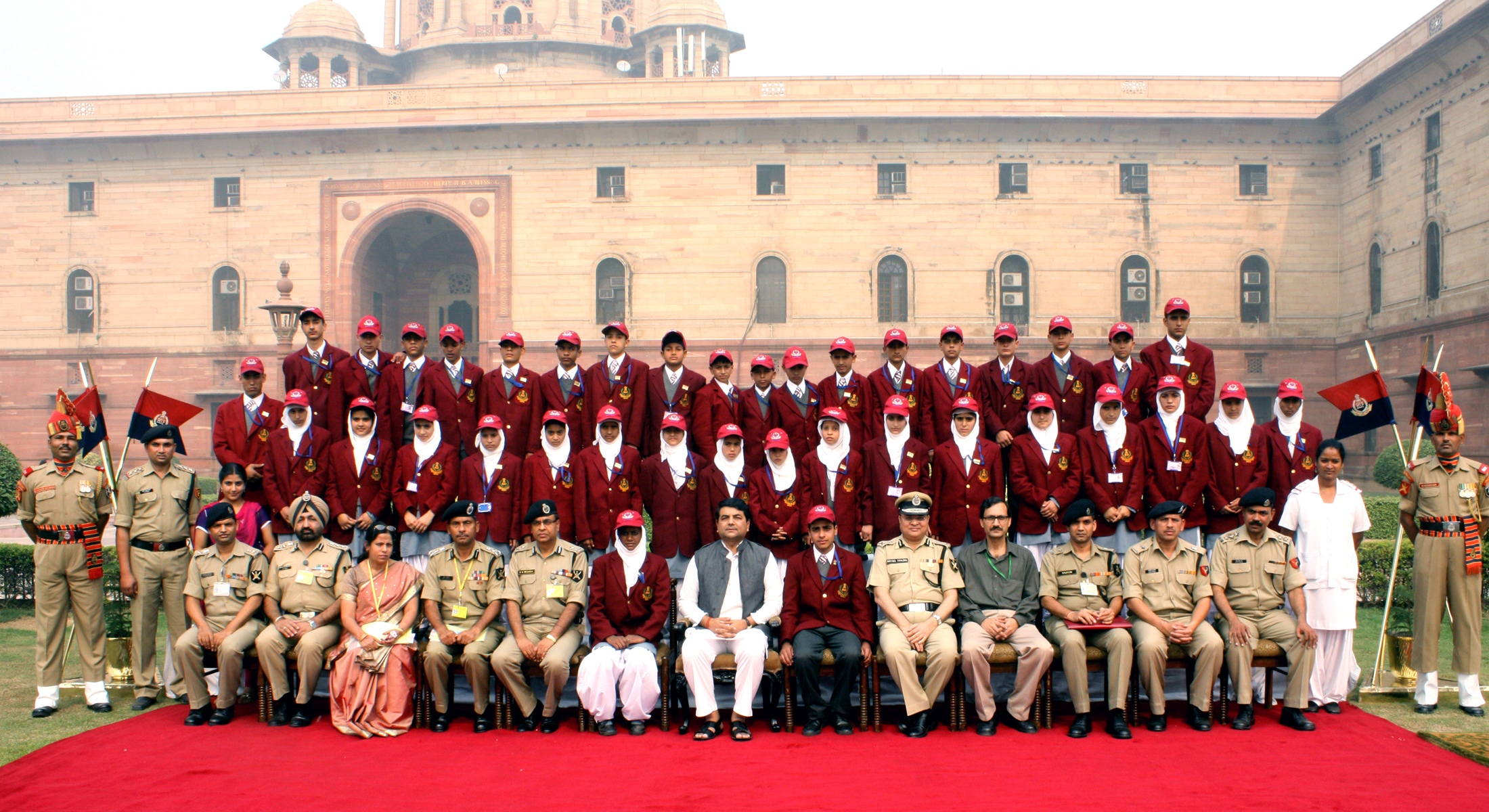
The Home Minister with children who are part of the Bharat Darshan Tour organized by the BSF in 2012.

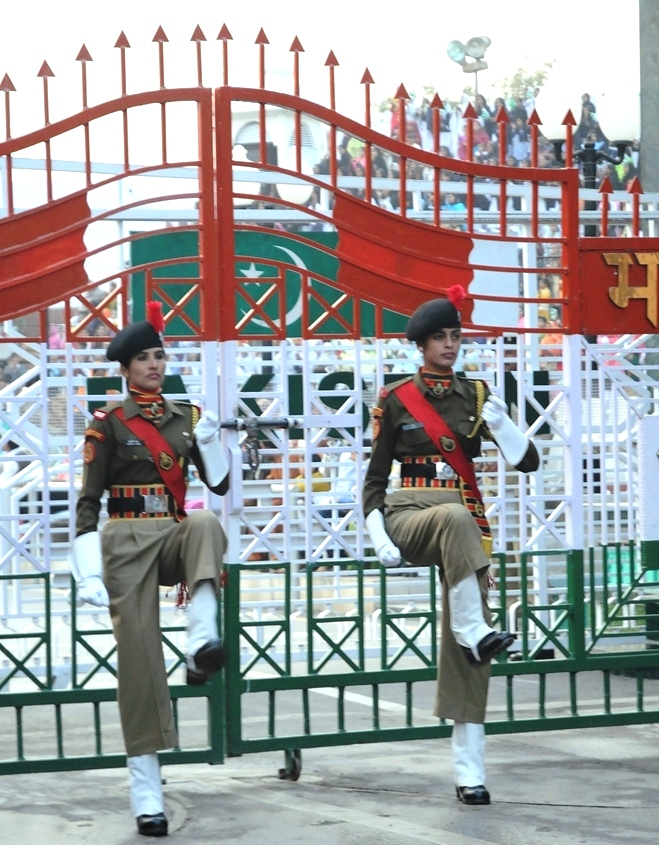
Women personnel of BSF taking part in the ceremonial retreat at the India-Pakistan border at Wagah, 2010.

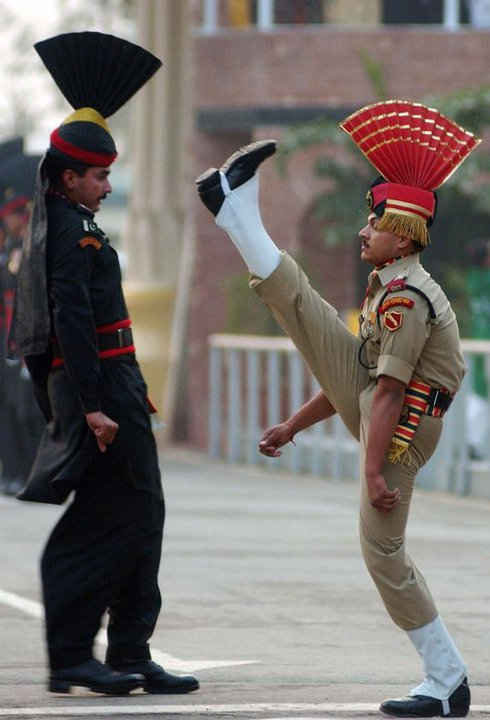
A BSF soldier performs at the Attari–Wagah border ceremony metres from a Pakistan Rangers soldier.

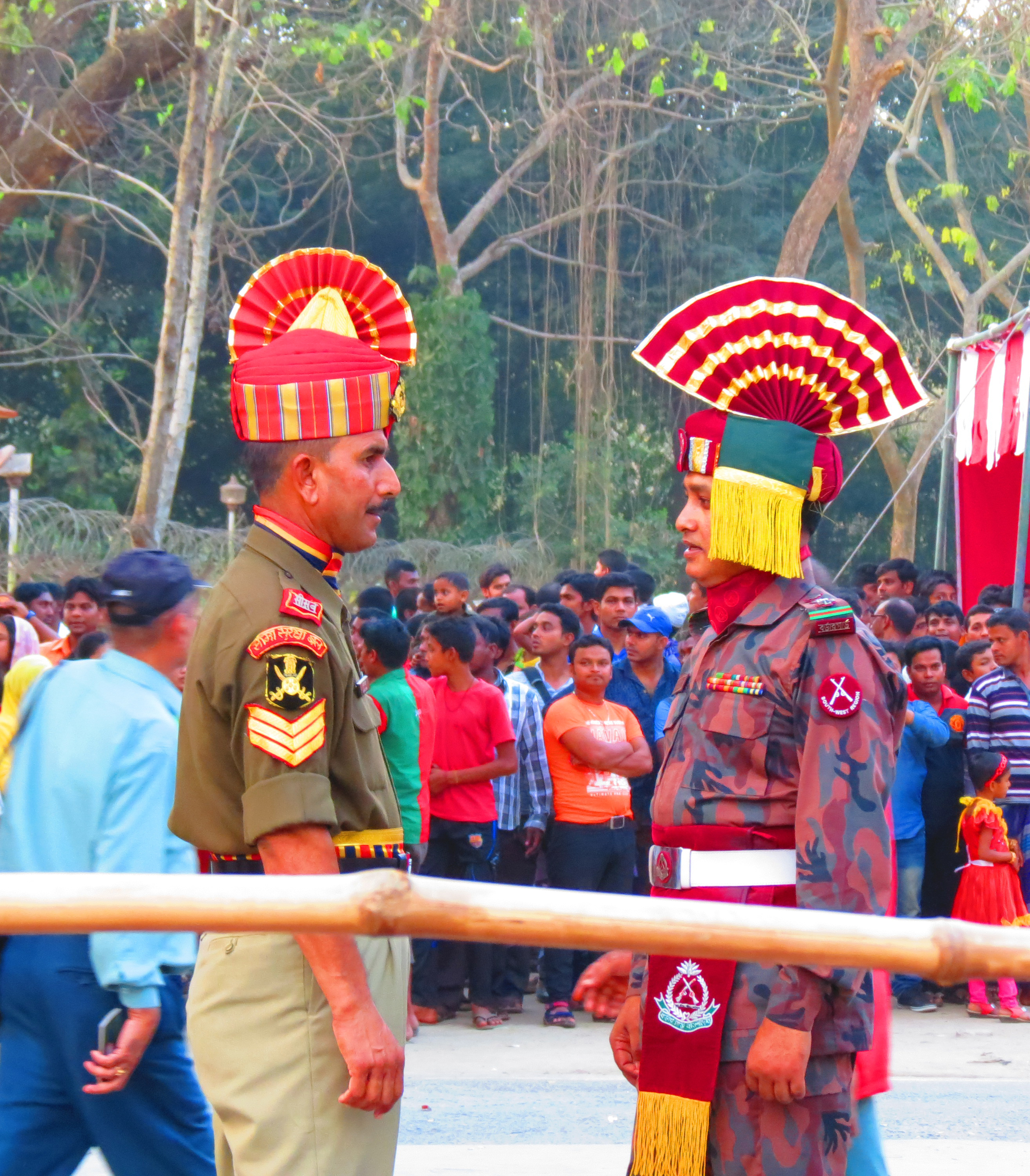
At the Petrapole-Benapole Border Ceremony, BSF and Border Guard Bangladesh personnel.

The Border Security Force has its headquarters in New Delhi and is known as Force Headquarters (FHQ) headed by a director general. Various directorates like Operations, Communications & IT, Training, Engineering, General, Law, Provisioning, Administration, Personnel, Armaments, Medical, Finance etc. function under the DG. Each directorate is headed by an IG. The Eastern Theatre is looked after by Spl. DG HQ (Eastern Command) at Kolkata and the Western Theatre is looked after by Spl DG HQ (Western Command) at Chandigarh. Field Formations in BSF are headed by an Inspector General (IG) and are known as Frontiers Headquarters (Ftr HQ). There is 13 such Frontier under which Sector Headquarters (SHQ) function headed by a Deputy Inspector General (DIG) each. Each SHQ has under its command, 4–5 infantry battalions, along with attachments of artillery, air and water wings. Presently 186 battalions are sanctioned to BSF. Five major training institutions and ten Subsidiary Training Centres (STCs) are imparting ab-initio as well as in-service training to its ranks and other CPOs/SPOs including IPS Probationers.

BSF is the only Central Armed Police Force to have its own Air Wing and artillery regiment, and besides ITBP to have a Water Wing. All these specialised wings support the General Duty Battalions in their operations. The Financial Adviser of the BSF has been an Indian Revenue Service officer of the rank of Joint Secretary and also has Dy Advisers from the Indian Audit and Accounts Service, Indian Civil Account Service and Indian Defence Account Service.

The BSF also has a national level school for the breeding and training of dogs. Dogs from other CPOs and State Police are sent to National Training Centre for Dogs (NTCD) to be trained in infantry patrol, detection of explosives, tracking and the like.

The BSF maintains a Tear Smoke Unit (TSU), which is unique in India. The TSU is responsible for producing tear gas munitions required for the Anti-Riot Forces. It also exports a substantial quantity to other countries.

Three battalions of the BSF, located at Kolkata, Guwahati, and Patna, are designated as the National Disaster Response Force (NDRF). Each battalion maintains 18 self-contained specialist search and rescue teams of 45 personnel each, including engineers, technicians, electricians, dog squads and medics and paramedics. The establishment of each battalion is 1,158 personnel. The NDRF is a multi-disciplinary, multi-skilled, high-tech force for all types of disasters and can deploy to disasters by air, sea, and land. These battalions are equipped and trained for all natural disasters including combating Chemical, Biological Radiological, and Nuclear (CBRN) disasters.

Since 2014, as a part of modernisation, BSF also started installing infra-red, thermal imagers, aerostats for aerial surveillance, ground sensors, radars, sonar systems to secure riverine borders, fibre-optic sensor and laser beam intrusion detection systems on specific sections of border with Pakistan and Bangladesh. These Hi-tech systems are installed in areas where barbed wire fencing could not be installed due to treacherous terrain or marshy riverine topography. The largest section of this system is located at Dhubri, Assam, where Brahmaputra river enters Bangladesh.

In May 2025, the BSF will adopt a digital camouflage pattern.

=== ORBAT ===
- Western Command, Chandigarh
  - Gujarat Frontier, Gandhinagar
    - Barmer Sector
    - Gandhinagar Sector
    - Bhuj Sector,
  - Rajasthan Frontier, Jodhpur
    - Jaisalmer (South)Sector
    - Jaisalmer (North) Sector
    - Bikaner Sector
    - Ganganagar Sector
  - Punjab Frontier, Jalandhar
    - Ferozepur Sector
    - Amritsar Sector
    - Gurdaspur Sector
  - Jammu Frontier, Jammu
    - Jammu Sector
    - Sunderbani Sector
    - Rajauri Sector
    - I/Nagar Sector
  - Kashmir Frontier, Humhama
    - Srinagar Sector
    - Baramulla Sector
    - Bandipore Sector
    - Kupwara Sector
- Eastern Command, Kolkata
  - South Bengal Frontier, Kolkata
  - North Bengal Frontier, Kadamtala
  - Meghalaya Frontier
    - SHQ Shillong (at Mawpat)
    - SHQ Tura
  - Tripura Frontier, Agartala
  - Mizoram & Cachar Frontier, Masimpur
    - Aizawl Sector
    - Cachar Sector
    - CI Ops Manipur
  - Assam Frontier, Guwahati
  - FTR HQ (Spl Ops), Odisha
- SHQ Koraput
- SHQ Malkanagiri

=== Special Detachments ===
==== Creek Crocodile ====
The Creek Crocodile is the specialised commando unit of BSF. Primary objective of this unit is to act as Quick reaction force and prevent smuggling and infiltration by unwanted elements. The unit is specifically deployed at Indus River Estuaries in Gujarat and Sir Creek. It was raised in 2009. The base of operations of this unit is located at Koteshwar outpost of BSF. They are equipped with All-Terrain Vehicles (ATV) and fast patrol boats.

==== Camel Contingent ====
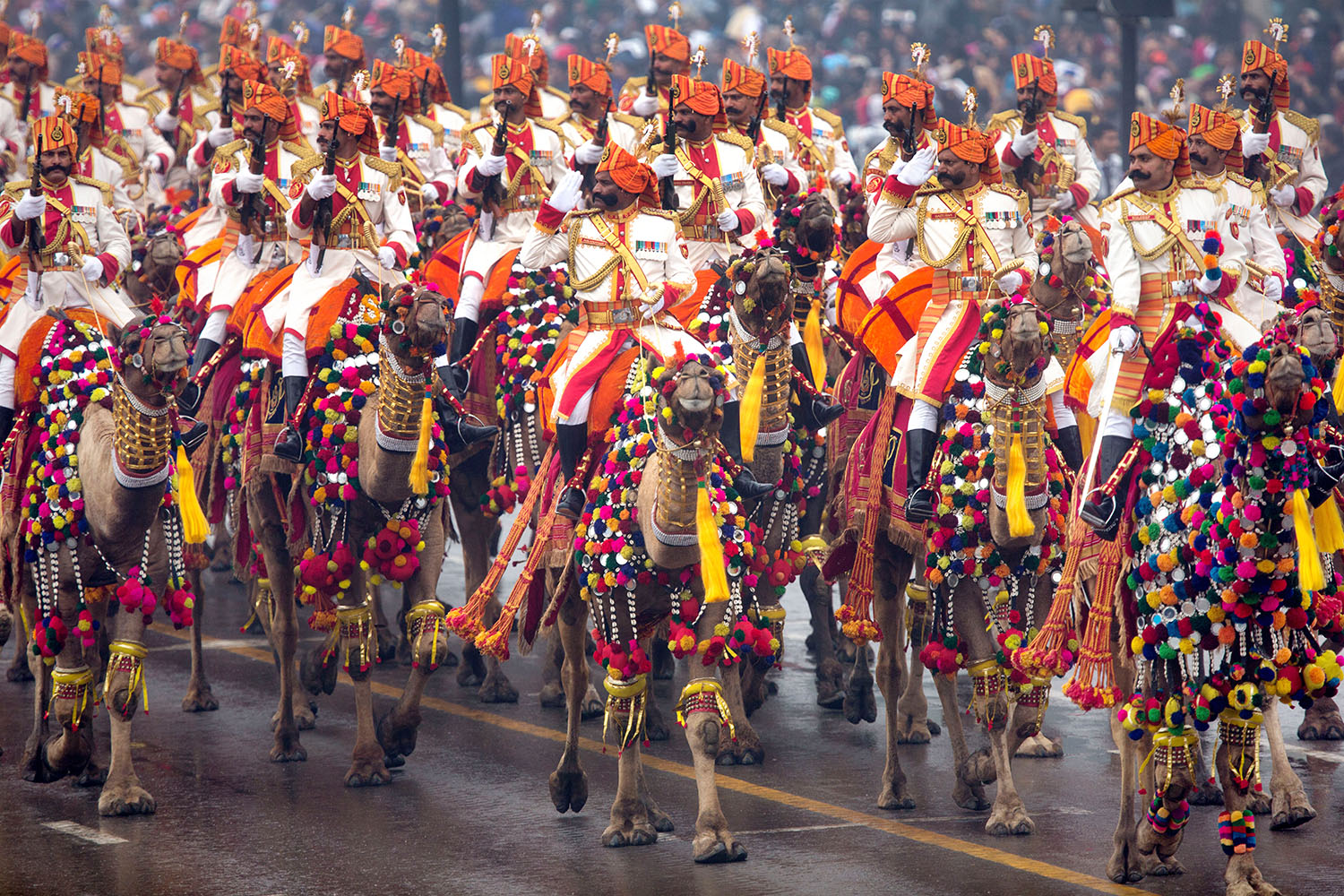
Camel contingent during a parade

BSF Camel Contingent is a specialised battalion-size Camelry Unit which has its roots in Bikaner Camel Corps. The primary purpose of this unit is to patrol the desert section of the border with Pakistan. This unit has a strength of 1,200 camels and 800 riders. Both camels as well as rientre located at BSF Frontier Headquarters in Jodhpur.

However, with force modernisation pacing up, BSF has equipped its formation across the western border with All-Terrain Vehicles and other specialised apparatus.

=== Training and doctrine ===
Following the success of Operation Sindoor, the Border Security Force (BSF) is raising its first dedicated drone squadron to enhance surveillance and strike capabilities along the India–Pakistan border. The unit will operate from select Border Outposts (BoPs) and be directed by a central control room at the BSF's Western Command in Chandigarh.

Equipped with reconnaissance, surveillance, and attack UAVs, the squadron is a direct response to the surge in cross-border drone threats witnessed during and after Operation Sindoor. In addition to procuring new drones, the BSF is hardening its border defences, upgrading bunker infrastructure, and coordinating with defence agencies to deploy counter-drone systems at vulnerable locations.

In August 2025, the BSF established the Drone Warfare School at its Academy campus in Gwalior, Madhya Pradesh. It is the first institution in India dedicated to drone warfare training. The school is organised into three wings— Flying and Piloting, Tactics and Research and Development.It conducts courses such as the six-week Drone Commando Course for junior personnel and the one-week Drone Warrior Course for officers.

== Rank structure ==
=== Officers ===
Rank group	General / flag officers			Senior officers			Junior officers
Border Security Force	Director-general - / Special director-general - / Additional director-general -
Border Security Force	Director-general - / Special director-general - / Additional director-general -	Inspector general -	Deputy inspector-general -	Commandant -	Second-in-command -	Deputy commandant -	Assistant commandant -
Police equivalent	Director General of Police / Director General (Level 16) / Additional; Director General	Inspector General (IG)	Deputy Inspector General (DIG)	Senior Superintendent (SSP)	Superintendent of Police (SP)	Additional Superintendent (Addl.SP)	Assistant/Deputy Superintendent of Police (ASP)
Army equivalent	Lieutenant general (Level 17) / Lieutenant general (Level 16) / Lieutenant general (Level 15)	Major general	Brigadier	Colonel	Lieutenant colonel	Major	Captain

=== Personnel Below Officer Rank ===
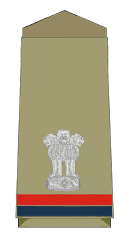
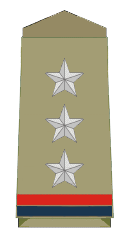
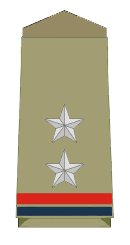
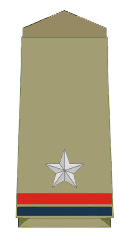
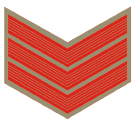
Rank group	Subordinate Officers (SO)				Non commissioned officers (NCO)	Enlisted
Border Security Force						No insignia
Border Security Force	Subedar major सूबेदार मेजर	Inspector निरीक्षक	Sub-inspector उप निरीक्षक	Assistant sub-inspector सहायक उप निरीक्षक	Head constable हवलदार	Constable कनिष्ठबल

== Equipment ==
All the equipment including the uniforms, weapons, ammunition, vehicles such as the bullet proof vehicles, troop carriers, logistics vehicles, mine protected vehicles are manufactured indigenously at the Indian Ordnance Factories under control of the Ordnance Factories Board. Drone and anti-drone equipment is an upcoming acquisition.

Name	Country of origin	Type
Pistol Auto 9 mm 1A	India	Semi-automatic pistol
Glock	Austria	Semi-automatic pistol
Beretta Mx4 Storm	Italy	Submachine gun
Heckler & Koch MP5	Germany	Submachine gun
AKM	Soviet Union	Assault rifle
INSAS	India	Assault rifle
IWI TAR-21	Israel	Assault rifle
INSAS LMG	India	Machine gun
FN MAG	Belgium	Machine gun
NSV	Soviet Union	Machine gun
Bren	India	Machine gun
vz.59	Czechoslovakia	Machine gun
Vidhwansak	India	Sniper rifle
Barrett M82	United States	Sniper rifle
Steyr SSG 69	Austria	Sniper rifle
FN FAL	Belgium	Sniper rifle
Carl Gustaf 8.4 cm recoilless rifle	Sweden	Rocket launcher
AGS-30	Russia	Rocket launcher
Milkor MGL	South Africa	Rocket launcher
ARDE Under Barrel Grenade Launcher	India	Rocket launcher

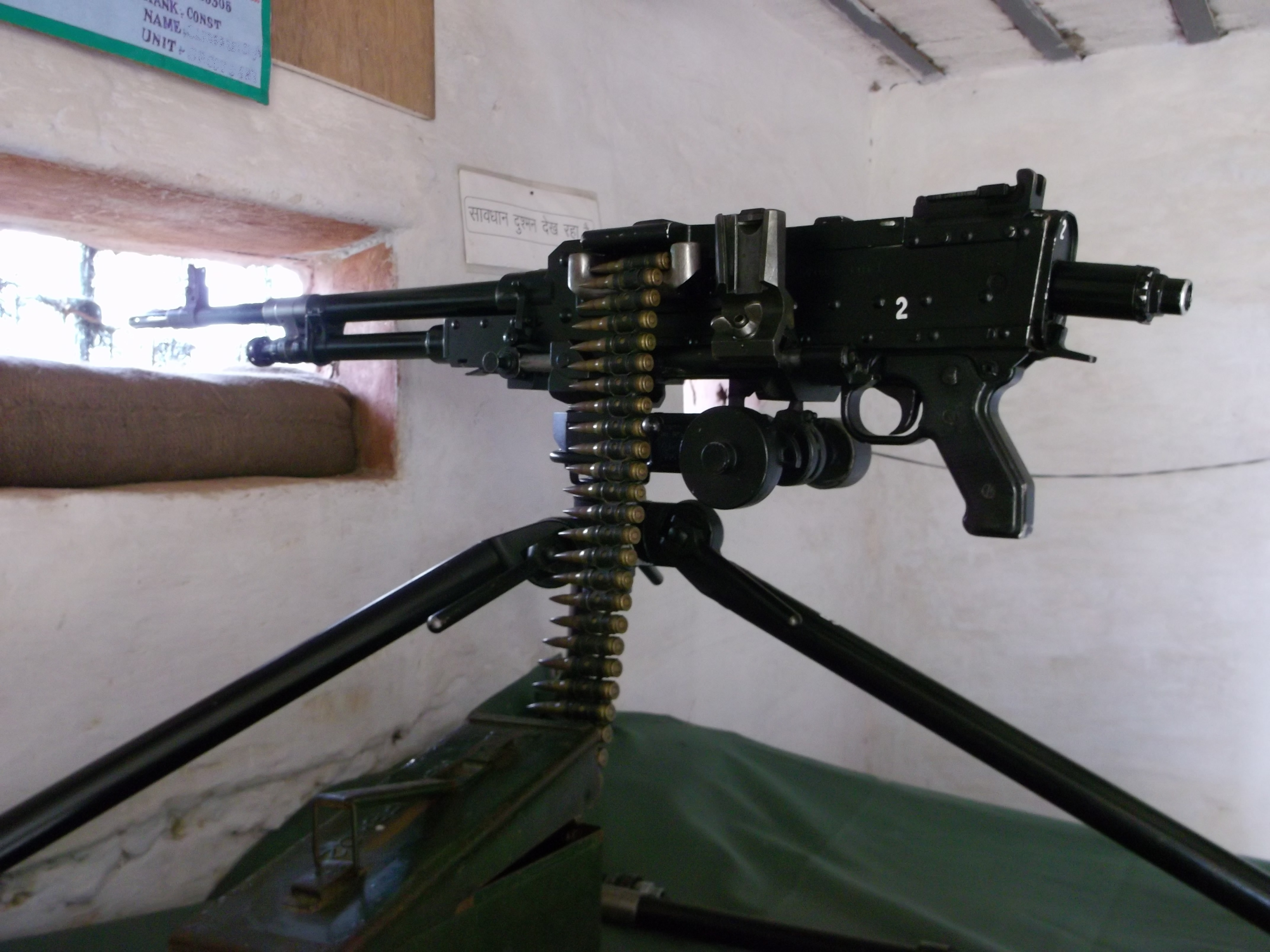
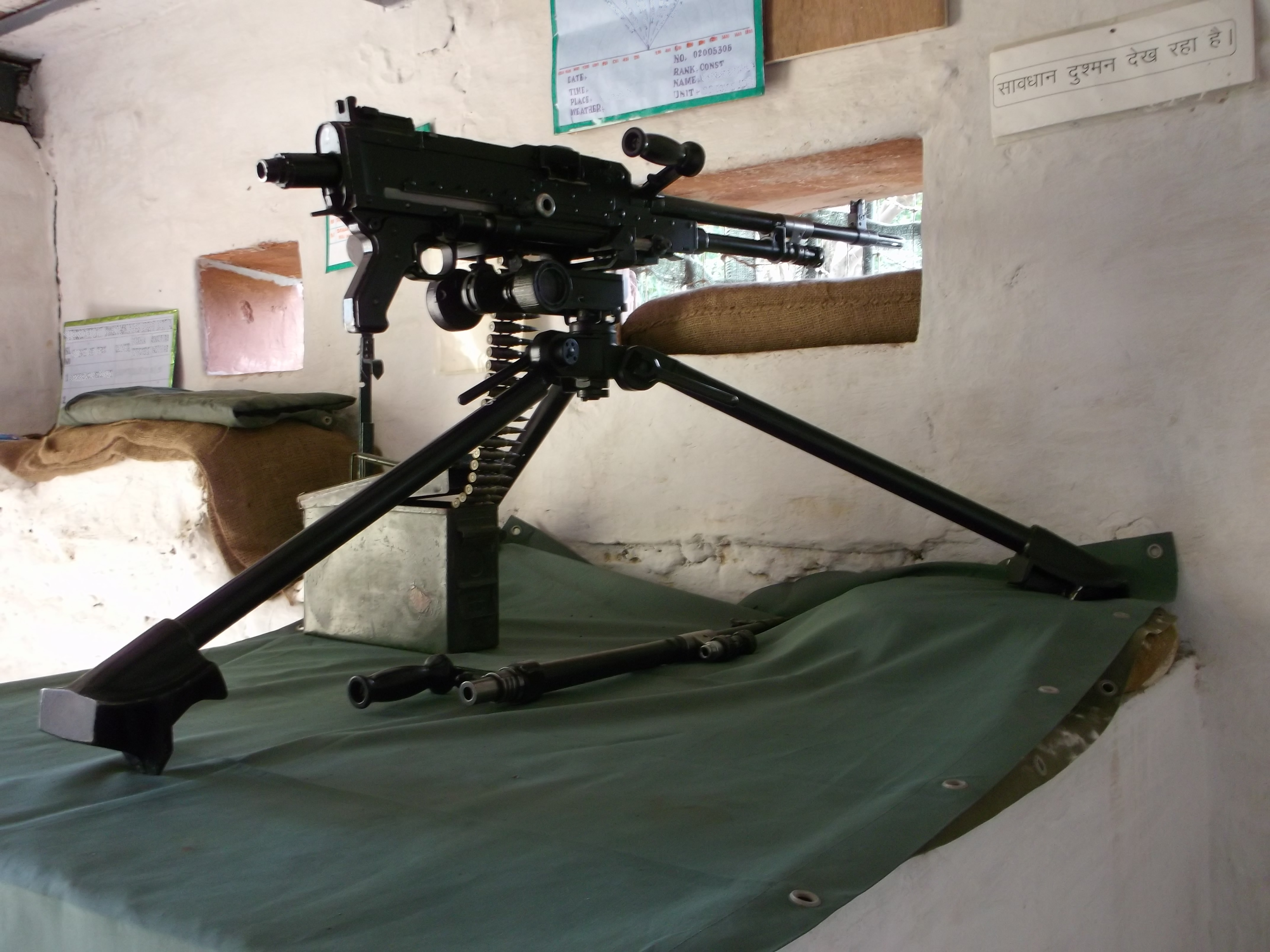
FN MAG medium machine gun

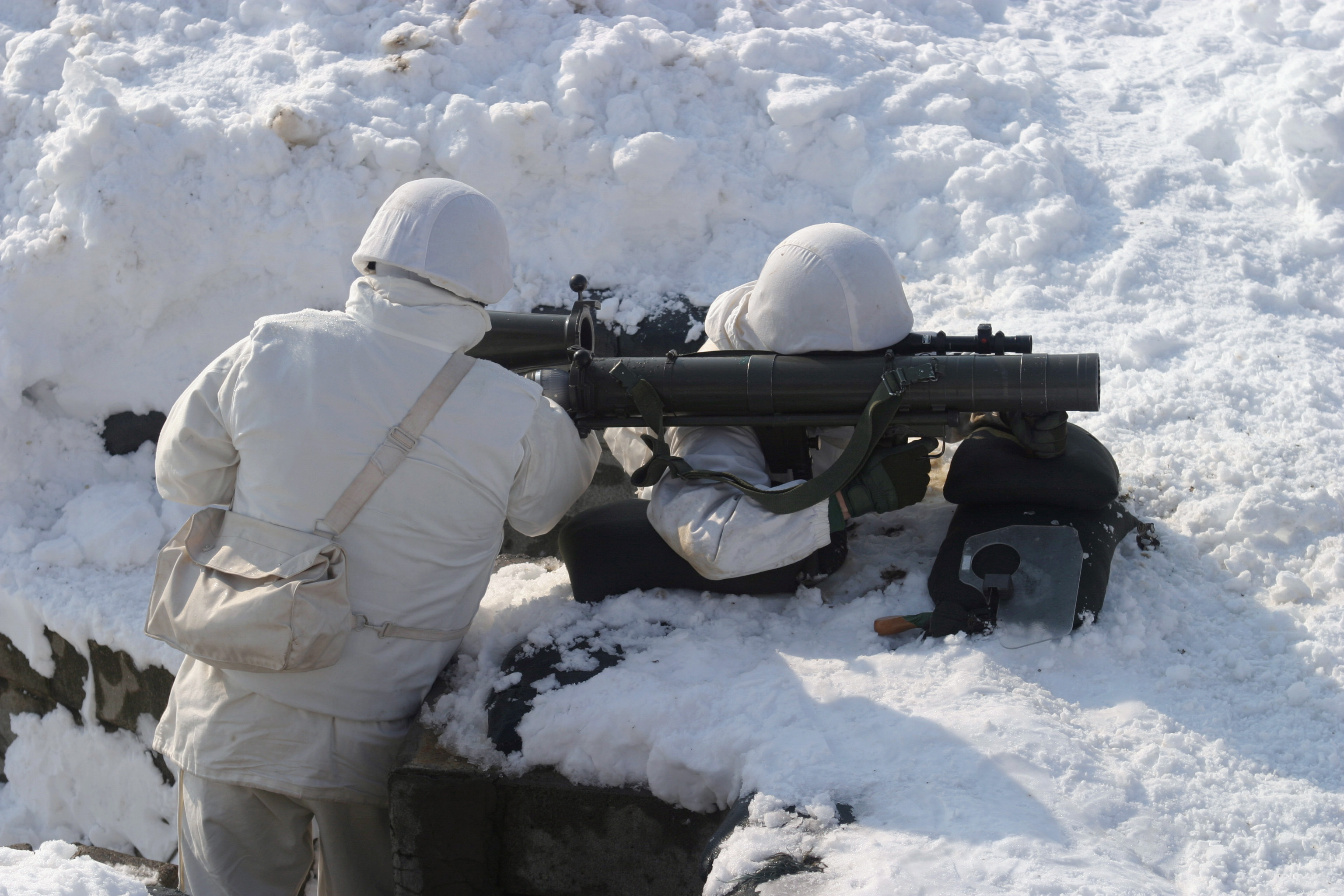
Carl Gustav recoilless rifle

- Carl Gustav 84 mm recoilless rifles

=== Artillery ===
- 51 mm Mortar
- 81 mm Mortar
- 120 mm Mortar
- Advance Air defence Avni Gun
- 105 mm Indian Field Gun

=== Armoured ===
- Mahindra Rakshak military light utility vehicle
- OFD Mine Protected Vehicle
- Tata 407 Armoured Variant
- Maruti Gypsy Armoured Variant
- Mahindra Bolero Armoured Variant
- Mahindra Bolero Neo Armoured Variant
- Armoured Agricultural Tractors

=== Aircraft ===
The aircraft fleet are distributed to different air wings at air bases of Air Force or Army Aviation Corps. This includes 1 Fixed Wing (HS748, ERJ135BJ) at Palam AFS and 5 Rotary Wings (Mi-17, Dhruv) at Agartala AFS, Mountain Shadow AFS, Raipur Airport, Ranchi Airport, and Srinagar AFS.

- Hawker Siddeley HS 748 - 01
- Embraer 135 BJ - 01
- Beechcraft Super King Air - 2
- Mi-17 V5 Helicopter - 08
- Mi-17 1V Helicopter - 06
- HAL Dhruv - 06
- HAL Cheetah - 01

=== MANPADS ===
- SA-16 Gimlet
- SA-7 Grail

=== Watercraft ===
- Floating Border Out-Post - 10
- See BSF (Water Wing)

== Criticism and controversy ==
=== Canadian controversy ===
In 2010, some Canadian visa officials rejected the immigration application of a retired BSF soldier Fateh Singh Pandher, terming BSF a "notoriously violent paramilitary unit engaged in systematic attacks on civilians and responsible for torturing suspected criminals." This accusation did not go down well with the Government of India. The Indian External Affairs Ministry was asked by the Home minister to take up the issue with Canada. The Home ministry of India, as well as the Indian public in general and several of India's political parties, expressed outrage at this attack and called Canada's actions discriminatory and spurious, and denounced their charges against the BSF as baseless and unproven. The Indian government threatened diplomatic retaliation unless Canada withdrew their allegations. The Canadian government did not respond immediately. It was speculated that diplomatic retaliation from India will consist of banning Canadians going to participate the War in Afghanistan if they are doing so through India. Public outrage in India prompted Canadian authorities to express "great respect for India's armed forces and related institutions." Subsequently, India's Ministry of External Affairs summoned Canadian High Commissioner Joseph Caron and demanded that "the blatant discrimination against Indian security agencies" cease. India's Minister of External Affairs, SM Krishna, condemned Canada's actions and has expressed pride in the accomplishments of the BSF.

Following complaints made by the Indian government and criticism of Canada's actions against India, the Harper government retracted their earlier accusations against BSF security officials. Canada's Minister of Citizenship and Immigration, Jason Kenney, termed as "unfortunate" the incidents involving use of "foul language by the Canadian High Commission in visa rejection letters to some individuals," Kenney said, "This language, or the inaccurate impression it has created, in no way reflects the policy or position of the Government of Canada."

=== Bangladesh border killings ===
According to the Bangladeshi government, 136 civilians were killed and a further 170 others suffered injuries in 2009. The Indian government has said that 67 were killed and 80 injured in 2009. The Bangladesh government and Bangladeshi organizations protested heavily against these alleged killings. Media reports claim that in August 2008, Indian BSF officials admitted that they killed 59 persons (34 Bangladeshis, 21 Indians, rest unidentified) who were trying to cross the border illegally during the prior six months. Indian media claimed that, in 2001, Bangladesh Rifles ambushed and killed 16 BSF soldiers while they were chasing some Bangladeshi smugglers back into the Bangladesh. Bangladesh side says the reason was illegal occupation of Padua and Baraibari village since 1971. This lead them to disputes and then to border clash, where more than 400 BSF, army and also few black cat's soldiers died. Since then, the BSF has been compelled to act tough against Bangladeshi illegals. There was perceived retaliation by the BSF but was averted after Home Ministers of both countries had talks on the issue.

In July 2009 Channel 4 News reported that apparently "hundreds" of Bangladeshis and Indians are indiscriminately killed by the BSF along the Indo-Bangladeshi Barrier. The BSF claims that the barrier's main purpose is to check illegal immigration to India, and prevent cross-border terrorism from Islamists.

Bangladeshi media accused the BSF of abducting 5 Bangladeshi children, aged between 8 and 15, from the Haripur Upazila in Thakurgaon District of Bangladesh, in 2010. The children were setting fishing nets near the border.

In 2010, Human Rights Watch (HRW) issued an 81-page report which alleged "over 900 of abuses by the BSF" in the first decade of the 21st century. The report was compiled from interviews with victims of BSF shootings, witnesses and members of the BSF and its Bangladeshi counterpart. According to HRW, while most of them were killed when they crossed into Indian territory for indulging in cattle raiding or other smuggling activities.

In February 2012, the BSF website was hacked by Bangladeshi hackers in retaliation. The hackers later shared the news in the internet and also in the other social sites where they claimed to have defaced the sites asking the BSF to stop killing Bangladeshis at border. The site became normal sometime on 15 February 2012.

=== Martyr Status ===
Over the past 20 years, i.e. from 2010, the Border Security Force (BSF) has experienced significant casualties in the line of duty, primarily due to cross-border firing incidents along the Line of Control (LoC). For instance, in 2018, the BSF reported 11 personnel killed in such incidents, marking the highest casualty figure for the border force in a year in the last eight years.

Additionally, between January 2015 and September 2016, a total of 774 BSF personnel died, with 25 deaths attributed to battle casualties. The remaining fatalities were due to various causes, including diseases, especially from mental illness.

Despite their service akin to the Indian Armed Forces, the Government of India does not officially recognize BSF and paramilitary personnel as martyrs, a stance that has been a subject of ongoing debate and concern within the force and among the public.

== Challenges ==
=== Working conditions ===
Working conditions of the BSF have been questioned. "Zero Error Syndrome" adds stress. A home ministry standing committee report on the "Working Conditions in Border Guarding Forces" was published in December 2018, it was chaired by P. Chidambaram.

=== Health ===
Health of employees remains a challenge, and given the numbers of the force, more employees, as compared to operational deaths, die of diseases, illness; and mental health issues have also been raised and addressed by the force.

== In Media ==
- BSF has appeared in National Geographic channel's documentary BSF : The First Line of Defence.
- Many Indian Cinematic movies have also showcased the role of BSF and these are Ground Zero, Border, Refugee, Tango Charlie, Wagah, Natwar Lal, Mission Kashmir and Article 370 etc.
- In November 1999 a serial was telecasted by the name of Samarpan on DD Metro based on BSF soldiers role in Kashmir Insurgency.
- The documentary 'Living with Border Security Force' by Amit Goswamy talks about the human-wildlife interactions at the India-Pakistan border in Rajasthan.

== See also ==
- Assam Rifles
- Border Security Force (Water Wing)
- Central Industrial Security Force
- Central Reserve Police Force
- Indo-Tibetan Border Police
- Sashastra Seema Bal
- Border Security Force Sporting Club
