= Border Security Force (Water Wing) =

Special units of Border Security Force of India

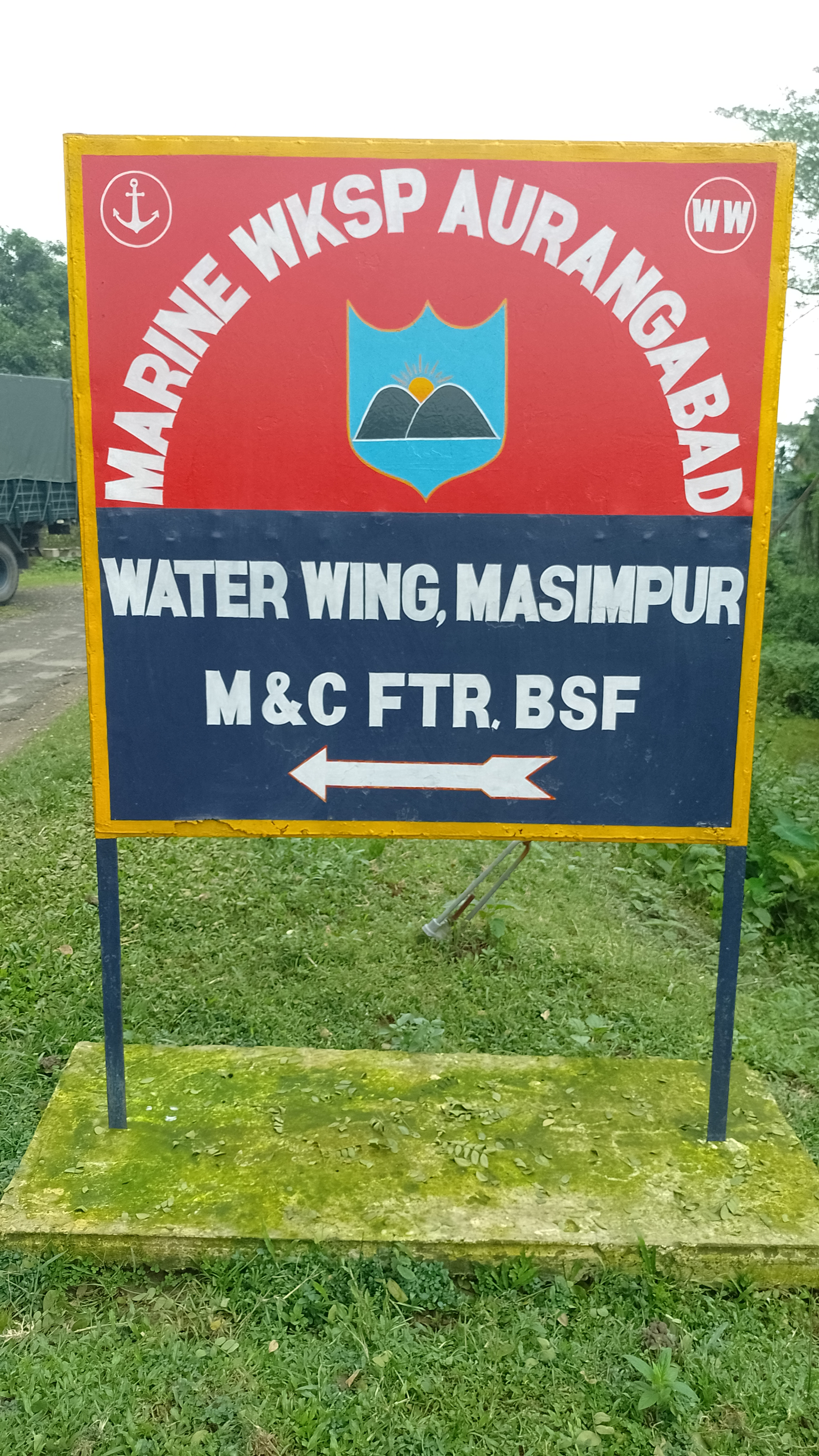
Signboard showing Border out-post of BSF water wing

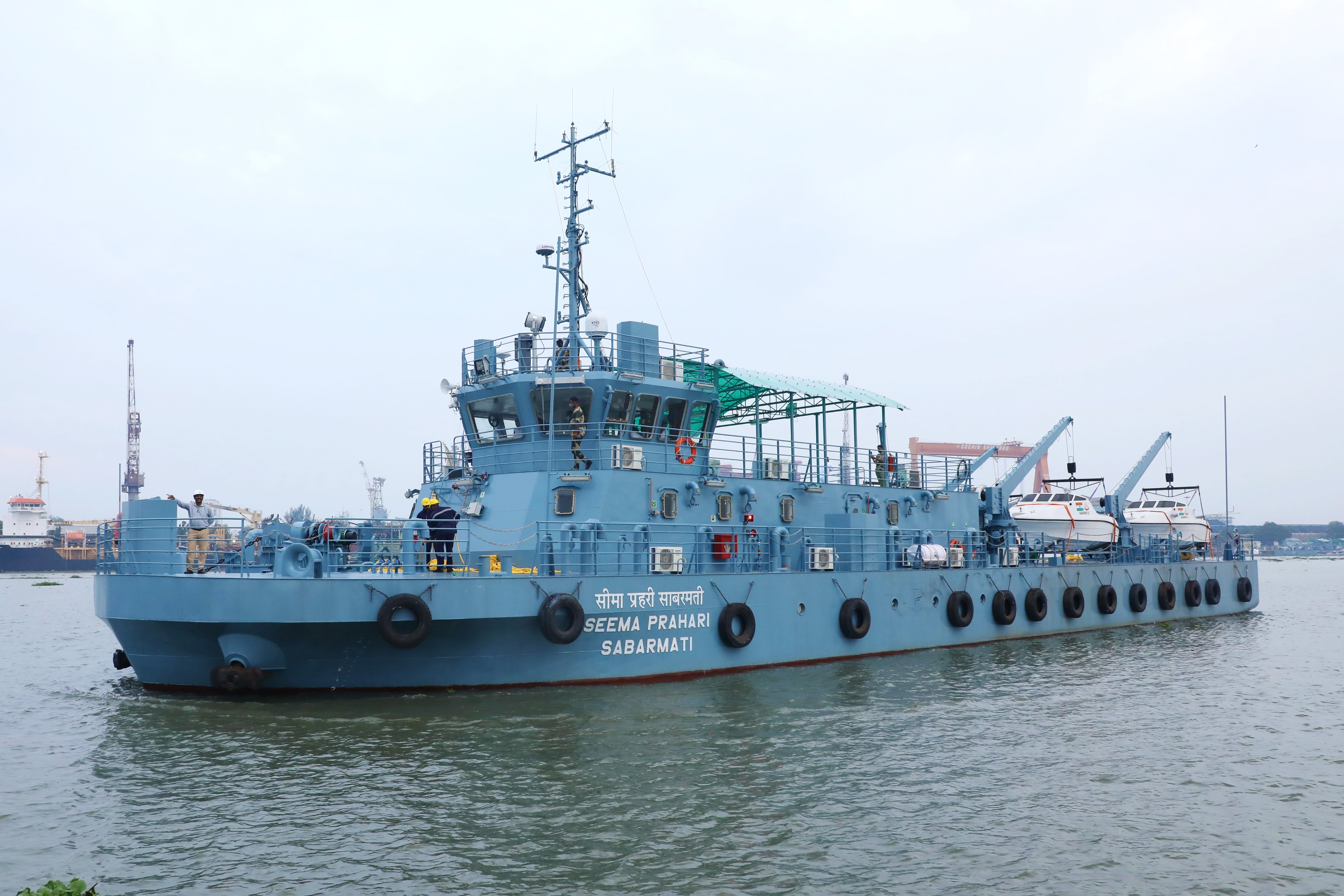
Floating Border Out-Post vessels (FBOP) Sabarmarti

Border Security Force (Water/Marine Wing) is one of the special units of Border Security Force of India. It is responsible for patrolling riverine borders in North Bengal frontier, South Bengal frontier, Andaman Nicobar frontier, Tripura - Mizoram & Cachar (TMC) Frontier, Jammu frontier, Punjab frontier and Gujarat frontier of the BSF. The Water Wing guards around 1400 km of a riverine boundary of India. its members are filled either by deputation basis or from special batches of BSF personal trained from National Inland Navigating Institute, Patna.

== List of watercraft in Border Security Force (Water Wing) ==
Type of crafts	Numbers
Floating Border Out Posts (FBOPs)	10
Medium Crafts	12
Mechanised Boats	25
Speed Boats	131
Rigid Inflatable Boats	43
Naka Boats	120
Country Boats	92
Fast Patrol Boats	22
Swamp Boats	1
Total	455

== See also ==
- Indo-Tibetan Border Police (Water Wing)
