= Khusro Faramurz Rustamji =

Indian police officer

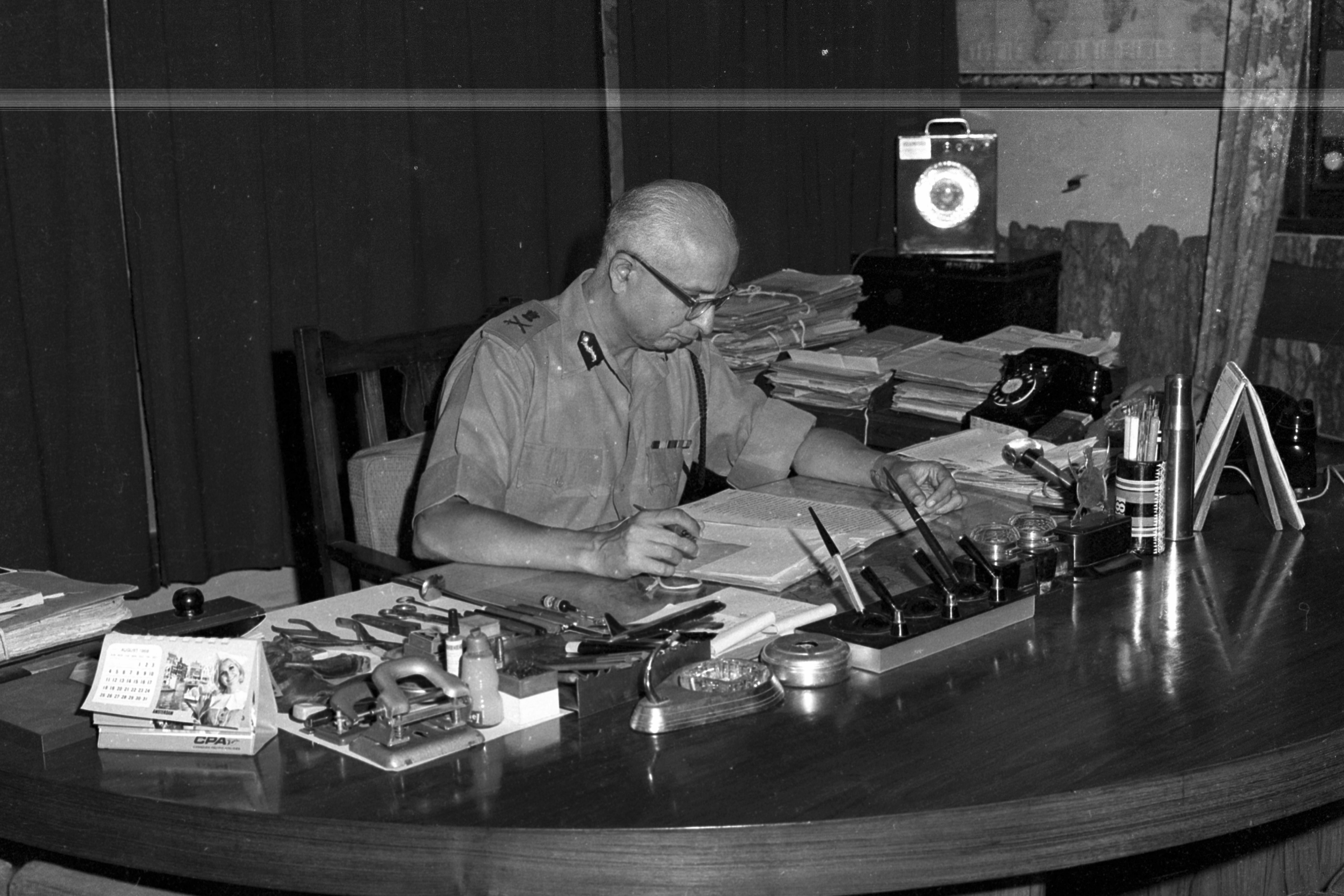
Sri K. F. Rustamji, Director General BSF in office.

Khusro Faramurz Rustamji, better known as K. F. Rustamji, (1916 - 2003) was the only police officer in India thus far to have been awarded the Padma Vibhushan, India's second highest civilian award. This award has been in recognition of his multifarious achievements, including the Public Interest Litigation (PIL).

== Early life ==
Rustamji was born in Kamptee, near Nagpur (India) on 22 May 1916. His parents were both Parsis from Bombay (now Mumbai). His entire school and college education was in Nagpur. He studied in St Francis de Sales School and had his college education in Science College. He passed his M.Sc (Zoology) in 1936 securing the first position in the Nagpur University. He worked as a Demonstrator (Assistant Professor) in the same college from 1936 to 1938.

Rustamji qualified the competitive Civil Service examination and was selected for the prestigious service the Indian Police (also sometimes referred to as the Imperial Police) in 1938 from the erstwhile State of Central Provinces and Berar, later known as Madhya Pradesh (MP).

== Career ==
When he had put in four years service and was still an Assistant Superintendent of Police, he was put on duty in Nagpur to quell the riots that took place during the course of the disturbances due to the Quit India Movement in August 1942. He was up against a life-threatening situation and dealt with it courageously. He was awarded the Indian Police Medal for his exemplary handling of the situation.

Soon after the independence of India, he was posted in December 1947 as Superintendent of Police to Raigarh district in the eastern part of the State of MP. He had to oversee the integration of the princely States of Raigarh, Sakti, Sarangarh, Jashpur and Udaipur, consequent on the Government of India's decision to integrate the princely States into the Indian Union.

In May 1948, he was posted to Akola, a district bordering the erstwhile princely State of Hyderabad. He took part in the Hyderabad Police Action, which was ordered by the Government of India as the Nizam of Hyderabad was unwilling to integrate the State with the Indian Union.

In 1949, Rustamji was promoted as Deputy Inspector General of Police to Aurangabad (the then State of Hyderabad). He had to deal with the first Communist insurgency movement.

In August 1952, Rustamji was selected to be the Chief Security Officer to India'a first Prime Minister Jawaharlal Nehru. He remained in that post for six years until June 1958, when he was appointed as the Chief of the Madhya Pradesh Police.

As Inspector General of Police of Madhya Pradesh, Rustamji dealt successfully with the problem created by the armed dacoits of the Chambal region. The formidable gangs of Amritlal, Rupa, Lakhan Singh and nose-chopping dacoit Gabbar Singh (who became a household name after the film Sholay) and many others were eliminated.

In 1965, Rustamji was selected to raise the Border Security Force (BSF). By the time he retired the BSF had a strength of 60,000 men. The BSF played a significant part in the Indo-Pak War of 1971 and in the Liberation of Bangladesh.

After retirement from the BSF, he was made Special Secretary in the Ministry of Home Affairs and while in that position, he headed a committee which submitted the report for the formation of the Indian Coast Guard, an organization to patrol the maritime border.

He was responsible for the setting up of the National Police Commission and later became its member from 1978 to 1983.

In 1978 he visited the jails in Bihar and wrote about the conditions of the undertrial prisoners languishing in the jails for long periods without a trial. His two articles in the national daily, The Indian Express formed the basis for the first Public Interest Litigation (Hussainara Khatoon vs State of Bihar). As a consequence of the judgement in this case, 40,000 undertrial prisoners were released from jails all over India.

In his retired life he spent his time writing articles on subjects of topical interest, many of which were published in the newspapers and magazines. His exposés were highly appreciated and they were recognised with the award of the Padma Vibhushan in 1991.

== Death ==
Rustamji died in March 2003.

== Legacy ==
Rustamji Institute of Technology, the first engineering college in India established by a paramilitary force, is named after him.

== Bibliography ==
Books on/by Rustamji

His diaries and writings were edited to bring out two books which were in the nature of an autobiography.

- I Was Nehru’s Shadow
- The British, the Bandits and the Bordermen (New Delhi: Wisdom Tree, 2009)
- Encyclopedia of Indian Police

== Awards ==
- Indian Police Medal in 1942
- Police Medal for Distinguished Services in 1958
- Padma Bhushan in 1972
- Padma Vibhushan in 1991
