= Brigitte Kornetzky =

German filmmaker

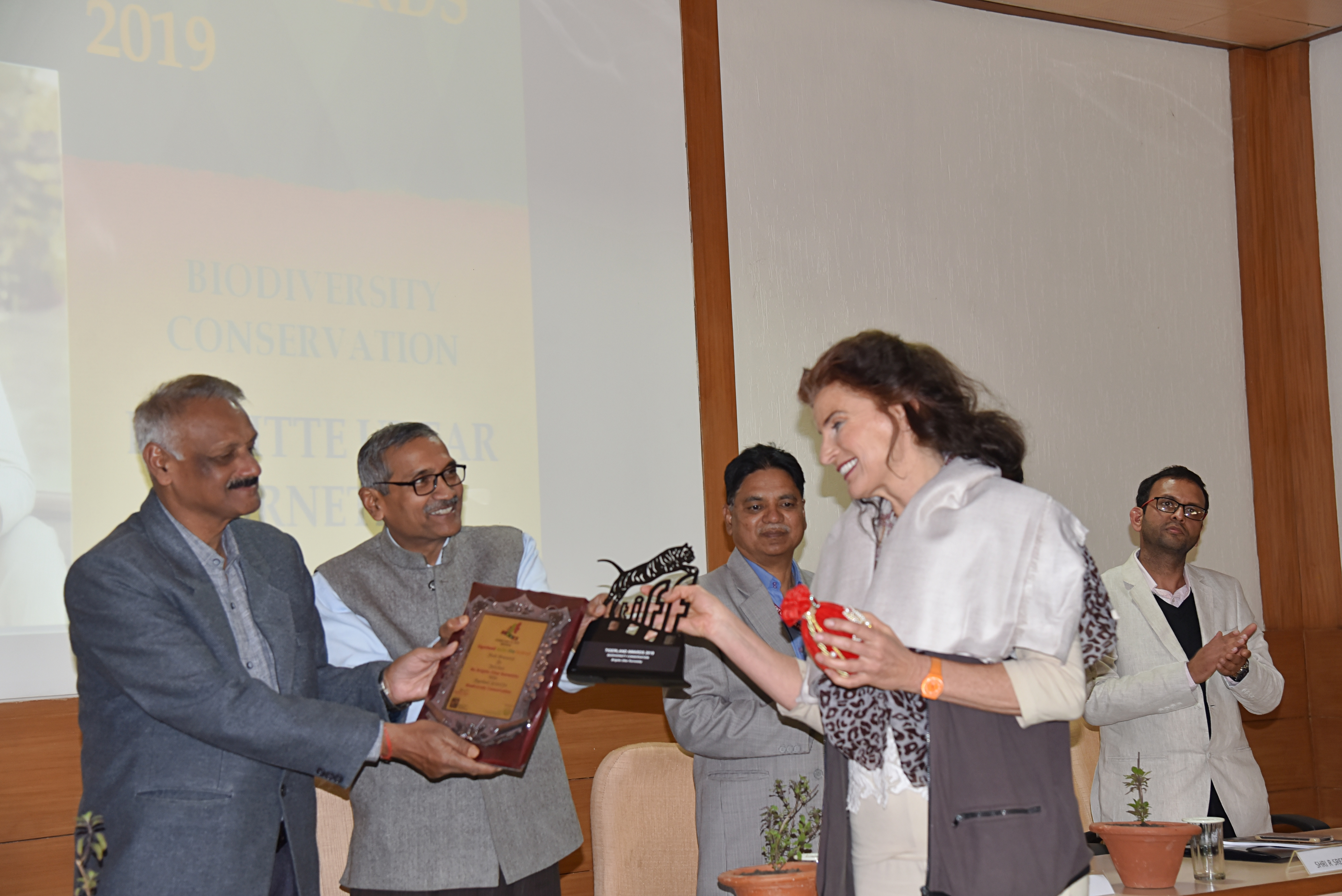
- Brigitte Uttar Kornetzky receives TIBCA 2017 from PCCF Madhya Pradesh and others
- Born: Brigitte Uttar Kornetzky; 1959 (age 66–67); Germany
- Occupations: Director, producer, editor, cinematographer
- Years active: 2009–present
- Website: www.kornetzky.ch

Brigitte Uttar Kornetzky (born 1959), is a German–Swiss Indie filmmaker. She directed multiple award winning feature documentaries like God No Say So, Imagine, the Sky.,Where the Elephants Sleeps, Elephants From Zero to Hero (2023) and The Fall and Rise of Elephants`Paradise, as well as numerous short films like Cheetal Walk, Sugarcane Village, Elephant Kitchen and Behind Bars.

Apart from being an independent filmmaker, Kornetzky is also an artist, singer, journalist and writer.

Kornetzky is the Founder and President of "Elefanten in not" a Swiss charity as well as the Swiss Ambassador for Captive Elephants at the Federation of Indian Animal Protection Organisation (FIAPO), and Program Manager of the Europe-India Chamber of Commerce & Industry (EUICCI)

Kornetzky has dedicated her life to protect elephants in both, captivity and the wild. She has been conducting master classes in environmental film making in leading science film festivals like The International Science Film Festival Kolkata, India, and is known as an inspirational speaker on elephants, wildlife and nature protection to many universities and colleges in India. Her documentaries have been screened on leading world film festivals and have been broadcast on tv internationally. Through her organization ELEFANTEN IN NOT, she conducts elephant awareness programs with her films like Foot Treatment For Elephants mahout training programs and support for several Indian organisations and individuals.

== Personal life ==
She was born in 1959 in Germany. She has degree in art, music, philosophy and law. She currently lives and works in Switzerland, India and South Africa.

== Career ==
When Kornetzky visited India, she observed several captive elephants that were injured due to torture. With the information gathered during The Visit, she later made the documentary Where The Elephant Sleeps.

In 2010, she made the indie documentary film God No Say So. After the success of that film, she made the documentary Imagine, the Sky. The latter deals with the life of pupils at the Milton Margai School for the Blind in Freetown, Sierra Leone, West Africa. In the film, she took part in seven different roles other than director: producer, editor, writer, cinematographer, sound editor, art director and composer. During the making of the documentary, she helped the people in Sierra Leone through her co-founded organization: 'A Grain of Change'. The film received critical acclaim and screened at several film festivals.

== Filmography ==
Year	Film	Role	Genre	Ref.
2010	God No Say So	Director, producer, editor, writer, cinematographer	Documentary	
2011	Imagine, the Sky	Director, producer, editor, writer, cinematographer, sound editor, art director, composer	Documentary	
2016	Where The Elephants Sleep	Director, producer, editor, writer, cinematographer	Documentary	
