= Central Information Commission =

Statutory body in India

- (केंद्रीय सूचना आयोग)
- The official logo of Central Information Commission

Commission overview
- Formed: 12 October 2005; 20 years ago
- Headquarters: CIC Bhawan, Baba Gang Nath Marg, Staff Quarters, Old JNU Campus, Munirka, South Delhi, Delhi - 110067
- Annual budget: ₹25.1935 crore (US$2.6 million) (2015–16)
- Commission executive: Raj Kumar Goyal
- Key document: RTI Act, 2005 (Act no. 22 of 2005)
- Website: www.cic.gov.in

The Central Information Commission is a statutory body, set up under the Right to Information Act in 2005 under the Government of India to act upon complaints from those individuals who have not been able to submit information requests to a Central Public Information Officer or State Public Information Officer due to either the officer not have been appointed, or because the respective Central Assistant Public Information Officer or State Assistant Public Information Officer refused to receive the application for information under the Right to Information Act.

The commission includes one chief information commissioner and not more than ten information commissioners who are appointed by the President of India on the recommendation of a committee consisting of the Prime Minister as chairperson, the Leader of Opposition in the Lok Sabha and a Union Cabinet Minister to be nominated by the Prime Minister. Two women have been chief information commissioners: Deepak Sandhu (fourth chief information commissioner overall) and Sushma Singh (fifth overall). The oath to CIC is administered by President of India.

== Chief Information Commissioners ==
The following have held the post of the chief Information Commissioners.

List of Central information Commissioners
No.	Name	Took office	Left office
1	Wajahat Habibullah	26 October 2005	19 September 2010
2	A. N. Tiwari	30 September 2010	18 December 2010
3	Satyananda Mishra	19 December 2010	4 September 2013
4	Deepak Sandhu	5 September 2013	18 December 2013
5	Sushma Singh	19 December 2013	21 May 2014
6	Rajiv Mathur	22 May 2014	22 August 2014
7	Vijai Sharma	10 June 2015	1 December 2015
8	Radha Krishna Mathur	4 January 2016	24 November 2018
9	Sudhir Bhargava	1 January 2019	11 January 2020
10	Bimal Julka	6 March 2020	26 August 2020
11	Yashvardhan Kumar Sinha	7 November 2020	3 October 2023
12	Heeralal Samariya	6 November 2023	13 September 2025
13	Raj Kumar Goyal	15 December 2025	Incumbent

== Current Information Commissioners ==
#	Name	Designation	From	To
1	Raj Kumar Goyal, IAS	Chief Information Commissioner		
2	Anandi Ramalingam, IFoS	Informationa Commissioner		
3	Vinod Kumar Tiwari,	Informationa Commissioner		
4	Surendra Singh Meena	Informationa Commissioner		
5	Ashutosh Chaturvedi	Informationa Commissioner		
6	Swagat Das, IPS	Informationa Commissioner		
7	Sudha Rani Relangi	Informationa Commissioner		
8	P. R. Ramesh	Informationa Commissioner		
9	Khushwant Singh Sethi	Informationa Commissioner		
10	Jaya Varma Sinha, IRTS	Informationa Commissioner		
11	Sanjeev Kumar Jindal	Informationa Commissioner		

== State Information Commission ==
Following is the list of State Information Commissions.

Rank	State	States Information commission
1	Andhra Pradesh	Andhra Pradesh Information Commission
2	Arunachal Pradesh	Arunachal Pradesh Information Commission
3	Assam	Assam Information Commission
4	Bihar	Bihar Information Commission
5	Chhattisgarh	Chhattisgarh State Information Commission
6	Goa	Goa State Information Commission
7	Gujarat	Gujarat State Information Commission
8	Haryana	Haryana State Information Commission
9	Karnataka	Karnataka State Information Commission
10	Jammu & Kashmir	Jammu & Kashmir State Information Commission
11	Kerala	Kerala State Information Commission
12	Madhya Pradesh	Madhya Pradesh State Information Commission
13	Maharashtra	Maharashtra State Information Commission
14	Meghalaya	Meghalaya State Information Commission
15	Mizoram	Mizoram Information Commission
16	Nagaland	Nagaland Information Commission
17	Orissa	Odisha State Information Commission
18	Punjab	Punjab State Information Commission
19	Rajasthan	Rajasthan Information Commission
20	Sikkim	Sikkim State Information Commission
21	Tamil Nadu	Tamil Nadu Information Commission
22	Tripura	Tripura State Information Commission
22	Uttarakhand	Uttarakhand Information Commission
22	Uttar Pradesh	Uttar Information Commission
22	Telangana	Telangana Information Commission
23	Himachal Pradesh	Himachal Pradesh Information Commission
24	Manipur	Manipur Information Commission
25	West Bengal	West Bengal Information Commission
25	Jharkhand	Jharkhand State Information Commission
