= Power Sportz =

Indian live sports news digital channel

- Country: India
- Broadcast area: Global
- Network: Digital

Programming
- Language(s): Hindi, English
- Picture format: HD

History
- Launched: 19 May 2018

Power Sportz is India's first live sports news and journalism channel on a digital platform and it is based in Gurugram, India. Kanthi D Suresh is the founder and chief editor of the channel. The platform was launched in May 2018 at the Vigyan Bhawan, New Delhi. The channel is available on Amazon Fire TV.

== History ==
In July 2018, Power Sportz launched its flagship show, Talking Turkey with Kanthi, which discusses issues existing in the Indian sports ecosystem such as the misconduct and fiefdom existing in the National Sports Federation of India, the resistance of BCCI to come under the purview of the RTI Act despite recommendations by the Lodha Committee and directive issued by the Central Information Commission (CIC) to ensure compliance, and the attempt of International Association of Athletics Federations's (IAAF) to regulate testosterone level in women athletes. The show criticized IAAF and supported the UN Council's backlash on IAAF.

Statistics and surveys by Power Sportz channel resulted in Shooting being declared the Best Sports of 2018 in India.

In June 2019, Power Sportz won a legal case against Star Sports for interfering with the digital live streaming rights of Power Sportz for the 2019 ICC Cricket World Cup.

In June 2020, during the Black Lives Matter movement, it raised the issue of racism prevalent within the Indian national cricket team when West Indies cricketer Daren Sammy revealed that he was inundated with racial slurs during the Indian Premier League matches held in Hyderabad.

In September 2021, Power Sportz expanded to middle-eastern countries.

In 2022, Power Sportz organized a T20 Cricket tournament GPCL T20- Global Power Cricket League which was held in India.

== Awards ==
In September 2019, Power Sportz won the India International Excellence Award in the field of sports journalism.
