= Narayan Bareth =

Indian political journalist (1957–2026)

Narayan Barhath

State Information Commissioner of Rajasthan
- In office December 2020 – October 2022

Personal details
- Born: 1 October 1957 Rajasthan, India
- Died: 6 March 2026 (aged 68) Jaipur, Rajasthan, India
- Occupation: Journalist; political analyst; professor
- Website: Narayan Bareth on X

Narayan Barhath (1 October 1957 – 6 March 2026) was an Indian journalist and political analyst who served as the State Information Commissioner of Rajasthan. As a journalist, he associated with various news groups including BBC, The Asian Age, and The Pioneer. He served as Professor of Journalism at both the University of Rajasthan's Centre for Mass Communication and Haridev Joshi University of Journalism and Mass Communication.

== Early life ==
Bareth was born in Rajasthan, India on 1 October 1957.

== Career ==
=== Journalism ===
Bareth worked in the field of journalism for around three decades. He began his career at Navbharat Times in Kota in 1986 and went on to work with various news groups, including The Asian Age, BBC, Dainik Bhaskar, Deccan Chronicle, and The Pioneer. He is credited with laying the foundations for BBC in Rajasthan, working as BBC Rajasthan correspondent for over a decade. As an esteemed journalist in Rajasthan, he extensively covered the desert region's droughts and reported on issues such as the Indo-Pak border, migration, and the influx of refugees from Pakistan. He also wrote numerous articles on social discrimination, women's empowerment, and development stories from marginalized communities such as Muslims and Dalits in the state. He was associated with the campaign for the establishment of the RTI Act. In 2005, Prof. Bareth retraced Gandhi's famous Dandi March from Sabarmati to Dandi and documented his journey. Along with attending several orientation programs, he delivered speeches on media and journalism and participated in workshops in various locations. His research interests included radio journalism.

According to Bareth, caste-issues play minimal role in state elections in Rajasthan which alternates between Congress and BJP every five years. However, it is still an issue today where having a name associated with lower castes sets them apart. He highlighted the name change notices in newspapers, revealing the widespread impact on countless names, not just in Rajasthan.

Speaking on recent trends, Bareth stated that India has much to preserve in every field, but the market is now dominating everything. According to him, India's culture, spirituality, yoga, clothing, food are its soft power, but the country is losing sight of its identity. He expressed concern about the media's growing focus on advertising over the public interest, and believed that questioning is crucial to the understanding of society, which should not be suppressed.

=== State Information Commissioner ===
Narayan Bareth was appointed State Information Commissioner in December 2020.

During his 21-month tenure, Bareth resolved more than 7,000 cases, including 389 complaints. In some cases, officers were also directed to update their service records. During his tenure, Bareth fined over 200 rural development and Panchayati Raj officials, plus 35 urban development and local body officials who had failed to provide required information with regards to RTIs filed. Bareth stated that he had only 17 months of actual work due to the COVID-19 lockdowns, and treated all work with priority, including low-influence applications like pension cases and document requests.

Narayan Bareth acknowledged the importance of using the Right to Information (RTI) Act for good governance. According to him, only 3.5% of the population in Rajasthan is currently using the RTI. Bareth cited Sweden as an example of a country where the RTI has been implemented for nearly 250 years, resulting in faster work pace and almost non-existent corruption. He also stated that the Information Commission is working on increasing awareness about the RTI and that the biggest challenge for the commission is the backlog of nearly 18,000 pending cases in Rajasthan, with only 5,000 cases resolved so far. Despite the lack of resources, efforts were being made to work on people's appeals.

As the Information Commissioner, Bareth's last working day saw the resolution of 10 cases. In 21 months, he took no leave and resolved an average of 396 cases per month, which was a record. Bareth instructed Panchayati Raj and local bodies not only to provide information to applicants but also to disseminate and publish that information on their websites.

== Illness and death ==
Bareth was hospitalised for several days due to pneumonia in March 2026. On 6 March, he suffered a cardiac arrest, and later died at the age of 68. His funeral was held in Jaipur, the capital of Rajasthan.

== Positions held ==
| Position | Organization | Term |
|---|---|---|
| Commissioner | State Information Commission of Rajasthan | December 2020 – October 2022 |
| Minister | Journalists Association of Rajasthan | |
| Professor | Haridev Joshi University of Journalism and Mass Communication | 2013—2016 |
| Professor | Media Studies, University of Rajasthan | 2016—2017 |
