= Parinam =

Parinam (lit. 'result') may refer to:

- Parinam (1961 film), a 1961 Indian film
- Parinam (2005 film), a 2005 Indian Bengali-language film

== See also ==
- Parinamam, a 2003 Indian film by P. Venu
- Pariṇāmavāda, transformation theory in Indian philosophy
- Parinamana, transfer or merit or good deeds to others in Buddhism
- Parinamika, an Indian NGO
