= Arunachal Pradesh Information Commission =

Statutory body in Arunachal Pradesh, India

Arunachal Pradesh State Information Commission
- Established: 2 March 2006
- Jurisdiction: Arunachal Pradesh
- Location: ESS Sector, Old Planning Building, Opposite Arunachal Pradesh Legislative Assembly, P.O: Itanagar, Dist: Papum Pare, Arunachal Pradesh, PIN- 791111.
- Motto: Sanskrit: सूचना जनाधिकार:॥ (Soochna Janadhikaraha) transl. Information is the right of the people.
- Authorised by: Right to Information Act, 2005
- Judge term length: 3 years from the date of entering office or up to 65 years of age (whichever is earlier)
- Website: http://www.arnsic.nic.in/

State Chief Information Commissioner
- Currently: Sri Rinchen Dorjee

Arunachal Pradesh Information Commission is an autonomous and statutory body constituted as per The Right to Information Act, 2005 by the state government of Arunachal Pradesh through a notification in official Gazette. The commission will have one State Chief Information Commissioner (CIC) and not more than 10 State Information Commissioners (IC) to be appointed by the Governor on the recommendation of the committee consisting of the Chief Minister as chairperson, the Leader of the Opposition in the Legislative Assembly and a state Cabinet Minister nominated by the Chief Minister.

== History and Objective ==
Arunachal Pradesh State Information Commission has to be constituted as per The Right to Information Act, 2005 by the State Governments in India through a notification in official Gazette.

Arunachal Pradesh State Information Commission is formed to take up the following:

- Appeals on the information shared by various government entities under the Right to Information Act.
- Complaints on refusal to give information or in relation to inability to file Right to Information Act.
- Commission should get annual report from various departments working in the state about complaints received under Right to Information Act, 2005 and their responses on the same.

Arunachal Pradesh Information Commission occasionally conducts awareness programmes on implementation of the Right to Information (RTI) Act, 2005 effectively by general public.

== Composition ==
Arunachal Pradesh State Information Commission members should consist of a:

1. State Chief Information commissioner and

2. Not more than ten State Information Commissioners.

The Chief and other members of State Information Commission are appointed by the Governor on the recommendation of the committee consisting of the Chief Minister as chairperson, the Leader of the Opposition in the Legislative Assembly and a state Cabinet Minister.

The members of State Information Commission should be of eminence in public life and are not permitted to hold any other office of profit or any position which is connected with any political party and are also barred from carrying on any business or continuing any profession in any field.

Rinchen Dorjee is the current Chief Information commissioner of Arunachal Pradesh Information Commission.

== Tenure and Service ==
The tenure of the Arunachal Pradesh State Chief Information Commissioner and a State Information Commissioner for holding office will be a term of 3 years or until they attain the age of 65 years, whichever is earlier and will not be eligible for reappointment on completion of tenure. Any vacancy in the State Information Commission has to be filled within six months from the date of vacancy.

Arunachal Pradesh Chief Information Commissioner (CIC), Information Commissioner (IC) and State Information Commissioner's salaries, allowances and other service terms and conditions are equivalent to a Judge of the Supreme Court.

== Powers and Functions ==
Arunachal Pradesh State Information Commission prepares report on the implementation of the provisions of State Information Commission act and submits an annual report to the state government which is placed by the later before the state legislature.

The commission on reasonable grounds can order inquiry into any matter related to the Act.

The commission under powers granted to it can secure from the public authorities compliance of any of its decisions.

Commission is duty bound to receive and conduct enquiry into any complaint received from any person. The commission can call for and examine any record which it considers necessary and is under the possession of the public authority and any such record should not be withheld from it on any grounds during the inquiry of a complaint.

The commission has the power of the civil court during the course of enquiry and in respect of the following matters:

Any complaint which requires the discovery and inspection of documents relating to it.

Powers exercised for issuing summons requiring examination of any witnesses or related documents or any other prescribed matters relating to complaint.

Any provision under which summons were issued and as per which attendance is required of persons and requires them to give written or oral evidence under an oath and producing documents or other details relevant to it.

Provision requiring evidence on stamped affidavit.

Powers relating to request from any court or office of any public record.

Commission under the powers can recommend steps which can be taken for confirming to the provisions of the act if any public authority fails to do so.

== Challenges ==
Arunachal Pradesh State Information Commission are overburdened with backlog cases, similar to Central Vigilance Commission. Due to shortage of available staff and vacancies not being filled, there is backlog of cases filed. The maximum number of appeals and complaints pending as per October 2014 records were in state of Uttar Pradesh. However, some states like Mizoram, Sikkim and Tripura didn't have pending complaints. State Information Commission as per the provision has limited to provide information and cannot take any action.

In spite of above limitation, Arunachal Pradesh State Information Commissions plays a crucial role in ensuring transparency in public life and supports in greater way in checking corruption, combating oppression, preventing nepotism and misuse of the public authority.

A survey conducted by Commonwealth Human Rights Initiative, showed that most State Information Commission in India were inactive during Covid pandemic.

== See also ==
- Central Information Commission
