= Enaith Habibullah =

Indian military personnel

- Born: 2 April 1910; Lucknow, India
- Died: 15 July 1990 (aged 80)
- Spouse: Hamida Habibullah
- Military career
- Allegiance: British India; India
- Branch: British Indian Army; Indian Army
- Rank: Major general
- Unit: 16th Light Cavalry
- Commands: National Defence Academy

Enaith Habibullah (2 April 1910 – 15 July 1990) was an Indian Army General and the first Commandant of the National Defence Academy.

== Background and family ==
Enaith Habibullah was born in Lucknow, India, into the Muslim feudal aristocracy of Oudh. They were the Taluqdars of Saidanpur estate in Barabanki district, which they had received for services rendered to the Nawab of Awadh, and which they continued to enjoy under the British Raj. Enaith's father, Sheikh Mohammad Habibullah, himself taluqdar of Saidanpur, also served for many years as regent or governor of the (much larger) estate of Mahmudabad. Enaith's mother was Inam Habibullah, she came from an educated and affluent Muslim family belonging to Kakori near Lucknow.

Enaith was one of four children both to Sheikh Mohammad Habibullah and Begum Inam Habibullah. He had two brothers, Isha'at and Ali Bahadur, and a sister, Tazeen.

- Isha'at settled in Karachi and took up a corporate career there. In 1942, he had become the husband of Jehanara (or Jahan Ara) of Najibabad. Jehanara was a sister of Rafa'at-uz-zamani Begum, wife of Mohammad Raza Ali Khan, last ruling Nawab of Rampur. Isha'at and Jehanara had two daughters, Muneeza and Naushaba. Muneeza is married to Saleem Shamsie and is the mother of two daughters, Saman Shamsie (an educationist) and Kamila Shamsie (a writer). Naushaba lives with her two children, son Sa'ad and daughter Samirah, in Montreal, Canada.
- Ali Bahadur Habibullah entered the colonial government service and happened to be posted in London when the partition of India happened. He chose India over Pakistan but remained posted in London for several years. When he was transferred eventually to India, his wife and children did not move with him, but remained in the UK. Much before partition, he had married Attia Hosain, his first cousin (his mother's sister's daughter). Attia is recognized as a gifted and empathetic writer, both of whose books deal with change being visited upon the settled and genteel land-owning families of Awadh. Her semi-autobiographical Sunlight on a broken column is prescribed reading, as a textbook, for degree courses in several universities in India and abroad. Her other work is a collection of short stories. Ali Bahadur and Attia grew estranged after the former moved to India and the latter, finding it impossible to let go of her memories and associations, chose to divide her time between India and England. They had two children, a son, Waris Habibullah, and a daughter, the scriptwriter Shama Habibullah.
- Tazeen Faridi was Enaith's only sister. Her daughter, Shahla, is married to Enaith's only son, Wajahat Habibullah.

== Education and career ==
Enaith was educated at Clifton College, Bristol and the Royal Military College, Sandhurst. He was commissioned a Second Lieutenant for the Indian Army on 28 August 1930. He spent a year attached to the 1st battalion East Yorkshire Regiment stationed in India before being posted to the 16th Light Cavalry on 5 January 1932. He saw action in Africa and fought against General Rommel in the battle of El Alamein World War II, later he was posted in Burma with the 16th Light Cavalry.

In 1947, upon partition he opted for the Indian Army.

He served as Commandant, National Defence Academy from 1953 to 1958. Promoted Major-General 28 August 1955. Served as Deputy G.O.C. Malayan Federal Army from April to October 1959, when he was recalled to India. Retired Major-General in 1965.

== Personal life ==
His son Wajahat Habibullah is a distinguished bureaucrat and his grandsons Amar Habibullah and Saif Habibullah are prominent businessmen. He is also survived by his eldest daughter, Dr. Nazli Siddiqui, who now lives in Canada.

The Habibullah Hall at the National Defence Academy is named in his memory.

== See also ==
- Hyderabadi Muslims
- Golkonda
- Hyderabad State
- India
- Muslim culture of Hyderabad
- History of Hyderabad for a history of the city of Hyderabad.
- Hyderabad (India) for the city.

== Sources ==
- National Defence Academy – Habibullah Hall Web Page
