= Nagaland Information Commission =

Statutory body in Nagaland, India

Nagaland State Information Commission
- Established: 2 March 2006
- Location: Kohima, Nagaland
- Motto: सूचना जनाधिकार:॥ (Soochna Janadhikaraha) Information is the right of the people. (Sanskrit)
- Authorised by: Right to Information Act, 2005
- Website: https://nlsic.nagaland.gov.in/

State Chief Information Commissioner
- Currently: I . Meyionen

Nagaland Information Commission is an autonomous and statutory body constituted by the state government of Nagaland through a notification in official Gazette.

== History and objective ==
Nagaland State Information Commission has to be constituted as per The Right to Information Act, 2005 by the State Governments in India through a notification in official Gazette.

Nagaland State Information Commission is formed to take up the following:

- Appeals on the information shared by various government entities under the Right to Information Act.
- Complaints on refusal to give information or in relation to inability to file Right to Information Act.
- Commission should get annual report from various departments working in the state about complaints received under Right to Information Act, 2005 and their responses on the same.

Nagaland Information Commission occasionally conducts awareness programmes on implementation of the Right to Information (RTI) Act, 2005 effectively by general public.

Nagaland Information Commission was rated as the best Information Commissions those in other states of India with only 0.7 percentage of rejected applications filed under Right to Information Act.

I . Meyionen is the current Chief Information commissioner of Nagaland Information Commission.

== Tenure and service ==
Any vacancy in the State Information Commission has to be filled within six months from the date of vacancy.

Nagaland Chief Information Commissioner (CIC), Information Commissioner (IC) and State Information Commissioner's salaries, allowances and other service terms and conditions are equivalent to a Judge of the Supreme Court.

== Powers and functions ==
The commission under powers granted to it can secure from the public authorities compliance of any of its decisions.

Commission is duty bound to receive and conduct enquiry into any complaint received from any person.

The commission has civil judicial authority for issuing summons requiring examination of any witnesses or related documents or any other prescribed matters relating to complaint.

Any provision under which summons were issued and as per which attendance is required of persons and requires them to give written or oral evidence under an oath and producing documents or other details relevant to it.

Provision requiring evidence on stamped affidavit.

Powers relating to request from any court or office of any public record.

Commission under the powers can recommend steps which can be taken for confirming to the provisions of the act if any public authority fails to do so.

== Challenges ==
Nagaland State Information Commission are overburdened with backlog cases, similar to Central Vigilance Commission. A shortage of available staff has produced a backlog of cases filed. Uttar Pradesh has the largest backlog as of October 2014. States like Mizoram, Sikkim and Tripura didn't have pending complaints. State Information Commission as per the provision has limited to provide information and cannot take any action.

In spite of above limitation, Assam State Information Commissions is critical in preserving public accountability in government and supports in greater way in checking corruption, combating oppression, preventing nepotism and misuse of the public authority.

A survey conducted by Commonwealth Human Rights Initiative, showed that most State Information Commission in India were inactive during Covid pandemic

.

== See also ==
Central Information Commission
