= Chief Information Commissioner =

Chief Information commissioner of India

Chief Information Commissioner of India

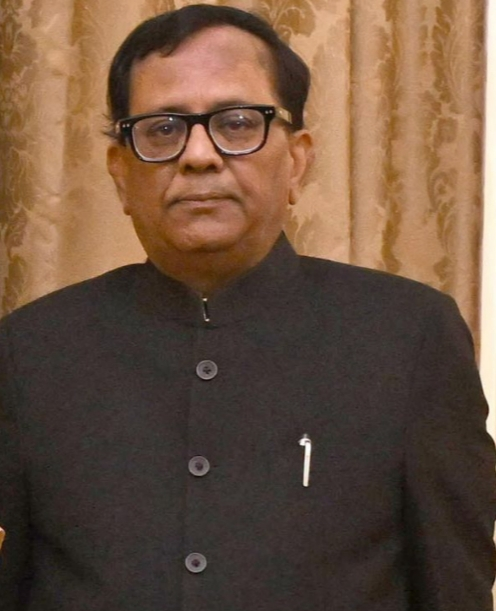
- Incumbent; Raj Kumar Goyal since 15 December 2025
- Central Information Commission
- Nominator: Committee consisting the Prime Minister, Leader of Opposition in the Lok Sabha and a Union Cabinet Minister as nominated by the Prime Minister
- Appointer: President of India
- Term length: as determined by central government
- Deputy: Information Commissioners of India; Deputy Information Commissioners of India
- Salary: ₹250,000 (US$3,500) per month
- Website: Chief Information Commissioner of India

The Chief Information Commissioner of India is the head of the Central Information Commission appointed by the President of India. The tenure of the commissioners has been cut to three years in the new rules.

The following have held the post of the Central Information Commissioners.

List of Central Information Commissioners
No.	Name	Portrait	Took office	Left office
1	Wajahat Habibullah		26 October 2005	19 September 2010
2	A. N. Tiwari		30 September 2010	18 December 2010
3	Satyananda Mishra		19 December 2010	4 September 2013
4	Deepak Sandhu(First women CIC)		5 September 2013	18 December 2013
5	Sushma Singh		19 December 2013	21 May 2014
6	Rajiv Mathur		22 May 2014	22 August 2014
7	Vijai Sharma		10 June 2015	1 December 2015
8	Radha Krishna Mathur		4 January 2016	24 November 2018
9	Sudhir Bhargava		1 January 2019	11 January 2020
10	Bimal Julka		19 February 2020	31 October 2020
11	Yashvardhan Kumar Sinha		7 November 2020	3 October 2023
12	Heeralal Samariya		6 November 2023	13 September 2025
13	Raj Kumar Goyal		15 December 2025	
