= K. A. Thippeswamy =

Indian politician (born 1948)

K.A. Thippeswamy is an Indian politician and former KAS officer who was nominated as member of Karnataka Legislative Council. He has served as State Information Commissioner of Karnataka State Information Commission.

== Personal life ==
He was born on 23 December 1948, to T. Attanna in a village of Sira Taluk. He is married to T.R. Sharadamma and has one son and one daughter.
