= Hamida Habibullah =

Indian parliamentarian, educationist, and social worker (1916–2018)

- Born: 20 November 1916; Lucknow, United Provinces of Agra and Oudh, British India
- Died: 13 March 2018 (aged 101); Lucknow, Uttar Pradesh, India
- Occupations: Parliamentarian, educationist and social worker
- Years active: 1965–2018
- Spouse: Enaith Habibullah
- Father: Nawab Nazir Yar Jung

Begum Hamida Habibullah (20 November 1916 – 13 March 2018) was an Indian parliamentarian, educationist and social worker. She has been called the iconic face of Indian womanhood in post-independence India.

== Early life and education ==
Begum Hamida Habibullah was born in Lucknow. She was the daughter of Nawab Nazir Yar Jung Bahadur, Chief Justice of Hyderabad High Court and the elder sister of three brothers. She spent her childhood and her early years in Hyderabad. She also studied for a two-year teacher training Course at Whitelands College in Putney, London.

== Personal life ==
In 1938, she married Major General Enaith Habibullah, founder commandant of National Defence Academy, Khadakvasla.

Her son, Wajahat Habibullah, is a former IAS officer as well as a former chairperson of the National Commission for Minorities, and her grandsons Amar Habibullah and Saif Habibullah are prominent businessmen.

== Political career ==
A Congress supporter, she joined active politics in 1965, after her husband's retirement. She served as an elected Member of Legislative Assembly (MLA) from Haidergarh (District Barabanki), was State Minister of Social and Harijan Welfare, National Integration & Civil Defence from 1971 to 1973, and Tourism Minister from 1971 to 1974. She was also a member of the executive committee of Uttar Pradesh Congress Committee (UPCC) until 1980 and a member of (Elected) the All India Congress Committee (AICC) from 1969. She was President of Mahila Congress, UPCC from 1972 to 1976. Thereafter, she was a member of the Rajya Sabha from 1976 to 1982.

== Educational and social career ==
After her return from London, she played a major role in furthering women's education in the region and she has been the president of the Avadh Girls' Degree College, Lucknow first English degree College for girls, since 1975. She was also President of Talimgah-E-Niswan College since 1975, a school with 3,500 catering for the education of Muslim girls founded by her mother-in-law, the late Begum Inam Habibullah.

She was also the president of SEWA Lucknow (Self Employed Women's Association), an organization for upliftment & improvement of women employing 5,000 chikan workers. She was also a member of the executive committee of Central Social Welfare Board, New Delhi, since 1987.

Hamida Habibullah was also a patron of All India Women's Conference, Nari Sewa Samiti Lucknow, Cheshire Homes India Lucknow and member of Sainik Kalyan Board Lucknow.

She was a member Of Executive Council of Lucknow University, from 1974 to 1980. She was the president UP Urdu Academy (inaugurated in 1972), founder president and re-elected 1972–76 and in 1982.

Hamida Habibullah changed the face of the mango orchards in Saidanpur. Several varieties of mango, including Maliahabadi, Dussehri, Chausa, Langda and Safeda, were planted by the Begum herself, in conformation with the guidelines of the agriculture university.

She was also the co-founder of non-governmental organization, Prajwala.
