= Goa State Information Commission =

Statutory body in Goa, India

- गोंय राज्य म्हायती आयोग
- Established: 2 March 2006
- Jurisdiction: Goa
- Location: Seventh Floor, Kamat Towers, Patto Plaza, Panaji, Goa
- Motto: Sanskrit: सूचना जनाधिकार:॥ (Soochna Janadhikaraha) transl. Information is the right of the people.
- Judge term length: 3 years from the date of entering office or up to 65 years of age (whichever is earlier)
- Website: http://www.gsic.goa.gov.in

State Chief Information Commissioner
- Currently: Aravind Kumar H Nair

State Information Commissioner
- Currently: Atmaram R Barve

The Goa State Information Commission is a statutory body which was established by the Government of Goa in accordance with Section 15 of the Right to Information Act, 2005 vide notification dated 2 March 2006.

== History ==
Goa was among the earliest states of India to enact its own State Information Act. The first states in India to enact their own State Information Acts were Tamil Nadu and Goa, in the year 1997. However, the scope of the Goa State Information Act was limited in the sense that information could be sought only to subserve the public purpose. Under the Right to Information Act, 2005, no reasons are needed to be given while seeking information.

== Constitution of the Commission ==
The Government of Goa established the Goa State Information Commission vide notification dated 2 March 2006. The Government appointed Mr. A. Venkatratnman, IAS (Retd.) as the Chief Information Commissioner and Mr. G. G. Kambli, a retired officer of the Goa Civil Services (Selection Grade) as the State Information Commission vide order dated 27 February 2006. The Chief Information Commissioner Venkatratnam and the State Information Commissioner Kambli were given the oath of office by the Chief Secretary, Government of Goa, on 21 March 2006.

Initially, the Commission was provided no premises by the Government. But since matters had been filed before the Commission right since its inception, the Commission started conducting the hearing of cases at the residence of the Chief Information Commissioner in order prevent hardships to the citizens. The Commission was not provided with even a computer and the Chief Information Commissioner Mr. Venkatratnam had typed the first order of the Commission on his own personal computer. Subsequently, the Commission was provided premises at the ground floor of the Shram Shakti Bhavan, Patto Plaza, Panaji. The premises at the Shram Shakti Bhavan was bereft of proper amenities and was not adequate. This led to severe criticism by media and the citizens.

The Goa State Information Commission was finally shifted to a new and spacious location at the seventh floor of Kamat Towers at Patto Plaza, Panaji on 12 January 2015 and the new premises was formally inaugurated at the hands of the Chief Minister of Goa, Laxmikant Parsekar. The Commission currently functions from its premises at Kamat Towers.

== Emblem ==
The Goa State Information Commission being an autonomous institution has chosen its own emblem. The Commission's emblem consists of a record of Public Authority kept open in two palms. It signifies that the Goa Information Commission acts as a facilitator for the citizens in accessing information. To convey the meaning that both the “notings” and the correspondence are available to the citizens, the record in the emblem is depicted as open. It also conveys that under the Right to Information Act, there is transparency in information. The palms holding the record are borrowed from the emblem of the Goa Government. The symbol between the pages denotes the propagation of information among the citizens.

The emblem bears the name of the Goa Information Commission in the Roman script and words “सूचना जनाधिकार:” in Sanskrit language (Devanagari script). The words in Devanagri script denote that information is the right of the masses.

== Status of Chief and State Information Commissioners ==
The Chief Information Commissioner enjoys status equivalent to that of the Election Commissioner of India while the State Information Commissioner .Officers enjoys status equivalent to that of the Chief Secretary to the State Government.

== Composition of the Commission ==
The Goa State Information Commissioner consists of a Chief Information Commissioner and two State Information Commissioners. The Commission has a Secretary and an Under Secretary too, in addition with other administrative staff and court officials including clerks, stenos, peons etc.

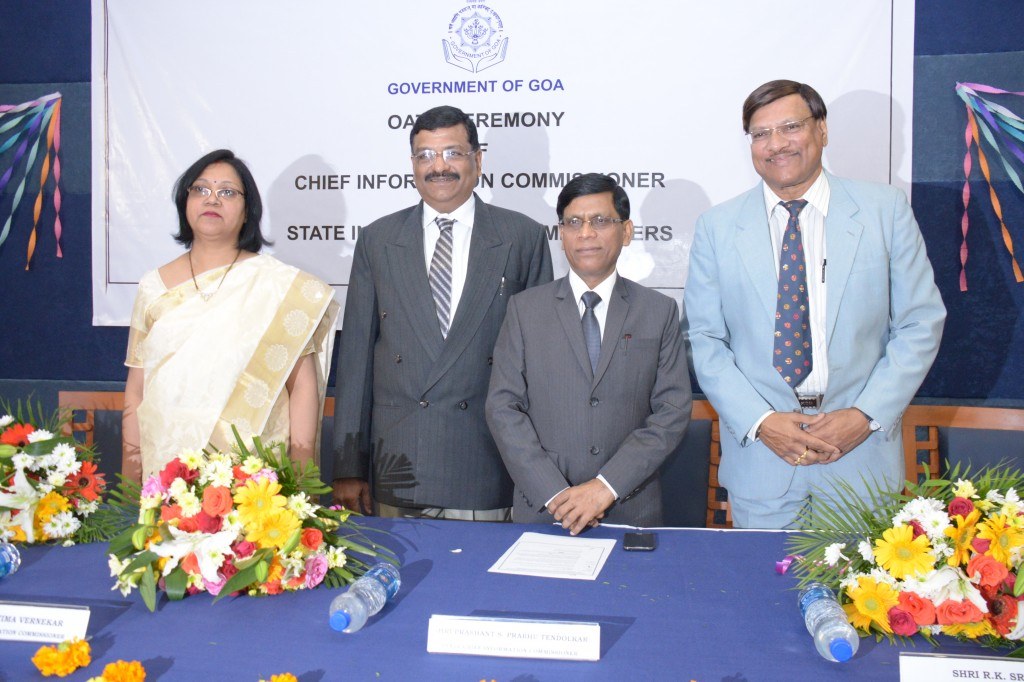
(L to R): State Information Commissioner Pratima Vernekar, State Chief Information Commissioner Prashant Sadashiv Prabhu Tendolkar, Chief Secretary of Goa R. K. Srivastava and State Information Commissioner Juino De Souza.

== List of State Chief Information Commissioners ==
List of State Chief Information Commissioners of the Goa State Information Commission
S.No.	Name	From	To
1	A. Venkatratnam	21 March 2006	8 March 2009
2	Motilal S. Keny	12 October 2009	29 July 2012
3	Leena Mehendale	24 October 2013	31 January 2015
4	Prashant Sadashiv Prabhu Tendolkar	1 January 2016	February 2020
5	Vishwas Satarkar	2 March 2021	1 March 2024
6	Aravind Kumar H Nair	18 September 2024	Till date

== List of State Information Commissioners ==
List of Chief Information Commissioners of the Goa State Information Commission
S.No.	Name	From	To
1	G. G. Kambli	21 March 2006	1 January 2009^{‡‡}
2	Afonso Araujo	4 March 2009	2 August 2010
3	Dr. Pradeep Padwal	9 August 2012	13 September 2012^{‡}
4	Pratima K. Vernekar	1 January 2016	31 December 2020
5	Juino De Souza	1 January 2016	4 July 2020
6	Sanjay Narayan Dhavalikar	2 March 2021	1 March 2024
7	Atmaram R Barve	18 September 2024	Till date

== Notes ==
- ^{‡} - Date of Resignation
- ^{‡‡} - Date of Death
