= Freedom of information act of 2002 (India) =

Freedom of Information Act, 2002 was the precursor to Right to Information Act, 2005 of Parliament of India. The main weakness of this act was that it did not acknowledge the right to information of the people. Consequently, it provided for appeals only within the government bodies. It barred the jurisdiction of the courts and did not ensure any appeal with any independent body.

== History ==
The government of India set up a working group on the right to information and promotion of open and transparent government in 1997. A people's organization in Rajasthan, Mazdoor Kisan Shakti Sangathan (MKSS) has been at the forefront of the enactment of this bill.
