= Information Commissioner of India =

Information platform

Information Commissioner of the Republic of India
- The Emblem of India

- Flag of India
- Government of India
- Reports to: Parliament
- Seat: Suchna Bhawan, New Delhi, India
- Appointer: President of India
- Term length: term as prescribed by the Central Government or until they attain the age of 65 years, whichever is earlier.
- Website: Central Information Commission of India

Information Commission, or Central Information Commission, was established in 2005 to ensure ease of access to information for Indian citizens.

The commission includes 1 Chief Information Commissioner (CIC) and not more than 10 Information Commissioners (IC) who are appointed by the President of India.

== History ==
The Central Information Commission was established 12 October 2005 under the Right to Information Act of 2005. The mission is to ensure ease of access to information to Indian citizens.
