= Gujarat State Information Commission =

Statutory body in Gujarat, India

- Established: 2 March 2006
- Jurisdiction: Gujarat
- Location: Karmayogi Bhavan, State Level Offices, Block No. 1, Second Floor, sector-10 A, Gandhinagar, Gujarat 382010.
- Motto: Sanskrit: सूचना जनाधिकार:॥ (Soochna Janadhikaraha) transl. Information is the right of the people.
- Authorised by: Right to Information Act, 2005
- Judge term length: 3 years from the date of entering office or up to 65 years of age (whichever is earlier)
- Website: https://gic.gujarat.gov.in/front-page/eStatus.aspx

State Chief Information Commissioner
- Currently: Dr Subhashchandra Soni

Gujarat State Information Commission is an autonomous and statutory body constituted by the state government of Gujarat through a notification in official Gazette.

== History and objective ==
Gujarat State Information Commission has to be constituted as per The Right to Information Act, 2005 by the State Governments in India through a notification in official Gazette.

Gujarat State Information Commission is formed to take up the following:

- Appeals on the information shared by various government entities under the Right to Information Act.
- Complaints on refusal to give information or in relation to inability to file Right to Information Act.
- Commission should get annual report from various departments working in the state about complaints received under Right to Information Act, 2005 and their responses on the same.

Gujarat Information Commission occasionally conducts awareness programmes on implementation of the Right to Information (RTI) Act, 2005 effectively by general public.

Amrutbhai Patel, IAS (Retd.) is the current Chief Information commissioner of Gujarat Information Commission.[6]

== Tenure and service ==
Any vacancy in the State Information Commission has to be filled within six months from the date of vacancy.

Gujarat Chief Information Commissioner (CIC), Information Commissioner (IC) and State Information Commissioner's salaries, allowances and other service terms and conditions are equivalent to a Judge of the Supreme Court.

== Powers and functions ==
The commission under powers granted to it can secure from the public authorities compliance of any of its decisions.

Commission is duty bound to receive and conduct enquiry into any complaint received from any person.

The commission has civil judicial authority for issuing summons requiring examination of any witnesses or related documents or any other prescribed matters relating to complaint.

Any provision under which summons were issued and as per which attendance is required of persons and requires them to give written or oral evidence under an oath and producing documents or other details relevant to it.

Provision requiring evidence on stamped affidavit.

Powers relating to request from any court or office of any public record.

Commission under the powers can recommend steps which can be taken for confirming to the provisions of the act if any public authority fails to do so.

== Challenges ==
Gujarat State Information Commission are overburdened with backlog cases, similar to Central Vigilance Commission. Due to shortage of available staff and vacancies not being filled, there is backlog of cases filed. The maximum number of appeals and complaints pending as per October 2014 records were in state of Uttar Pradesh. However, some states like Mizoram, Sikkim and Tripura didn't have pending complaints. State Information Commission as per the provision has limited to provide information and cannot take any action.

In spite of above limitation, Gujarat State Information Commissions plays a crucial role in ensuring transparency in public life and supports in greater way in checking corruption, combating oppression, preventing nepotism and misuse of the public authority.

A survey conducted by Commonwealth Human Rights Initiative, showed that most State Information Commission in India were inactive during Covid pandemic.

== Banned people from filing RTI ==
Gujarat State Information Commission banned 10 people from filing RTI queries, citing that these people were "harassing government officials" by filing multiple queries. There are no provisions under which Commissions can ban people from filing RTIs. That's why the ban was criticized as “wholly unconstitutional”.

== See also ==
Central Information Commission
