= Sushma Singh =

Indian politician

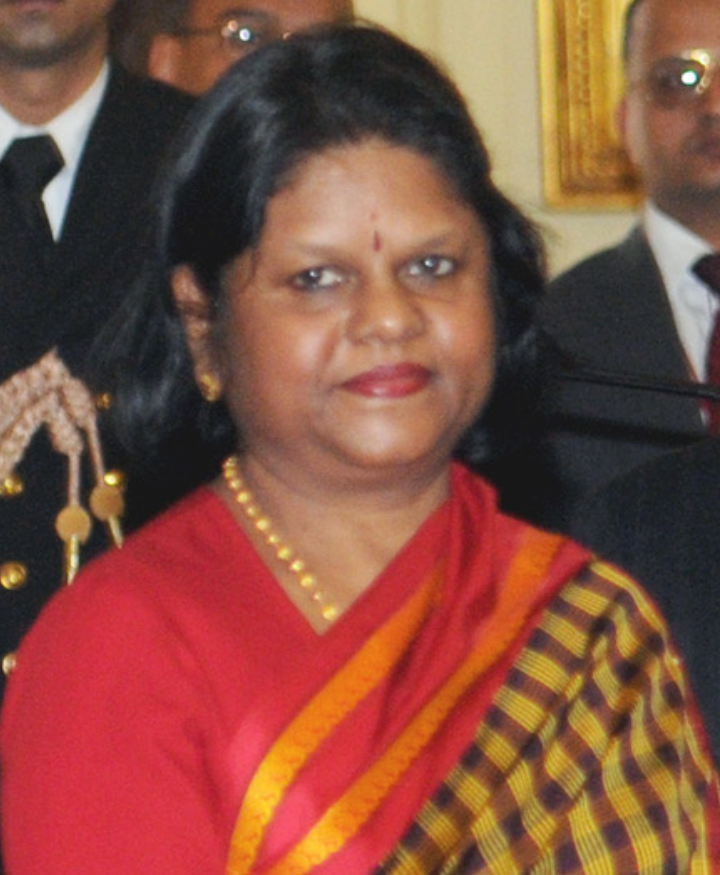

Chief Information Commissioner of India
- In office 19 December 2013 – 21 May 2014
- Preceded by: Deepak Sandhu
- Succeeded by: Rajiv Mathur

Sushma Singh is an Indian Administrative Service officer and the fifth Chief Information Commissioner of India. She succeeded Deepak Sandhu and became the second woman to be appointed as the Chief Information Commissioner.

== Professional career ==
She is a former Indian Administrative Service officer belonging to the Jharkhand cadre. She retired from Indian Administrative Service on 31 May 2009. She has served at various Secretarial positions in the Government of India namely Secretary in the Ministry of Information and Broadcasting, the Ministry of Panchayati Raj and the Ministry for the Development of the North Eastern Region (DONER). Singh became Information Commissioner on 23 September 2009 in the Central Information Commission.
