= Satyananda Mishra =

Indian Chief Information Commissioner

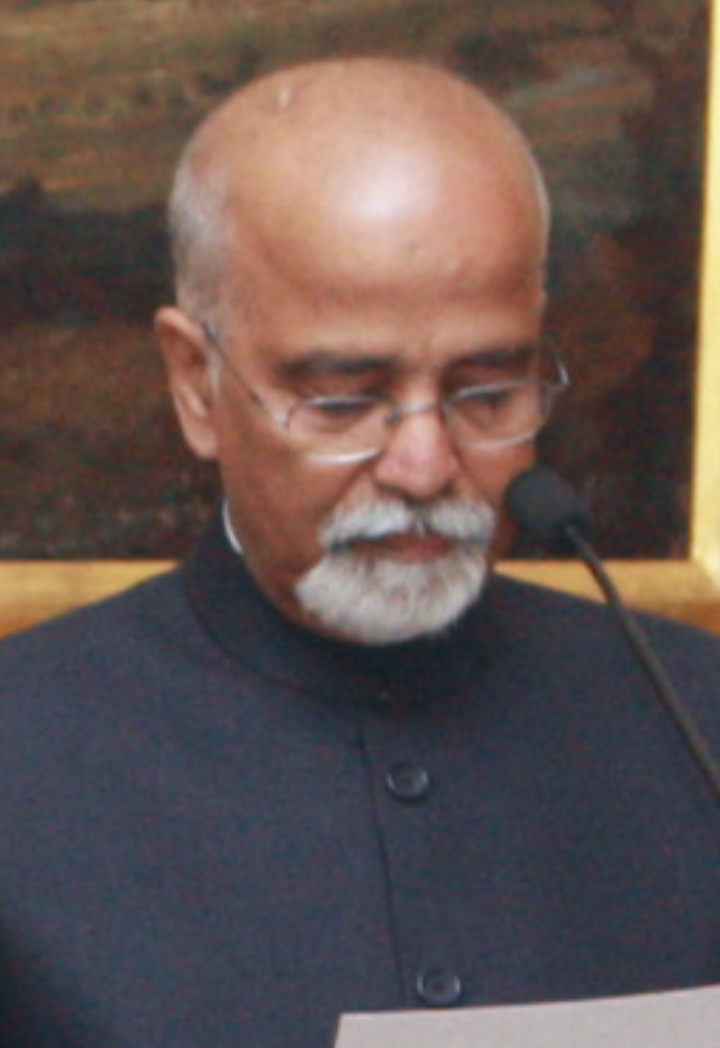

Chief Information Commissioner of India
- In office 18 December 2010 – 4 September 2013
- Preceded by: A. N. Tiwari
- Succeeded by: Deepak Sandhu

Personal details
- Born: 17 January 1949 (age 77)

Satyananda Mishra (born 1949) is the former Chief Information Commissioner of India. He is the IAS officer of 1973 batch. Satyananda Mishra has been appointed Chairman of the Multi-Commodity Exchange of India Ltd (MCX).
