= Deepak Sandhu =

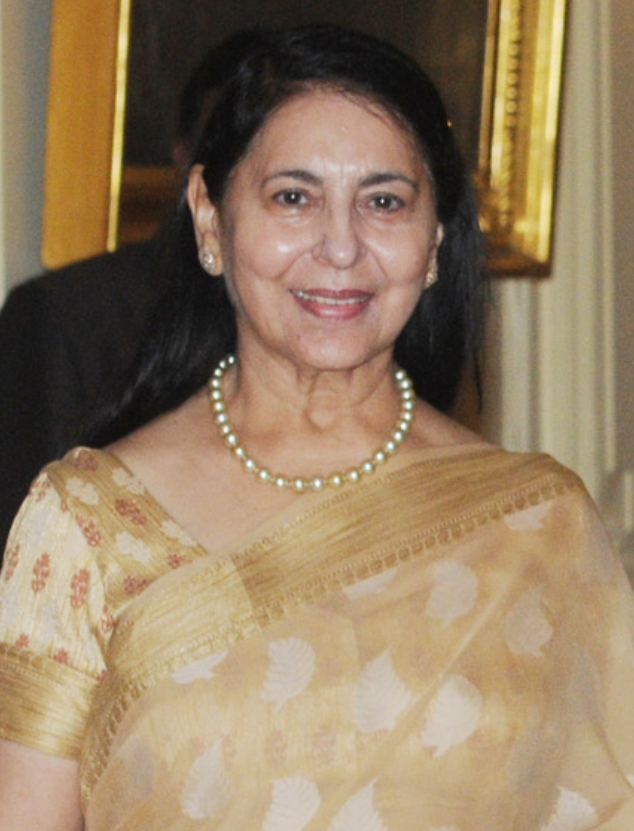

Chief Information Commissioner of India
- In office 5 September 2013 – 18 December 2013
- Preceded by: Satyananda Mishra
- Succeeded by: Sushma Singh

Personal details
- Born: 19 December 1948 (age 77)

Deepak Sandhu (born 19 December 1948) is a Civil Servant, Indian Information Service Officer of 1971 Batch. She served as the chief information commissioner of the Central Information Commission of India.

Sandhu became the first woman Chief Information Commissioner when she succeeded Satyananda Mishra on 5 September 2013. She is an Indian Information Service officer of the 1971 batch.

== Brief career ==
Deepak Sandhu enjoyed the privilege of being administered the oath of office as the first woman Chief Information Commissioner of the Central Information Commission by the President of India, Pranab Mukherjee.

Prior to taking the portfolio, she worked in posts like principal director general (Media and Communications) Press Information Bureau, director general DD News and director general (News) All India Radio. She was appointed information commissioner in 2009.

She has traveled extensively across the world representing India on varied issues, including international film festivals hosted in Cannes, Berlin, Venice and Tokyo, the International Conference on Terrorism and Electronic Mass Media at Gelendzhik, Russia and Cyprus, and the heads of news meetings at Atlanta, U.S.A., and Beijing.
