= Rajasthan Information Commission =

Statutory body in Rajasthan, India

The Rajasthan Information Commission (RIC) was established by the State Government of Rajasthan in April 2006.

RIC is the final appellate authority with regard to the matters mentioned in the Right to Information Act, 2005. Its decisions are final and binding (subject to the decision of writ in the High Court against a verdict). RIC has also been empowered to receive and inquire into written complaints from persons who have been unable to get information from any Public Information Officer (PIO), or when a PIO has refused to entertain his or her application for obtaining information. The first Rajasthan state chief information commissioner was Shri M. D. Kaurani. Shri D B Gupta is working from 11/12/2020 to till date on this post.
