= Parinamika =

- Founded: 31 March 2011
- Dissolved: July 2012
- Type: Non-political, not for profit youth organisation
- Location: Bangalore, Kolkata
- Region served: India
- Key people: Adoksh Shastry (president); Kayala Rahul (CEO); Yateesh Begoore (COO)

Parinamika was a nonprofit organisation based in Bangalore, India. Its primary focus was encouraging increased awareness of the right to information among Indian citizens. It worked with another non-profit organisation based in Kolkata, Infocracy India, on a petition campaign to introduce a chapter on the Right to Information Act, 2005, in the high school syllabus. It aimed to bring more young people into governance.
