= A. N. Tiwari =

Chief Information Commissioner of India

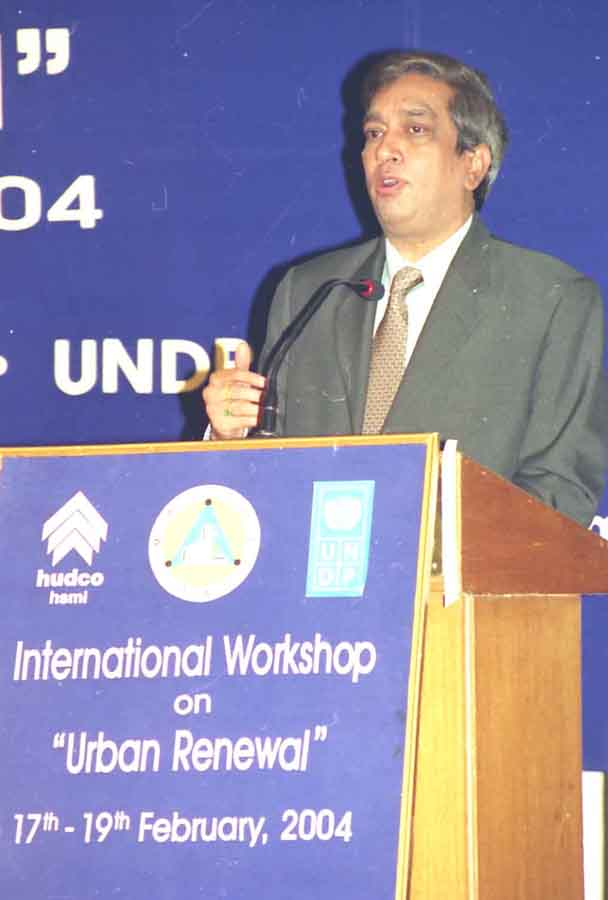

Chief Information Commissioner of India
- In office 30 September 2010 – 18 December 2010
- Preceded by: Wajahat Habibullah
- Succeeded by: Satyananda Mishra

A. N. Tiwari is the former Chief Information Commissioner of India.
