= Sudhir Bhargava =

Former Chief Information Commissioner of India

9th Chief Information Commissioner of India
- In office 1 January 2019 – 11 January 2020
- Preceded by: R. K. Mathur
- Succeeded by: Bimal Julka

Personal details
- Born: 12 January 1955 (age 71) India

Sudhir Bhargava was the ninth Chief Information Commissioner of India. He held the office from 1 January 2019 until his retirement on 11 January 2020. He had been working as one of the information commissioner since June 2015. Before that he served as secretary in the Ministry of Social Justice. He was an Indian Administrative Service bureaucrat.
