= Raj Kumar Goyal =

Chief Information Commissioner of India

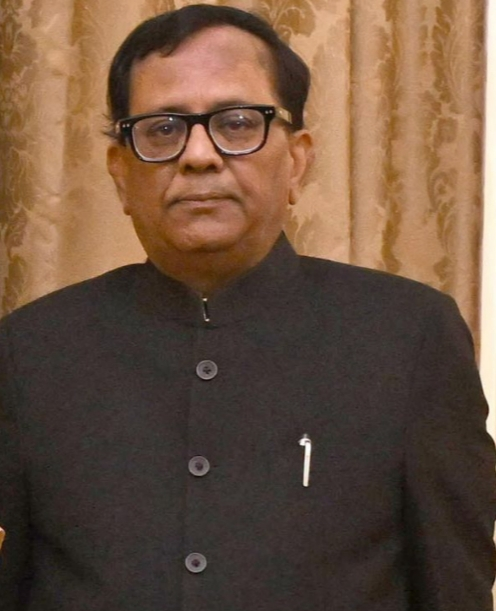

Chief Information Commissioner of India
- Incumbent
- Assumed office 15 December 2025
- Appointed by: Appointments Committee of the Cabinet
- Preceded by: Heeralal Samariya

Law Secretary of India
- In office 28 May 2024 – 31 August 2025
- Appointed by: Appointments Committee of the Cabinet
- Preceded by: S. K. G. Rahate
- Succeeded by: Niraj Verma

Secretary of Border Management Ministry of Home Affairs of India
- In office 12 February 2024 – 27 May 2024
- Appointed by: Appointments Committee of the Cabinet
- Preceded by: Atal Dulloo
- Succeeded by: Rajendra Kumar

Personal details
- Born: Raj Kumar Goyal; 10 August 1965 (age 61) India
- Education: (B.Tech) IIT Roorkee
- Occupation: Bureaucrat

Raj Kumar Goyal (born 10 August 1965) is a retired 1990 batch IAS officer of AGMUT cadre who is currently serving as the Chief Information Commissioner of India since 15 December 2025. He previously served as the Law Secretary of India.

== Early life and education ==
Raj Kumar Goyal was born on 10 August 1965 in Uttar Pradesh, India. He completed his B.Tech degree in Electronics Engineering from IIT Roorkee.

== Civil Service career ==
Goyal was an Indian Administrative Service officer of 1990 batch from the Arunachal Pradesh-Goa-Mizoram-Union Territories.

Throughout his career Goyal has served in various positions in the Jammu and Kashmir both as Principal Secretary and as Joint Secretary in the Government of Jammu and Kashmir. He then served as Secretary of Border Management in the Ministry of Home affairs of India and then as Secretary of Department of Justice in the Ministry of Law and Justice of India.

On 15 December 2025 the Government appointed Goyal as the new Chief Information Commissioner of India after months of vacancy since the September when Heeralal Samariya left.
