= Heeralal Samariya =

Former Chief Information Commissioner of India

Heeralal Samariya IAS (Retd.)
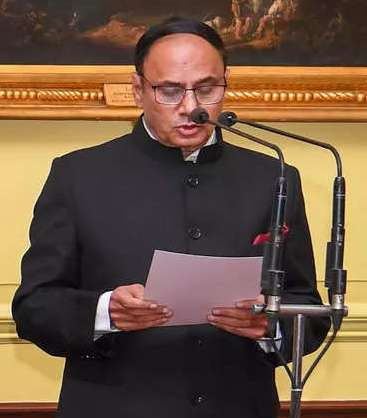

Chief Information Commissioner of India
- In office 6 November 2023 – 13 September 2025
- Preceded by: Yashvardhan Kumar Sinha
- Succeeded by: Raj Kumar Goyal

Personal details
- Born: 14 September 1960 (age 66) Bharatpur District, Rajasthan, India
- Education: (B.E.) University of Rajasthan
- Occupation: Retired IAS officer
- Profession: Bureaucrat

Heeralal Samaria (born 14 September 1960) is a retired Indian Administrative Service officer of 1985 batch. He has served as Chief Information Commissioner of India from 2023 till 2025.

== Early life ==
Heeralal Samaria was born on 14 September 1960, in a Khatik(Dalit) family of Kugra village of Bharatpur district in the state of Rajasthan.

== Career ==
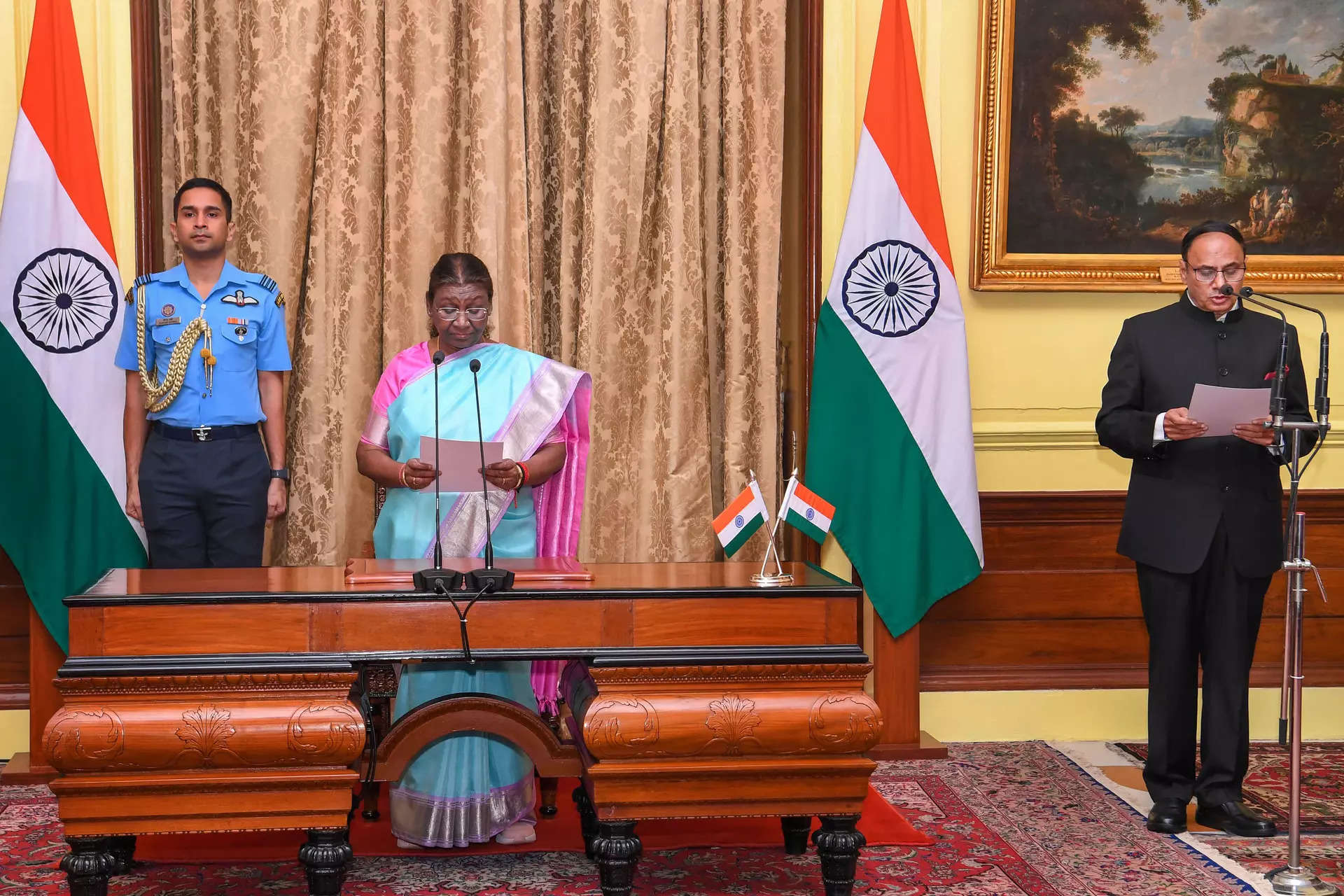
Heeralal Samariya

Heeralal, a former IAS officer of the 1985 batch of Telangana cadre, who is currently holding the post of Information Commissioner, was promoted by the central government. He was administered the oath of office by President Droupadi Murmu at a ceremony held at Rashtrapati Bhavan in New Delhi on 6 November 2023. Hiralal Samaria is recognized as the first Dalit person to take up this responsibility. He will continue in this post till 13 September 2025. He has been appointed as the Chief Commissioner of CIC for a period of two years by the central government. He previously served in various capacities in the united Andhra Pradesh and Telangana states. He served as Director of Singareni, Chairman of Southern Power Distribution Company in the electricity sector, and as Secretary in the Union Ministry of Labour and Employment. He was appointed as the Central Information Commissioner on 7 November 2020, and been promoted to the post of Chief Commissioner in year 2023 where he served till 2025.
