= Maharashtra State Information Commission =

Statutory body in Maharashtra, India

Maharashtra Information Commission
- Established: 2 March 2006
- Location: Shri Rahul Bhalchandra Pandey, Chief Information Commissioner, State Information Commission 13th Floor, New Administrative Building, Mantralaya, Mumbai 400032.
- Motto: सूचना जनाधिकार:॥ (Soochna Janadhikaraha) Information is the right of the people. (Sanskrit)
- Judge term length: 3 years from the date of entering office or up to 65 years of age (whichever is earlier)
- Website: https://sic.maharashtra.gov.in/Site/Home/Index.aspx

State Chief Information Commissioner
- Currently: Shri Rahul Pandey

Maharashtra State Information Commission Maharashtra India has been constituted under subsection (1) of section 15 of the Right to Information (RTI) Act, 2005 of Government of India. Main objective of the Commission is fulfilling the mandate assigned in the Right to Information Act, 2005.

The State Information Commission’s mandate is to exercise the powers conferred on, and to perform the functions assigned to, under the Act.

The State Information Commission consist of

- The State Chief Information Commissioner.
- The State Information Commissioners.

== Powers and duties of Officers and Employees ==
Chief State Information Commissioner

Over all management of the State Information Commission matters including general superintendence, direction and leadership. Scrutiny of appeals and complaints under Sec 19 and 18 respectively and issue of ruling where hearing has been held on appeals or complaints. Co-ordination with the different State Information Commission’s as well as with different departments of the State Government w r the Right to Information Act, 2005.

Secretary

To assist the Chief State Information Commissioner in various works and as directed by the Chief State Information Commissioner. To act as controlling Officer for Officers and staff in the State Information Commission office, Mumbai. To co-ordinate with various Government departments for matters related to the State Information Commission and the Right to Information Act, 2005.

Section Officers

Scrutiny and putting up cases follow up on decisions and instructions with respect to Right to Information Act. Scrutiny of other allotted subject with reference to office administration, financial matters etc. which may allotted from time to time.
