= Saidanpur =

- Village
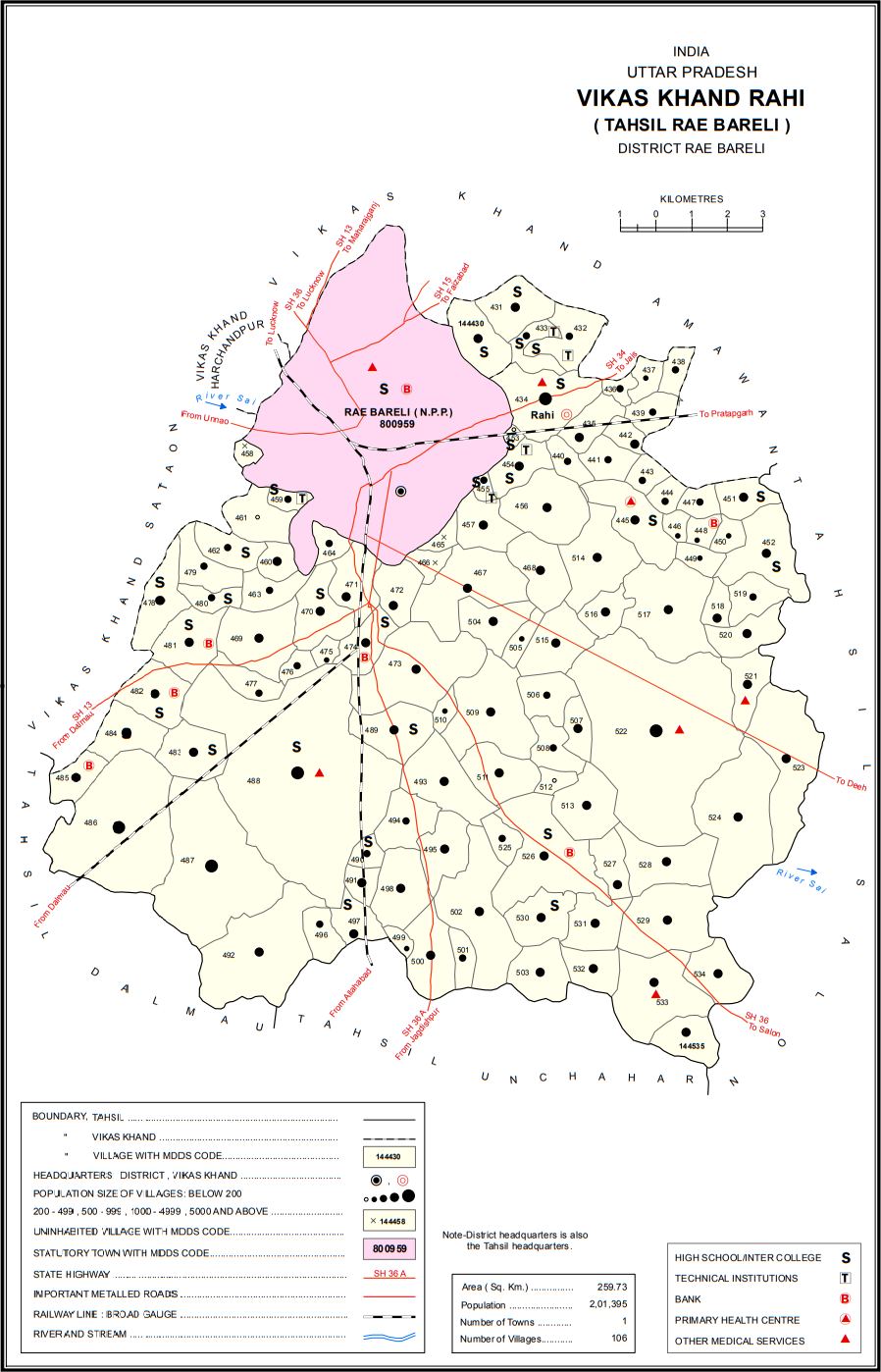
- Map showing Saidanpur (#481) in Rahi CD block

- Location in Uttar Pradesh, India
- Coordinates: 26.180106°N 81.202965°E
- Country: India
- State: Uttar Pradesh
- District: Raebareli

Area
  - Total: 2.779 km^{2} (1.073 sq mi)

Population (2011)
  - Total: 1,854
  - Density: 667.1/km^{2} (1,728/sq mi)

Languages
  - Official: Hindi
- Time zone: UTC+5:30 (IST)
- Vehicle registration: UP-35

Saidanpur is a village in Rahi block of Rae Bareli district, Uttar Pradesh, India. It is located 9 km from Rae Bareli, the district headquarters. As of 2011, it has a population of 1,854 people, in 330 households. It has one primary school and no medical facilities. It hosts a permanent market but not a weekly haat. It belongs to the nyaya panchayat of Khagipur Sandwa.

The 1951 census recorded Saidanpur as comprising 3 hamlets, with a population of 658 people (333 male and 325 female), in 156 households and 152 physical houses. The area of the village was given as 674 acres. 9 residents were literate, all male. The village was listed as belonging to the pargana of Rae Bareli South and the thana of Kotwali.

The 1961 census recorded Saidanpur as comprising 3 hamlets, with a total population of 734 people (376 male and 358 female), in 161 households and 156 physical houses. The area of the village was given as 674 acres.

The 1981 census recorded Saidanpur as having a population of 1,118 people, in 213 households, and having an area of 100.37 hectares. The main staple foods were listed as wheat and rice.

The 1991 census recorded Saidanpur as having a total population of 1,397 people (718 male and 679 female), in 250 households and 250 physical houses. The area of the village was listed as 272 hectares. Members of the 0-6 age group numbered 315, or 22.5% of the total; this group was 51% male (162) and 49% female (153). Members of scheduled castes numbered 474, or 34% of the village's total population, while no members of scheduled tribes were recorded. The literacy rate of the village was 27% (303 men and 78 women). 400 people were classified as main workers (336 men and 64 women), while 6 people were classified as marginal workers (all women); the remaining 991 residents were non-workers. The breakdown of main workers by employment category was as follows: 278 cultivators (i.e. people who owned or leased their own land); 89 agricultural labourers (i.e. people who worked someone else's land in return for payment); 0 workers in livestock, forestry, fishing, hunting, plantations, orchards, etc.; 0 in mining and quarrying; 3 household industry workers; 13 workers employed in other manufacturing, processing, service, and repair roles; 4 construction workers; 3 employed in trade and commerce; 2 employed in transport, storage, and communications; and 8 in other services.
