= Wajahat Habibullah =

Indian politician

1st Chief Information Commissioner of India
- In office 26 October 2005 – 19 September 2010
- Preceded by: Position Established
- Succeeded by: A. N. Tiwari

Personal details
- Born: 30 September 1945 (age 80)
- Parents: Enaith Habibullah (father); Hamida Habibullah (mother)

Wajahat Habibullah (born 30 September 1945) is the former chairperson of the National Commission for Minorities. Prior to this, he held the position of the first Chief Information Commissioner of India. He was an officer of the Indian Administrative Service (IAS) from 1968 until his retirement in August 2005. He was also Secretary to the Government of India in the Ministry of Panchayati Raj (Local Government).

== Personal life ==
Habibullah belongs to a prominent and progressive Taluqdari (Saidanpur taluqa, Barabanki district) family of the United Provinces. He is the son of General Enaith Habibullah, a former commandant of the NDA, Khadakwasla, and Hamida Habibullah, a parliamentarian and educationist. He was Divisional Commissioner of eight districts of the Kashmir Division in the state of Jammu and Kashmir between 1991 and 1993, which was abruptly terminated by a near fatal road accident, while negotiating with militants occupying the Hazratbal shrine in Kashmir. His children Amar Habibullah and Saif Habibullah are prominent businessmen and his wife Shahila Habibullah is a social worker. He was appointed as a member of the World Bank's Info Appeals Board in July 2010.

== Education ==
He studied at Welham Boys School then known as Welham prep school and later joined the Doon School at Dehradun, from where he also did his Senior Cambridge in 1961; Bachelor of Arts (Honours) History from St Stephens' College, University of Delhi in 1965; and Master of Arts (History) from University of Delhi in 1967. He was a member of Indian Administrative Service.

== Memberships ==
- Member, Advisory Council, Brookings Doha Center
- Member, International Advisory Council, Doha, Qatar
- Member, Advisory Council, USIP Education and Training Center, Washington DC
- Chairman, Board of Governors, National Institute of Technology, Srinagar (J&K)

== Awards ==
- Rajiv Gandhi Award for Excellence in Secularism-1994
- Gold Medal for Distinguished Service; Governor of Jammu & Kashmir-1996
- Lala Ram Mohan History Award; Delhi University-1967

== Publications ==
- The Problem Kashmir Today, a Symposium on a Troubled State; Seminar 392-April 1992, New Delhi
- Kashmir 1947; Burdens of the Past, Options for the Future: Five Perspectives; Offprint from the Center for Asian Studies, the University of Texas at Austin, 1997
- Kashmir, Rajiv Gandhi's India Vol. I Politics Ch. I the Problem Areas pp. 58–60, UBSP
- The Islands, Rajiv Gandhi's India Vol. I Politics, Ch. II The Geographic Periphery pp. 237–39, UBS Publishers, 1998, New Delhi, Mumbai, Chennai, London
- Siege: Hazratbal, Kashmir 1993, India Review, Vol. 1, No. 3 July 2002, pp. 73–98, Frank Cass, London
- The Protection of Human Rights in a Disturbed Situation, Searching for Common Ground in South Asia. Center for Pacific Asia Studies, Stockholm, 2003 pp. 31–42
- The Political Economy of the Kashmir Conflict, Special Report 121, USIP Washington DC June 2004
- "Kashmiris and the Kashmir Conflict" Review Essay, India Review, Vol 3, No. 3 July 2004, pp. 230–253. Frank Cass, London
- "Government to Citizens Relationship in the Changing Economic Scenario", Promise of e-Governance-Operational Challenges ed MP Gupta pp. 1–4, Tata McGraw Hill, New Delhi, 2004
- "My Kashmir-Conflict and the Prospects of Enduring Peace" USIP Press, Washington DC, May 2008
