= Commonwealth Human Rights Initiative =

India based international non-governmental organization

Commonwealth Human Rights Initiative (CHRI)
- Formation: 1987
- Type: INGO
- Purpose: Promote & defend human rights in the Commonwealth
- Headquarters: New Delhi, India; London, United Kingdom (regional office); Accra, Ghana (regional office)
- Official language: English
- Director-in-Charge: Venkatesh Nayak
- Staff: 50+
- Website: www.humanrightsinitiative.org

The Commonwealth Human Rights Initiative (CHRI) is an independent, non-partisan and nonprofit international non-governmental organisation which works towards the practical realisation of human rights in the countries of the Commonwealth.

CHRI's objectives are to promote awareness and adherence to the Commonwealth's Harare Declaration, to the Universal Declaration of Human Rights, to other internationally recognised human rights instruments, and to advocate for the domestic institutions supporting human rights in the Commonwealth member states.

The organisation specialises in transparency and accountability issues, with a focus on access to justice and access to information. The organisation mainly works in the South Asia, East Africa, and Ghana region. Across the 54 countries of the Commonwealth, it periodically monitors the progress and rollbacks of civil and political rights with the help of research, workshops, and cooperation with other civil society networks. In 2017, the NGO consists of over 50 employees and interns, working in New Delhi, London, and Accra.

== Creation and History ==
The CHRI was founded in 1987 by six existing Commonwealth NGOs: the Commonwealth Lawyers Association, Commonwealth Legal Education Association, Commonwealth Journalists Association, Commonwealth Parliamentary Association, Commonwealth Press Union and the Commonwealth Broadcasting Association. CHRI was founded on the consensus that, while Commonwealth countries had a common set of values and a forum from which to work, there was little focus on human rights issues.

The shift in headquarters from London to New Delhi was a conscious decision, guided by the need to be based in the developing 'South'. CHRI has since grown and is now a family of offices in Delhi, London and Accra. The office in Accra, Ghana, coordinates work in Africa and a small office in London acts as a liaison office. Each office is registered as a separate legal entity under the laws of the country in which it is located.

The organisation is officially accredited to the Commonwealth, has observer status with the African Commission on Human and Peoples' Rights and also has consultative status with the United Nations Economic and Social Council. The CHRI is also a member of the Commonwealth Family network of NGOs and often collaborates with the United Nations Human Rights Council.

== Principles and Objectives ==
CHRI is mainly involved in the fight against the following human rights violations:

- Torture in police custody
- Enforced disappearances
- Arbitrary arrest and detention
- Corruption
- Death in custody
- Extrajudicial killings
- Unethical Prison conditions
- Modern slavery
- Denial of the right to information

The organisation also advocates for the following:

- Right to information
- Prison reform
- Police reform
- Protection of Human Rights Defenders and Promoters
- Democracy
- Freedom of the press
- Civil and political rights
- Government transparency and accountability

== Areas of work ==
CHRI consists mainly of three programmes: the Access to Information Programme, the Access to Justice Programme (police reform and prison reform) and the International Advocacy and Programming (IAP) unit.

=== Access to Information (ATI) ===
The Access to Information Programme works to protect the right to information (RTI) in Commonwealth countries. The team conducts workshops and training sessions for government servants and members of civil society organisations in order to develop their skills and build their capacities. The programme also hosts public education campaigns in order to raise awareness on the importance of the right to information.

Internationally, the ATI team works with local partners to lobby for RTI legislation in Commonwealth countries which do not have them. The team also provides technical assistance to countries drafting Freedom of Information (FoI) Bills. In India, The ATI programme is well known for having actively participated in the passage and implementation of the new right to information Bill.

=== Access to Justice (ATJ) ===
CHRI's programme Access to Justice Programme works towards developing accountability and transparency in Commonwealth judicial systems. The programme is divided into two branches: police reform and prison reform.

In the police reform programme, CHRI aims to increase demand for a rights-based police reform and to strengthen police accountability. The team does this with research, policy analysis, accountability monitoring, public education campaigns, and with civil society networking. The programme has a focus on creating long-term structural changes to policing and accountability systems, this in order to improve accountability, transparency, and performance. The organisation works to ensure that policing laws conform to internationally recognised human rights standards and to the best international practices.

In India, nearly 67% of prisoners are still on remand. These prisoners are often forgotten, locked in overcrowded prisons for years. To solve this kind of issue, the prison reform programme seeks to increase jail transparency and to facilitate access to legal aid for prisoners. The team also aims to reform prison management, monitors Commonwealth jail conditions and encourages a better cooperation between the different judicial system branches.

=== International Advocacy and Programming (IAP) ===
The International Advocacy and Programming (IAP) unit was created in November 2017 by renaming from the former Strategic Initiatives Programme (SIP), which was expanded to include representatives from CHRI's London and Accra offices. IAP operates through several strategic interventions that together have a positive impact on human rights in the Commonwealth. IAP engages with official Commonwealth institutions with the aim of holding the Commonwealth accountable to its human rights commitments. IAP also works on the United Nations Human Rights Council and the role that the Commonwealth plays in this premier global human rights body. IAP attempts to strengthen National Human Rights Institutions in the Commonwealth and encourages partnerships between these institutions and human rights groups.

== Governance ==
CHRI has an International Advisory Commission made up of eminent people from across the Commonwealth. This Commission sets the policy directions for the organisation as a whole. Each office is governed by a separate Executive Committee. For cohesion, the Chairs of the Executive Committees also sit on the International Advisory Commission.

=== Members ===
Members of the International Advisory Commission:

- Alison Duxbury
- Wajahat Habibullah
- Sam Okudzeto
- Sanjoy Hazarika
- Joanna Ewart-James

Members of the executive committee in India:

- Wajahat Habibullah
- B.K. Chandrashekar
- Nitin Desai
- Kamala Kumar
- Poonam Muttreja
- Ruma Pal
- Jacob Punnoose
- A.P. Shah
- Vineeta Rai
- Maja Daruwala
- Sanjoy Hazarika

Members of the Executive Committee United Kingdom:

- Pralab Barua
- Joanna Ewart-James
- Owen Tudor
- Emma Kerr
- Hannah Ratcliffe
- Sanjoy Hazarika

Members of the executive committee in Ghana:

- Sam Okudzeto
- Akoto Ampaw
- Yashpal Ghai
- Wajahat Habibullah
- Neville Linton
- Kofi Quashigah
- Juliette Tuakli
- Sanjoy Hazarika

== Publications ==
Since its inception, CHRI has published over 100 reports covering human rights issues in Commonwealth countries. The NGO also publishes thematic reports biennially, with these publications mentioned over 160 times in newspapers. Some of the most popular are:

- Rwanda's Application for Membership in the Commonwealth – Report & Recommendations of CHRI (2009)
- The Commonwealth at the Human Rights Council: A Decade of Voting (2006–2016)
- Looking Into the Haze: A Study on Prison Monitoring in India
- Circle of Justice: A National Report on Undertrial Review Committees
- Easier Said than Done: A report on the commitments and performances of Commonwealth countries at the United Nations Human Rights Council
- Crime Victimisation and Safety Perception
- Inside Haryana Prisons
