= Farooq Khan =

Indian Police Service Officer

Farooq Khan IPS
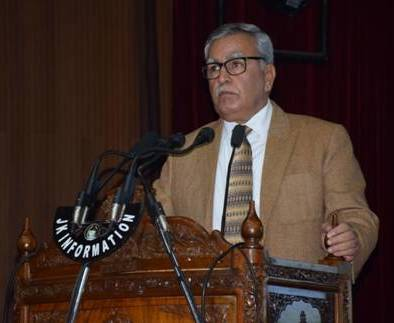
- Farooq Khan in December 2019

Advisor to Lieutenant Governor of Jammu and Kashmir
- Incumbent
- Assumed office 16 July 2019

Administrator of Lakshadweep
- In office 6 September 2016 – 18 July 2019
- Preceded by: Vijay Kumar
- Succeeded by: Mihir Vardhan

Indian Police Service
- In office 1984–2013

Personal details
- Born: 1955 (age 70–71)
- Occupation: Civil Servant
- Known for: Creating the JKP anti-militancy Task Force or Special Task Force in 1994; later known as Special Operations Group (SOG)

Sardar Farooq Khan (born 1955) is an Indian politician and former police officer who served with the Indian Police Service (IPS). He retired in 2013 as Inspector General of Police (IGP), Jammu and head of the Sher-I-Kashmir Police Academy at Udhampur. Khan is known for the creation of the Jammu and Kashmir Police (JKP) Special Task Force (STF) as well as being its first head in 1995; STF would later go on to be renamed as the Special Operations Group (SOG).

He joined Bharatiya Janata Party (BJP) in 2014 and was appointed the national secretary of the party in June 2015. He also served as the 32nd Administrator of Lakshadweep till July 2019. Following this he was advisor to governor Satya Pal Malik, after which he was an advisor to the first Lieutenant Governor of Jammu and Kashmir and currently holds the position.

== Background ==
Farooq Khan is a Dogri-speaking Muslim of the Indian state of Jammu and Kashmir. Farooq comes from a police background, his father, Sardar Mohammed Sarwar Khan, was also a police officer, who retired as a Superintendent of Police. His mother is Khalida Begum; and he has one brother and two sisters. His grandfather, Colonel Peer Mohammad, was the first state president of the Jammu and Kashmir Bharatiya Jana Sangh. As part of Hari Singh's Dogra army, Colonel Peer Mohammad also had a major role in the Indo-Pakistani War of 1947–1948.

== Life ==
=== Career in police ===
==== Creation of JKP Special Operations Group ====
Khan was first part of the Kashmir Police Service in 1984, and went on to get his first field posting as Sub-Divisional Police Officer in Bhaderwah in 1986. In the 1990s, militancy in Kashmir was at a peak. State institutions including those for law and order enforcement barely functioned. In mid-1993, the force saw indiscipline in the form of a strike in PCR Srinagar. Farooq Khan, a junior Superintendent of Police at the time, was one of the officers responsible for building up the police force again. It was only in November 1993 when the police started taking an effective part in counter-insurgency operations in the region along with the other security forces. It was at this time when the JKP felt the need for creating an elite unit with commando like capabilities that could perform counter-terrorism operations. The concept was of "involving the passive Jammu and Kashmir Police in anti-terrorist activities and giving a local face to these operations". This group would be called the JKP anti-militancy Task Force or Special Task Force. The STF would later be renamed the Special Operations Group. Khan was the first head of STF in 1994. Khan had the backing of the Director-General of Police at the time, M.N. Sabharwal. The first time the STF tasted success was in a joint operation with the 26 Punjab Regiment in which three Al-Fatah militants were killed in October 1994. In 1995, the STF had only one Srinagar based unit headed by Farooq Khan but the concept was soon expanded following its "spectacular successes" in the valley.

In 1994, Khan had shifted to the Indian Police Service. As an IPS officer in-charge of the STF he had an important part in the clearing of the Hazratbal Shrine in March 1996. Jammu Kashmir Liberation Front (JKLF) militants had laid siege to the shrine and had taken hostages. After a three-day standoff, nine militants and two policemen were killed while 20 militants surrendered. Some time later, Indian security forces went on to kill 22 militants who were holed up in the shrine. Under Farooq Khan's STF, with the support of other security agencies including the Army, the counter-insurgent pro-government militia Ikhwanul Muslimoon (Ikhwan), (Note: Ikhwanul Muslimoon was a breakaway of Ikhwan ul Muslimeen) started by Kuka Parray, was strengthened and together they killed more than 2000 militants. Khan's STF and the Army have been given credit for making possible the first elections in the 1990s in the region - the 1996 Jammu and Kashmir Legislative Assembly election and the 1996 Indian general election in Jammu and Kashmir. Khan was also part of operations against militants who had attacked the Raghunath Temple, Jammu and Panjbakhtar Temple, Jammu in late 2002.

==== Chattisinghpora, Pathribal, and Barakpora case ====
When Farooq Khan was a Senior Superintendent of Police (SSP), Anantnag, he was suspended for two years in 2003 for his alleged role in Pathribal fake encounter on 25 March 2000. In the encounter, the Indian Army claimed to have killed 5 militants responsible for the killing of 36 Sikhs in Chattisinghpora village, Anantnag, on 20 March 2000. In a related incident on 3 April 2000, 8 demonstrators were killed by SOG men in Brakpora, Anantnag. Farooq Abdullah set up a commission to look into the incidents. The Kuchai Commission, under retired Justice GA Kuchai of Jammu and Kashmir High Court, found SSP Farooq Khan responsible for falsifying the DNA reports of the victims. The commission submitted its report in December 2002. Following this another commission, the Justice SR Pandian commission, a retired Supreme Court judge, looked into the case, and while it again found multiple people guilty, it found that Farooq was not involved in the killings or in fudging of DNA. After more public outrage, the case was handed to the Central Bureau of Investigation (CBI) which started its investigation on 14 February 2003. In 2006 the CBI filed its chargesheet holding seven soldiers of Rashtriya Rifles 7th battalion responsible for the Pathribal fake encounter. Now that Farooq Khan was absolved by charges by both the Pandian commission and the CBI investigation, he was reinstated into the police force. Khan had also approached the Central Administrative Tribunal as well as the Jammu and Kashmir High Court for justice, after which the Ministry of Home Affairs cleared his name. In the end no one was found guilty for the three incidents after the Army fought the case in the Supreme Court of India.

Khan retired as IGP Jammu and as the head of the Sher-e-Kashmir Police Academy, Udhampur.

=== Joined Bharatiya Janata Party ===
Khan joined the Bharatiya Janata Party (BJP) on 26 March 2014, before the 2014 Indian general elections, during a political rally in Hiranagar, Kathua district in the presence of Narendra Modi. In June 2015 he was appointed national secretary of the Bharatiya Janata Party. Farooq, apart from being a BJP spokesperson, has also been in-charge of BJP Minority Morcha and BJP's affairs in farthest North-Eastern state of Nagaland. Khan has also commented on the Rashtriya Swayamsevak Sangh (RSS), calling RSS "leaders disciplined and dedicated" and justifies his support by saying "What’s wrong in standing for Hindutva? Are there not organisations that stand for Islam, Christianity? Just because Hindus are majority, you cannot say standing for them is a crime."

=== Administrator of Lakshadweep ===
Khan was the 32nd Administrator of the Union Territory of Lakshadweep between September 2016 and July 2019. He arrived in Lakshadweep on 12 September 2016. As Lakshadweep Administrator, he was in-charge of relief work after cyclones hit the islands in 2017. He inaugurated the "Lakshadweep District Panchayat Bhavan" as well as the "Annual Academic Conference of Principal and Headmasters." As part of other routine functions of the Administrator, he also hurled the flag on the formation day of Lakshadweep on 1 November. Under Farooq Khan, the "branding of Lakshadweep" was pushed, with the aim of marketing products from Lakshadweep to the world. The foundation stone of the "world’s first ever Ocean Thermal Energy Conversion (OTEC) Powered Desalination Project" was laid in Kavaratti by Union Minister Harsh Vardhan in the presence of Farooq Khan.

=== Advisor to JK Governor/ Lieutenant Governor ===
On 13 July 2019, Farooq Khan was appointed as the fifth advisor to the then Governor of Jammu and Kashmir, Satya Pal Malik. Farooq Khan was the first advisor to Governor Satya Pal Malik to request withdrawal of his security convoy. Following this he was adviser to Lieutenant Governor G. C. Murmu, and then Lieutenant Governor Manoj Sinha. As advisor, his official role is related to "food civil supplies and consumer affairs, social welfare, tribal affairs, labour and employment, youth services and sports, election and Haj and Auqaf" among other things.

== Recognition ==
Khan is a recipient of the President's medals for gallantry, bravery and distinguished service. He has also been given commendations by the Indian Army and other agencies.

== See also ==
- Shesh Paul Vaid
