= Sonawari Assembly constituency =

Constituency of the Jammu and Kashmir legislative assembly in India

Coordinates: 34.23°N 74.65°E

Sonawari
- Constituency No. 14 for the Jammu and Kashmir Legislative Assembly

Constituency details
- Country: India
- State: Jammu and Kashmir
- District: Bandipora
- Lok Sabha constituency: Baramulla
- Established: 1967
- Total electors: 99,490 (2014)

Member of Legislative Assembly
- Incumbent Hilal Akbar Lone
- Party: Jammu and Kashmir National Conference
- Elected year: 2024

Sonawari Assembly constituency is located in Bandipura district of Jammu and Kashmir. Sonawari assembly constituency is part of the Baramulla parliamentary area. There were 99,490 voters in the Sonawari constituency in 2014. It has been represented by JKNC candidate Hilal Akbar Lone.

== Members of the Legislative Assembly ==
Election	Member	Party
1962	Abdul Khaliq Bhat	Jammu & Kashmir National Conference
1967	Abdul Aziz Parray	Indian National Congress
1972	Abdul Aziz Parray	Indian National Congress
1977	Abdul Aziz Parray	Jammu & Kashmir National Conference
1983	Ghulam Rasool Bahar	Jammu & Kashmir National Conference
1987	Mohammed Ud-Din Kochey	Jammu & Kashmir National Conference
1996	Mohammed Yousuf Parray	Jammu and Kashmir Awami League
2002	Mohammad Akbar Lone	Jammu & Kashmir National Conference
2008	Mohammad Akbar Lone	Jammu & Kashmir National Conference
2014	Mohammad Akbar Lone	Jammu & Kashmir National Conference
2024	Hilal Akbar Lone	Jammu and Kashmir National Conference

== Election results ==
=== Assembly Election 2024 ===
2024 Jammu and Kashmir Legislative Assembly election : Sonawari
Party	Candidate	Votes	%	±%
JKNC	Hilal Akbar Lone	31,535	37.07%	New
Independent	Yasir Reshi	17,791	20.91%	New
JKAP	Imtiyaz Ahmad Parray	17,608	20.70%	New
JKPDP	Mohammad Tahir Qadri	3,773	4.43%	▼35.59
Independent	Abdul Majeed Sheikh	3,422	4.02%	New
Independent	Syed Mohammad	2,051	2.41%	New
Independent	Saheer Ahmad Rather	1,807	2.12%	New
Independent	Shabir Ahmad Mir	1,382	1.62%	New
Independent	Wazir Ahmad Qureshi	1,245	1.46%	New
BJP	Abdul Rashid Khan	1,024	1.20%	▼2.02
NOTA	None of the Above	846	0.99%	▼0.34
Margin of victory		13,744	16.15%	▲15.65
Turnout		85,077	70.33%	▼10.44
Registered electors		1,20,963		▲21.58
JKNC gain from JKNC		Swing	▼3.46	

=== Assembly Election 2014 ===
2014 Jammu and Kashmir Legislative Assembly election : Sonawari
Party	Candidate	Votes	%	±%
JKNC	Mohammad Akbar Lone	32,567	40.53%	▲0.78
JKPDP	Yasir Reshi	32,161	40.02%	▲28.19
JKPDP	Mohammad Ashraf Mir	14,283	41.88%	▲30.05
INC	Imtiyaz Ahmad Parray	12,065	15.01%	▲8.65
JKNC	Omar Abdullah	9,500	27.85%	▼11.89
Independent	Peer Bilal Ahmad	4,394	12.88%	New
JKPC	Laldin Mir	1,996	5.85%	New
JKPC	Qawamudin Sheikh	1,174	1.46%	New
BJP	Darakhshan Andrabi	1,100	3.23%	New
NOTA	None of the Above	1,075	1.34%	New
INC	Khem Lata Wakhlu	808	2.37%	▼3.99
Margin of victory		406	0.51%	▼23.52
Turnout		80,359	80.77%	▲20.83
Registered electors		99,490		▲17.88
JKNC hold		Swing	▲0.78	

=== Assembly Election 2008 ===
2008 Jammu and Kashmir Legislative Assembly election : Sonawari
Party	Candidate	Votes	%	±%
JKNC	Mohammad Akbar Lone	20,108	39.74%	▼18.31
Independent	Abid Hussain Ansari	7,951	15.71%	New
JKAL	Imtiyaz Ahmad Parray	6,472	12.79%	▼16.43
JKPDP	Yasir Reshi	5,985	11.83%	▲5.93
INC	Ghulam Hassan Dar	3,218	6.36%	New
Independent	Mohammed Aslam Fafoo	929	1.84%	New
Independent	Abdul Majid Lone	838	1.66%	New
Independent	Mohammed Maqbool Malla	534	1.06%	New
LJP	Abdul Aziz Hurra	528	1.04%	New
People's Democratic Front (Jammu and Kashmir)	Syed Abbas	493	0.97%	New
Independent	Zahoor Ahmed Mir	465	0.92%	New
Margin of victory		12,157	24.03%	▼4.81
Turnout		50,595	59.95%	▲3.44
Registered electors		84,402		▲7.79
JKNC hold		Swing	▼18.31	

=== Assembly Election 2002 ===
2002 Jammu and Kashmir Legislative Assembly election : Sonawari
Party	Candidate	Votes	%	±%
JKNC	Mohammad Akbar Lone	25,687	58.05%	▲18.82
JKAL	Mohammad Yusuf Parray	12,929	29.22%	▼11.93
JKPDP	Abdul Rashid Rather	2,610	5.90%	New
Independent	Abdul Khaliq Hanief	1,368	3.09%	New
Independent	Ghulam Mohammed Mir	1,029	2.33%	New
JD(U)	Abdul Majid Mir	623	1.41%	New
Margin of victory		12,758	28.83%	▲26.92
Turnout		44,246	56.51%	▼2.96
Registered electors		78,299		▲22.82
JKNC gain from JKAL		Swing	▲16.90	

=== Assembly Election 1996 ===
1996 Jammu and Kashmir Legislative Assembly election : Sonawari
Party	Candidate	Votes	%	±%
JKAL	Mohammad Yusuf Parray	15,601	41.15%	New
JKNC	Mohammad Akbar Lone	14,875	39.24%	▼28.29
Independent	Qasim	7,045	18.58%	New
INC	Shafiq Ahmad Pandith	389	1.03%	New
Margin of victory		726	1.92%	▼37.55
Turnout		37,910	60.94%	▼16.05
Registered electors		63,750		▲21.22
JKAL gain from JKNC		Swing	▼26.37	

=== Assembly Election 1987 ===
1987 Jammu and Kashmir Legislative Assembly election : Sonawari
Party	Candidate	Votes	%	±%
JKNC	Mohammed Ud-Din Kochey	26,819	67.53%	▲9.22
Independent	Abdul Khaliq Haneef	11,146	28.06%	New
JKNC	Abdul Rahim Kalloo	869	2.19%	▼56.11
JKNPP	Mohammed Abdulah Hajam	309	0.78%	New
Independent	Mohammed Sabir Lone	270	0.68%	New
Margin of victory		15,673	39.46%	▲1.80
Turnout		39,716	76.98%	▲1.11
Registered electors		52,591		▲18.55
JKNC hold		Swing	▲9.22	

=== Assembly Election 1983 ===
1983 Jammu and Kashmir Legislative Assembly election : Sonawari
Party	Candidate	Votes	%	±%
JKNC	Ghulam Rasool Bahar	19,245	58.30%	▼9.68
INC	Abdul Aziz Parray	6,813	20.64%	New
JKNC	Mohammad Akbar Lone	5,470	16.57%	▼51.42
JI	Ali Mohammed Ganayee	1,481	4.49%	New
Margin of victory		12,432	37.66%	▲1.69
Turnout		33,009	78.47%	▼5.96
Registered electors		44,363		▲15.02
JKNC hold		Swing	▼9.68	

=== Assembly Election 1977 ===
1977 Jammu and Kashmir Legislative Assembly election : Sonawari
Party	Candidate	Votes	%	±%
JKNC	Abdul Aziz Parray	21,074	67.99%	New
JP	Mohammad Akbar Lone	9,923	32.01%	New
Margin of victory		11,151	35.97%	▼39.64
Turnout		30,997	84.98%	▲5.03
Registered electors		38,570		▼1.48
JKNC gain from INC		Swing		

=== Assembly Election 1972 ===
1972 Jammu and Kashmir Legislative Assembly election : Sonawari
Party	Candidate	Votes	%	±%
INC	Abdul Aziz Parray	25,121	85.17%	▲20.10
JI	Abdul Khaliq Parray	2,819	9.56%	New
Independent	Ghulam Mohammed Bhat	1,554	5.27%	New
Margin of victory		22,302	75.62%	▲45.48
Turnout		29,494	76.51%	▲14.30
Registered electors		39,151		▲14.64
INC hold		Swing		

=== Assembly Election 1967 ===
1967 Jammu and Kashmir Legislative Assembly election : Sonawari
Party	Candidate	Votes	%	±%
INC	Abdul Aziz Parray	13,563	65.07%	New
JKNC	G. Rather	7,281	34.93%	New
Margin of victory		6,282	30.14%	
Turnout		20,844	63.13%	▲61.04
Registered electors		34,150		▲45.11
INC gain from JKNC		Swing		

=== Assembly Election 1962 ===
1962 Jammu and Kashmir Legislative Assembly election : Sonawari
Party	Candidate	Votes	%	±%
JKNC	Abdul Khaliq Bhat	Unopposed		
Registered electors		23,534		
JKNC win (new seat)				
