= Director of the Intelligence Bureau =

Chief executive of the Intelligence Bureau in India

Director of Intelligence Bureau of India
- Logo of IB

- Flag of India

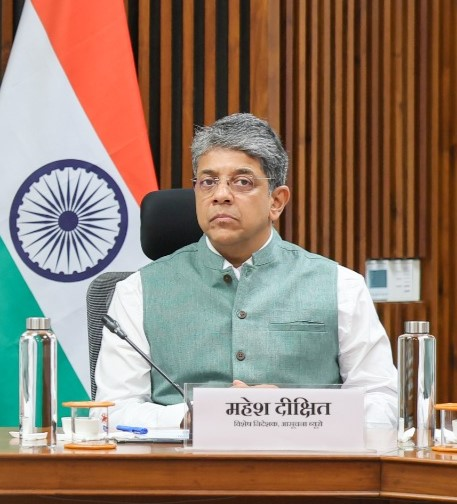
- Incumbent; Mahesh Dixit, IPS since 1 July 2026
- Ministry of Home Affairs; Intelligence Bureau
- Status: Head of IB
- Member of: Strategic Policy Group; National Security Council
- Reports to: Prime Minister of India; Union Home Minister; National Security Advisor; Home Secretary
- Residence: Classified
- Seat: Ministry of Home Affairs, New Delhi
- Appointer: Appointments Committee of the Cabinet
- Term length: Typically 2 years (extendable)
- Inaugural holder: T. G. Sanjeevi Pillai
- Formation: 1887
- Succession: 25th (on the Indian order of precedence)
- Salary: ₹225,000 (US$2,400) monthly
- Website: Classified

The Director of the Intelligence Bureau (DIB) is the head of the Intelligence Bureau, India's premier domestic intelligence agency. The current director of the Intelligence Bureau is Mahesh Dixit, incumbent since 1 July 2026.

Since the bureau's inception, the office has always been held by an Indian Police Service officer. It is the highest rank attainable by any member of the service; the director of the Intelligence Bureau is therefore at any given time, the senior-most police officer in India.

== Authority ==
The DIB serves as the principal advisor to the Government of India on internal security, counter-terrorism, counter-insurgency, and counter-intelligence matters. Key responsibilities include:

- Policy and Advisory Role: The DIB is an ex-officio member of the Strategic Policy Group (SPG) and coordinates closely with the National Security Council Secretariat (NSCS). Operational intelligence inputs are routed through the Ministry of Home Affairs (MHA) as well as directly to the Prime Minister's Office and the National Security Advisor.
- Intelligence Coordination: The director oversees the Multi-Agency Centre (MAC), the nodal platform established after the Kargil War to share real-time counter-terrorism intelligence among central agencies and state police forces.
- Rank and Protocol: Placed at 25th on the Indian order of precedence (equivalent to a Secretary to the Government of India), the DIB holds the status of a four-star officer. Although entitled to wear the four-star IPS uniform insignia (crossed sword and baton with the national emblem), the DIB operates in civilian attire by convention and does not don a uniform even on ceremonial occasions.
Rank and insignia

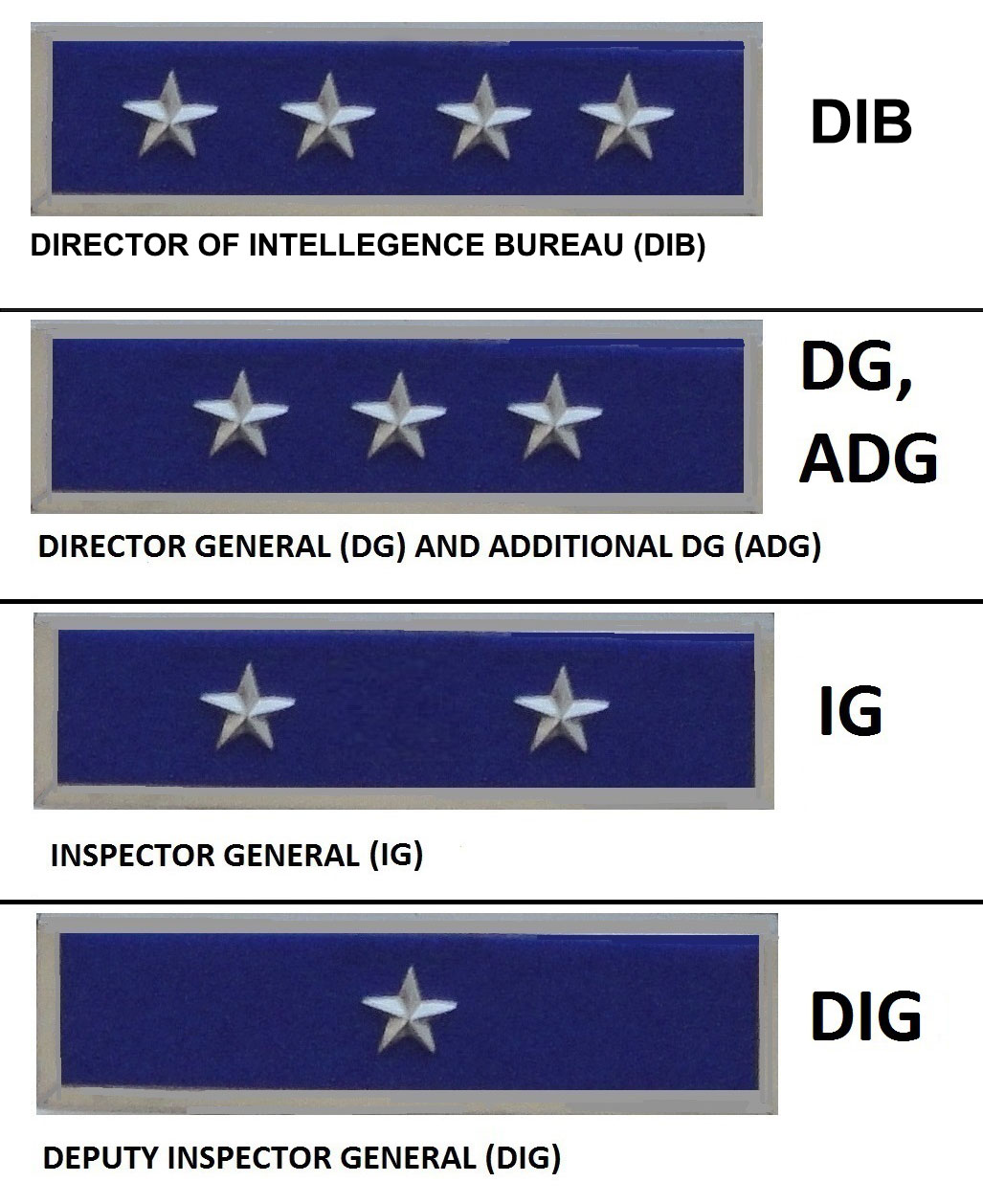
Stars plate used on the Police officer's official vehicle based on ranking.

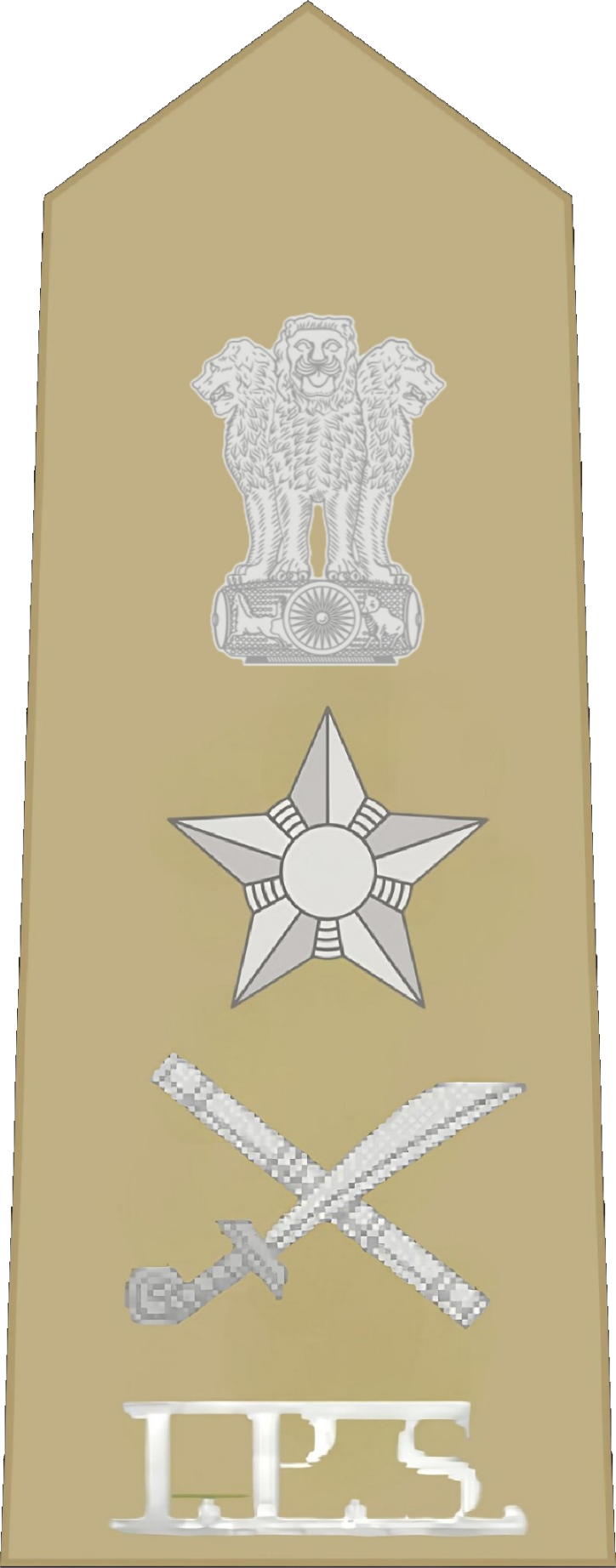
Shoulder insignia of the Director of Intelligence Bureau

== List of directors ==
List of Directors of the Intelligence Bureau
No.	Photo	Director	Took office	Left office	Notes
1		T. G. Sanjeevi Pillai	12 April 1947	14 July 1950	First Indian director; oversaw post-independence transition
2		B. N. Mullik	15 July 1950	9 October 1964	Longest-serving director (over 14 years)
3		S. P. Varma	October 1964	January 1968	
4		M. M. L. Hooja	January 1968	November 1971	Served during the 1968 creation of R&AW
5		Atma Jayaram	November 1971	August 1975	
6		S. N. Mathur	August 1975	February 1980	
7		T. V. Rajeswar	February 1980	August 1983	
8		R. K. Kapoor	August 1983	November 1984	
9		Hari Anand Barari	November 1984	March 1987	
10		M. K. Narayanan	April 1987	December 1989	First of two non-consecutive terms; later served as National Security Advisor
11		R. P. Joshi	December 1989	December 1990	
(10)		M. K. Narayanan	January 1991	February 1992	Second term
12		V. G. Vaidya	March 1992	July 1994	
13		D. C. Pathak	August 1994	August 1996	
14		Abhijit Mitra	August 1996	September 1996	Brief tenure of roughly one month
15		Arun Bhagat	September 1996	April 1998	
16		Shyamal Datta	April 1998	May 2001	
17		K. P. Singh	May 2001	July 2004	
18		Ajit Doval	July 2004	January 2005	Later appointed National Security Advisor (2014–present)
19		E. S. L. Narasimhan	February 2005	December 2006	Later served as Governor of Andhra Pradesh and Telangana
20		P. C. Haldar	January 2007	December 2008	
21		Rajiv Mathur	January 2009	December 2010	
22		Nehchal Sandhu	2010	2012	
23		Syed Asif Ibrahim	1 January 2013	31 December 2014	
24		Dineshwar Sharma	1 January 2015	31 December 2016	Later served as Administrator of Lakshadweep
25		Rajiv Jain	1 January 2017	26 June 2019	
26		Arvind Kumar	26 June 2019	30 June 2022	Granted service extensions beyond standard retirement age
27		Tapan Deka	1 July 2022	30 June 2026	1988-batch IPS officer (Himachal Pradesh cadre); granted extensions through June 2026
28		Mahesh Dixit	1 July 2026	Incumbent	1993-batch IPS officer (Andhra Pradesh cadre)

== See also ==
- Home Secretary (India)
- Secretary of the Research and Analysis Wing
- Director of the Special Protection Group
- Director General of the National Investigation Agency
