= Abdul Ghani Azhari =

Indian Muslim scholar (1922–2023)

Mufti Abdul Ghani Azhari

Personal life
- Born: 1922 Poonch, Jammu and Kashmir, British India
- Died: 19 January 2023 (aged 100–101) Saharanpur, Uttar Pradesh, India
- Education: Darul Uloom Deoband; Mazahir Uloom; Al-Azhar University

Religious life
- Religion: Islam
- Denomination: Sunni
- Founder of: Dar al-‘Ulum Nizamiyya Madinatul Islam
- Movement: Deobandi

Abdul Ghani Azhari (1922 – 19 January 2023), also known as Abdul Ghani Shah al-Shashi, was an Indian Muslim scholar and historian who served as the head-professor of the University of Kashmir's Arabic department. He was an alumnus of Darul Uloom Deoband, Mazahir Uloom and the Al-Azhar University. He authored Qadim Tarikh-e-Gujjar, a book detailing the history of Gujjars.

== Early life and education ==
Abdul Ghani Azhari was born in 1922 to a Kashmiri Sunni family of Muslim Gujjars in Poonch, Jammu and Kashmir. He received his education at Darul Uloom Deoband, Mazahir Uloom and the Al-Azhar University. He wrote his doctoral thesis on Al-Muslim entitled, Al Imam Al Muslim Wa Manhajuhu Fi Al Hadith Riwayatn wa Dirayatan. He studied with Hussain Ahmad Madani, Ibrahim Balyawi, Izaz Ali Amrohi, Muhammad Tayyib Qasmi, and Syed Fakhruddin Ahmad, and his teachers at Mazahir Uloom included Zakariyya Kandhlawi. At the Azhar, he studied with scholars including Abdel-Halim Mahmoud.

== Career ==
Azhari established Dar al-‘Ulum Nizamiyya Madinatul Islam in Badshahibagh (nearby Saharanpur), to cater to the needs of the Gurjar children. He also established religious seminaries in Kashmir, including Maktabah Anwar al Uloom, in Kokernag, and Darul Uloom Kawthariya near Dachigam National Park. In 2003, he established Darul Uloom Shah Wali Allah in Donipawa, Brakpora, in Anantnag. At the invitation of Shaikh Abdullah, Azhari served as a professor of Arabic at Madinatul Uloom in Hazratbal, Srinagar prior to joining the University of Kashmir.

Azhari was seen as a senior religious scholar in Kashmir. He served as the head-professor in the Arabic department of the University of Kashmir. He showed particular interest in the Qadiri order of Sufism and published works on the Naqshbandiyyah. He died on 19 January 2023 in Saharanpur. Salahuddin Tak, the current head-professor of the Arabic department at the University, described Azhari as "an eminent teacher, a great academician and an epitome of knowledge with high proficiency in religious science".

== Literary works ==
Azhari's works include:

- Gujjar Tareekh te Saqafat, compiled by Javaid Rahi
- Noor-i-Irfan
- Ma La Budda Minh, a book that he translated from Persian into Urdu
- Maktubat-i-Naqshbandiyyah
- Qadim Tarikh-i-Gujjar, a detailed book on the ancient history of Gujjars in India

== See also ==
- List of Deobandis
