= Rajiv Jain =

Former Director of the Intelligence Bureau of India

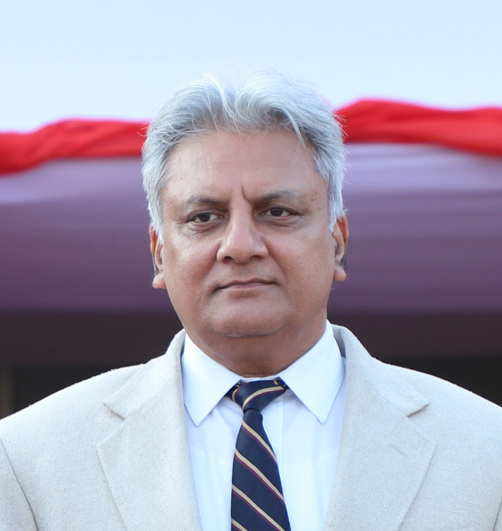

Former Director of Intelligence Bureau
- In office 1 January 2017 – 26 June 2019
- Prime Minister: Narendra Modi
- Preceded by: Dineshwar Sharma
- Succeeded by: Arvind Kumar

Personal details
- Born: 17 March 1957 (age 69)
- Education: Hindu College, Delhi; Delhi University
Occupation
IPS
Rajiv Jain
- Police career
- Rank: Director of Intelligence Bureau

Rajiv Jain (born 17 March 1957) is a retired Indian Police Service officer who formerly served as the Director of the Intelligence Bureau of India. He belonged to 1980 batch of the Indian Police Service. He is from the Jharkhand cadre and was appointed on 1 January 2017 as the 26th Director of Intelligence Bureau after the retirement of Dineshwar Sharma and served there till 26 June 2019. Post, retirement he was appointed as a member of the National Human Rights Commission of India where he served from 1 June 2021 till 1 June 2024.

== Biography ==
Rajiv Jain is the recipient of President’s Police Medal and has served in various departments of the Intelligence Bureau, including the sensitive Kashmir desk. He was the advisor to the previous NDA government’s interlocutor on Kashmir, KC Pant, when talks were held with separatist leaders like Shabbir Shah.

== See also ==
- Intelligence Bureau
- Director of the Intelligence Bureau
- Indian Police Service

Preceded by Dineshwar Sharma	Director of the Intelligence Bureau (January 1, 2017–	Succeeded by Arvind Kumar
