= Arvind Kumar (police officer) =

27th Director of the Intelligence Bureau, India

27th Director of Intelligence Bureau (DIB) Arvinda Kumar IPS

Intelligence Bureau
- In office 30 June 2019 – 30 June 2022
- Prime Minister: Narendra Modi
- Preceded by: Rajiv Jain
- Succeeded by: Tapan Deka

Vigilance Commissioner of the Central Vigilance Commission(CVC)
- In office 3 August 2022 – 30 September 2024
- Preceded by: Sharad Kumar (bureaucrat)
- Succeeded by: Praveen Vashista

Personal details
- Born: 30 September 1959 (age 67) Bihar
- Occupation: IPS

Arvind Kumar (born 30 September 1959) is a retired 1984 (37RR) batch Assam-Meghalaya cadre Indian Police Service (IPS) officer, and is a former Director of the Intelligence Bureau. the senior-most ranked IPS officer. After retirement, he was appointed as a Vigilance Commissioner of the Central Vigilance Commission (CVC) on 3 August 2022 and served there till 30 September 2024.

Kumar joined the Intelligence Bureau in 1991. On June 26, 2019, he was appointed the 27th director of the bureau, succeeding Rajiv Jain. He is a recipient of the President's Police Medal for Distinguished Service and consistent performance.

Preceded by Rajiv Jain	Director of the Intelligence Bureau (30 June 2019 to 30 June 2022)	Succeeded by Tapan Deka
