= P. C. Haldar =

20th Director of the Intelligence Bureau, India

20th Director of Intelligence Bureau (DIB) Pradyot Chandra Haldar IPS

20th Director of the Intelligence Bureau
- In office January 2007 – December 2008
- Preceded by: E. S. L. Narasimhan
- Succeeded by: Rajiv Mathur

Personal details
- Born: 21 January 1947 (age 79)

Military service
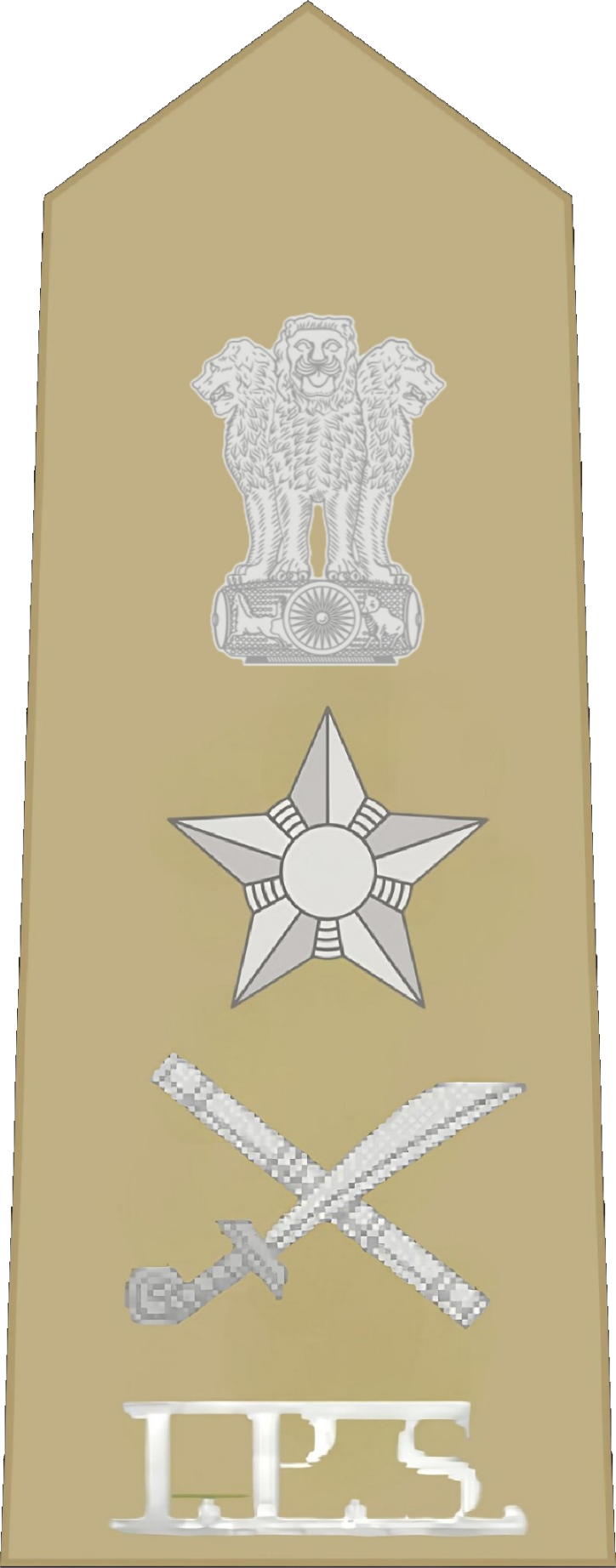
- Rank: Director of the Intelligence Bureau

Pradyot Chandra Haldar (best known as P. C. Haldar) is a retired IPS officer who served as 20th Director of Intelligence Bureau of India.

== Police career ==
Haldar is a 1970 batch IPS officer of the Bihar cadre.

In 1990s, Haldar played a key role as negotiator between Government of India and North Eastern insurgents.

Haldar, on 24 September 2008, informed the then DGP of Maharashtra about LeT's planning of attack in several places of the state priors to Mumbai attacks, November 2008.

Haldar was also the interlocutor between the Government of India and militant outfits including ULFA and NDFB till 2015.

Halder also served in British High Commission.
