= Hilal Akbar Lone =

Indian politician

Member of Jammu and Kashmir Legislative Assembly
- Incumbent
- Assumed office 8 October 2024
- Preceded by: Mohammad Akbar Lone
- Constituency: Sonawari

Personal details
- Party: Jammu & Kashmir National Conference
- Profession: Politician

Hilal Akbar Lone (Sher-e-Sonawari) is an Indian politician from Jammu & Kashmir. He is a Member of the Jammu & Kashmir Legislative Assembly from 2024, representing Sonawari Assembly constituency as a Member of the Jammu & Kashmir National Conference party. He is the son of the former Member of Parliament Mohammad Akbar Lone who served from Baramulla constituency. He won with a margin of 13 thousand votes.

== See also ==
- 2024 Jammu & Kashmir Legislative Assembly election
- Jammu and Kashmir Legislative Assembly
