= Ikhwan (disambiguation) =

Ikhwan is Islamic militia which played an important role in Saudi Arabia's history.

Ikhwan (Arabic: إخوان) is an Arabic word meaning "brothers". It may refer to:

- Global Ikhwan, a group of companies associated with the Malaysian Al-Arqam sect
- Ikhwan (Kashmir), pro-Indian government militia in Kashmir
- Muslim Brotherhood (Al-Ikhwān al-Muslimūn), political opposition movement in many Arab states
- Ikhwan Antasari (born 1984), an Indonesian politician and Deputy Regent of Paser (2025-2030)
- Yihewani, Islamic sect in China (the name is a Chinese transcription of "Ikhwan")
- Ikhwan as-Safa wa-Khullan al-Wafa, a secret society of Islamic polymaths in 8th or 10th century CE, Basra, Iraq.

Ikhwan (Korean: 익환), sometimes spelled Ikwhan, is also a Korean given name:

- Ik-Hwan Bae (1956–2014), South Korean violinist
- Moon Ik-hwan (1918–1994), South Korean pastor
