= Tapan Deka =

Director of Intelligence Bureau, India

28th Director of the Intelligence Bureau
- In office 1 July 2022 – 30 June 2026
- Prime Minister: Narendra Modi
- Preceded by: Arvind Kumar
- Succeeded by: Mahesh Dixit

Personal details
- Born: 25 February 1963 (age 63) Sarthebari, Barpeta district, Assam

Military service
- Years of service: 1988 – 2026
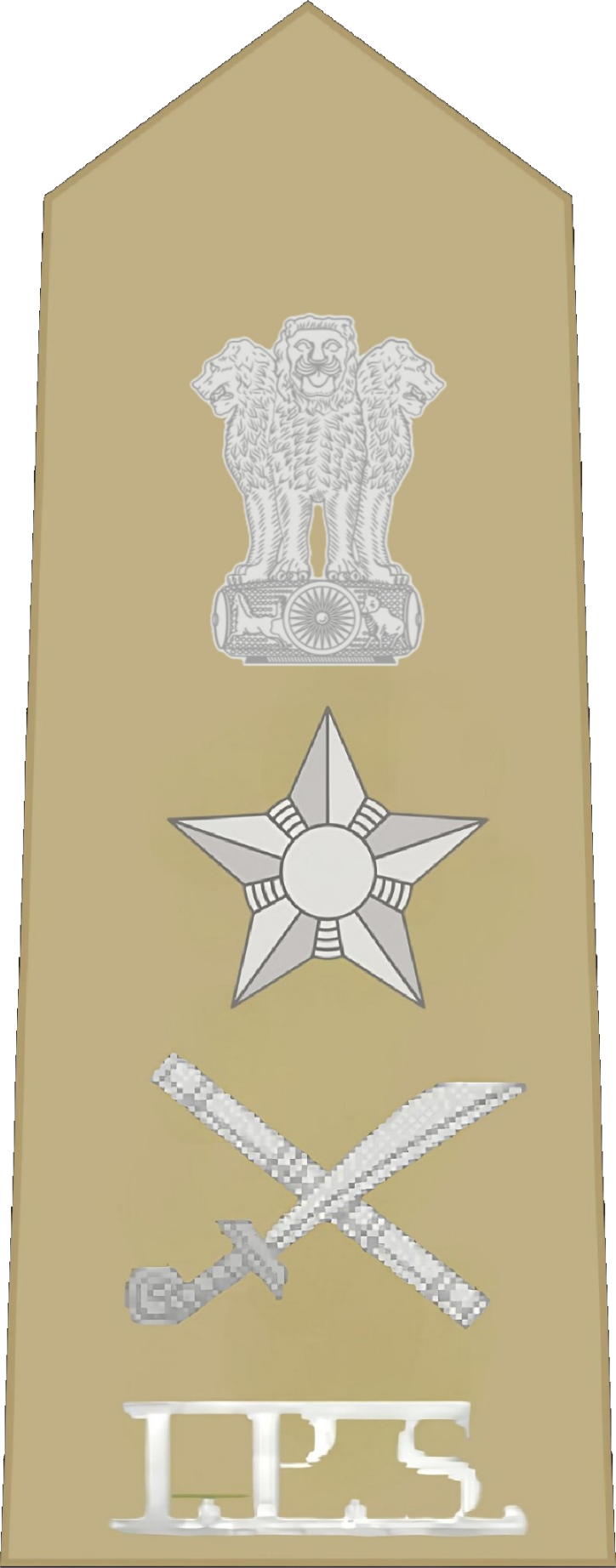
- Rank: Director of the Intelligence Bureau

Tapan Kumar Deka (born 25 February 1963) is an Indian bureaucrat and Indian Police Service (IPS) officer who served as the 28th Director of the Intelligence Bureau (IB). A 1988-batch IPS officer of the Himachal Pradesh cadre, he was empanelled to the rank of Director General of Police in 2021. He assumed office as Director of the Intelligence Bureau on 1 July 2022, succeeding Arvind Kumar, whose tenure ended on 30 June 2022.

During his police career, Tapan Deka spent most of his service with the Intelligence Bureau (IB), which he joined in 1988. He has worked closely with National Security Adviser Ajit Doval on several counterterrorism and national security assignments. As Director of the Intelligence Bureau, his tenure was extended by the Appointments Committee of the Cabinet until June 2025. In May 2025, the committee approved a further one-year extension, allowing him to continue in office until June 2026. With this extension, Deka became the longest-serving Director of the Intelligence Bureau.

== Early life and education ==
Deka was born on 25 February 1963 in Sarthebari, Assam, into an Assamese people family. He earned a master's degree in physics from the University of Delhi. During his student years, he was associated with the All Assam Students' Union (AASU). He joined the Indian Police Service (IPS) after clearing the Civil Services Examination on his first attempt.

== Career ==
Tapan Deka was appointed as the counter-terrorism operations chief in Kashmir. Tapan Deka has formally served as Deputy Director, Joint Director, and Additional Director, Special Director at Intelligence Bureau. He served as the head of the operations wing of the IB for over two decades.

Deka is widely known as Crisis man.

Deka was also in charge of the counter-assaults during 2008 Mumbai attacks.

During Citizenship Amendment Act protests in Assam, Tapan Deka was deputed as per the advice of Home Minister of India Amit Shah.

He was also the head of investigation of the 2008 Assam bombings case. He also handled the investigation of Pathankot air base attack and Pulwama attack, and was the brain behind the arrest of Yasin Bhatkal, founder of Indian Mujahideen, from Nepal. Deka is believed to be the key official of the surgical strike in Balakot, Pakistan. Hindustan Times reported that "Deka is an Afghanistan-Pakistan expert, who has over two decades of experience in tracking Jehadi and Islamic extremism while working in the premier intelligence agency."

Preceded by Arvind Kumar	Director of the Intelligence Bureau (1 July 2022) – (30 June 2026)	Succeeded by Mahesh Dixit

== Awards ==
- President's Police Medal for distinguished service in 2012.
