= Chattisinghpora, Pathribal, and Barakpora massacres =

2000 incidents in India

The Chattisinghpora, Pathribal, and Barakpora massacres refer to a series of three closely related incidents that took place in the Anantnag district of Jammu and Kashmir between 20 March 2000 and 3 April 2000 that left up to 49 Kashmiri civilians dead.

== The Chattisinghpora massacre ==
Wearing Indian Army fatigues and their faces masked, the terrorists arrived into the village in military vehicles in two groups at opposite ends of the village where the two gurdwaras were located. The terrorists marched from home to home, introducing themselves as Indian Army personnel, with some dabbing their faces in Holi colours and one conspicuously drinking from a bottle of rum, and ordered every male member of the household come out for security checks. They ordered them to line up in front of the gurdwaras and opened fire, killing thirty-five Sikhs.

=== Aftermath ===
The massacre was a turning point in the Kashmir issue, where Sikhs had usually been spared from militant violence.

Shortly after the massacre, hundreds of Kashmiri Sikhs gathered in Jammu, shouting anti Pakistan and anti Muslim slogans, criticising the Indian government for failing to protect the villagers, and demanding retaliation.

=== Perpetrators ===
As per Anantnag District Police, residents of Chittisinghpura identified Mohammad Yakub Magray as one of the perpetrators. Although Magray was questioned and held several times under Jammu and Kashmir's controversial Public Safety Act, he was never charged or prosecuted for the Chittisinghpora killings.

Two Pakistani nationals, Mohammad Suhail Malik of Sialkot and Wasim Ahmad of Gujranwala, were arrested by the Special Operations Group of Jammu and Kashmir police and charged with having participated in the killings at Chittisinghpura. Malik was alleged to have infiltrated across the Line of Control (LoC) in 1999 and participated in two attacks on the army.

In 2000, Indian authorities announced that Malik, a nephew of Lashkar-e-Taiba co-founder Hafiz Muhammad Saeed, confessed while in Indian custody to participating in the attacks at the direction of Lashkar-e-Taiba. He repeated the claim in an interview with Barry Bearak of The New York Times while still in Indian custody. Later, the American journalist Barry Bearak was able to confirm many of the details Malik had offered to journalists. His father Anwar Malik admitted Malik had gone to wage jihad in Kashmir, Bearak reported. In 2011, a Delhi court cleared Malik of the charges.

In an introduction to a book written by Madeleine Albright titled The Mighty and the Almighty: Reflections on America, God, and World Affairs (2006), Hillary Clinton accused "Hindu militants" of perpetrating the act, which evoked outrage of Hindu and Sikh groups. Clinton's office did not return calls seeking comment or clarification. Ultimately the publishers, HarperCollins, edited the statement out of future editions of the book. They acknowledged the error in an email to the Times of India:

Page xi of the Mighty and the Almighty contains a reference to Hindu militants that will be deleted in subsequent printings, both in America and in international editions. This error was due to a failure in the fact-checking process.

In 2010, the Lashkar-e-Taiba associate David Headley, who was arrested in connection with the 2008 Mumbai attacks, reportedly told the National Investigation Agency that the LeT carried out the Chittisinghpura massacre. He is said to have identified an LeT militant named Muzzamil Bhat as part of the group which carried out the killings apparently to create communal tension just before Clinton's visit. Two of the terrorists held on charges of being responsible for the massacre were escorted across the border into Pakistan in 2015 after being acquitted of all charges by a Delhi court. Muzzamil, the Lashkar jihadist believed to have led the killing team, went on to train the men who carried out the 26/11 carnage in Mumbai, according to the testimony of David Headley.

In 2005, Sikh organizations headed by the Bhai Kanahiya Jee Nishkam Seva Society demanded a deeper state inquiry into the details of the massacre and for the inquiry to be made public. The state government ordered an inquiry into the massacre.

== The Pathribal killings ==
Five days after the events at Chattisinghpora, on 25 March 2000, Col. Ajay Saxena, Commanding Officer 7 RR (Retired Brigadier Now), Lt. Col. Brajendra Pratap Singh 2IC 7 RR (Retired Col Now), Lt. Saurabh Sharma of Military Intelligence 7RR (Retired Major Now), Lt. Amit Saxena Adjutant 7 RR (later Major) and Nb. Sub. Idrees Khan (later Subedar) of the Indian Army killed five men in Pathribal village of Anantnag district, claiming that the victims were the "foreign militants" responsible for the attacks. Official reports claimed that security forces had, after a gun fight, blown up the hut where the men were hiding, and had retrieved five bodies that had been charred beyond recognition. The bodies were buried separately without any postmortem examination.

Local observers and political activists doubted the Indian government's official reports however, pointing out that if there had been a gunfight, some of the security force personnel must have sustained significant injuries – but none were injured, except Major Saurabh Sharma, who suffered minor injury while abducting one of the civilian from the village. Over the following days, local villagers began to protest, claiming that the men were ordinary civilians who had been killed in a fake encounter, not "foreign militants." According to them, up to 17 men had been detained by the police and "disappeared" between 21 and 24 March. On 30 March, local authorities in Anantnag relented to growing public pressure, and agreed to exhume the bodies and conduct an investigation into the deaths.

On 19 March 2012, The CBI (central Bureau of Investigation) told the Supreme Court of India that the fake encounter at Pathribal in Jammu and Kashmir 12 years ago in which seven people were killed by Army personnel "were cold-blooded murders and the accused officials deserve to be meted out exemplary punishment." Senior counsel Ashok Bhan told a special bench of justices, B S Chauhan and Swatanter Kumar, that no prior sanction was required for prosecuting the Army officials and the need to ensure "public confidence in the rule of law and dispensation of justice" warranted their prosecution. "Our investigations have revealed it was a fake encounter and cold-blooded" In June 2012, the Army conveyed its readiness to a Srinagar court to try the accused personnel in the military court. On 23 January 2014, the Indian Army closed this Case as evidence collected by it did not establish a prima facie case against any of the accused.

== The Barakpora killings ==
=== The Encounter claim by State Police ===
Days later, Inspector General of Police (Kashmir range) Dr A K Bhan claimed that his personnel led by Senior Superintendent of Police Farooq Khan, in a joint operation with the army, had shot dead the five militants responsible for the Sikh massacre. According to Dr Bhan, the government forces had surrounded a hut in Panchthalan, near Pathribal, where the terrorists were hiding. The fierce encounter that ensued ended when the shelter, with all five inside, caught fire and was destroyed.

=== Investigation ===
The special investigation team inquiring into the Pathribal incident approached the Centre for DNA Fingerprinting and Diagnostics, Hyderabad, and the Central Forensic Science Laboratory, Kolkata, with medical samples of the relatives to match with those of the slain men. That was in 2000. Two years later, the controversy had faded from public memory when The Times of India reported that the samples from the relatives had been substituted with some others, a fact that both forensic centres had conveyed to the state police more than a year ago. '...While the DNA samples purported to have been collected from the relatives did not match those of the DNA isolated from the exhumed bodies, in three cases, the samples of women relatives were found to have come from men,' read the Times report.

=== Victims struggle for Justice ===
In their little village in the militancy-hit Anantnag district, the traumatised family of Zahoor Dalal waits for justice – if not from Dr Abdullah, then from the Almighty."I do not need DNA tests to recognise my son," Dalaal's mother Raja Bano told rediff.com "We had identified his body two years ago. Since the government wanted proof, we had given them blood samples. Now we are told those have been tampered with." Since her son's death, she has been unwell, subject to alternating fits of weeping and hysteria. The trauma has taken its toll on her daughter, Zahoor's younger sister, as well—she talks little, eats less, and faints frequently. "Those who killed my son will not get away," Raja Bano said. "The government may help them, but Allah will not deny me justice." Her lack of faith in Dr Abdullah's government is founded on two facts. One, the state administration, despite knowing for a year that the samples had been fudged, did not make any effort to conduct a fresh test. It collected fresh samples from the relatives only after the controversy hit the front pages and forced an admission from Dr Abdullah in the state assembly that the earlier samples had been fudged. And two, even after the Times report, senior state government officials continued to maintain that they had not received any communication from the forensic centres. Dr Syed E Hasnain, director of the Centre for DNA Fingerprinting and Diagnostics, contradicted the latter claim. "Certainly the report has been sent to the investigating officer [appointed by the Jammu and Kashmir judiciary]," Dr Hasnain confirmed to rediff.com "I cannot comment on the fudging... but we stand by what we have said in the report." Central Forensic Science Laboratory Director V K Kashyap told the Times: 'We had dashed off a letter to the J&K government immediately after we found the samples had certain serious discrepancies. Till date we have not received a single reply from either the state authorities or the investigative agency... We finished our investigations way back in December 2000, but how can we submit a report that is meaningless?' 'The samples,' he added, 'were obviously tampered with.' After the Times report was published, the state government admitted that the centres had written to it, and promised that it would undertake fresh tests. Meanwhile, the cover-up attempt has strengthened the Kashmiris' belief that the five men were not terrorists—a belief that some leaders of the local Sikh community also share.

=== Response by Kashmiri Sikh Community ===
"The five the government killed were innocent," Niranjan Singh, president of the Anantnag District Gurdwara Parbandhak Committee, told rediff.com on the telephone. "They had nothing to do with the murders." Ranjit Singh, former president of the Anantnag Gurdwara Parbandhak Committee, seconded this opinion. "Nobody believes the claims," he said in a telephone interview. "It is utter nonsense."

=== Another inquiry ===
Dr. Abdullah, after an initial attempt to sidestep the controversy, responded with another inquiry. The chief minister told the state assembly that he was deeply 'ashamed there are agencies that can behave in such a manner.' He apologised to the assembly and promised that all those involved in collecting and sending 'fake' samples would be immediately suspended. And if found guilty by the one-member commission of inquiry he had just appointed, they would be 'dismissed and prosecuted', a Times report quoted him as saying. Blood samples were once again collected from relatives of the five youth and sent to Kolkata and Hyderabad. Jammu & Kashmir Chief Secretary Ashok Jaitley clarified the matter further. "We were naturally taken aback when we read that the samples had been fudged," he told rediff.com in a telephone interview. "The state government will get to the bottom of this issue, that is why we have appointed Justice G A Kuchay, former judge of the Jammu & Kashmir high court, to inquire." Jaitley said any action against those involved would follow only after the commission submits its report, which would be within two months. Kashmiris react with cynicism. This, they point out, is how the script read even earlier—suspension, court of inquiry, tests... What compounds their cynicism is the fact that even as the state government sat on the communications from Hyderabad and Kolkata, it reinstated SSP Farooq Khan.

=== Response of opposition Parties ===
Dr Abdullah's political opponents condemned the incident. Such actions, they said, erode the people's trust in justice and fair play. "It clearly shows the designs of the Farooq government," said former Union home minister Mufti Mohammad Sayeed, People's Democratic Party leader and main rival of Dr Abdullah's National Conference. "It wants to cover up the killing of those five innocents." True, agreed Mehbooba Mufti, Sayeed's daughter and PDP leader. "The Pathribal killing," she said, "is just one in a huge spate of grave human rights violations since the National Conference government was elected." Another example she cites was the killing of 19 civilians, including a pregnant woman, in Poonch in 1997. "The state Human Rights Commission presented its report," she said. "But the government has taken no action till now against the surrendered militants and security force personnel involved." "What happens after an inquiry? Do they act on the recommendations?" she asked. "No, they don't," she said, answering her own question. "They just let it be." Dr Abdullah's position on human rights, his critics allege, is visible in the incident that started it all—namely, the Chattisinghpora massacre. "In any case," said Communist Party of India-Marxist legislator Yusuf Tarigami, "the basis of the protest at Barakpora was the killing of the five men at Pathribal. But the government kept that out of the Pandian Commission's purview, showing how bent it was on hiding the truth." "Now Farooq Abdullah is talking of another inquiry, fresh samples," he continued. "But that will not achieve anything... People have lost trust in these inquiry commissions."

=== Allegations and counter-allegations ===
There were allegations and counter-allegations—India said the massacre was the handiwork of Pakistan-sponsored terrorists; Pakistan-based terrorists alleged that Indian security forces were responsible. But there was no independent inquiry into the matter. The chief minister asked Justice S R Pandian of the Supreme Court, who had inquired into the Barakpora firing and found the security force personnel guilty, to study the Sikh killings, but the judge refused to do so. "Since he [Farooq Abdullah] was not interested in arriving at the truth, he let it be after that cosmetic exercise," his critics point out.

=== Victim Family continued Trauma ===
Nothing expresses it better than Raja Bano's words: "I will give more blood, a thousand times if needed. But I don't think I will get justice from the government. Because they are the judges, they are the investigators, and they are the guilty." With no action being taken with regards to the promised investigation into the Pathribal deaths, the local population grew increasingly restless. On 3 April 2000, an estimated 3,000 to 4,000 protesters marched to the city of Anantnag, where they intended to present a memorandum to the Deputy Commissioner demanding the exhumation of the bodies. When they reached the town of Barakpora, three kilometres from Anantnag, the protesters began an unprovoked throwing of stones at an Indian paramilitary camp. Members of the Central Reserve Police Force responded by opening fire on the protesters, killing 7 and injuring at least 15 more, of whom 1 or 2 later died of their injuries.

== Pathribal DNA cover-up ==
On 5 April 2000, Chief Minister Farooq Abdullah ordered the exhumation of the bodies from the Pathribal killings, which began the next day. DNA samples were collected from the five bodies, as well as 15 relatives of the missing young men, and were submitted to forensic laboratories in Kolkata and Hyderabad. However, in March 2002 it was discovered that the DNA samples allegedly taken from the bodies of the Pathribal victims (all of whom were men) had been tampered with, when, according to a report from the Times of India, lab workers found that samples had in fact been collected from females. Fresh samples were collected in April 2002, which, upon testing, conclusively proved that the victims were innocent local civilians, and not foreign militants as the Indian government had been claiming for the past two years.

== Aftermath ==
In August 2000, the Indian government announced that it had captured two Pakistan-based Lashkar e Tayyiba operatives, who, in December 2000, allegedly admitted to carrying out the attacks. An alleged Lashkar militant, Mohammad Suhail Malik of Sialkot, Pakistan, admitted to participating in the massacre. In an interview with The New York Times, he stated that he had been trained in mountain climbing and marksmanship by the Lashkar, and had infiltrated into India in October 1999 carrying the equivalent of $200 for expenses. Malik went on to say that he knew nothing about the plot to kill the Sikhs until he stood in an orchard where the 35 people were killed, and had opened fire because he had been ordered to do so by his commanders. He stated that while "the Koran teaches us not to kill innocents...if Lashkar told us to kill those people, then it was right to do it. I have no regrets." However, in the same article, the author decried the conditions under which the interview was conducted, and expressed doubt about the veracity of the confession. He stated that Malik gave few details in his answers, primarily repeating information from official police dossiers, and expressed concern that Malik may have been tortured while in custody. At one point in the article he states:

"I wanted to interview the teenager once more, this time without the authorities present. Somehow, I thought I could win his trust, offer him an out, persuade him that he did not have to confess to the massacre unless it was true.

On 10 August 2011, a Delhi court acquitted both Malik and another Pakistani national, Waseem Ahmed, of the charge of involvement in the Chattisinghpora massacre.

Some human rights organisations have also expressed doubt about the veracity of these admissions. Independent inquiries by human rights activists from Punjab and the Ludhiana-based International Human Rights Organization have found that it is unlikely that the attacks were carried out by Indian security forces themselves, and that the perpetrators were most likely renegades.

In 2005, Sikh organisations such as the Bhai Kanahiya Jee Nishkam Seva Society demanded a deeper state inquiry into the details of the massacre and for the inquiry to be made public. In the wake of arrest of an Army officer for Malegaon blasts, Sikhs of J&K have demanded into the Chattisinghpora massacre.

== Chattisinghpora massacre in film ==
The massacre was depicted in the commercial Bollywood film Adharm (unholy) directed by Adeep Singh.

== See also ==
- Sopore massacre
- Gawakadal massacre
- Bijbehara Massacre
- Zakoora And Tengpora Massacre, 1990
- Kashmir conflict
