= Syed Asif Ibrahim =

Indian intelligence officer

Director of Intelligence Bureau
- In office 1 January 2013 – 31 December 2014
- Prime Minister: Manmohan Singh; Narendra Modi
- Preceded by: Nehchal Sandhu
- Succeeded by: Dineshwar Sharma

Personal details
- Born: 28 September 1953 (age 72) Madhya Pradesh, India
- Occupation: Intelligence officer / Civil Servant

Syed Asif Ibrahim (born 28 September 1953) is an Indian diplomat and a former director of the Intelligence Bureau, the main internal intelligence agency of India. He held the position of director from 1 January 2013 to 31 December 2014. He was the first Muslim in India to hold this important position. He is an Indian Police Service (IPS) officer of Madhya Pradesh cadre and belongs to its 1977 batch.

In June 2015, he was appointed as Indian Prime Minister's special envoy on "Countering Terrorism and Extremism" with a charter to liaise with governments of West Asian countries, and Afghanistan and Pakistan.

== See also ==
- Syed Akbaruddin

Preceded by N. Sandhu	Director of the Intelligence Bureau (1 January 2013–31 December 2014	Succeeded by Dineshwar Sharma
