= Dineshwar Sharma =

Indian police officer (1954–2020)

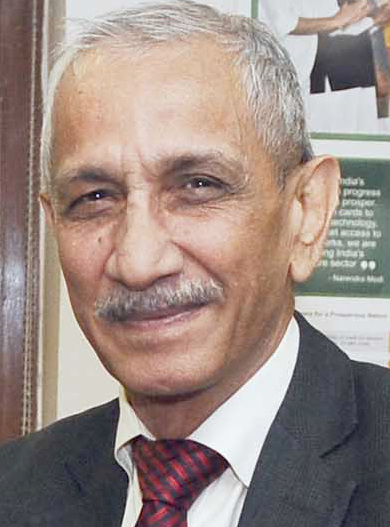
- Sharma in January 2018

Administrator of Lakshadweep
- In office 3 November 2019 – 4 December 2020^{[†]}
- Appointed by: Ram Nath Kovind
- Preceded by: Mihir Vardhan
- Succeeded by: Praful Khoda Patel (additional charge)

Director of Intelligence Bureau
- In office 1 January 2015 – 1 January 2017
- Prime Minister: Narendra Modi
- Preceded by: Syed Asif Ibrahim
- Succeeded by: Rajiv Jain

Personal details
- Born: 23 March 1954 Bihar, India
- Died: 4 December 2020 (aged 66)
- Occupation: Civil Servant

Dineshwar Sharma (23 March 1954 – 4 December 2020) was a former IFS and IPS officer.

He was the chief of the Indian Intelligence Bureau (succeeded by Rajiv Jain), that is the Director of Intelligence Bureau which is the highest-ranked post in the Indian Police Service (IPS).

He also served as an interlocutor to the government of India for the state of Jammu and Kashmir. He served as the 34th Administrator of Lakshadweep from 2019 until his death.

== Background ==
Born in Bihar, he belonged to Khaneta Pali village in the Belaganj thana of Gaya District. He gained primary education in Pali, Bihar, and later graduated from Magadh University, Bodh Gaya. A third-generation policeman, Sharma first qualified for Indian Forest Service (IFS) and later for IPS.

== Career ==
He worked continuously in the IB after 2008. He attended training on intelligence work and policing methods in East Germany, Poland, Israel and South Korea. He served in Nagaland, Jammu and Kashmir, Gujarat and Rajasthan in various capacities in BSF, CRPF and IB. He also worked with National Security Adviser (NSA) Ajit Doval during his earlier stint as IB chief. He was fluent in Hindi, English, Maithili, Malayalam, Tamil, Arabic, and Urdu.

Government offices
Preceded by Syed Asif Ibrahim	Director of the Intelligence Bureau; 1 January 2015 – 31 December 2016	Succeeded by Rajiv Jain
Political offices
Preceded by Mihir Vardhan	Administrator of Lakshadweep; 3 November 2019 – 4 December 2020	Succeeded by Praful Khoda Patel (additional charge)
