= E. S. L. Narasimhan =

Indian police officer and the 1st Governor of Telangana state

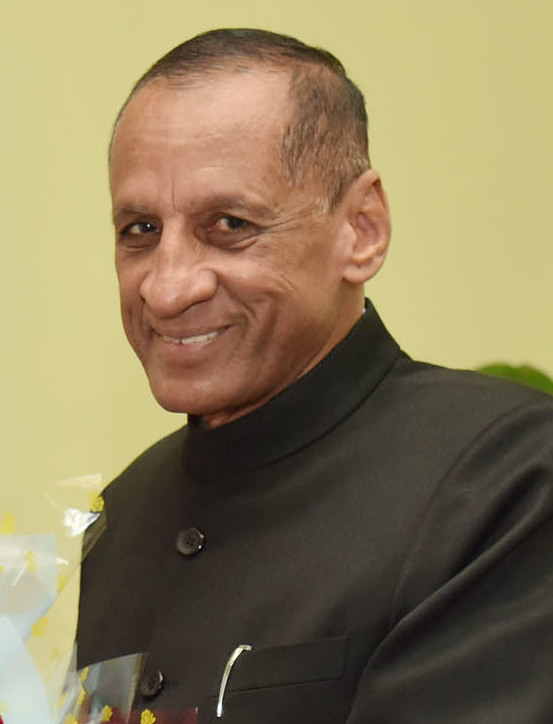
- Narasimhan in 2017

1st Governor of Telangana
- In office 24 July 2019 – 7 September 2019
- Chief Minister: K. Chandrasekhar Rao
- Preceded by: Himself (additional charge)
- Succeeded by: Tamilisai Soundararajan

Governor of Telangana
- (Additional Charge)
- In office 2 June 2014 – 23 July 2019
- Chief Minister: K. Chandrasekhar Rao
- Preceded by: Office Established
- Succeeded by: Himself

18th Governor of Andhra Pradesh
- In office 23 January 2010 – 23 July 2019
- Chief Minister: Konijeti Rosaiah; Kiran Kumar Reddy; N. Chandrababu Naidu; Y. S. Jagan Mohan Reddy
- Preceded by: Himself (additional charge)
- Succeeded by: Biswabhusan Harichandan

Governor of Andhra Pradesh
- (Additional Charge)
- In office 27 December 2009 – 22 January 2010
- Chief Minister: Konijeti Rosaiah
- Preceded by: N. D. Tiwari
- Succeeded by: Himself

3rd Governor of Chhattisgarh
- In office 25 January 2007 – 23 January 2010
- Chief Minister: Raman Singh
- Preceded by: Krishna Mohan Seth
- Succeeded by: Shekhar Dutt

Director of the Intelligence Bureau
- In office February 2005 – December 2006
- Prime Minister: Manmohan Singh
- Preceded by: Ajit Doval
- Succeeded by: P. C. Haldar

Personal details
- Born: 4 November 1945 (age 81) Madras Presidency, British India (now Tamil Nadu, India)
- Spouse: Vimala Narasimhan
- Education: Vivekananda College; Presidency College; Madras Law College

Ekkadu Srinivasan Lakshmi Narasimhan (born 4 November 1945) is an Indian former civil servant and politician who served as the first Governor of Telangana. He assumed office of the Governor of Andhra Pradesh on 8 December 2009 until 23 July 2019 making him the longest-serving governor of the state. Later he took on 2 June 2014 as the 1st Governor of Telangana as additional charge. A retired Indian Police Service officer, he previously served as the director of the Intelligence Bureau from February 2005 to December 2006. He also served as the Governor of Chhattisgarh from 2007 to 2009. Narasimhan served as governor for 12 years making him the longest-serving governor in India.

== Early life ==
Narasimhan was born in Tamil Nadu in 1945. After an initial two years schooling at Little Flower High School, Hyderabad, he completed his entire education from Chennai. Migrating from Physics at Ramakrishna Mission Vivekananda College, Chennai to Political science, Narasimhan was awarded the gold medal at the Madras Presidency College. He is also a graduate in law from the Madras Law College.

== Career ==
Narasimhan belongs to the 1968 batch of IPS from Andhra Pradesh cadre. He served as the First Secretary in the Embassy of India in Moscow from 1981 to 1984. He is highly respected police official.

He worked in the Intelligence Bureau for many years until retiring as the director of the bureau on 31 December 2006. He is also an alumnus of the National Defence College, New Delhi.

On 19 January 2007, Narasimhan was appointed Governor of Chhattisgarh, and took office on 25 January. On 27 December 2009, he took additional charge as acting Governor of Andhra Pradesh, from Narayan Dutt Tiwari, who resigned after a sex scandal. On 23 January 2010, he was formally appointed to the governorship of Andhra Pradesh, upon leaving office in Chhattisgarh.

With the process for formation of a separate Telangana state entering crucial phase, Andhra Pradesh governor Narasimhan held a series of meeting with central leaders in the national capital on 23 October 2013.

Summoned by the centre for consultations before the efforts to bifurcate Andhra Pradesh are intensified, Narasimhan held separate meetings with United Progressive Alliance (UPA) chairperson Sonia Gandhi, Union Home Minister Sushilkumar Shinde and Union Finance Minister P Chidambaram.

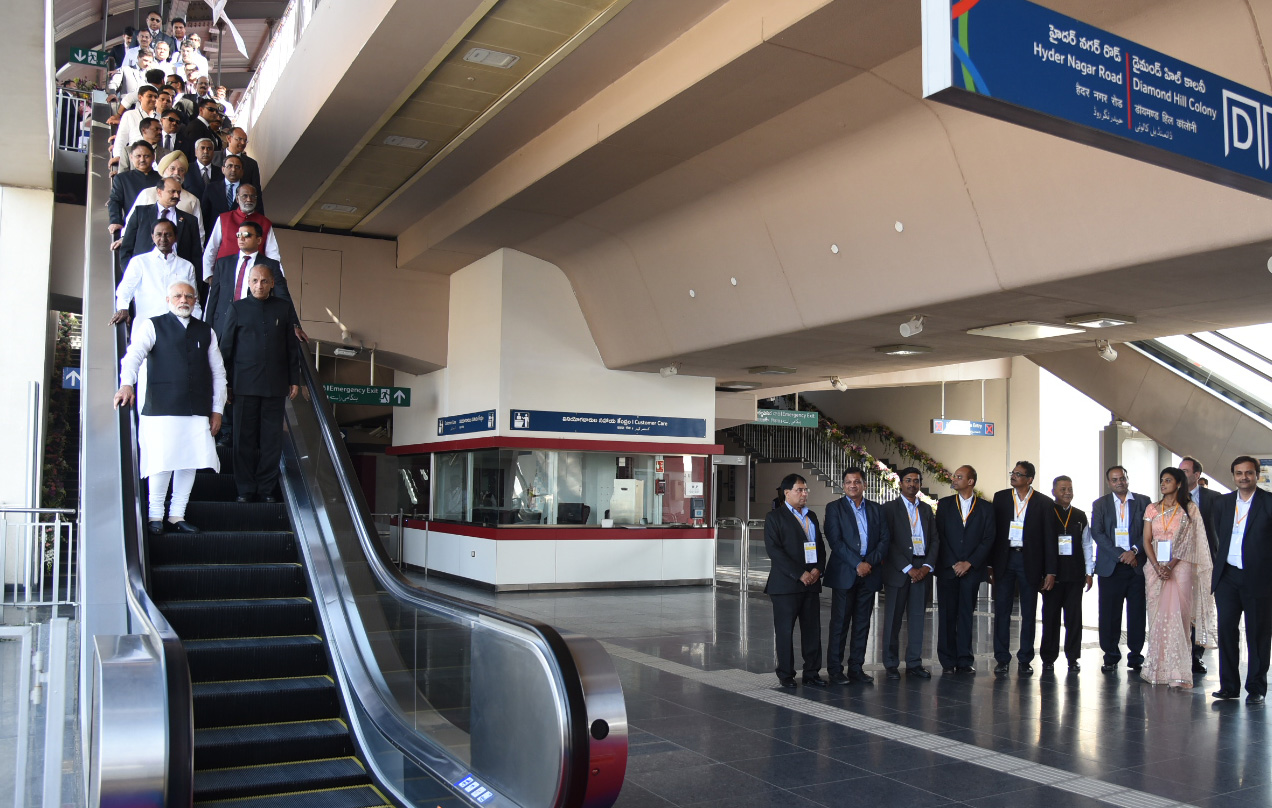
E. S. L. Narasimhan with Prime Minister Narendra Modi during Hyderabad metro inauguration in 2017

Narasimhan first met Chidambaram, who is a member of the Group of Ministers (GoM) constituted to work out modalities for formation of the Telangana state. During the meeting, which lasted for 30 minutes, the governor is believed to have discussed various issues that may arise post-bifurcation. The governor later called on the UPA chairperson and briefed her on the latest situation in the state in the wake of the decision to carve Telangana state. He is learnt to have presented a report on the bifurcation issue. The Telugu Desam Party has taken strong exception to Andhra Pradesh Governor ESL Narasimhan's meetings with Congress top leaders in New Delhi and questioned if it was part of his official duties.

Leader of opposition in Andhra Pradesh Legislative Council and Telugu Desam Party politburo member Yanamala Ramakrishnudu criticised the governor for meeting AICC general secretary Digvijay Singh in New Delhi in October 2013. "Why should the governor go to Digvijay's residence and brief him? Is it part of governor's official duties?", Yanamala questioned. He alleged the governor was "doing the rounds of Congress leaders' houses" carrying official files. "Is the governor going to decide the fate of 8.47 crore Telugu people?", Yanamala said.

During the controversial president rule from 1 May 2014 to 1 June 2014, he, as Governor of undivided Andhra Pradesh, issued many extra constitutional government orders without having taken approval from the Parliament under article 356(1) or sanction of parliament under article 357(1) of the constitution. He took oath of office as state governor to preserve, protect and defend the constitution and the law.

On 13 June 2017 Narasimhan became longest serving Governor of Andhra Pradesh by surpassing Krishan Kant.

Police appointments
Preceded by Ajit Doval	Director of the Intelligence Bureau; January 2005 - December 2006	Succeeded by P. C. Haldar
Government offices
Preceded by Krishna Mohan Seth	Governor of Chhattisgarh; 25 January 2007 – 23 January 2010	Succeeded by Shekhar Dutt
Preceded by N. D. Tiwari	Governor of Andhra Pradesh; 27 December 2009 – 23 July 2019	Succeeded by Biswabhusan Harichandan
Preceded by State Created	Governor of Telangana; 2 June 2014 - 7 September 2019	Succeeded by Tamilisai Soundararajan
