= 1998 Wandhama massacre =

Militant killing of Kashmiri Hindus

Coordinates: 34°14′55″N 74°44′00″E

Wandhama Massacre
- Location: Wandhama, Ganderbal, Jammu and Kashmir, India
- Date: 25 January 1998
- Target: Kashmiri Hindus
- Attack type: Mass murder
- Deaths: 23 (ten women, nine men, and four children)
- Perpetrators: Lashkar-e-Taiba; Hizbul Mujahideen
- Motive: Islamic Terrorism

Location of attack.

The 1998 Wandhama massacre was an Islamic terrorist attack which saw the massacre of 23 Kashmiri Hindus in their homes, in the town of Wandhama, in the Ganderbal District of Jammu and Kashmir, India on 25 January 1998. The massacre was carried out by the militant outfits Lashkar-e-Taiba and Hizbul Mujahideen. The victims included four children and nine women.

== The massacre ==
According to the testimony of a survivor, on the eve of Republic Day, 25 January 1998 around 8:30 pm, approximately 28 armed men came to their house disguised as soldiers of the Indian Army. After a brief conversation, they rounded up all the members of the Hindu households and then summarily gunned them down with Kalashnikov rifles.

The victims mainly belonged to four Kashmiri Pandit families who had remained in the village despite the early 1990s forced displacement of Kashmiri Hindus from the Kashmir Valley due to threats and violence of the militants in the region. Five victims were relatives who were visiting from Jammu, where a large number of displaced Kashmiri Hindus live as refugees. In all, 23 people were killed, including nine women and four children. The lone survivor from the four households was a 14-year-old boy, Vinod Kumar Dhar, who lost his parents, two sisters and two brothers in the massacre. Dhar remained hidden in attic, while the killings happened. As per his account, after the killings, the militants set all four houses and a nearby Hindu temple on fire, and left after midnight. As per a PTI news report, a one-year-old child victim sustained 18 bullet wounds. His mother tried to shield him in her lap, but both were killed, their bodies were later recover by police from the burnt houses, and could not be separated initially.

Initially 17 bodies were recovered, but subsequently six more bodies were discovered inside a burnt house, raising the death toll to 23. A 1999-independent report by Human Rights Watch confirmed that militants had massacred 23 Hindu villagers and a Hindu temple was also set on fire.

== Perpetrators ==
Though no group claimed responsibility for the attack, the Indian government blamed the militant outfit Lashkar-e-Taiba for carrying out the massacre.

Other accounts blamed Abdul Hamid Gada of Hizbul Mujahideen. In these accounts, the massacre was timed to coincide with Shab-e-Qadar, the holiest night of the month of Ramadan, when believers stay awake until dawn. Gada was subsequently killed by Indian security forces in 2000.

== Aftermath ==
The massacre was widely condemned by Kashmiri politicians, including Ali Mohammad Sagar, Minister for Home Affairs of J&K state who said, "More than 50 attackers stormed the village and shot and mutilated the inhabitants. They were cut to pieces...What has taken place is highly condemnable. It is shameful." The United States government also "strongly condemned" the attack and offered condolences to all victims families. The day after the incident, agitating Kashmiri Hindus clashed with police in New Delhi, broke barricades and tried to force their way to the National Human Rights Commission. At least 11 protesters were injured in the clashes.

Indian Prime Minister Inder Kumar Gujral joined the mourners in Wandhama on 28 January, accompanied by Governor K. V. Krishna Rao, Chief Minister Farooq Abdullah, and Union Minister for Environment Saifuddin Soz. Gujral said:

"I have come here to express my grief on behalf of the nation. The people of Punjab had unitedly defeated the nefarious designs of the enemy. The people of Kashmir will also defeat the designs".

Though the Kashmir Divisional Commissioner, S. L. Bhat, claimed that no one of the Kashmiri Pandit families have left the valley, despite the scare, however reports from Ganderbal suggested that many Kashmiri Pandit familiies were preparing to leave for Jammu. There were also protests in several refugee camps where Kashmiri Hindus had been living since their exodus in 1990.

Subsequently, a public dispute emerged between the Jammu and Kashmir government and the Indian Army over security arrangements in and around Wandhama. India Today reported that local Kashmiri Pandits questioned the previous removal of an Army post near Wandhama, approximately a year before the massacre. Chief Minister, Farooq Abdullah claimed that the Army had shifted its garrison despite his opposition, while the Army responded by alleging that the militants had political links in the area which had enabled them to operate with impunity. A Defence Ministry spokesman said the sound of the shooting was obscured by the loudspeakers broadcasting prayers for Shab-e-Qadr, and the army troops moved in only after noticing the fire.

The massacre also halted the Jammu and Kashmir government's rehabilitation plans to bring the displaced Kashmiri Pandits back to the Valley. On 28 January, Farooq Abdullah announced the plan would be postponed until security conditions improved. In fact, the massacre started to the second round of exodus of Kashmir Pandits from the Valley.

== Investigation and reopening ==
Following the massacre, an FIR was registered at Ganderbal Police Station, but the subsequent investigation were inconclusive, and the perpetrators were described as "untraced". Over the years, there has been repeated demands by the Hindu community to reopen the case. In 2012, the Kashmiri Pandit Sangharsh Samiti (KPSS) petitioned the Jammu and Kashmir Human Rights Commission seeking a reinvestigation. In its response, the state government informed theCommission that 20 of the 21 alleged perpetrators had been killed in encounters and that one remained absconding. However, the identity of the perpetrators was not revealed.

On 24 August 2026, the Jammu and Kashmir State Investigation Agency (SIA) reopened the investigation into the massacre, 28 years after the killings.

== See also ==
- List of terrorist incidents in Jammu and Kashmir
- 2003 Nadimarg massacre
- 1998 Prankote massacre
- Chittisinghpura massacre, another massacre in Kashmir where perpetrators wore Indian Army uniforms
- List of massacres in India

== Notes ==
International Terrorism. Darby, PA: Diane Publishing. 2001. ISBN 9780756701055.
