= List of administrators of Lakshadweep =

Lakshadweep's constitutional and executive head

Administrator of Lakshadweep
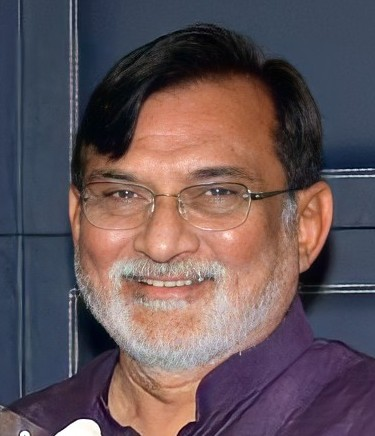
- Incumbent; Praful Khoda Patel since 5 December 2020
- Appointer: President of India
- Term length: At the pleasure of the president
- Inaugural holder: U. R. Panicker
- Formation: 1 November 1956; 69 years ago

The administrator of Lakshadweep is the constitutional and executive head of the Indian union territory of Lakshadweep. The administrator functions ex-officio as the Inspector General of Lakshadweep Police, and serves as the chairman of the Lakshadweep Development Corporation and the Society for Promotion of Recreational Tourism and Sports

== List ==
#	Portrait	Name (born- died)	Home state	From	To	Time in office
1		U. R. Panicker	Unknown	1 November 1956	7 November 1956	7 days
2		S. Mony	Unknown	8 November 1956	21 September 1958	1 year, 318 days
3		C. K. Balakrishna Nair	Unknown	22 September 1958	5 December 1961	2 years, 349 days
4		M. Ramunni (1915–2009)	Unknown	6 December 1961	8 April 1965	4 years, 3 days
5		C. H. Naire	Unknown	9 April 1965	31 October 1969	4 years, 206 days
6		K. D. Menon	Unknown	1 November 1969	30 April 1973	3 years, 181 days
7		W. Shaiza	Unknown	22 May 1973	21 June 1975	1 year, 276 days
8		M. C. Verma	Unknown	22 June 1975	14 February 1977	1 year, 237 days
9		S. D. Lakhar	Unknown	21 February 1977	30 July 1978	1 year, 161 days
10		P. M. Nair	Unknown	31 July 1978	15 June 1981	2 years, 320 days
11		Pradip Mehra	Unknown	15 June 1981	21 July 1982	1 year, 37 days
12		Omesh Saigal	Unknown	21 July 1982	9 July 1985	2 years, 354 days
13		J. Sagar	Unknown	9 July 1985	8 September 1987	2 years, 62 days
14		Wajahat Habibullah (b.1945)	Unknown	8 September 1987	31 January 1990	2 years, 146 days
15		Pradip Singh	Unknown	1 February 1990	1 May 1990	90 days
16		S. P. Aggarwal	Unknown	2 May 1990	3 May 1992	2 years, 2 days
17		Satish Chandra	Unknown	4 May 1992	9 September 1994	2 years, 129 days
18		G.S. Chima	Unknown	9 September 1994	14 June 1996	1 year, 280 days
19		Rajeev Talwar	Unknown	1 August 1996	1 June 1999	2 years, 305 days
20		R. K. Verma	Unknown	1 June 1999	20 August 1999	81 days
21		Chaman Lal	Unknown	21 August 1999	30 April 2001	1 year, 285 days
22		R. K. Verma	Unknown	30 April 2001	19 June 2001	81 days
23		K. S. Mehra	Unknown	19 June 2001	20 June 2004	3 years, 2 days
24		S. P. Singh	Unknown	21 June 2004	21 November 2004	154 days
25		Parimal Rai	Unknown	22 November 2004	11 August 2006	1 year, 263 days
26		Rajendra Kumar	Unknown	11 August 2006	21 December 2006	133 days
27		B. V. Selvaraj	Unknown	22 December 2006	16 May 2009	2 years, 145 days
28		Satya Gopal	Unknown	27 May 2009	12 July 2009	47 days
29		J. K. Dadoo	Unknown	13 July 2009	15 June 2011	1 year, 338 days
30		Amar Nath	Unknown	11 July 2011	12 July 2012	1 year, 1 day
31		H. Rajesh Prasad (1967- 2022)	Unknown	7 November 2012	22 October 2015	2 years, 350 days
32		Vijay Kumar	Unknown	25 October 2015	6 September 2016	318 days
33		Farooq Khan (born 1955)	Unknown	6 September 2016	18 July 2019	2 years, 315 days
34		Mihir Vardhan (born 1960)	Unknown	19 July 2019	2 November 2019	107 days
35		Dineshwar Sharma (1954- 2020)	Bihar	3 November 2019	4 December 2020†	1 year, 32 days
36		Praful Khoda Patel (born 1957)(Additional Charge)	Gujarat	5 December 2020	Incumbent	5 years, 321 days

== See also ==
1. Lakshadweep
