= Mihir Vardhan =

Administrator of Lakshadweep

Mihir Vardhan was the 33rd Administrator of the Indian Union Territory of Lakshadweep.

Political offices
| Preceded by Farooq Khan | Administrator of Lakshadweep; 19 July 2019 – 2 November 2019 | Succeeded by Dineshwar Sharma |
