= Rajiv Mathur =

Indian police officer and public office-holder

Chief Information Commissioner of India
- In office 22 May 2014 – 5 October 2015
- Preceded by: Sushma Singh
- Succeeded by: Vijai Sharma

Director of Intelligence Bureau
- In office January 2009 – December 2010
- Preceded by: P. C. Haldar
- Succeeded by: N. Sandhu

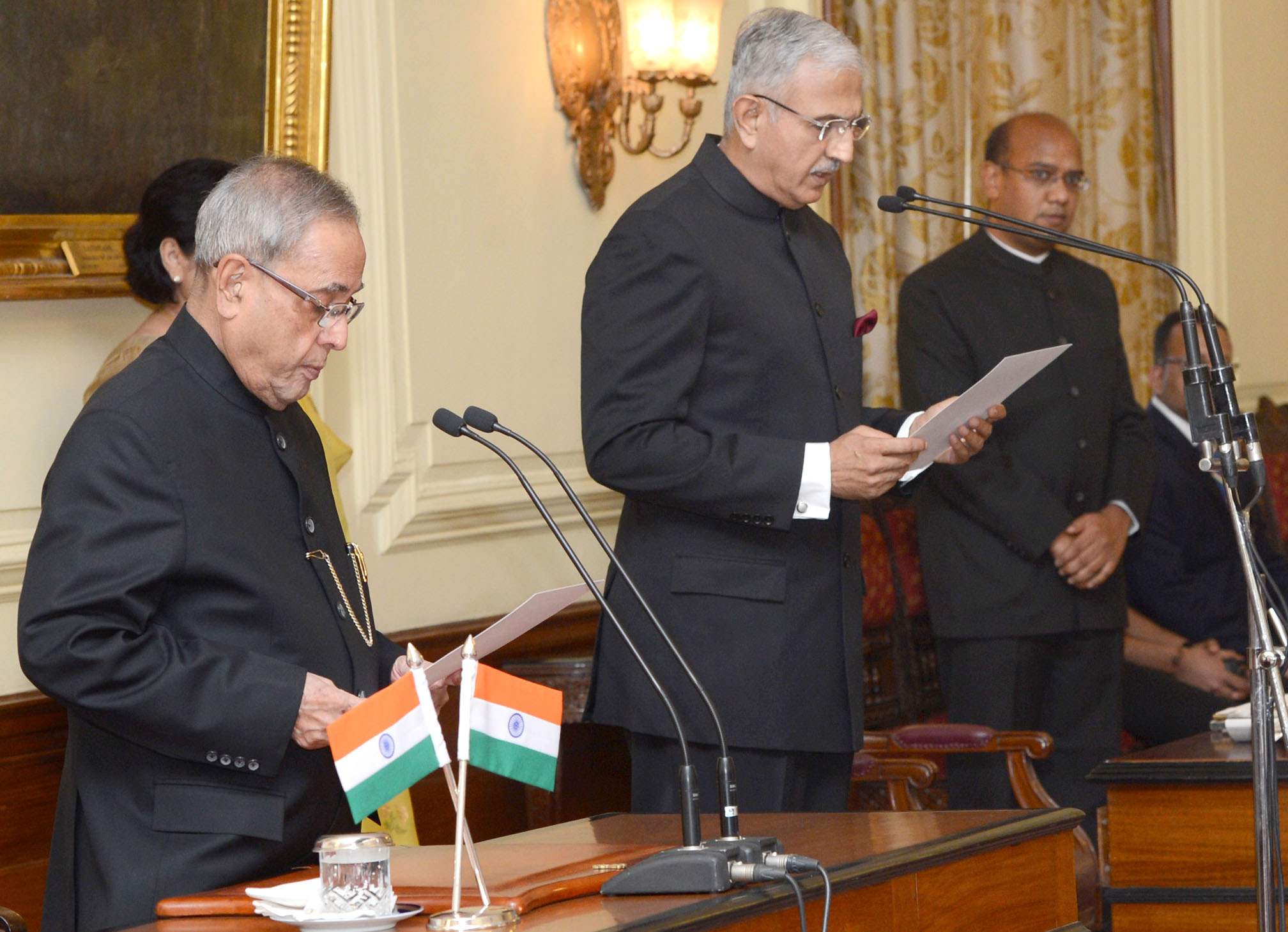
The President, Shri Pranab Mukherjee administering the oath to Shri Rajiv Mathur as Chief Information Commissioner, at a swearing-in ceremony, at Rashtrapati Bhavan, in New Delhi on May 22, 2014.

Rajiv Mathur is a 1972 batch IPS officer of Uttar Pradesh Cadre. He is a former Chief Information Commissioner of India. He served Uttar Pradesh Police since 1972 until becoming the Director of Intelligence Bureau. He also served as the Director of the Intelligence Bureau from January 2009 to December 2010.

== About ==
He is an IPS officer of 1972 batch belonging to Uttar Pradesh Cadre. He served as SP in different districts of Uttar Pradesh before becoming Director General. He was posted as Director of Intelligence Bureau in 2009.

Preceded by Sushma Singh	Chief Information Commissioner of India; 22 May 2014–5 October 2015	Succeeded by Vijai Sharma

Preceded by P. C. Haldar	Director of the Intelligence Bureau; January 2009–December, 2010	Succeeded by N. Sandhu
