= Mohammad Akbar Lone =

Indian politician (born 1947)

Member of Parliament, Lok Sabha
- In office 23 May 2019 – 4 June 2024
- Preceded by: Muzaffar Hussain Baig
- Succeeded by: Sheikh Er Rashid
- Constituency: Baramulla

Speaker of Jammu and Kashmir Legislative Assembly
- In office 2009–2013
- Preceded by: Tara Chand
- Succeeded by: Mubarak Gul

Minister Hr. Education, Government of Jammu & Kashmir
- In office 2013–2014

Deputy Speaker of Jammu and Kashmir Legislative Assembly
- In office 2002–2008

Member of Jammu and Kashmir Legislative Assembly
- In office 2002–2018

Personal details
- Born: 17 February 1947 (age 78); Naidkhai, Manzpora, sonawari
- Political party: Jammu and Kashmir National Conference
- Education: Aligarh Muslim University (B.A. LLB)

Mohammad Akbar Lone (born 17 February 1947) is a Kashmiri politician who serves the state of Jammu and Kashmir and belongs to the National Conference political party.

== Early life and education ==
Lone is from Sonawari, Bandipora district, Jammu and Kashmir. He is the son of Abdul Gani Lone. He completed his L.L.B. in 1972 at Aligarh Muslim University.

== Career ==
Lone was elected speaker of Jammu and Kashmir Legislative Assembly in 2008. He was made cabinet minister in the Omar Abdullah government on 15 January 2013 and was given portfolio of Minister in-charge of Higher Education.

In 2019, he won the Lok Sabha seat from Baramulla, in a four-cornered contest involving the PDP, BJP, Congress and five other candidates.

After the Union government revoked the special status of Jammu and Kashmir, he teamed up with fellow Lok Sabha MP, Justice Hasnain Masoodi, to file a write petition in the Supreme Court challenging the constitutionality of the revocation.

He won the 2014 Jammu and Kashmir Legislative Assembly election representing National Conference from Sonawari Assembly constituency.

== Electoral performance ==
Election	Constituency	Party	Result	Votes %	Opposition Candidate	Opposition Party	Opposition vote %	Ref
2014	Sonawari	JKNC	Won	40.53%	Yasir Reshi	JKPDP	40.02%	
2008	Sonawari	JKNC	Won	39.74%	Abid Hussain Ansari	Independent	15.71%	
2002	Sonawari	JKNC	Won	58.05%	Mohammed Yousuf Parray	JKAL	29.22%	
1996	Sonawari	JKNC	Lost	39.24%	Mohammed Yousuf Parray	JKAL	41.15%	
1983	Sonawari	JKNC	Lost	16.57%	Ghulam Rasool Bahar	JKNC	58.30%	
1977	Sonawari	JP	Lost	32.01%	Abdul Aziz Parray	JKNC	67.99%	
