= Mahesh Dixit =

Indian Police Service Officer

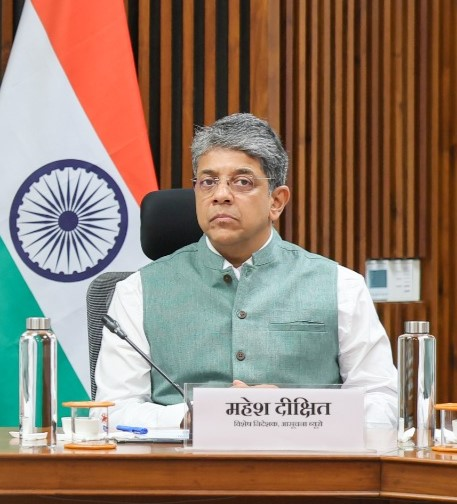
- Dixit in 2026

29th Director of the Intelligence Bureau
- Incumbent
- Assumed office 1 July, 2026
- Prime Minister: Narendra Modi
- Preceded by: Tapan Deka

Personal details
- Born: 7 August 1967 (age 59) Nashik, Maharashtra, India.
- Spouse: Rajashree Dixit
- Education: Medical Science: H.P.T. ARTS & R.Y.K. Science College, Nashik; B.J Government Medical College, Pune, (M.D.)
- Occupation: Spymaster, Bureaucrat
- Police career
- Allegiance: India
- Department: Telangana Police
- Service years: 1993 - present
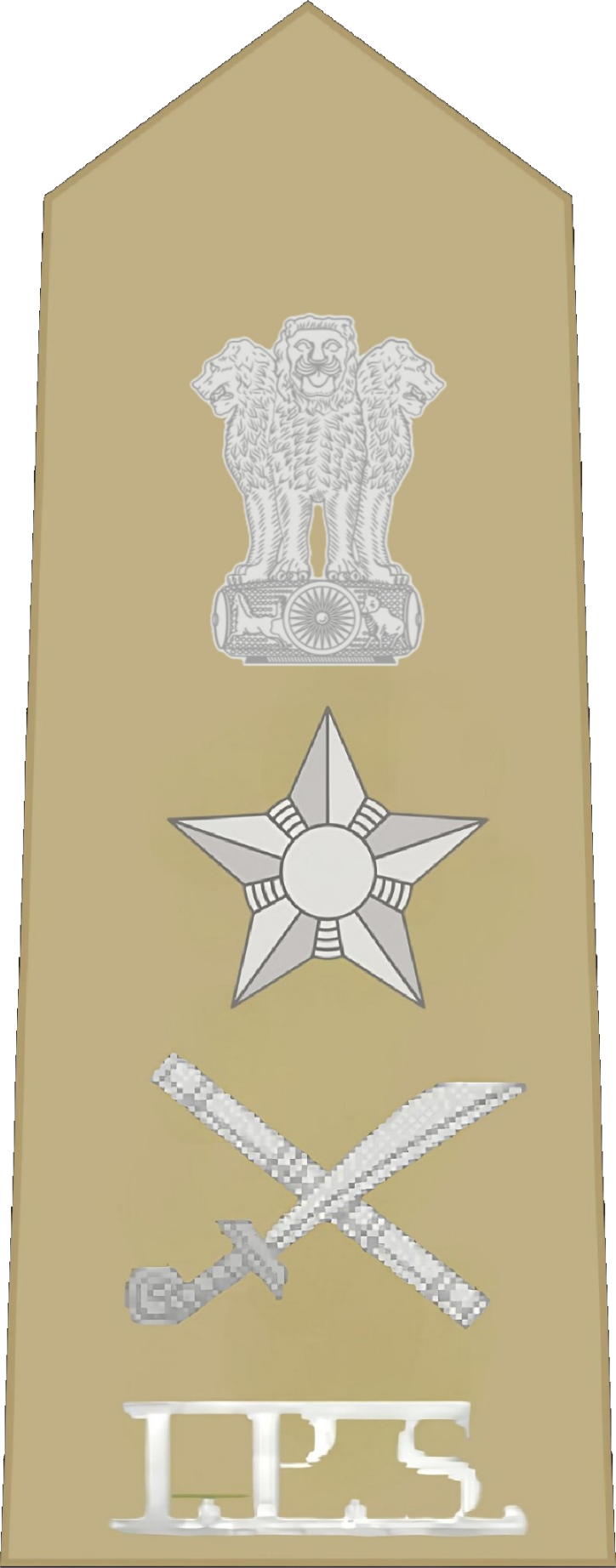
- Rank: DIB

Mahesh Dixit (born 7 August 1967) is an IPS officer and a spymaster, currently serving as the Director of the Intelligence Bureau of India.

== Early life ==
Dixit was born on 7 August 1967 in Nashik, Maharashtra.

== Education ==
Dixit completed his primary education at Rangubai Junnare School in Nashik. He later pursued a Doctor of Medicine (M.D.) degree in Psychiatry from B.J. Government Medical College, Pune, India, and completed his education at H.P.T. ARTS & R.Y.K. Science College, Nashik. He then cleared the UPSC CSE examination in 1993 with AIR 35 and choose to serve in the IPS.

== Personal life ==
Dixit is Married to Rajashree.

== Career ==
On 1 July 2026, the Appointments Committee of the Cabinet appointed Dixit as the Director of the Intelligence Bureau (DIB), succeeding Tapan Deka after the end of his tenure. Before his appointment, he was serving as the Special Director of the Intelligence Bureau.

Dixit has served in different parts of Andhra Pradesh and Telengana, including as the SP of Visakhapatnam. As SP, he led operations against Left Wing Extremism before joining the IB. In the Intelligence Bureau, he worked to counter Islamic terrorism in Hyderabad and helped build a strong counter-terrorism unit during the rise of the Indian Mujahideen and pan-Islamic groups such as HUJI.

Dixit has also headed Subsidiary Intelligence Bureaus (SIB) in Kohima and Patna, served in Moscow, and spent nearly a decade working on security matters in Jammu & Kashmir. He played an important role in operations against Pakistan-sponsored terrorism in Kashmir. He was also involved in the planning related to the abrogation of Article 370. As the head of the IB's Kashmir wing, he played a key role in the operation that neutralised the Pakistani perpetrators behind the 2025 Pahalgam massacre.

== Accolades ==
- President's Police Medal for Distinguished Service (2016).
- Police Medal for Meritorious Service (2009).
- Police Antrik Suraksha Seva Padak (2004).

== See also ==
- Tapan Deka
- Parag Jain
