= Hamid Gada =

Indian Islamist commander

- Born: Ganderbal, Jammu and Kashmir, India
- Died: 13 March 2000 Shiekhpora village, Ganderbal district, Jammu and Kashmir, India
- Allegiance: Hizbul Mujahideen (1992-2000)
- Activity years: 1992–2000
- Rank: Commander
- Conflicts: Kashmir conflict: Insurgency in Jammu and Kashmir; 1998 Wandhama massacre

Abdul Hamid Bhatt (also known as Hamid Gada (Note: Hamid Gada (حَمیٖد گاڈٕ) translates to 'Hamid the Fish'), and Bomber Khan) was a commander in the Islamist militant organisation Hizbul Mujaheddin. He was killed in an encounter on 13 March 2000 by Indian security forces. Hamid Gada, at the time of his death, was the most wanted North Kashmiri militant. He had been called "Jammu and Kashmir's most important terrorist leader" by Indian journalist Praveen Swami, responsible for the massacres of numerous Kashmiri Hindus, including the 1998 Wandhama massacre. Press Trust of India said that in total, over a period of ten years of militancy, he was responsible for killing over a hundred civilians.

== Background ==
Hamid Gada's father, Khaliq Bhatt, worked at the Kheer Bhawani temple at Tulmulla, Ganderbal, as a watchman, at one of the most sacred shrines for Kashmiri Hindus. Even after Gada joined militancy, his father continued to work at the Hindu shrine. Gada's family had worked at the Tulmulla temple for generations. Gada's brother, Fayyaz Bhatt was a police officer with Jammu and Kashmir Police's Special Operations Group . Unlike his father and brother, Gada was influenced by Jamaat-e-Islami and their propaganda and eventually joined Hizbul Mujaheddin in 1992.

== Life ==
=== Militancy ===
Anuradha Bhasin Jamwal, in a Mahanirban Calcutta Research Group publication, wrote about the circumstance under which Gada joined militancy:

In 1992, two terrorists arrived in the village, determined to burn out the temple. (Note: The temple where his father worked) Hamid Bhat stole their rifles and handed them to a friend who passed them on to central reserve police force (CRPF). The temple was saved but Hamid Bhat and his family had to pay a heavy price. He and his mother were kidnapped. The family had to sell its land to pay a ransom of Rs. 20,000. His mother was found naked, badly beaten and incoherent days later. She will not discuss just what happened. For reasons no one in the family quite understands, Hamid Bhat chose to stay on with his captors. He was, perhaps, unable to face humiliation of what had happened to his mother. Whatever the truth, the teenager who saved Tulamulla temple went on to become one of the most feared leaders of HM.

In another version of his life, it is written that, "since childhood Hameed was fascinated by this spring. (Note: 'Spring' refers to the Kheer Bhawani temple at Tulmulla) Loved it. This love was to shape his violent life." All alone, he had protected the Hindu temple from being destroyed by militants, but to protect himself and his family from the militants, he joined them and became a "killing machine". It is said he had many reasons to hate the Indian security forces, but the "most obvious one being that they didn't protect him and his family when he sought their help to escape the wrath of 'extreme' militants. So he now killed Jawans with an extra zeal and pleasure and made money from it."

Hamid Bhatt got the name "Gada", meaning "fish", after an encounter with Indian security forces:

It is said that once to escape the security men, he jumped in the syendh river near the temple and stayed under water for hours, breathing though a hollow reed. Aaja Ai Bahaar Dil hai... much like Shammi Kapoor and Rajendra Nath in that old film song. (Note: The song being referred to is Aaja Ai Bahaar Dil hai from the 1964 Bollywood movie Rajkumar. In the song (at 1:05) the same technique can be seen.) From that day on wards, people started calling him 'Hameed Gada', Hamid The Fish.

Gada and his men were responsible for the killing of police, military personnel, pro-India militants and Kashmiri Pandits. It had been Hizbuls aim to drive out the rest of the pandits in the valley.

=== 1998 Wandhama massacre ===
The 1998 Wandhama massacre was the turning tide for Gada. On Shab-e-Qadar, one of the holiest days in the Islamic calendar, 25 January, Gada and his men were responsible for the killing of non-migrant 26 Kashmiri Pandits, including women and children. The massacre turned the tide for Gada. While he got some support from people like Jammu and Kashmir Minister of State for Home Ali Mohammed Sagar, "most ordinary Kashmiris were disgusted by the action. Its sheer brutality, and the inflammatory nature of the pamphlets left at the site, showed that Gada's group had been hijacked by cadre from Pakistan, who are more rabidly communal than most Kashmiri terrorists", writes Indian journalist Praveen Swami. Gada tried to take corrective measures, distancing himself from the Pakistani cadres in Hizbul, but it was too late.

=== Death ===
For two years, Gada evaded the security forces. It was only on 13 March 2000 when a Kashmiri Muslim police constable tipped off the JKP Special Operations Group Ganderbal office with precise information about Gada's location in Shiekhpora village, Ganderbal district. Superintendent of Police (Operations) Jagtar Singh immediately cordoned off the house along with his team. The aim was to block off escape routes until the 5 Rashtriya Rifles arrived. The tactic worked. And after a five hour long encounter, the basement where Gada was, was shelled and blown up, killing Gada and two accomplices.
