= Vijai Sharma =

Indian politician (1950–2025)

Vijai Sharma IAS (Retd.)
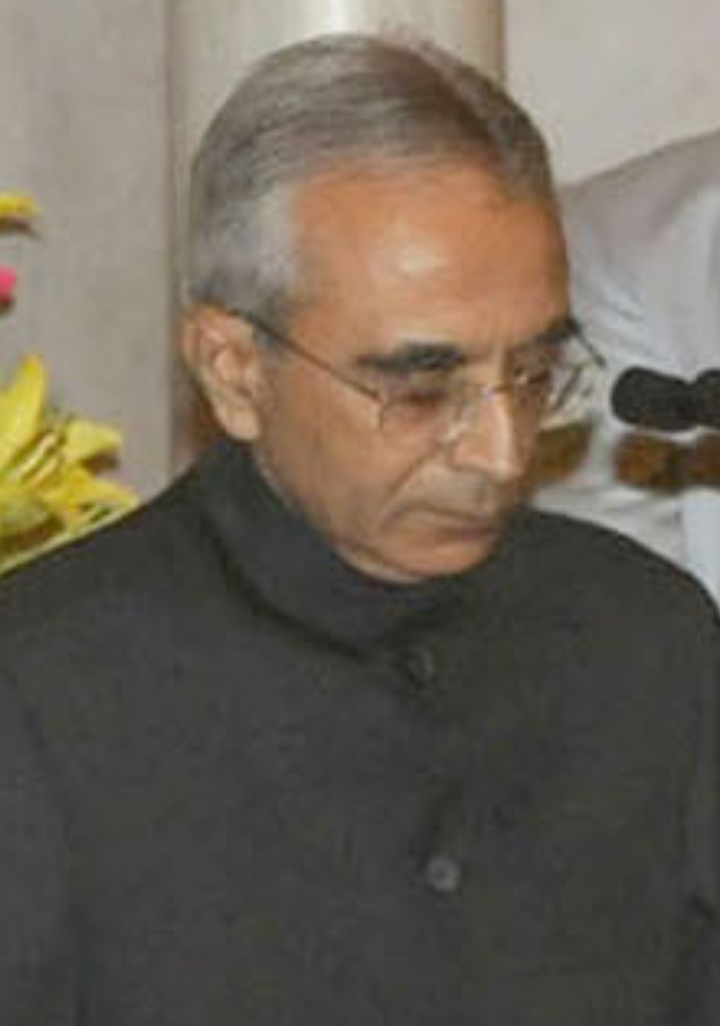

Chief Information Commissioner of India
- In office 6 October 2015 – 1 December 2015
- Preceded by: Rajiv Mathur
- Succeeded by: Radha Krishna Mathur

Environment Secretary of India
- In office 2008–2010
- Appointed by: Appointments Committee of the Cabinet
- Preceded by: Meena Gupta

Joint Secretary of Ministry of Environment and Forests of India
- In office 1997–2003
- Appointed by: Appointments Committee of the Cabinet

Personal details
- Born: 1 December 1950 (age 75) India
- Died: 18 July 2025 (aged 74) California, United States
- Education: (LLB) University of Lucknow (LLM) University College London (LLM) Harvard University

Vijai Sharma (1 December 1950 – 18 July 2025) was a retired Indian Administrative Service officer of 1974 batch from Uttar Pradesh cadre who served as the Chief Information Commissioner of India in 2015 and before that he served as the Environment Secretary of India and Joint Secretary in Ministry of Environment and Forests of India. He played a key role in the working and development of Kyoto Protocol.

== Education ==
Vijai Sharma completed his undergraduation and LLB from Lucknow University and held an LLM from UCL in London and his other LLM from Harvard University.

== Death ==
Sharma died 18 July 2025 while visiting his son in California.
