= H. Rajesh Prasad =

Indian politician (1967–2022)

Governor of Lakshadweep
- In office 7 November 2012 – 22 October 2015
- Preceded by: Amar Nath
- Succeeded by: Vijay Kumar
- Website: http://lakshadweep.nic.in/administrator.html

H. Rajesh Prasad (1 June 1967 - 28 July 2022) was an Indian politician who served as the Governor of Lakshadweep from 7 November 2012 to 22 October 2015.

== Education ==
Prasad has completed his graduation in commerce stream and further completed Master of Business Administration from Indian Institute of Management, Bangalore.

Prasad died of COVID-19 in 2022 at the age of 55.
