= Special Operations Group (Jammu and Kashmir) =

Anti-insurgency force of the J&K Police

Agency overview
- Formed: March 1994
- Employees: 2,300+

Jurisdictional structure
- Operations jurisdiction: Jammu and Kashmir (union territory)|Jammu and Kashmir

The Special Operations Group (SOG) is a police tactical unit of the Jammu and Kashmir Police (JKP) that is specialized in anti-irregular military, counterinsurgency, counterterrorism, and operating in difficult to access terrain.

The unit's missions primarily involve anti-irregular military, apprehension of armed and dangerous criminals, counterterrorism and hostage rescue crisis management, counterinsurgency, covert operation, executive protection, high-risk tactical law enforcement situations, operating in difficult to access terrain, protecting high-level meeting areas, providing security in areas at risk of attack or terrorism in Jammu and Kashmir, special reconnaissance in difficult to access and dangerous areas, support crowd control and riot control, and special operations.

This unit is approximately 2,300+ strong. It is trained and equipped to handle high stakes situations. Its personnel are chosen from more than 100,000 personnel of the JKP. The J&K police has since been very competent and on the frontlines in anti-terror activities. The SOG members are also the first targets of the militant groups and local separatists alike. Since its inception, the unit has played an important role in suppressing terrorism in J&K.

== History ==
It was raised in 1994 with the idea of "involving the passive Jammu and Kashmir Police in the anti-terrorist activities and giving a local face to these operations".

The SOG till date conducts joint operations with other security forces in the region; one example is the 13 March 2000 operation in which Hizbul Mujahideen commander Hamid Gada was killed, and the 6 May 2020 operation in which Hizbul chief Riyaz Naikoo was killed. SOG are well trained and fight shoulder to shoulder with other forces .

== Operations ==
In every district of the state, the SOG is headed by Superintendent Police (operations) or Deputy Superintendent Police (operations). The recruits of the SOG are young men from all the regions of the state and reflect Jammu and Kashmir's various ethnic groups: Kashmiris, Gujjars, Dogras and Sikhs. Many of them have been the victims of militancy in the state. The group is a volunteer force comprising police officers and policemen. The volunteers come for different reasons: some genuinely want to fight anti-India insurgents, while some are motivated by the incentives offered. In 2020, a BBC report said that every militant killed by the group earns it between ₹35,000 (US$370) and ₹50,000 (US$530), according to a police officer. Bonuses are paid for arresting the militants and capturing arms and ammunition. Other incentives for SOG personnel include out-of-turn promotions.

Whenever there is a militant attack in Jammu and Kashmir, SOG personnel are the first ones to reach the spot. In addition, SOG personnel have been regularly called in to control stone pelting incidents (usually CRPF does that in Valley) when the situation gets out of control for local police. SOG has also conducted many cordon and search operations (CASO) and raiding quickly to capture or kill (if necessary) targets in the main commercial hub of Lal Chowk. The group usually does not wear khaki uniform instead they wear camouflage uniform and cover their faces all the time. This elite force is said to set a dangerous precedent where armed officers are awarded promotions and money rewards for every terrorist eliminated. It is said to be the cause of many false shooting incidents where teenagers pelting stones are termed as violent armed terrorists.

In 2016, there were reports that SOG operations were being "thwarted" by hostile youth. In 2019, the SOG in each district of Jammu and Kashmir were given targets of "one or two terrorists they need to track and target single-mindedly". Assigning individual targets was a change from how militants were tracked previously. SOG are also given training by the National Security Guard (NSG).

== Criticism ==
=== Usage of excessive force ===
The SOG was notorious for alleged human rights violations. (Note: "wherever the forces operate, whether the army, paramilitary, or the SOG, there are (always) allegations of abuse.") So much so that JK Peoples Democratic Party (JK PDP) made it an election promise. Mehbooba Mufti, who was the PDP Vice-president at the time, was quoted saying that the first thing they would do once in power was disband the SOG.

A commission would be set up to inquire into the allegations against Special Operations Group/security forces relating to disappearances and custodial killings. We demand stern punishment for those responsible for custodial killings.

— People's Democratic Party manifesto

In 2003, when the JK PDP came into power, the SOG was disbanded. However today the SOG are considered a model anti-insurgency force which could be replicated in other states.

== Leadership ==
Farooq Khan, IPS was the first head of the Special Operations Group.

== See also ==
- Counter Insurgency Force (West Bengal)
- Special Operation Group (Odisha)
- Greyhounds (police)
- Force One (Mumbai Police)
- Punjab Police SWAT Team
- Kerala Thunderbolts
