= Ikhwan (Kashmir) =

Pro-government militia in India

Ikhwan force, popularly referred to as the Ikhwan and locally known as nabüd, was a pro-government militia in the Indian state of Jammu and Kashmir, composed of surrendered Kashmiri militants active in the insurgency in Jammu and Kashmir.

== Incorporation ==
By 1994, a section of militants who felt marginalized by the Inter-Services Intelligence's favoring of the Hizbul Mujahideen over other groups sought alternate avenues. The Ikhwan-ul-Muslimeen was formed by Mohammad Yusuf Parray, better known as Kuka Parray and by early 1994, the group sided with the Indian forces to fight the militants backed by the Pakistani government. Besides Ikhwan, other groups operated by Javed Ahmad Shah (who had the backing of the state police's Special Operations Group) and Liaqat Khan (who operated in Kashmir's Anantnag district). By the end of 1994, all three groups had merged into one entity known as Ikhwan-ul-Muslimeen.

== Activities ==
Many prominent fighters for the Ikhwan contested the 1996 elections. Kuka Parray founded the Jammu and Kashmir Awami League and won. Javed Ahmad Shah joined the National Conference.

== Disbandment ==
After the 1996 assembly elections, due to the public's detestation of their ruthless tactics and several publicity campaigns by pro-secession organisations, the Ikhwan quickly found themselves ostracised by the political establishment. The official cover for the armed group was stripped soon after by the Indian government which led to a huge spike in casualties. Ikhwan is expected to have lost over 150 members. According to a 2003 report by The Hindu, nearly 350 to 500 members of Ikhwan remained on active duty with the Jammu and Kashmir Police and the Indian Army and were paid a regular stipend.

Kuka Parray was killed by Kashmiri militants in 2003 while he was on his way to inaugurate a cricket match in Sonawari, Bandipore district. Javed Ahmad Shah was also killed a month earlier by Kashmiri militants at the Greenway Hotel in Srinagar. Liaqat Khan continues to live in Kashmir.

== Notable members ==
- Nazir Ahmad Wani

== See also ==
- Partition of India
- All Parties Hurriyat Conference
- Pakistan and state terrorism
- Timeline of the Kashmir conflict
- History of Jammu and Kashmir
- Kashmir conflict
- Indo-Pakistani wars and conflicts
