= S. P. Varma =

Indian peace activist (born 1954)

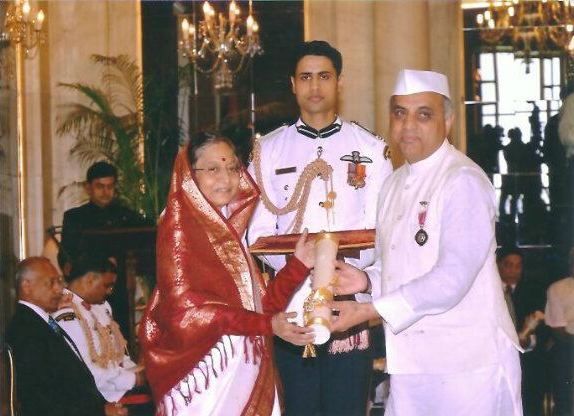
- President of India Pratibha Patil presenting Padma Shri Award to S P Varma
- Born: 25 February 1954 (age 72); Jammu, Jammu and Kashmir, India
- Awards: Padma Shri 2012, Honorary Doctorate for Peace work by DMU, England 2017

S. P. Varma is a social worker and peace activist from Jammu and Kashmir. He has been actively involved in peace-building efforts in conflict-ridden areas of the Kashmir Valley.

== Early life and career ==
In 1990, he met Nirmala Deshpande, a prominent Gandhian figure, in Jammu, which influenced his decision to leave his government job as a Civil Engineer and embrace Gandhism.

Varma organized local communities to facilitate inter-faith meetings with the aim of rebuilding trust in the troubled Kashmir Valley. He expanded this movement to other disturbed regions such as Doda, Udhampur, Rajouri, and Poonch. This success motivated him to gradually extend his efforts to other parts of India, particularly in North East India and areas affected by Naxalite insurgency.

Between 1990 and 2015, S. P. Varma coordinated National Integration Camps, Aman Melas, Peace Marches, All-faith prayers, Seminars, Conferences, Workshops, Gandhian quiz competitions, and cultural-sports events in collaboration with various agencies.

He also collaborated with Sunil Dutt, a Union Minister and noted Bollywood actor, to lead the work of Sadbhawana ke Sipahi in Jammu and Kashmir as the chairman of the local chapter.

In 2012, the Government of India recognized his contributions with the Padma Shri award. In 2017, De Montfort University, England, conferred an Honorary Doctorate (D Lit) on him for his peace work in India.

Since 2016, he has served as the NGO delegate for the Gandhi Global Family to the UN Department of Global Communication (DGC), New York.

In 2024, the Government of Jammu & Kashmir has conferred him with the prestigious State Award (Life Time Achievement Award) for his outstanding social service.

=== Voluntary Services and Awareness Programs ===
One of Varma's notable achievements is the organization of symposiums on truth and non-violence. These symposiums took place in schools, colleges, and universities across Jammu and Kashmir States from 1990 to 2015. What began as a local endeavor evolved into a national movement in 2010, thanks to support from the Union Ministry of HRD.

In April 1997, Varma organized the All India Gandhian Workers National Samelan, a significant event held at M.A. Stadium, Jammu. This gathering attracted over 25,000 Gandhian Workers from across the country. The summit featured a notable address by the then Prime Minister, Shri I.K. Gujral.

Varma provided these invaluable texts to over 100,000 individuals in Jammu and Kashmir. Additionally, Varma supplied complete sets of Mahatma Gandhi's autobiographies in different languages to numerous high-ranking dignitaries and grassroots workers.

On 20 January 2003, Varma orchestrated the Jammu and Kashmir State Sadbhavana – Ke – Sipahi convention. This event drew thousands of SKS volunteers from across the state. Distinguished figures like Hon’ble Congress President Smt. Sonia Gandhi, Jammu and Kashmir PCC President Jenab Ghulam Nabi Azad, and Dr. Manmohan Singh Ji graced the occasion. Smt. Sonia Gandhi used this platform to present the "Rajiv Gandhi State Sadbhavana Awards" to commend outstanding individuals and organizations for their work in promoting peace and harmony, regardless of political affiliations.

Under Varma's leadership, the "Bharat Jodo Abhiyan" was launched in Srinagar. This initiative saw thousands of Sadbhavana Ke Sipahi from the State come together to commemorate the sacrifices of Mahatma Gandhi, Smt. Indira Gandhi, and Sh. Rajiv Gandhi. Participants pledged to work tirelessly for the unity and integrity of the nation. Their dedication earned them recognition from Jenab Ghulam Nabi Azad, President PCC Jammu and Kashmir.

Varma had organised a variety of social awareness programs. These initiatives tackle critical issues such as Anti-Dowry systems, Save the Girl Child, Drug Abuse, Gender Equality, and Ecology Literacy.

S. P. Varma played a significant role in identifying and engaging with Veteran Gandhians and Freedom Fighters, publicly acknowledging their contributions, and harnessing their experiences to instill a sense of national pride among the younger generation.

For over 30 years, S. P. Varma has been actively involved in organizing annual events to commemorate key dates in Indian history, including:

- Celebrating Gandhi Jayanti on 2 October at Srinagar (at SKICC, Rajbagh, and Sonawar).
- Observing Martyrs Day on 30 January at Dewan – e – Aam, Mubarak Mandi Palace, Jammu.
- Celebrating Children's Day on 14 November, coinciding with the birthday of Jawaharlal Nehru, in Jammu and Srinagar. On this occasion, Nehru Youth Medals are awarded to talented youths, one per district, in recognition of their contributions to peace and harmony.

S. P. Varma has been actively involved in commemorating the birth and death anniversaries of 80 prominent freedom fighters from across the nation at various locations throughout the country.

Furthermore, S. P. Varma has played a role in fostering communal harmony by organizing joint celebrations of various national festivals, including Independence Day, Republic Day, Gandhi Jayanti, Diwali, EID, Gurupurab, Christmas, Buddha Jayanti, and Mahavir Janma Kalyanak. These celebrations involve active participation from people of all faiths, promoting unity and inclusivity.

In 2002, S. P. Varma organized the Sadbhavana Padyatra, led by Sh. Sunil Dutt, from the Golden Temple in Amritsar to the Hazratbal Shrine in Srinagar, passing through the Shri Mata Vaishno Devi Shrine.

Between 1990 and 2010, S. P. Varma actively participated in Padyatras alongside notable figures such as Didi Nirmala Deshpande, Sh. Sunil Dutt, and Sh. Sunder Lal Bahuguna. These Padyatras aimed to promote peace, harmony, and the protection of the environment, taking place in various parts of the country.

S. P. Varma also organized exposure trips for Gandhian Workers from Jammu and Kashmir to other regions of India starting in 1992, allowing them to participate in Annual Conventions.

On 17 October 2010, the Gandhians Parikrama for Peace commenced from Kanyakumari. This Parikrama sought to promote peace, harmony, integration, and raise awareness against prevailing social issues.

As the Vice President of the Gandhi Global Family, S. P. Varma coordinated the Gandhian’s Parikrama around the country, beginning from Kanyakumari and ending in Kashmir. Led by young Gandhian Shri P. Maruthi of Chennai, the journey followed the South-Eastern Ghat and Central, Western Ghat routes. This phase lasted from 17 October 2010 to 1 January 2011, spanning 110 days.

During this Parikrama, S. P. Varma led a segment through militancy-affected Jammu and Kashmir from 7 to 21 December 2010. This leg covered 18 Districts out of a total of 22 and spanned a distance of 2800 km. The route included stops at Lakhanpur, Doda, Kishtwar, Bhaderwah, Ramban, Banihal, Qazigund, Kulgam, Ahrabal, Shopian, Pulwama, Pampore, Srinagar, Baramulla, Uri, Aman Sathu, Tangmarg, Budgam, Charara-e-Sharief, Hazratbal Shrine, Chatipadshai, Kheerbhawani in Ganderbal, Shankaracharia, GOC 15 Corps HQ Srinagar, Amar Singh College Srinagar, Anantnag, Udhampur, Katra, Shri Mata Vaishno Devi, Reasi, Kalakot, Rajouri, Poonch, Chake Da Bagh, Mendhar, Rajouri, Nowshera, Sunderbani, Akhnoor, Jammu, Suchatgarh, Samba, and Kathua, before returning to Lakhanpur.

The Gandhian Parikrama initiative, led by S.P. Varma, commenced from various Indian cities, including Hyderabad, Bhubaneshwar, Siliguri, Guwahati, Dispur, Kohima, Imphal, Aizawl, Agartala, Shillong, and Itanagar. This journey covered thousands of kilometers with the primary objectives of promoting peace, harmony, and raising awareness about the eradication of social issues.

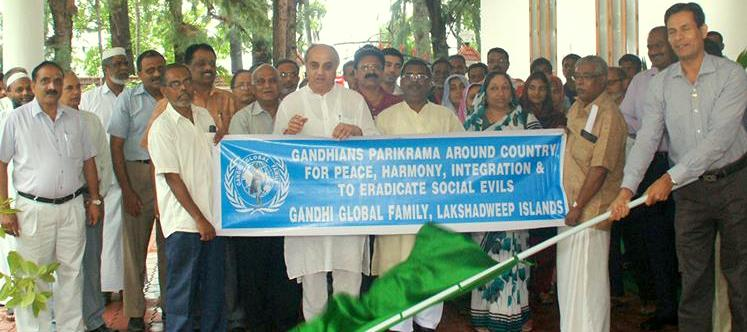
The unique Gandhian parikrama was inaugurated by Lakshadweep’s Administrator, Shri H Rajeish Prasad, with the aim of spreading Gandhian ideals across all eleven islands of the Union Territory.

The Gandhian Parikrama continued with Phase III, which covered Delhi, Chennai, the Andaman-Nicobar Islands, and returned via Kolkata.

In the final Phase IV, scheduled for 2013, the initiative aimed to encompass remaining regions of the country, including Sikkim, Bihar, Jharkhand, Goa, Diu-Daman, Dadar-Nagar Haveli, Lakshadweep Islands, and Puducherry.

The Gandhi Global Family (GGF) instituted annual awards in honor of prominent freedom fighters and national heroes, including Mahatma Gandhi, Pt. Jawaharlal Nehru, Maulana Abul Kalam Azad, Subhas Chandra Bose, Shaheed Bhagat Singh, Sardar Vallabhbhai Patel, Babu Jagjivan Ram, Dr. B.R. Ambedkar, Sh. Lal Bahadur Shastri, Smt. Indira Gandhi, Sant Vinoba Bhave, Baba Amte, Sh. Rajiv Gandhi, Swami Vivekananda, Nund Rishi, Habba Khatoon, Lal Ded, Baba Jitto, Raja Jamboo Lochan, and Mian Dido. These awards were created to recognize the selfless services provided by individuals, institutions, organizations, trusts, and others working across various fields to improve the living conditions and social status of marginalized sections of society, without regard to caste, color, creed, or gender.

Furthermore, distinguished individuals such as the Dalai Lama, former President of India Shri K R Narayanan, the first lady Speaker of India Smt. Meira Kumar, Prof. Dominic Shellard, Vice Chancellor of De Montfort University Leicester, and Mrs. Kiran Mehra Kerpelman, Director of the United Nations Information Centre for India and Bhutan, have been honored with the "Mahatma Gandhi Award" for their commendable efforts, including their contributions during times of natural disasters, such as the earthquake calamity in Jammu and Kashmir State.

One of S. P. Varma's notable achievements was leading the first delegation of Non-Resident Indians and Non-Resident Pakistanis settled in Europe, Canada, and the USA to Jammu and Kashmir State. This delegation represented a unique opportunity to engage with the diaspora and foster ties between regions.

S. P. Varma's dedication to Gandhian principles led him to spearhead Gandhian Peace Missions to several foreign countries, including Italy, France, Germany, the Netherlands, Belgium, Switzerland, Luxembourg, Bangkok, and Pakistan. These missions aimed to propagate Gandhian ideology as a means to achieve global peace. Varma's efforts emphasized the universal applicability of Gandhian values.

As a Gandhian Worker, S. P. Varma participated in international forums, such as the United Nations Organization (UNO) in Geneva and the European Union in Brussels. During these meetings, he delivered lectures on the practical implementation of Gandhian Ideology, with a specific focus on addressing conflicts and challenges in Jammu and Kashmir.

S. P. Varma's global engagements underscored his dedication to peacebuilding and the widespread dissemination of Gandhian principles on an international scale. His contributions left an indelible mark in promoting dialogue and understanding among diverse communities worldwide.

== Positions held ==
- Chairman, Sadbhavana Ke Sipahi, Jammu and Kashmir
- President Harijan Sevak Sangh, Jammu and Kashmir State, founded by Mahatma Gandhiji in 1932.
- President Gandhian Workers Society, Jammu and Kashmir State
- All India General Secretary Akhil Bharat Rachnatmak Samaj, a Gandhian Society
- Chairman Youth Hostels association of India, Jammu and Kashmir State branch; National Executive and Council member of Youth Hostels Association of India, New Delhi.
- Commissioner, Bharat Scouts and Guides, Jammu and Kashmir
- Treasurer Indian Red Cross Society Jammu
- Chairman, Jammu and Kashmir Citizens Council
- Coordinator Mahatma Gandhi Literature Campaign Committee Worldwide.
- Coordinator Gandhi Doot Medal Committee Worldwide.
- State President Gandhi Global Family, Jammu and Kashmir Chapter and Vice President Gandhi Global Family, New Delhi.
- President / Advisor to 10 reputed Public Schools / Institutions in Jammu and Kashmir State.
- Advisor, Jammu and Kashmir NGOs Federation, an umbrella organization of over hundred societies.
- Executive Member, Savodaya Mandal, Sevagram.
- Advisor Antim Jan Magazine published by Gandhi Smriti and Darshan Samiti, New Delhi

=== Awards ===
- Shri S.P.Varma is recipient of various honours and awards, prominently Padma Shri in 2012.
