= Brakpora =

Village in India

Brakpora or Brakpor is a village in Anantnag district of Jammu and Kashmir, India. It is located 3 km east of District headquarters Anantnag. 5 km from Achabal. 62 km from State capital Srinagar,.The River Arpath divides Brakpora into two parts " Balh Brakpora " and "Adh Brakpora" . Govt. Higher Secondary School Anantnag, Kendriya Vidhalaya And Many Other Major Govt. and Private Educational Institutions Are Located In This Village. Govt. Medical Facility Centre And Department Of Horticulture Also Functions In This Area. Brakpora Is Also Known For A Big Marketplace In Anantnag
