= Kuka Parray =

Indian Kashmiri politician (died 2003)

Mohammad Yusuf Parray
- Died: 13 September 2003; Hajin, Bandipore, Jammu and Kashmir, India
- Cause of death: Bullet wound
- Other name: Kuka Parray
- Known for: Counter-insurgency movement in Jammu and Kashmir, India
- Political party: Jammu & Kashmir Awami League

Mohammad Yusuf Parray, better known as Kuka Parray, also known as Jamsheed Shirazi, was an Indian politician, folk singer and a militia commander. Parray was Member of the Legislative Assembly in Jammu and Kashmir and the founder of the Jammu & Kashmir Awami League. He was also folk singer, before he founded the pro-government counter-insurgency force, Ikhwan-ul-Muslemoon, that targeted militants. His death was considered a major blow to the Indian forces in their fight against the insurgents in Jammu and Kashmir. The then Chief Minister, Mufti Mohammad Sayeed, described his murder as "a setback to the peace process".

== Death ==
Parray was on his way to inaugurate a cricket match at Sonawari in Bandipora district of Jammu and Kashmir, when the car he was traveling in was ambushed by militants He died en route to the hospital.
