= Jammu and Kashmir Awami League =

Political party in Jammu and Kashmir, India

The Jammu and Kashmir Awami League is a political party in the Indian-administered union territory of Jammu and Kashmir. The party was founded by members of different counter-insurgent groups in November 1995. It supports article 370 of the Indian constitution, granting special status to Jammu and Kashmir. The party argues that the people of Jammu and Kashmir have the right to self-determination within the Indian constitutional framework, but not accession to Pakistan nor independence.

== History and organization ==
The party was founded by members of different counter-insurgent groups in November 1995. Mohammad Yusuf Parray (alias Kuka Parray), the chief of Ikhwan-ul-Musalmoon, was the founding chairman of the party. Mir Niyazi, a former Hizbul Mujahideen commander, became the general secretary and Javed Hussain Shah its vice chairman.

On 20 April 1996 the new party held its first larger election meeting at its office in Srinagar. The meeting was attacked by militants, who threw a hand grenade and fired gunshots. Two people were injured in the attack.

After the merger of Ikhwan-ul-Musalmoon and Hilal Haider's South Kashmir Ikhwan, Hyder's political wing the Awami Conference merged into the J&K Awami League. On 30 July 1996 the party made public its leadership; Kuku Parray as chairman, Mir Ghulam Nabi Niyazi as general secretary, Javed Hussain Shah as senior vice chairman, Abdul Hameed Rather as junior vice chairman, S.K. Tikoo as official spokesperson and Abdur Rashid Misgar as chief organiser.

The party was recognised by the Election Commission of India as a state party in Jammu and Kashmir on 21 August 1996. The party fielded 27 candidates in the 1996 Jammu and Kashmir Legislative election. In total they obtained 60,437 votes (2.43% of the votes). Parray won the Sonawari seat. At the time of the election, the Jammu and Kashmir Pradesh Congress president Ghulam Rasool Kar labelled to party as 'a government outfit' in an interview.

== 1998 Indian general election ==
Abdul Majid Gawali stood at the candidate of the party in the 1998 Indian general election in the Baramulla seat. He finished in third place with 20,843 votes (6.87%). In the Lok Sabha elections held in 1999 the party contested the Baramulla, Srinagar and Anantnag seats. The candidates obtained 28,889 votes in total (1.84% of the votes).

== 2002 Legislative Assembly election ==
Usman Abdul Majid and Hilal Haider split away from the party, forming the Awami Conference. However, they returned to the J&K Awami League in March 2002. In the 2002 Legislative Assembly election, the party ran nine candidates. Parray lost the Sonawari seat but Usman Abdul Majid won the nearby Bandipora seat. In total the candidates of the party got 24,121 votes (0.91% of the votes). During this period Parray became increasingly vocal in criticizing the Indian government, stating that they had used former militants for its own purposes.

Javed Hussain Shah was killed in August 2003. Parray was killed on 13 September 2003. Other persons killed in the attack were Mohammed Akram (general secretary of the party) and Ali Mohammad.

== 2004 Lok Sabha election ==
In the 2004 Lok Sabha election the party presented a single candidate; Peer Ali Shah in the Srinagar seat. He obtained 1,519 votes (0.78% of the votes in the constituency). Likewise the party fielded one candidate in the 2008 Legislative Assembly election, Kuka Parray's 26-year-old son Imtiaz Ahmed Parray in Sonewari. Parray finished in third place with 6,472 votes (12.79% of the votes in the constituency).

As of 2010 Uttam Chand Talotra was the chairman of the minority cell of the party.
