= Intelligence Bureau (India) =

India's domestic intelligence agency

- Emblem of the Government of India

- Seal of the Intelligence Bureau

Intelligence agency overview
- Formed: 23 December 1887; 138 years ago
- Superseding Intelligence agency: Research & Analysis Wing (R&AW) (Note: Foreign Intelligence operations were transferred to R&AW from the IB, in 1968)
- Type: Internal Intelligence agency
- Jurisdiction: Government of India
- Headquarters: New Delhi
- Motto: Jāgṛtaṃ Aharniśaṃ (Sanskrit) transl. "Always Alert"
- Employees: Classified
- Annual budget: ▲₹6,782.43 crore (US$700 million) (2026–27)
- Minister responsible: Amit Shah, Minister of Home Affairs
- Intelligence agency executive: Mahesh Dixit, IPS, Director
- Parent department: Ministry of Home Affairs (MHA)
- Child Intelligence agency: Subsidiary Intelligence Bureau (SIB)
- Website: www.mha.gov.in/en

The Intelligence Bureau (IB) is India's internal security and counterintelligence agency under the Ministry of Home Affairs. It was founded in 1887 as the Central Special Branch. The IB is often regarded as the oldest existing intelligence organisation in the world.

Until 1968, it handled both domestic and foreign intelligence after which the Research and Analysis Wing was formed specifically for foreign intelligence; following that, the IB was primarily assigned the role of domestic intelligence and internal security. Mahesh Dixit is the current director of the IB, since June 2026.

== History ==
The Intelligence Bureau traces its origin to the Central Special Branch, established on 23 December 1887 by the British government in India to gather intelligence on political unrest, particularly after the formation of the Indian National Congress in 1885. Its creation followed Secret Dispatch No. 11, dated 25 March 1887, in which R. A. Cross, the Secretary of State for India, sanctioned the proposal by Marquess of Dufferin, the Viceroy of India, to create a system for the "collection of secret and political intelligence in India".

Dufferin proposed utilizing the Indian Imperial Police and political officers in princely states for the "collection of intelligence on political, social and religious movements". He recommended the establishment of "special agencies" at both central and provincial headquarters, assigning local governments the responsibility of intelligence collection and obliging them to report relevant findings to the central government. The Provincial Special Branches, under local government control, were tasked with sharing intelligence with the Central Special Branch.

Dufferin modelled the agency after the Third Section of Imperial Russia. To reduce expenses, the agency shared the manpower and facilities of the existing Thuggee and Dacoity Department, headquartered at Shimla. The general superintendent of the department was entrusted with the supervision of the Central Special Branch. His proposed annual budget was ₹46,800. Donald McCracken, a police officer from the Punjab cadre, was appointed as its first head. McCracken was the assistant to the general superintendent, Colonel P. D. Henderson. The Provincial Special Branches were attached to the offices of either the inspector general of police or the chief secretary of the respective provinces.

In 1904, based on the recommendations of the Indian Police Commission (1902–1903) chaired by Andrew Fraser, the Central Criminal Intelligence Department—also known as the Department of Criminal Intelligence (DCI)—was established. This reorganization led to the abolition of the Thuggee and Dacoity Department and the merger of the Central Special Branch into the DCI. Additionally, Criminal Investigation Departments (CID) were created in the provinces. Initially, Provincial Special Branches were incorporated into the CIDs, headed by a Deputy Inspector General (DIG), but they were later separated as their functions evolved.

Section 40(2) of the Government of India Act 1919 stated that "the Intelligence Bureau should keep the Government posted with matters relating to the security of the Indian Empire." Reflecting this directive, the DCI was renamed the Intelligence Bureau in 1920, a year before the act formally came into force in 1921. In the 1920s, the IB's role was reduced to primarily relaying intelligence to the Indian Political Intelligence (IPI) office in London, which was responsible for analyzing intelligence, and acted as a liaison between the IPI and the Government of India. Following the implementation of provincial autonomy under the Government of India Act 1935, the IB began assigning officers designated as Central Intelligence Officers to the provinces starting in 1937.

The IB, initially also referred to as the Delhi Intelligence Bureau (DIB), was placed under the Home Department and reported directly to the Governor-General of India. After India gained independence in 1947, the IB came under the Ministry of Home Affairs, with T. G. Sanjeevi Pillai becoming its first Indian director. Until 1968, the IB was responsible for both internal and external intelligence. However, shortcomings in its external intelligence, particularly in foreseeing Chinese movements before the Indo-China War of 1962 led to the creation of the Research and Analysis Wing (R&AW) in 1968, dedicated to external intelligence.

== Organisation ==
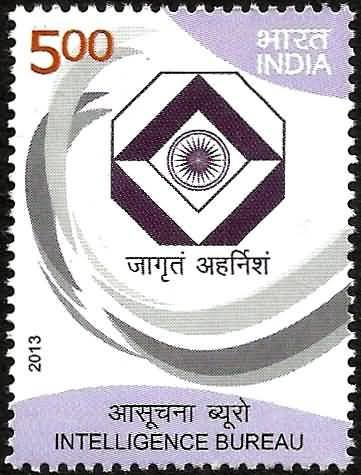
125th Anniversary Postage Stamp (2013)

The IB is a constitutional body under the Schedule VII of the Constitution of India. The Union List within Schedule VII includes "Central Bureau of Intelligence". IB is also listed in the Schedule of the Intelligence Organisations (Restriction of Rights) Act, 1985, which recognizes organisations "established by the central government for purposes of intelligence or counter-intelligence". The IB functions under the Ministry of Home Affairs and is headed by a Director of the Intelligence Bureau. According to the Government of India, IB is a civilian organization without police powers.

Though IB operates under the Ministry of Home Affairs (MHA), in practice, the director of the IB is a member of the Joint Intelligence Committee (JIC) and the Steering Committee. The director has the authority to brief the Prime Minister when necessary. The organization operates at both state and national levels. Most of the intelligence collection is handled by Group C officers, including Security Assistants and Junior Intelligence Officers and Group B officers, such as Assistant Central Intelligence Officers. Higher-level coordination and management are carried out by Group A gazetted officers, such as Deputy Central Intelligence Officers, Assistant Director, Deputy Director, Joint Director, Additional Director, Special Director and the Director. At the state level, IB officers are part of the State Special Bureau and report to a Central Intelligence Officer, who acts as the intelligence advisor to the Governor. The IB maintains field units and headquarters, usually under the control of Joint or Deputy Directors.

=== Rank structure ===
Insignia	Position in Intelligence Bureau	Position in Police Service	Grade/level on pay matrix	Basic Pay
	Director of Intelligence Bureau	No equivalent position	Apex scale (Pay level 17)	₹225,000 (US$2,300)
	Special Director	Director general of police	HAG+ Scale (pay level 16)	₹205,400 (US$2,100)—₹224,400 (US$2,300)
	Additional Director	Additional director general of police	HAG scale (pay level 15)	₹182,200 (US$1,900)—₹224,100 (US$2,300)
	Joint Director	Inspector general of police	Senior administrative grade (pay level 14)	₹144,200 (US$1,500)—₹218,200 (US$2,300)
	Deputy Director	Deputy inspector general of police	Super time scale (pay level 13A)	₹131,100 (US$1,400)—₹216,600 (US$2,200)
	Joint Deputy Director	Deputy inspector general of police (Note: Joint- Deputy inspector general of police as it is above AD and due to the word Deputy Director in it. The Supreme Court has ruled that a "conscious decision" by a competent authority to equate posts sets their true rank, regardless of later pay-scale mergers.)	Selection grade (pay level 13)	₹123,100 (US$1,300)—₹215,900 (US$2,200)
	Assistant Director	Senior Superintendent of Police (Note: Additional - Deputy Inspector General of Police Designation Equivalence: The 3rd Pay Commission (Vol. II, p. 157) explicitly positioned the Assistant Director (IB) above the AIG/SP/Commandant, defining it as an Additional DIG functional tier; Legal Baseline: In State of UP v. Virendra Bahadur Katheria (2024), the Supreme Court ruled that a "conscious decision" by a competent authority to equate posts establishes their true rank regardless of later pay mergers. Uniform Protocol: Following IPS rules, an Senior Scale i.e. AD with 15+ years of service in group A wears the State Emblem and two stars, the definitive insignia of an SSP.)	Junior administrative grade (pay level 12)	₹78,800 (US$820)—₹208,700 (US$2,200)
	Deputy Central Intelligence Officer	Additional superintendent of police	Senior time scale (pay level 11)	₹67,700 (US$700)—₹208,700 (US$2,200)
	Assistant Central Intelligence Officer I	Deputy superintendent of police	Junior time scale (pay level 10)	₹56,100 (US$580)—₹132,000 (US$1,400)
	Assistant Central Intelligence Officer II	Inspector of Police	Group 'B' Non-gazetted (pay level 7)	₹44,900 (US$470)—₹142,400 (US$1,500)
	Junior Intelligence Officer I	Sub-inspector of police	Group 'B' Non-gazetted (pay level 6)	₹35,400 (US$370)—₹112,400 (US$1,200)
	Junior Intelligence Officer II	Assistant sub-inspector of police	Group 'C' Non-gazetted (pay level 5)	₹29,200 (US$300)—₹92,300 (US$960)
	Senior Security Assistant	Head constable	Group 'C' Non-gazetted (pay level 4)	₹25,500 (US$260)—₹81,100 (US$840)
	Security Assistant	Constable	Group 'C' Non-gazetted (pay level 3)	₹21,700 (US$230)—₹69,100 (US$720)

== Responsibilities ==
Shrouded in secrecy, the IB is used to garner intelligence from within India and also execute counter-intelligence and counter-terrorism tasks. The Bureau comprises employees from law enforcement agencies, mostly from the Indian Police Service (IPS), the Indian Revenue Service (IRS), the Central Armed Police Forces (CAPF) and the Indian Armed Forces. However, the Director of Intelligence Bureau (DIB) has always been an IPS officer. In addition to domestic intelligence responsibilities, the IB is particularly tasked with intelligence collection in border areas, following the 1951 recommendations of the Himmat Singh Ji Committee (also known as the North and North-East Border Committee), a task entrusted to the military intelligence organisations before independence in 1947.

All spheres of human activity within India and in the neighbourhood are allocated to the charter of duties of the Intelligence Bureau. The IB was also tasked with other external intelligence responsibilities from 1951 until 1968 when the Research and Analysis Wing was formed.

== Activities and operations ==
Understanding of the shadowy workings of the IB is largely speculative. Many times even bureau members and their family members are unaware of their whereabouts.

One known task of the IB is to clear licences to amateur radio enthusiasts.

The IB also passes intelligence between other Indian intelligence agencies and the police. The bureau also grants the necessary security clearances to Indian diplomats and judges before they take the oath. On rare occasions, IB officers interact with the media during a crisis. The IB is also rumoured to intercept and open around 6,000 letters daily. It also has an email spying system similar to the FBI's Carnivore system. The bureau is authorised to conduct wiretapping without a warrant.

The IB was initially India's internal and external intelligence agency. Due to lapses on the part of the Intelligence Bureau to predict the Sino-Indian War of 1962, and later on, intelligence failure in the Indo-Pakistani war of 1965, it was bifurcated in 1968 and entrusted with the task of internal intelligence only. The external intelligence branch was handed to the newly created the Research and Analysis Wing.

The IB operated a counterintelligence programme to prevent the CIA from gathering information about the preparations and activities related to the Indian nuclear weapons project, before the Pokhran-II nuclear tests.

The IB had mixed success in counterterrorism. It was reported in 2008 that the IB had been successful in busting terror modules. It alerted the police before the Hyderabad blasts and gave repeated warnings of a possible attack on Mumbai through the sea before the 2008 Mumbai attacks. On the whole, however, the IB came in for some sharp criticism by the media after the relentless wave of terror attacks in 2008. The government came close to sacking top intelligence officials soon after the 26/11 attacks, because of serious lapses that led to the 2008 Mumbai attacks. Heavy politics, under-funding and a shortage of field agents were the chief problems facing the agency. The overall strength of the agency is believed to be around 25,000, with 3500-odd field agents operating in the entire country. Of these, many were engaged in political intelligence.

Since 2014, the IB has undergone many reforms and changes. One of the biggest reforms was the cessation of internal political espionage. The agency has also boosted its infrastructure and recruited more agents. It has been successful in stopping the earlier pattern of frequent terror attacks in India. The agency has also been successful in counterintelligence.

== In popular culture ==
The Intelligence Bureau has been depicted in films such as Bad Aur Badnam (Hindi, 1984), Mukhbiir (Hindi, 2008), Vandae Maatharam (Tamil, 2010), Kahaani (Hindi, 2012), Jism 2 (Hindi, 2012), Iru Mugan (Tamil, 2016), Spyder (Tamil, Telugu, 2017), India's Most Wanted (Hindi, 2019), IB71, Dhurandhar (Hindi, 2026) and its sequel Dhurandhar: The Revenge (Hindi, 2026).

IB also featured in the Sony TV Series Yudh, starring Amitabh Bachchan.

== See also ==
- Indian Intelligence Community
- National Technical Research Organisation

== Footnotes ==
- "THE INDIAN POLICE SERVICE (UNIFORM) RULES". 1954. Archived from the original on 16 April 2009.
- "World Intelligence and Security Agencies". December 2006. Archived from the original on 5 June 2014.
