= Director of the Special Protection Group =

Seniormost non-elected official of India's external intelligence agency

Director of the Special Protection Group of India
- Logo of SPG

- Flag of SPG
- Incumbent; Alok Sharma, IPS since 17th November, 2023
- Cabinet Secretariat; Special Protection Group
- Status: Director of SPG
- Reports to: Prime Minister of India; Secretary (Security)
- Residence: Classified
- Seat: 9, Race Course Road, New Delhi
- Appointer: Appointments Committee of the Cabinet
- Term length: Typically 3-4 years, can be extended
- Inaugural holder: S. Subramanian, IPS
- Formation: 1985
- Succession: 25th (on the Indian order of precedence)
- Salary: ₹225,000 (US$2,300) monthly
- Website: spg.nic.in/aboutus.htm

The Director of the Special Protection Group (Vishesh Suraksha Dal ke Nirdeshak) is the de facto head of India’s elite security force, the Special Protection Group, which is responsible for providing close protection to the Prime Minister and their immediate family. As the top authority, the Director oversees strategic planning, threat assessment, and coordination with other security and intelligence agencies. The current director is Alok Sharma since November 2023.

The Director of the Special Protection Group reports to the Secretary (Security), who serves as the de jure head of the SPG. The current Secretary (S) is Rajiv Singh, IPS.

== History ==
After the assassination of Prime Minister Indira Gandhi in October 1984, a review by the Ministry of Home Affairs recommended an exclusive unit for the Prime Minister’s security. In February 1985, the Birbal Nath Committee proposed the creation of the Special Protection Unit (SPU), which was formally established as the Special Protection Group (SPG) on 30 March 1985 under the Cabinet Secretariat with 819 posts. The SPG was headed by a Director, typically an Indian Police Service officer of Director General rank. S. Subramanian, then Joint Director (VIP Security) of the Intelligence Bureau, became its first Director.

== Power and responsibilities ==
The Director of the Special Protection Group is assisted by Deputy Directors, Assistant Directors, and Joint Assistant Directors and his/her role includes:

- Operations – Responsible for close protection duties, including sub-units for Communications, Technical, and Transport.
- Training – Conducts continuous training in physical fitness, marksmanship, anti-sabotage measures, communications, and other close protection skills.
- Intelligence and Tours – Handles threat assessment, internal intelligence, and personnel verification.
- Administration – Manages human resources, finance, procurement, and related administrative matters.

== Emolument, accommodation and perquisites ==
The Director of SPG holds the rank of Director General of Police (DGP) to the Government of India. The post is accompanied by:

- Official residence.
- Security cover as per central government rules.
- Eligibility for a diplomatic or official passport for foreign travel.
- Salary as per Pay Level 17 of the 7th Pay Commission.

Director of SPG monthly pay and allowances
Base Salary (Per month)	Pay Matrix Level
₹225,000 (US$2,300)	Pay Level 17

== List of Directors of SPG ==
S.No.	Name	Assumed office	Left office	Prime Minister(s)
1	S. Subramanian	1985	1986	Rajiv Gandhi
2	Devendra Singh	1986	1990	Rajiv Gandhi
3	Trinath Mishra	1990	1993	V. P. Singh; Chandra Shekhar; P. V. Narasimha Rao
4	S. N. Tiwari	1993	1994	P. V. Narasimha Rao
5	Shyamal Datta	1994	1997	P. V. Narasimha Rao; Atal Bihari Vajpayee; H. D. Deve Gowda; I. K. Gujral
6	M. R. Reddy	1997	2000	I. K. Gujral; Atal Bihari Vajpayee
7	T. K. Mitra	2000	2002	Atal Bihari Vajpayee
8	R. K. Das	2002	2004	Atal Bihari Vajpayee
9	B. V. Wanchoo	2004	2011	Manmohan Singh
10	K. Durga Prasad	2011	2014	Manmohan Singh
11	Vivek Srivastava	2014	2016	Narendra Modi
12	Arun Kumar Sinha	2016	2023	Narendra Modi
13	Alok Sharma	2023	Incumbent	Narendra Modi

== See also ==
- Secretary of the Research & Analysis Wing
- Director of the Intelligence Bureau
- Director General of the National Investigation Agency
