= Alok Sharma (police officer) =

Indian Police Service officer

Director of the Special Protection Group
- Incumbent
- Assumed office 17 November 2023
- Preceded by: Arun Kumar Sinha

Personal details
- Born: 15 June 1966 (age 60) Aligarh, Uttar Pradesh
- Spouse: Seema Gupta
- Parent: V.Dayal (father)
- Education: B.SC; B.Tech (MECH), Aligarh Muslim University (AMU)
- Awards: Parakram Padak (Wound Medal) (2016); Police Medal for Distinguished Service; Police Medal for Meritorious Service; DG'S Commendation Disc Silver; Ati Utkrisht Seva Padak (2020)

Military service
- Allegiance: India
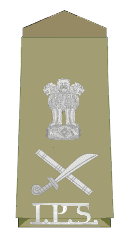
- Rank: Director General of Police

Alok Sharma (born 15 June 1966) is a 1991-batch Indian Police Service (IPS) officer of the Uttar Pradesh cadre who has been the Director of the Special Protection Group (SPG) India since 17 November 2023.

== Early life and education ==
Sharma was born on 15 June 1966 at the V.Dayal's family in Anoop region, the village of Roopvaas, Aligarh, Uttar Pradesh. He completed a B.Tech in mechanical engineering and a B.Sc degree from Aligarh Muslim University. He is married to Seema Gupta, daughter of Shanti Swaroop Gupta, the former Vice-Chancellor of Dr. Bhimrao Ambedkar University.

== Career ==
Sharma has held various higher posts in the central government or state government, and in November 2023, the Appointments Committee of the Cabinet appointed Sharma as the director general of Special Protection Group (SPG).

== Recognition ==
Sharma has received medals from the government for his services.

- Parakram Padak (Wound Medal) (2016)
- Police Medal for Distinguished Service
- Police Medal for Meritorious Service
- DG'S Commendation Disc Silver
- Ati Utkrisht Seva Padak (2020)
