= Arun Kumar Sinha =

Arun Kumar Sinha may refer to:

- Arun Kumar Sinha (politician)
- Arun Kumar Sinha (police officer)
