= B. V. Wanchoo =

Indian politician (born 1951)

B.V. Wanchoo
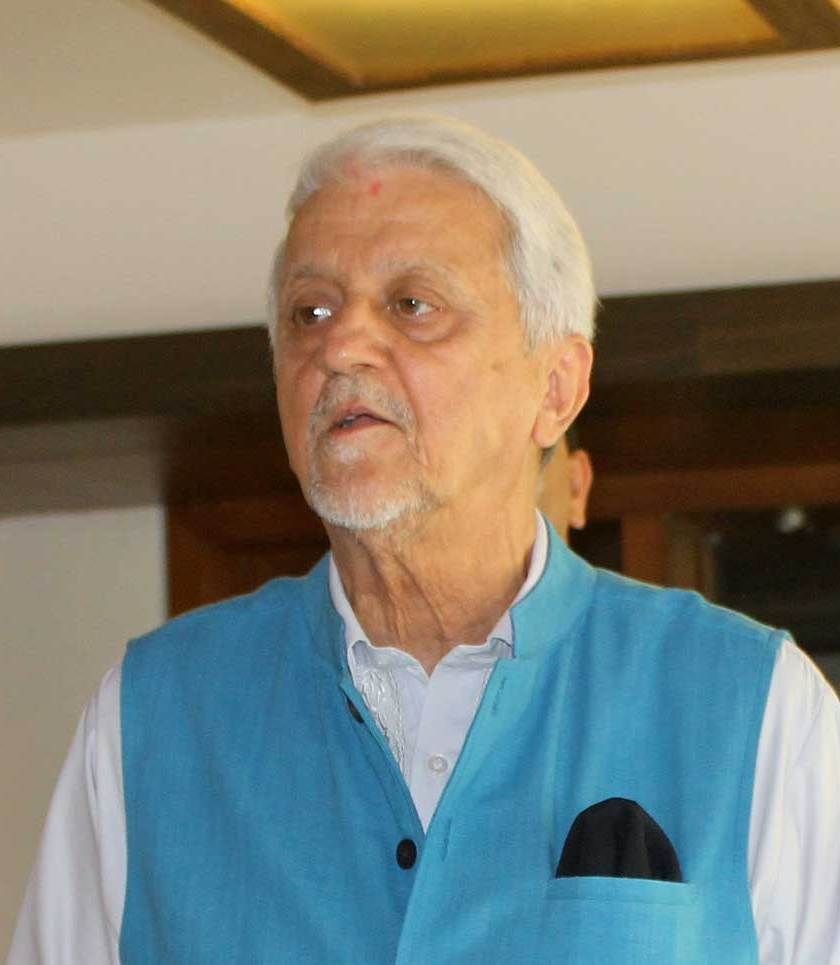
- Wanchoo in 2014

Governor of Goa
- In office 4 May 2012 – 4 June 2014
- Preceded by: K Sankaranarayanan
- Succeeded by: Margaret Alva

Personal details
- Born: 15 October 1951 (age 74)
- Spouse: Nalini Wanchoo
- Education: Scindia School, Delhi University, Sardar Vallabhbhai Patel National Police Academy

Bharat Vir Wanchoo (born 15 October 1951), better known as B.V. Wanchoo, is an Indian politician who served as the Governor of Goa from May 2012 to July 2014. Formerly, he was the director of the Special Protection Group until 2011.

== Personal life ==
Wanchoo was born on 15 October 1951. He studied at the Scindia School in Gwalior and is a post-graduate in History from the Delhi University. He is married to Nalini Wanchoo.

== Career ==
Wanchoo belongs to the 1976 batch of the Indian Police Service from the West Bengal cadre. He was posted in the Intelligence Bureau when he was asked to join the Special Protection Group set up in 1985 after the assassination of Prime Minister Indira Gandhi. He has served in various positions in the Special Protection Group since then, and is considered to be close to the Gandhi family. He was transferred out in November 1997 but brought back to the SPG in February 1998 at Sonia Gandhi's request. Wanchoo alternated between postings in the IB and the SPG, serving these two organisations for 13 and 18 years respectively. Wanchoo was appointed Director of the SPG in 2004 for an initial two-year term but continued in that post for seven years till his retirement on 31 October 2011.

== Governor of Goa ==
On 4 May 2012, Wanchoo took charge as Governor of Goa. His tenure as Governor of Goa was appreciated by many including a Bharatiya Janata Party MLA from Goa and he was also called the best Governor the state ever had. He was questioned by the Central Bureau of Investigation on 4 July 2014 as a witness in connection with the 2013 Indian helicopter bribery scandal. He resigned the same day (4 July 2014) from the position of Governor of Goa.

== Honours and awards ==
- Awarded the Indian Police Medal in 1993
- Awarded the President's Police Medal in 2001
- 'Tonk Cup' at the Sardar Vallabhbhai Patel National Police Academy for being the best horse rider of his batch.
