= S. Subramanian =

Police chief in India

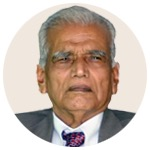
Dr. S. Subramanian

Dr. Somasundaram Subramainian was a Police chief in India who served as the founding Director of the elite Special Protection Group (SPG), among other responsibilities and has the rare distinction of having headed three central police organisations in India.

He is an Indian Police Service Officer of the 1958 Batch, of the Andhra Pradesh Cadre. Apart from senior positions at Sardar Vallabhbhai Patel National Police Academy, Hyderabad, Central Bureau of Investigation and the Intelligence Bureau, he served as the Director General of the National Security Guard (NSG), the Director General Central Reserve Police Force (CRPF) and also as the first Director of the Special Protection Group when it was formed in 1985.

He was awarded Padmashri in 1986.
