= Prime Minister of India =

Head of government

- Bhārata Gaṇarājya kē Pradhānamantrī (ISO)
- Logo of the Prime Minister of India

- Flag of India

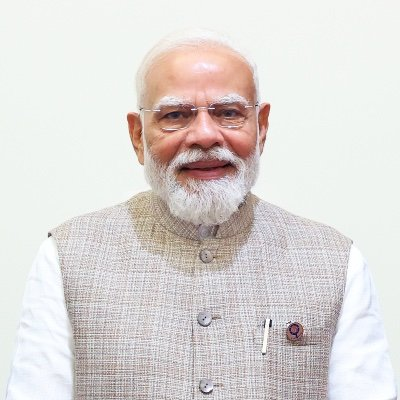
- Incumbent; Narendra Modi since 26 May 2014
- Prime Minister's Office; Union Council of Ministers; Executive branch of the Union Government
- Style: The Honourable (formal); Mr. Prime Minister (informal); His Excellency (diplomatic)
- Type: Head of government
- Abbreviation: PM
- Member of: Parliament of India; Union Council of Ministers; Planning Commission
- Reports to: The President; The Vice President; Parliament
- Residence: Panchavati
- Seat: Seva Teerth, New Delhi
- Nominator: MPs of the Lok Sabha
- Appointer: President of India; Based on ability to hold majority in the Lok Sabha
- Term length: At the pleasure of the president; Lok Sabha term is 5 years unless dissolved earlier; No term limits specified
- Constituting instrument: Articles 74 & 75 of the Constitution of India
- Precursor: Secretary of State for India and Vice President of the Executive Council
- Formation: 15 August 1947; 79 years ago
- First holder: Jawaharlal Nehru
- Deputy: Deputy Prime Minister
- Salary: ₹280,000 (US$2,900) per month; ₹3,360,000 (US$35,000) per year
- Website: pmindia.gov.in

The prime minister of India (ISO: Bhāratīya Gaṇarājyasya Pradhānamantrī) is the head of government of the Republic of India. Executive authority is vested in the prime minister and the Union Council of Ministers, despite the President of India being the nominal head of state. The prime minister has to be a member of one of the houses of bicameral Parliament of India, alongside heading the respective house. The prime minister and the cabinet are at all times responsible to the Lok Sabha, the lower house of the Parliament.

The sitting prime minister ranks third in the Order of Precedence of India and is appointed by the president of India; however, the prime minister has to enjoy the confidence of the majority of Lok Sabha members, who are directly elected every five years, lest the prime minister shall resign. The prime minister can be a member of the Lok Sabha or the Rajya Sabha, the upper house of the parliament. The prime minister controls the selection and dismissal of members of the Union Council of Ministers and allocation of posts to members within the government.

The longest-serving prime minister was the first prime minister, Jawaharlal Nehru, whose tenure lasted 16 years and 286 days. His premiership was followed by Lal Bahadur Shastri's short tenure and Indira Gandhi's 11- and 4-year-long tenures, with both politicians belonging to the Indian National Congress. After Indira Gandhi's assassination, her son Rajiv Gandhi took charge until 1989, when a decade with five unstable governments began. This was followed by the full terms of P. V. Narasimha Rao, Atal Bihari Vajpayee, Manmohan Singh, and Narendra Modi, who is the current prime minister of India, serving since 26 May 2014. He is the first non-Congress leader to become PM after consecutive general elections and secure a third successive term (2014, 2019, 2024). The first prime minister to do so was Jawaharlal Nehru, who secured successive terms following the victory in the general elections of 1946, 1952, 1957, and 1962.

== Origins and history ==
India follows a parliamentary system in which the prime minister is the presiding head of the government and chief of the executive of the government. In such systems, the head of state, or, the head of state's official representative (i.e., the monarch, president, or governor-general) usually holds a purely ceremonial position and acts, on most matters, only on the advice of the prime minister.

The prime minister must become a member of parliament within six months of beginning their tenure, if they are not one already. A prime minister is expected to work with other central ministers to ensure the passage of bills by the parliament.

=== 1947–1984 ===
Since 1947, there have been 14 different prime ministers. (Note: Not including Gulzarilal Nanda who served, twice, as acting prime minister.) The first few decades after 1947 saw the Indian National Congress' (INC) near complete domination over the political map of India. India's first prime minister, Jawaharlal Nehru, took oath on 15 August 1947. Nehru went on to serve as prime minister for 17 consecutive years, winning four general elections in the process. His tenure ended in May 1964, on his death. After the death of Nehru, Lal Bahadur Shastri, a former home minister and a leader of the Congress party, ascended to the position of prime minister. Shastri's tenure saw the Indo-Pakistani War of 1965. Shashtri subsequently died of a reported heart attack in Tashkent, after signing the Tashkent Declaration.

After Shastri, Indira Gandhi, Nehru's daughter, was elected as the country's third prime minister. The first, and to date, the only, woman to hold the post, Indira's first term in office lasted 11 years, in which she took steps such as nationalisation of banks; end of allowances and political posts, which were received by members of the royal families of the erstwhile princely states of the British Indian Empire. In addition, events such as the Indo-Pakistani War of 1971; the establishment of a sovereign Bangladesh; accession of Sikkim to India, through a referendum in 1975; and India's first nuclear test in Pokhran occurred during Indira's first term. In 1975, amid growing unrest and a court order declaring Indira's election to the Lok Sabha void, President Fakhruddin Ali Ahmed, on Indira's advice, imposed a state of emergency, therefore bestowing the government with the power to rule by decree; this period is known for human rights violations such as mass sterilisation and the imprisonment of Indira's political opponents.

After widespread protests, the emergency was lifted in 1977, and a general election was held. All of the political parties of the opposition, after the conclusion of the emergency, fought together against the Congress, under the umbrella of the Janata Party, in the general election of 1977, and were successful in defeating the Congress. Subsequently, Morarji Desai, a former deputy prime minister, became the first non-Congress prime minister of India. Desai's government was composed of groups with opposite ideologies, in which unity and coordination were difficult to maintain. Ultimately, after two and a half years as PM; on 28 July 1979, Desai tendered his resignation to the president; and his government fell. Thereafter, Charan Singh, a deputy prime minister in Desai's cabinet, with outside, conditional support from Congress, proved a majority in Lok Sabha and took oath as prime minister. However, Congress pulled its support shortly after, and Singh had to resign; he had a tenure of 5 months, the shortest in the history of the office.

In 1980, after a three-year absence, the Congress returned to power with an absolute majority. Indira Gandhi was elected prime minister a second time. In June 1984, Operation Blue Star, an Indian Army operation against Sikh militants inside the Golden Temple, the most sacred site in Sikhism, was conducted, resulting in reportedly thousands of deaths, both of the militants and civilians. In revenge, on 31 October of that year, Gandhi was shot dead by Satwant Singh and Beant Singh, two of her bodyguards, in the garden of her residence at 1, Safdarjung Road, New Delhi.

=== 1984–1999 ===
After Indira, Rajiv, her eldest son and 40 years old at the time, was sworn in on the evening of 31 October 1984, becoming the youngest person ever to hold the office of prime minister. Rajiv immediately called for a general election. In the subsequent general election, the Congress secured a supermajority, winning 401 of 552 seats in the Lok Sabha, the maximum number received by any party in the history of India. Vishwanath Pratap Singh, first finance minister and then later defence minister in Gandhi's cabinet, uncovered irregularities, in what became known as the Bofors scandal, during his stint at the Ministry of Defence; Singh was subsequently expelled from Congress and formed the Janata Dal and, with the help of several anti-Congress parties, also formed the National Front, a coalition of many political parties.

In the general election of 1989, the National Front, with outside support from the Bharatiya Janata Party (BJP) and the Left Front, came to power. V. P. Singh was elected prime minister. During a tenure of less than a year, Singh and his government accepted the Mandal Commission's recommendations. Singh's tenure came to an end after he ordered the arrest of BJP member Lal Krishna Advani, as a result, BJP withdrew its outside support to the government, V. P. Singh lost the subsequent vote-of-no-confidence 146–320 and had to resign. After V. P. Singh's resignation, Chandra Shekhar along with 64 members of parliament (MPs) floated the Samajwadi Janata Party (Rashtriya), and proved a majority in the Lok Sabha with support from Congress. But Shekhar's premiership did not last long, Congress proceeded to withdraw its support; Shekhar's government fell as a result, and new elections were announced.

Rajiv Gandhi was assassinated on the campaign trail for the general election of 1991, and the Congress, under the leadership of P. V. Narasimha Rao, rode a sympathy wave to form a minority government; Rao became the first PM of South Indian origin. After the dissolution of the Soviet Union, India was on the brink of bankruptcy, so, Rao took steps to liberalise the economy, and appointed Manmohan Singh, an economist and a former governor of the Reserve Bank of India, as finance minister. Rao and Singh then took various steps to liberalise the economy, these resulted in unprecedented economic growth in India. His premiership, however, was also a witness to the demolition of the Babri Masjid, which resulted in the death of about 2,000 people. Rao, however, did complete five continuous years in office, becoming the first prime minister outside of the Nehru—Gandhi family to do so.

After the end of Rao's tenure in May 1996, the nation saw four prime ministers in a span of three years, viz., two tenures of Atal Bihari Vajpayee; one tenure of H. D. Deve Gowda from 1 June 1996 to 21 April 1997; and one tenure of I. K. Gujral from 21 April 1997 to 19 March 1998. The government of Prime Minister Vajpayee—elected in 1998—took some concrete steps; in May 1998, after a month in power, the government announced the conduct of five underground nuclear explosions in Pokhran. In response to these tests, many western countries, including the United States, imposed economic sanctions on India, but, due to the support received from Russia, France, the Gulf countries and some other nations, the sanctions, were largely, not considered successful. A few months later in response to the Indian nuclear tests, Pakistan also conducted nuclear tests. Given the deteriorating situation between the two countries, the governments tried to improve bilateral relations. In February 1999, India and Pakistan signed the Lahore Declaration, in which the two countries announced their intention to annul mutual enmity, increase trade and use their nuclear capabilities for peaceful purposes.

In May 1999, All India Anna Dravida Munnetra Kazhagam leader J. Jayalalithaa withdrew from the ruling National Democratic Alliance (NDA) coalition; Vajpayee's government, hence, became a caretaker one after losing a motion-of-no-confidence 269–270, this coincided with the Kargil War with Pakistan. In the subsequent October 1999 general election, the BJP-led NDA and its affiliated parties secured a comfortable majority in the Lok Sabha, winning 299 of 543 seats in the lower house.

=== 2000–present ===
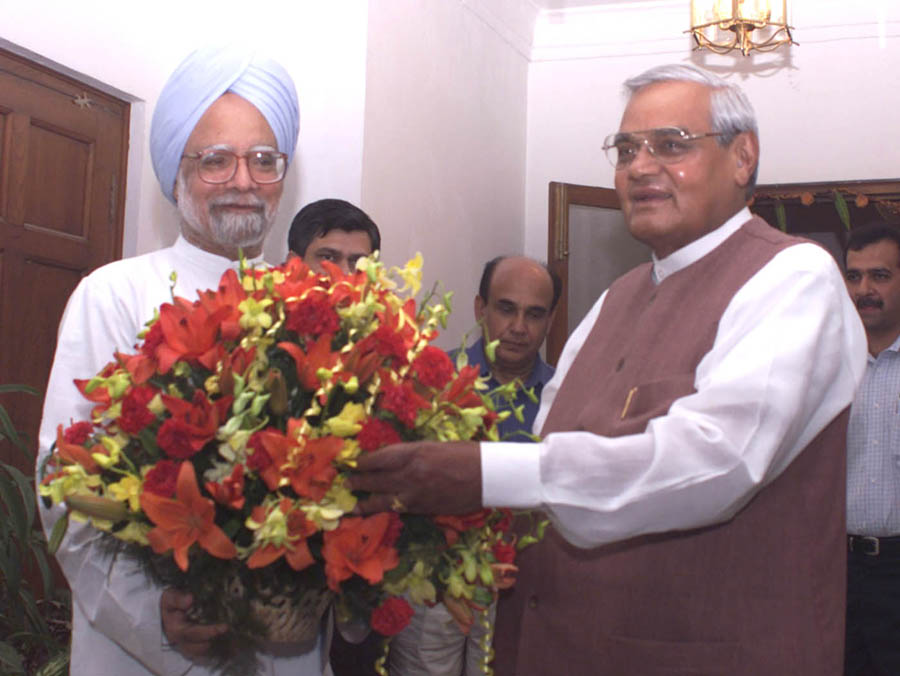
Former Prime Minister Manmohan Singh with the former Prime Minister Atal Bihari Vajpayee in New Delhi on May 24, 2004

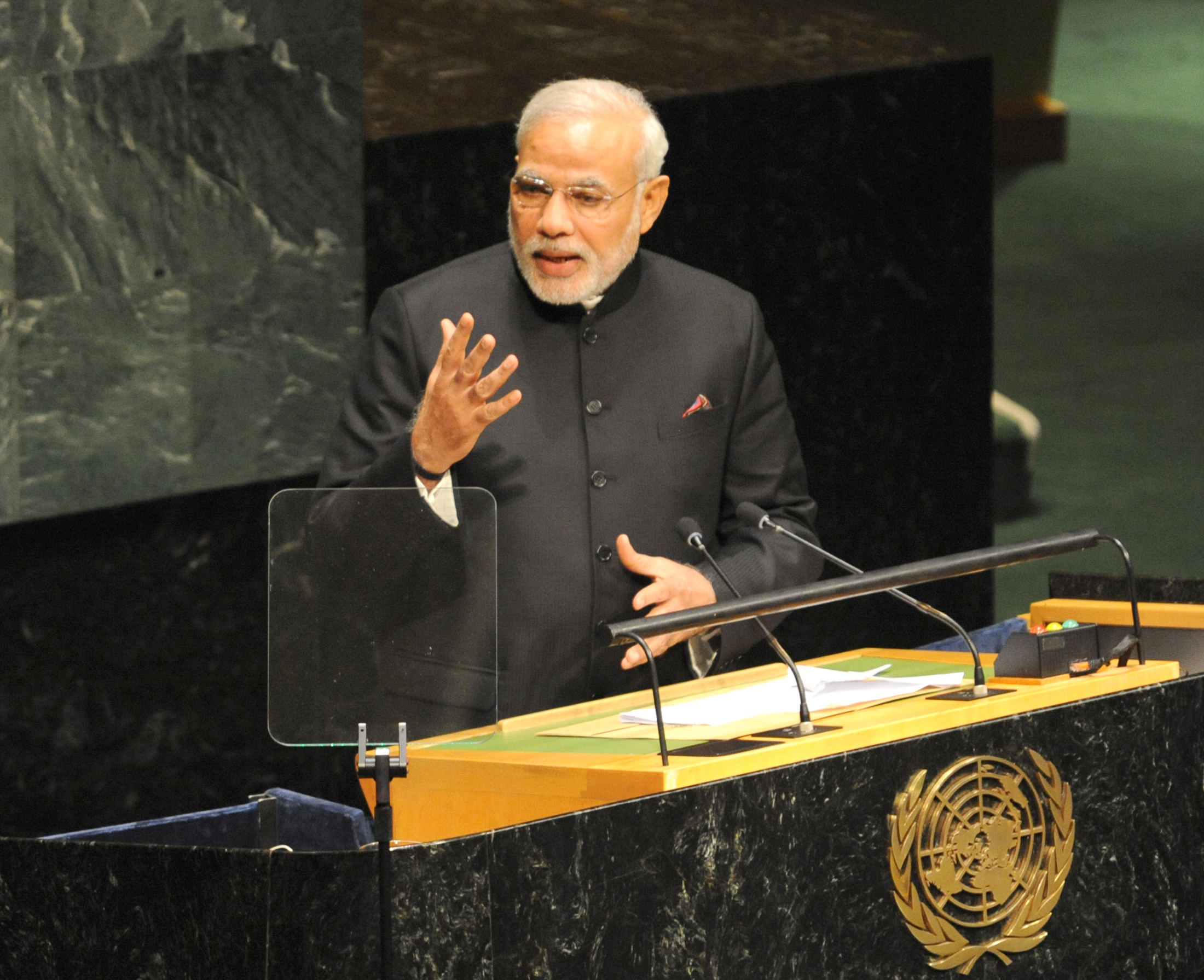
Prime minister Narendra Modi addressing the 69th United Nations General Assembly, c. 2014

Vajpayee continued the process of economic liberalisation during his reign, resulting in economic growth. In addition to the development of infrastructure and basic facilities, the government took several steps to improve the infrastructure of the country, such as, the National Highways Development Project (NHDP) and the Pradhan Mantri Gram Sadak Yojana (PMGSY; IAST: Pradhānamaṃtrī Grāma Saḍaka Yojanā; lit. Prime Minister Rural Road Scheme), for the development of roads. But during his reign, the 2002 Gujarat communal riots in the state of Gujarat took place; resulting in about 2,000 deaths. Vajpayee's tenure as prime minister came to an end in May 2004, making him the first non-Congress PM to complete a full five-year tenure.

In the 2004 election, the Congress emerged as the largest party in a hung parliament; the Congress-led United Progressive Alliance (UPA), with outside support from the Left Front, the Samajwadi Party (SP) and Bahujan Samaj Party (BSP) among others, proved a majority in the Lok Sabha, and Manmohan Singh was elected prime minister; becoming the first Sikh prime minister of the nation. During his tenure, the country retained the economic momentum gained during Prime Minister Vajpayee's tenure. Apart from this, the government succeeded in getting the National Rural Employment Guarantee Act, 2005, and the Right to Information Act, 2005 passed in the parliament. Further, the government strengthened India's relations with nations like Afghanistan, Russia, the Gulf States, and the United States, culminating with the ratification of India–United States Civil Nuclear Agreement near the end of Singh's first term. At the same time, the November 2008 Mumbai terrorist attacks also happened during Singh's first term in office. In the general election of 2009, the mandate of UPA increased. Prime Minister Singh's second term, however, was surrounded by accusations of high-level scandals and corruption. Singh resigned as prime minister on 17 May 2014, after Congress' defeat in the 2014 general election.

In the general election of 2014, the BJP-led NDA won an absolute majority, winning 336 out of 543 Lok Sabha seats. The BJP became the first party since 1984 to secure a majority in the Lok Sabha. Narendra Modi, then the Chief Minister of Gujarat, was elected prime minister, becoming the first prime minister to have been born in an independent India.

Narendra Modi was re-elected as prime minister in 2019 with a bigger mandate than that of 2014. The BJP-led NDA won 354 seats out of which the BJP secured 303 seats.

== List ==
Key

- No.: Incumbent number
- ^{†} Assassinated or died in office
- ^{§} Returned to office after a previous non-consecutive term
- ^{RES} Resigned
- ^{NC} Resigned following a no-confidence motion

Portrait	Name (born – died) Constituency	Age when assumed office	Term of office Duration in years and days			Election	Concurrent ministerial positions	Party	Ministry	Head of State (Tenure)
	Jawaharlal Nehru (1889–1964) MP for United Provinces (1947–1952) and Phulpur	57 years 274 days	15 August 1947	27 May 1964^{[†]}	16 years 286 days	–	External and Commonwealth Affairs; Defence (1952–1955, 1957); Finance (1958)	Indian National Congress	Nehru I	King George VI (1947–1950)
	Jawaharlal Nehru (1889–1964) MP for United Provinces (1947–1952) and Phulpur	57 years 274 days	15 August 1947	27 May 1964^{[†]}	16 years 286 days	–	External and Commonwealth Affairs; Defence (1952–1955, 1957); Finance (1958)	Indian National Congress	Nehru I	Rajendra Prasad (1950–1962)
	Jawaharlal Nehru (1889–1964) MP for United Provinces (1947–1952) and Phulpur	57 years 274 days	15 August 1947	27 May 1964^{[†]}	16 years 286 days	1951–52	External and Commonwealth Affairs; Defence (1952–1955, 1957); Finance (1958)	Indian National Congress	Nehru II	Rajendra Prasad (1950–1962)
	Jawaharlal Nehru (1889–1964) MP for United Provinces (1947–1952) and Phulpur	57 years 274 days	15 August 1947	27 May 1964^{[†]}	16 years 286 days	1957	External and Commonwealth Affairs; Defence (1952–1955, 1957); Finance (1958)	Indian National Congress	Nehru III	Rajendra Prasad (1950–1962)
	Jawaharlal Nehru (1889–1964) MP for United Provinces (1947–1952) and Phulpur	57 years 274 days	15 August 1947	27 May 1964^{[†]}	16 years 286 days	1962	External and Commonwealth Affairs; Defence (1952–1955, 1957); Finance (1958)	Indian National Congress	Nehru IV	Sarvepalli Radhakrishnan (1962–1967)
	Gulzarilal Nanda (acting) (1898–1998) MP for Sabarkantha	65 years, 328 days	27 May 1964	9 June 1964^{[DIS]}	13 days	–	Home Affairs; External Affairs; Atomic Energy	Indian National Congress	Nanda I	Sarvepalli Radhakrishnan (1962–1967)
	Lal Bahadur Shastri (1904–1966) MP for Allahabad	59 years 251 days	9 June 1964	11 January 1966^{[†]}	1 year, 216 days	–	External Affairs (1964)	Indian National Congress	Shastri	Sarvepalli Radhakrishnan (1962–1967)
	Gulzarilal Nanda (acting) (1898–1998) MP for Sabarkantha	67 years, 191 days	11 January 1966	24 January 1966^{[DIS]}	13 days	–	Minister of Home Affairs; Minister of Atomic Energy	Indian National Congress	Nanda II	Sarvepalli Radhakrishnan (1962–1967)
	Indira Gandhi (1917–1984) MP for Uttar Pradesh (Rajya Sabha, 1966–1967) MP for Rae Bareli (1967–1977)	48 years, 66 days	24 January 1966	24 March 1977	11 years, 59 days	–	External Affairs (1967–1969); Finance (1970); Home Affairs (1970–1973); Information and Broadcasting (1971–1974); Defence (1975)	Indian National Congress	Indira I	Sarvepalli Radhakrishnan (1962–1967)
	Indira Gandhi (1917–1984) MP for Uttar Pradesh (Rajya Sabha, 1966–1967) MP for Rae Bareli (1967–1977)	48 years, 66 days	24 January 1966	24 March 1977	11 years, 59 days	1967	External Affairs (1967–1969); Finance (1970); Home Affairs (1970–1973); Information and Broadcasting (1971–1974); Defence (1975)	Indian National Congress	Indira II	Zakir Husain (1967–1969)
	Indira Gandhi (1917–1984) MP for Uttar Pradesh (Rajya Sabha, 1966–1967) MP for Rae Bareli (1967–1977)	48 years, 66 days	24 January 1966	24 March 1977	11 years, 59 days	1967	External Affairs (1967–1969); Finance (1970); Home Affairs (1970–1973); Information and Broadcasting (1971–1974); Defence (1975)	Indian National Congress	Indira II	V. V. Giri (1969) (acting)
	Indira Gandhi (1917–1984) MP for Uttar Pradesh (Rajya Sabha, 1966–1967) MP for Rae Bareli (1967–1977)	48 years, 66 days	24 January 1966	24 March 1977	11 years, 59 days	1967	External Affairs (1967–1969); Finance (1970); Home Affairs (1970–1973); Information and Broadcasting (1971–1974); Defence (1975)	Indian National Congress	Indira II	Mohammad Hidayatullah (1969) (acting)
	Indira Gandhi (1917–1984) MP for Uttar Pradesh (Rajya Sabha, 1966–1967) MP for Rae Bareli (1967–1977)	48 years, 66 days	24 January 1966	24 March 1977	11 years, 59 days	1967	External Affairs (1967–1969); Finance (1970); Home Affairs (1970–1973); Information and Broadcasting (1971–1974); Defence (1975)	Indian National Congress	Indira II	V. V. Giri (1969–1974)
	Indira Gandhi (1917–1984) MP for Uttar Pradesh (Rajya Sabha, 1966–1967) MP for Rae Bareli (1967–1977)	48 years, 66 days	24 January 1966	24 March 1977	11 years, 59 days	1971	External Affairs (1967–1969); Finance (1970); Home Affairs (1970–1973); Information and Broadcasting (1971–1974); Defence (1975)	Indian National Congress (R)	Indira III	V. V. Giri (1969–1974)
	Indira Gandhi (1917–1984) MP for Uttar Pradesh (Rajya Sabha, 1966–1967) MP for Rae Bareli (1967–1977)	48 years, 66 days	24 January 1966	24 March 1977	11 years, 59 days	1971	External Affairs (1967–1969); Finance (1970); Home Affairs (1970–1973); Information and Broadcasting (1971–1974); Defence (1975)	Indian National Congress (R)	Indira III	Fakhruddin Ali Ahmed (1974–1977)
	Indira Gandhi (1917–1984) MP for Uttar Pradesh (Rajya Sabha, 1966–1967) MP for Rae Bareli (1967–1977)	48 years, 66 days	24 January 1966	24 March 1977	11 years, 59 days	1971	External Affairs (1967–1969); Finance (1970); Home Affairs (1970–1973); Information and Broadcasting (1971–1974); Defence (1975)	Indian National Congress (R)	Indira III	B. D. Jatti (1977) (acting)
	Morarji Desai (1896–1995) MP for Surat	81 years, 24 days	24 March 1977	28 July 1979^{[RES]}	2 years, 126 days	1977	Finance (1977, 1979); Home Affairs (1978–1979)	Janata Party	Desai	B. D. Jatti (1977) (acting)
	Morarji Desai (1896–1995) MP for Surat	81 years, 24 days	24 March 1977	28 July 1979^{[RES]}	2 years, 126 days	1977	Finance (1977, 1979); Home Affairs (1978–1979)	Janata Party	Desai	Neelam Sanjiva Reddy (1977–1982)
	Charan Singh (1902–1987) MP for Baghpat	76 years, 217 days	28 July 1979	14 January 1980^{[RES]}	170 days	–	None	Janata Party (Secular)	Charan	Neelam Sanjiva Reddy (1977–1982)
	Indira Gandhi (1917–1984) MP for Medak	62 years, 56 days	14 January 1980^{[§]}	31 October 1984^{[†]}	4 years, 291 days	1980	Defence (1980–1982); External Affairs (1984)	Indian National Congress (I)	Indira IV	Neelam Sanjiva Reddy (1977–1982)
	Indira Gandhi (1917–1984) MP for Medak	62 years, 56 days	14 January 1980^{[§]}	31 October 1984^{[†]}	4 years, 291 days	1980	Defence (1980–1982); External Affairs (1984)	Indian National Congress (I)	Indira IV	Zail Singh (1982-1987)
	Rajiv Gandhi (1944–1991) MP for Amethi	40 years, 72 days	31 October 1984	2 December 1989	5 years, 32 days	–	External Affairs (1984–1985, 1987–1988); Tourism, Civil Aviation and Commerce (1984–1985); Environment and Forests (1984–1986); Defence (1985–1987); Finance (1987)	Indian National Congress (I)	Rajiv I	Zail Singh (1982-1987)
	Rajiv Gandhi (1944–1991) MP for Amethi	40 years, 72 days	31 October 1984	2 December 1989	5 years, 32 days	1984	External Affairs (1984–1985, 1987–1988); Tourism, Civil Aviation and Commerce (1984–1985); Environment and Forests (1984–1986); Defence (1985–1987); Finance (1987)	Indian National Congress (I)	Rajiv II	Ramaswamy Venkataraman (1987–1992)
	V. P. Singh (1931–2008) MP for Fatehpur	58 years, 160 days	2 December 1989	10 November 1990^{[NC]}	343 days	1989	Defence; Human Resource Development; External Affairs (1989)	Janata Dal	Vishwanath	Ramaswamy Venkataraman (1987–1992)
	Chandra Shekhar (1927–2007) MP for Ballia	63 years, 207 days	10 November 1990	21 June 1991^{[RES]}	223 days	–	External Affairs (1990)	Samajwadi Janata Party (Rashtriya)	Chandra Shekhar	Ramaswamy Venkataraman (1987–1992)
	P. V. Narasimha Rao (1921–2004) MP for Nandyal	69 years, 358 days	21 June 1991	16 May 1996	4 years, 330 days	1991	Chemicals and Fertilizers (1991–1994); External Affairs (1992–1993); Defence (1993–1996); Railways (1995–1996)	Indian National Congress (I)	Rao	Ramaswamy Venkataraman (1987–1992)
	P. V. Narasimha Rao (1921–2004) MP for Nandyal	69 years, 358 days	21 June 1991	16 May 1996	4 years, 330 days	1991	Chemicals and Fertilizers (1991–1994); External Affairs (1992–1993); Defence (1993–1996); Railways (1995–1996)	Indian National Congress (I)	Rao	Shankar Dayal Sharma (1992–1997)
	Atal Bihari Vajpayee (1924–2018) MP for Lucknow	71 years, 143 days	16 May 1996	1 June 1996^{[RES]}	16 days	1996	Chemicals and Fertilizers; Textiles; Commerce and Industry	Bharatiya Janata Party	Vajpayee I	Shankar Dayal Sharma (1992–1997)
	H. D. Deve Gowda (born 1933) MP for Karnataka (Rajya Sabha)	63 years, 14 days	1 June 1996	21 April 1997^{[RES]}	324 days	–	Home Affairs (1996); Agriculture (1996); Textiles (1996); Urban Development (1996–1997)	Janata Dal (United Front)	Deve Gowda	Shankar Dayal Sharma (1992–1997)
	Inder Kumar Gujral (1919–2012) MP for Bihar (Rajya Sabha)	77 years, 138 days	21 April 1997	19 March 1998^{[RES]}	332 days	–	Personnel, Public Grievances and Pensions; External Affairs; Finance (1997)	Janata Dal (United Front)	Gujral	Shankar Dayal Sharma (1992–1997)
	Inder Kumar Gujral (1919–2012) MP for Bihar (Rajya Sabha)	77 years, 138 days	21 April 1997	19 March 1998^{[RES]}	332 days	–	Personnel, Public Grievances and Pensions; External Affairs; Finance (1997)	Janata Dal (United Front)	Gujral	K. R. Narayanan (1997–2002)
	Atal Bihari Vajpayee (1924–2018) MP for Lucknow	73 years, 84 days	19 March 1998^{[§]}	22 May 2004	6 years, 64 days	1998	External Affairs (1998); Information and Broadcasting, Communications and Information Technology (1998); Non Conventional Energy Sources (1998–1999); Coal and Mines (2002); Environment and Forests (2003–2004)	Bharatiya Janata Party (National Democratic Alliance)	Vajpayee II	K. R. Narayanan (1997–2002)
	Atal Bihari Vajpayee (1924–2018) MP for Lucknow	73 years, 84 days	19 March 1998^{[§]}	22 May 2004	6 years, 64 days	1999	External Affairs (1998); Information and Broadcasting, Communications and Information Technology (1998); Non Conventional Energy Sources (1998–1999); Coal and Mines (2002); Environment and Forests (2003–2004)	Bharatiya Janata Party (National Democratic Alliance)	Vajpayee III	K. R. Narayanan (1997–2002)
	Atal Bihari Vajpayee (1924–2018) MP for Lucknow	73 years, 84 days	19 March 1998^{[§]}	22 May 2004	6 years, 64 days	1999	External Affairs (1998); Information and Broadcasting, Communications and Information Technology (1998); Non Conventional Energy Sources (1998–1999); Coal and Mines (2002); Environment and Forests (2003–2004)	Bharatiya Janata Party (National Democratic Alliance)	Vajpayee III	A. P. J. Abdul Kalam (2002–2007)
	Manmohan Singh (1932–2024) MP for Assam (Rajya Sabha)	71 years, 239 days	22 May 2004	26 May 2014	10 years, 4 days	2004	Personnel, Public Grievances and Pensions; Atomic Energy; Space; External Affairs (2005–2006); Finance (2008–2009, 2012); Culture (2009–2011)	Indian National Congress (United Progressive Alliance)	Manmohan I	A. P. J. Abdul Kalam (2002–2007)
	Manmohan Singh (1932–2024) MP for Assam (Rajya Sabha)	71 years, 239 days	22 May 2004	26 May 2014	10 years, 4 days	2004	Personnel, Public Grievances and Pensions; Atomic Energy; Space; External Affairs (2005–2006); Finance (2008–2009, 2012); Culture (2009–2011)	Indian National Congress (United Progressive Alliance)	Manmohan I	Pratibha Patil (2007–2012)
	Manmohan Singh (1932–2024) MP for Assam (Rajya Sabha)	71 years, 239 days	22 May 2004	26 May 2014	10 years, 4 days	2009	Personnel, Public Grievances and Pensions; Atomic Energy; Space; External Affairs (2005–2006); Finance (2008–2009, 2012); Culture (2009–2011)	Indian National Congress (United Progressive Alliance)	Manmohan II	Pratibha Patil (2007–2012)
	Manmohan Singh (1932–2024) MP for Assam (Rajya Sabha)	71 years, 239 days	22 May 2004	26 May 2014	10 years, 4 days	2009	Personnel, Public Grievances and Pensions; Atomic Energy; Space; External Affairs (2005–2006); Finance (2008–2009, 2012); Culture (2009–2011)	Indian National Congress (United Progressive Alliance)	Manmohan II	Pranab Mukherjee (2012–2017)
	Narendra Modi (born 1950) MP for Varanasi	63 years, 251 days	26 May 2014	Incumbent	12 years, 143 days	2014	Personnel, Public Grievances and Pensions; Atomic Energy; Space	Bharatiya Janata Party (National Democratic Alliance)	Modi I	Pranab Mukherjee (2012–2017)
	Narendra Modi (born 1950) MP for Varanasi	63 years, 251 days	26 May 2014	Incumbent	12 years, 143 days	2014	Personnel, Public Grievances and Pensions; Atomic Energy; Space	Bharatiya Janata Party (National Democratic Alliance)	Modi I	Ram Nath Kovind (2017–2022)
	Narendra Modi (born 1950) MP for Varanasi	63 years, 251 days	26 May 2014	Incumbent	12 years, 143 days	2019	Personnel, Public Grievances and Pensions; Atomic Energy; Space	Bharatiya Janata Party (National Democratic Alliance)	Modi II	Ram Nath Kovind (2017–2022)
	Narendra Modi (born 1950) MP for Varanasi	63 years, 251 days	26 May 2014	Incumbent	12 years, 143 days	2019	Personnel, Public Grievances and Pensions; Atomic Energy; Space	Bharatiya Janata Party (National Democratic Alliance)	Modi II	Droupadi Murmu (2022–present)
	Narendra Modi (born 1950) MP for Varanasi	63 years, 251 days	26 May 2014	Incumbent	12 years, 143 days	2024	Personnel, Public Grievances and Pensions; Atomic Energy; Space	Bharatiya Janata Party (National Democratic Alliance)	Modi III	Droupadi Murmu (2022–present)

=== Party affiliation ===
Party	PMs	Years in Office	Name(s)	Alliance
Indian National Congress	6	54 years	Jawaharlal Nehru, Lal Bahadur Shastri, Indira Gandhi, Rajiv Gandhi, P. V. Narasimha Rao and Manmohan Singh	DMK, CPI and CPI (M) (1969–1971); AIADMK (1991–1994); UPA (2004–2014)
Bharatiya Janata Party	2	17 years	Atal Bihari Vajpayee and Narendra Modi	NDA (from 1998)
Janata Dal	3	2 years	Vishwanath Pratap Singh, H. D. Deve Gowda and Inder Kumar Gujral	NF (1989–1990) UF (1996–1998)
Janata Party	1	2 years	Morarji Desai	JP
Janata Party (Secular)	1	<1 years	Charan Singh	JP
Samajwadi Janata Party (Rashtriya)	1	<1 years	Chandra Shekhar	JP External support from INC

== Constitutional framework and position of Prime Minister ==
The Constitution envisions a scheme of affairs in which the president of India is the head of state; in terms of Article 53 with office of the prime minister being the head of Council of Ministers to assist and advise the president in the discharge of their constitutional functions. To quote, Article 53, 74 and 75 provide as under:

The executive powers of the Union shall be vested in the president and shall be exercised either directly or through subordinate officers, in accordance with the Constitution.

— Article 53(1), Constitution of India

There shall be a Council of Ministers with the Prime Minister at the head to aid and advise the president who shall, in the exercise of his functions, act in accordance with such advice.

— Article 74(1), Constitution of India

The Prime Minister shall be appointed by the President and the other Ministers shall be appointed by the President on the advice of the Prime Minister.

— Article 75(1), Constitution of India

Like most parliamentary democracies, the president's duties are mostly ceremonial as long as the constitution and the rule of law is obeyed by the cabinet and the legislature. The prime minister of India is the head of government and has the responsibility for executive power. The president's constitutional duty is to preserve, protect and defend the Constitution and the law per article 60. In the constitution of India, the prime minister is mentioned in only four of its articles (articles 74, 75, 78 and 366). The prime minister plays a crucial role in the government of India by enjoying majority in the Lok Sabha.

== Appointment, tenure and removal ==
=== Eligibility ===
According to Article 84 of the Constitution of India, which sets the principle qualification for member of Parliament, and Article 75 of the Constitution of India, which sets the qualifications for the minister in the Union Council of Ministers, and the argument that the position of prime minister has been described as primus inter pares (the first among equals), A prime minister must:

- Be a citizen of India.
- Be a member of the Lok Sabha or the Rajya Sabha. If the person chosen as prime minister is neither a member of the Lok Sabha nor the Rajya Sabha at the time of selection, he must become a member of either of the houses within six months.
- Be at least 25 years of age if he is a member of the Lok Sabha, or, at least 30 years of age if he is a member of the Rajya Sabha.
- Not hold any office of profit under the government of India or the government of any state or under any local or other authority subject to the control of any of the said governments.

Once a candidate is elected as the prime minister, he must vacate his posts at any private or government companies and may take up the position only on completion of his term.

=== Oaths of office and secrecy ===
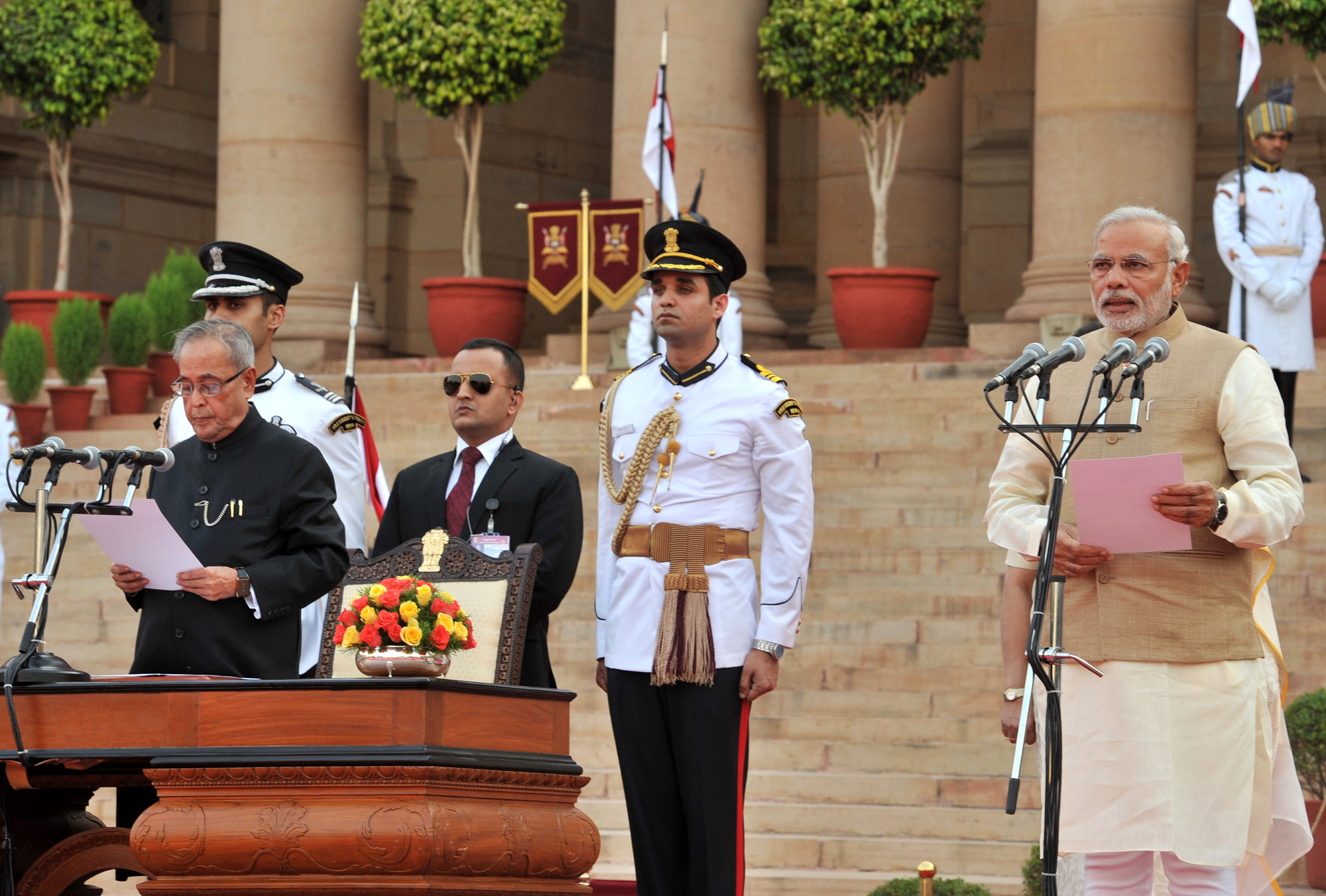
First swearing-in ceremony of Narendra Modi, 2014

The prime minister is required to make and subscribe in the presence of the president of India before entering office, the oath of office and secrecy, as per the Third Schedule of the Constitution of India.

Oath of office:

I, (name), do swear in the name of God/solemnly affirm that I will bear true faith and allegiance to the Constitution of India as by law established, that I will uphold the sovereignty and integrity of India, that I will faithfully and conscientiously discharge my duties as Prime Minister for the Union and that I will do right to all manner of people in accordance with the Constitution and the law, without fear or favour, affection or ill-will.

— Constitution of India, Third Schedule, Part I

Oath of secrecy:

I, (name), do swear in the name of God/solemnly affirm that I will not directly or indirectly communicate or reveal to any person or persons any matter which shall be brought under my consideration or shall become known to me as Prime Minister for the Union except as may be required for the due discharge of my duties as such Minister.

— Constitution of India, Third Schedule, Part II

=== Tenure and removal from office ===
The prime minister serves at 'the pleasure of the president', hence, a prime minister may remain in office indefinitely, so long as the president has confidence in them. However, a prime minister must maintain majority in the Lok Sabha, the lower house of the Parliament of India.

The term of a prime minister can end before the end of a Lok Sabha's term, if a simple majority of its members no longer have confidence in them, this is called a vote-of-no-confidence. Three prime ministers, I. K. Gujral, H. D. Deve Gowda and Atal Bihari Vajpayee have been voted out from office this way. In addition, a prime minister can resign from office; Morarji Desai was the first prime minister to resign while in office.

Upon ceasing to possess the requisite qualifications to be a member of Parliament subject to the Representation of the People Act, 1951.

== Role and power of the prime minister ==
=== Prime Minister Administrative Structure of India ===
Prime Minister Administrative Structure

Prime Minister of India; Narendra Modi
Prime Minister's Office; Principal Secretary: Pramod Kumar Mishra	Ministry of Personnel, Public Grievances and Pensions; Minister: Jitendra Singh	Cabinet Secretariat; Cabinet Secretary: T. V. Somanathan
Department of Atomic Energy; Secretary: Ajit Kumar Mohanty	Department of Space; Secretary & ISRO Chairman: Dr. V. Narayanan	Department of Personnel and Training; Secretary: Rachna Shah	Department of Administrative Reforms and Public Grievances; Secretary: V. Srinivas	Department of Pension and Pensioners’ Welfare; Secretary: V. Srinivas
Indian Space Research Organisation; Chairman: Dr. V. Narayanan	Antrix Corporation; Chairman: (under ISRO)	Research and Analysis Wing; Head: (Cabinet Secretary–level oversight)	Special Protection Group; Director: (Cabinet oversight)	Joint Intelligence Committee; Chairman: (Cabinet Secretariat)	National Authority, Chemical Weapons Convention; Secretary: (Cabinet Secretariat)

=== Executive powers ===
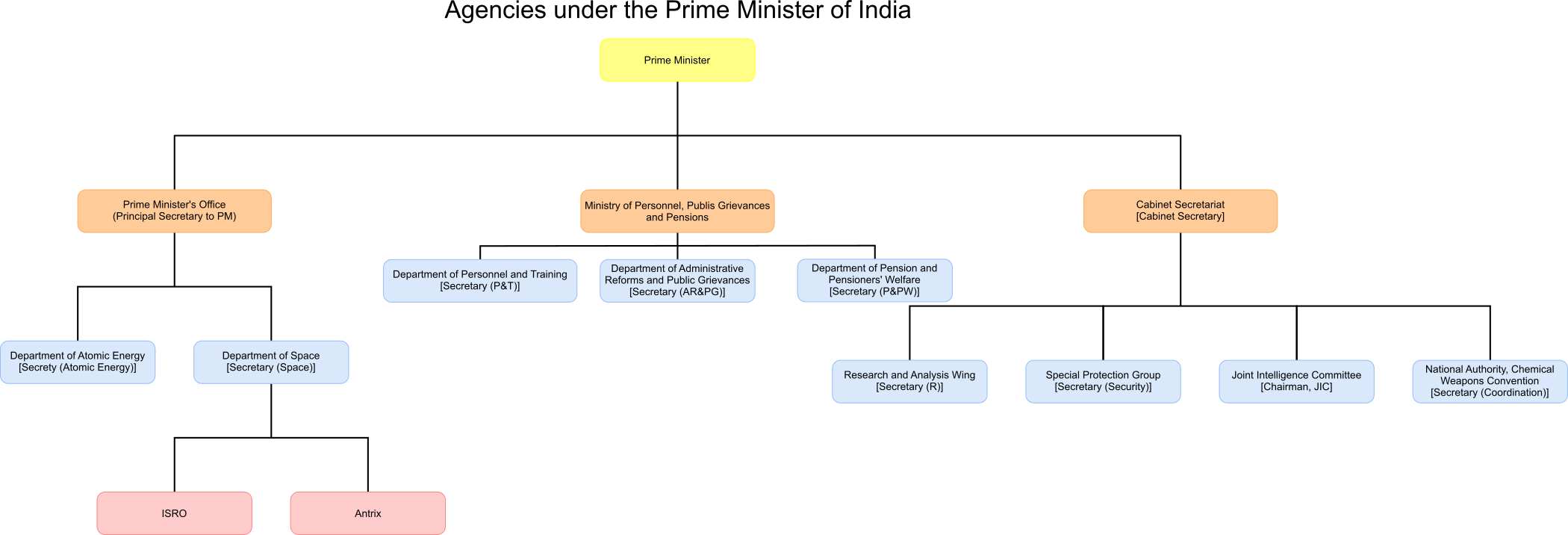
Agencies under the Prime Minister

The prime minister leads the functioning and exercise of authority of the government of India. The president of India, subject to eligibility, invites a person who is commanding support of majority members of Lok Sabha to form the government of India, also known as the central government or Union government, at the national level and exercise its powers. In practice the prime minister nominates the members of their council of ministers to the president. He also works upon to decide a core group of ministers (known as the cabinet), as in charge of the important functions and ministries of the government of India.

The prime minister is responsible for aiding and advising the president in distribution of work of the government to various ministries and offices and in terms of the Government of India (Allocation of Business) Rules, 1961. The co-ordinating work is generally allocated to the Cabinet Secretariat. While the work of the government is generally divided into various ministries, the prime minister may retain certain portfolios if he is not allocated to any member of the cabinet.

The prime minister, in consultation with the cabinet, schedules and attends the sessions of the houses of parliament and is required to answer questions from the Members of Parliament.

Some specific ministries/department are not allocated to anyone in the cabinet but the prime minister themself. The prime minister is usually always in charge/head of:

- Ministry of Personnel, Public Grievances and Pensions (as Minister of Personnel, Public Grievances and Pensions)
- Cabinet Secretariat
- Appointments Committee of the Cabinet
- Cabinet Committee on Security
- Cabinet Committee on Economic Affairs
- NITI Aayog (formerly Planning Commission)
- Department of Atomic Energy
- Department of Space
- Nuclear Command Authority

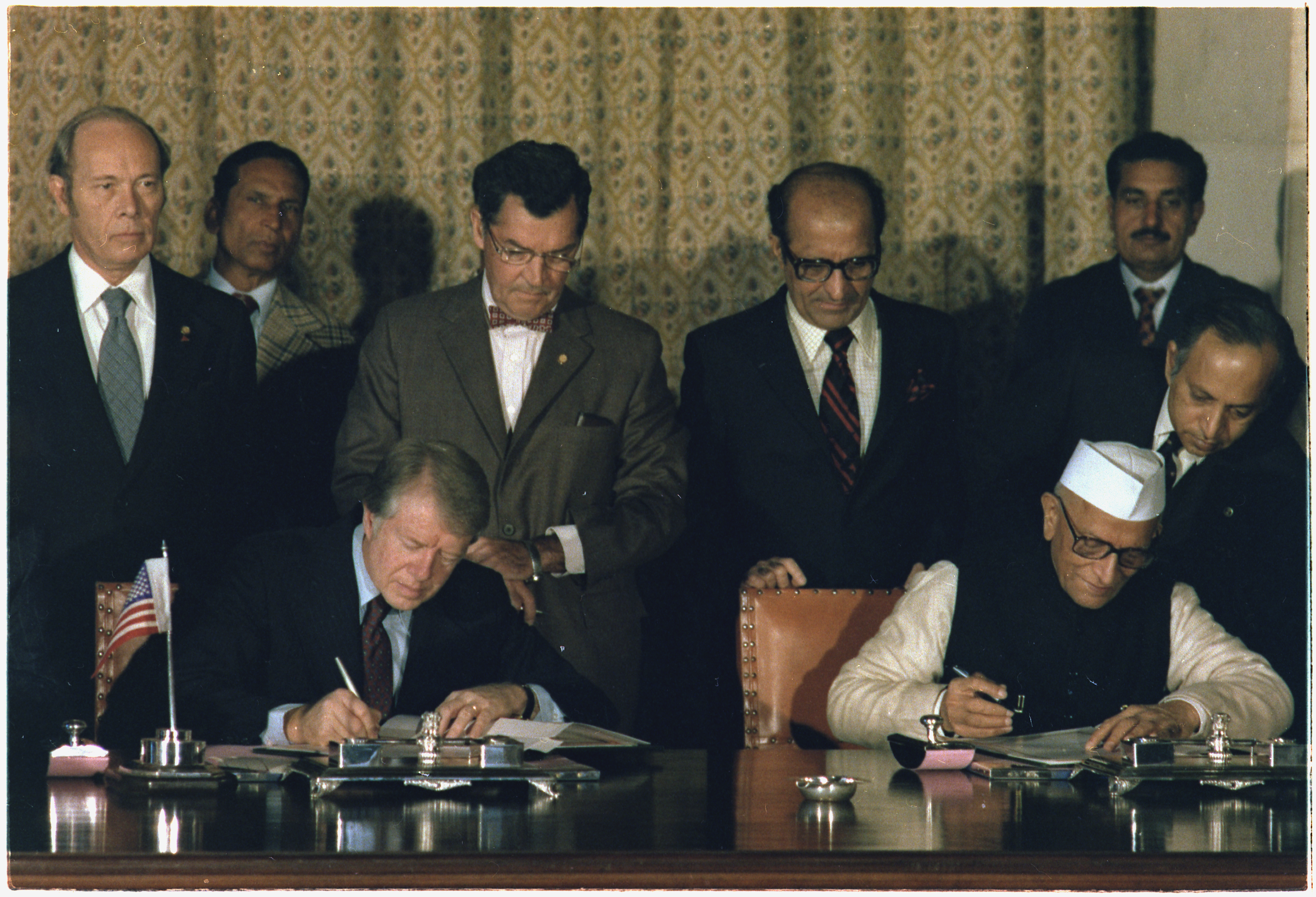
US President Jimmy Carter and PM Morarji Desai signing the New Delhi declaration, 3 January 1978

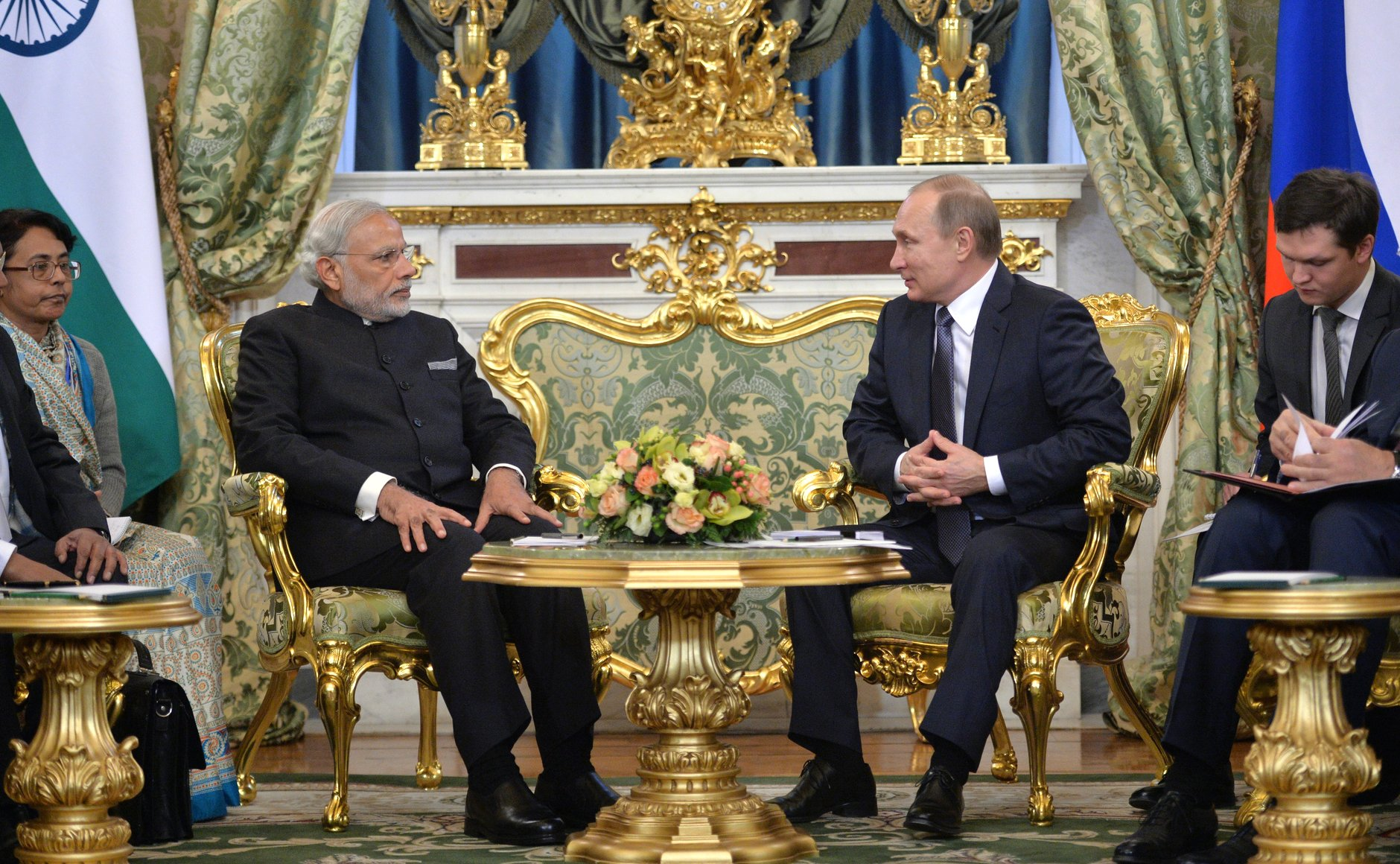
Russian president Vladimir Putin meeting prime minister Narendra Modi in the Kremlin, Moscow, 24 December 2015

The prime minister represents the country in various delegations, high level meetings and international organisations that require the attendance of the highest government office, and also addresses to the nation on various issues of national or other importance.

Per Article 78 of the Constitution of India, the union cabinet and the president officially communicate through the prime minister. Otherwise, the Constitution recognises the prime minister as a member of the union cabinet only outside the sphere of union cabinet.

==== Administrative and appointment powers ====
The prime minister recommends to the president, among others, names for the appointment of:

- Chief Election Commissioner of India (CEC) and other Election Commissioners of India (ECs)
- Comptroller and Auditor General of India (C&AG)
- Chairperson and members of the Union Public Service Commission (UPSC)
- Chief Information Commissioner of India (CIC) and Information Commissioners of India
- Chairperson and members of the finance commission (FC)
- Attorney General of India (AG) and Solicitor General of India (SG)

As the chairperson of Appointments Committee of the Cabinet (ACC), the prime minister, on the non-binding advice of the Cabinet Secretary of India led-Senior Selection Board (SSB), decides the postings of top civil servants, such as, secretaries, additional secretaries and joint secretaries in the government of India. Further, in the same capacity, the PM decides the assignments of top military personnel such as the Chief of the Army Staff, Chief of the Air Staff, Chief of the Naval Staff and commanders of operational and training commands. In addition, the ACC also decides the posting of Indian Police Service officers, the All India Service for policing, which staffs most of the higher level law enforcement positions at federal and state level, in the government of India.

Also, as the Minister of Personnel, Public Grievances and Pensions, the PM also exercises control over the Indian Administrative Service (IAS), the country's premier civil service, which staffs most of the senior civil service positions; the Public Enterprises Selection Board (PESB); and the Central Bureau of Investigation (CBI), except for the selection of its director, who is chosen by a committee of: (a) the prime minister, as chairperson; (b) the leader of the opposition in Lok Sabha; and (c) the chief justice.

Unlike most other countries, the prime minister does not have much influence over the selection of judges; that is done by a collegium of judges consisting of the chief justice of India, four senior most judges of the Supreme Court of India and the chief justice (or the senior-most judge) of the concerned state high court. The executive as a whole, however, has the right to send back a recommended name to the collegium for reconsideration; this, however, is not a full veto power, and the collegium can still put forward a rejected name.

=== Legislative powers ===
The prime minister acts as the leader of the house of the chamber of parliament that s/he belongs to, generally the Lok Sabha. In this role, the prime minister is tasked with representing the executive in the legislature, announces important legislation, and is further expected to respond to the opposition's concerns. Article 85 of the Indian constitution confers the president with the power to convene and end extraordinary sessions of the parliament; this power, however, is exercised only on the advice of the prime minister and their council; hence, in practice the prime minister does exercise some control over affairs of the parliament.

== Languages of the Prime Minister's Office ==
The official website of the Prime Minister's Office is available in 13 Indian languages namely Assamese, Bengali, Gujarati, Kannada, Malayalam, Manipuri, Marathi, Odia, Punjabi, Tamil, Telugu and Urdu out of the 22 official languages of the Indian Republic, in addition to English and Hindi.

The thirteen Indian language websites can be accessed at the following links:

1. Hindi: https://www.pmindia.gov.in/hi/
2. Assamese: http://www.pmindia.gov.in/asm/
3. Bengali: http://www.pmindia.gov.in/bn/
4. Gujarati: http://www.pmindia.gov.in/gu/
5. Kannada: http://www.pmindia.gov.in/kn/
6. Marathi: http://www.pmindia.gov.in/mr/
7. Malayalam: http://www.pmindia.gov.in/ml/
8. Manipuri: http://www.pmindia.gov.in/mni/
9. Odia: http://www.pmindia.gov.in/ory/
10. Punjabi: http://www.pmindia.gov.in/pa/
11. Tamil: http://www.pmindia.gov.in/ta/
12. Telugu: http://www.pmindia.gov.in/te/
13. Urdu: https://www.pmindia.gov.in/ur/

== Compensation and benefits ==
Article 75 of the Constitution of India confers the Parliament with the power to decide the remuneration and other benefits of the prime minister and other ministers are to be decided by the Parliament. and is renewed from time to time. The original remunerations for the prime minister and other ministers were specified in the Part B of the second schedule of the constitution, which was later removed by an amendment.

In 2010, the Prime Minister's Office reported that the prime minister does not receive a formal salary; only monthly allowances. That same year The Economist reported that, on a purchasing power parity basis, the prime minister received an equivalent of $4106 per year. As a percentage of the country's per-capita GDP (gross domestic product), this is the lowest of all countries The Economist surveyed.

Prime-ministerial pay and allowances
As on	Gross amount in INR (₹)	Gross amount in USD ($)
October 2009	₹100,000	$1,400
October 2010	₹135,000	$1,900
July 2012	₹160,000	$2,200

=== Residence ===
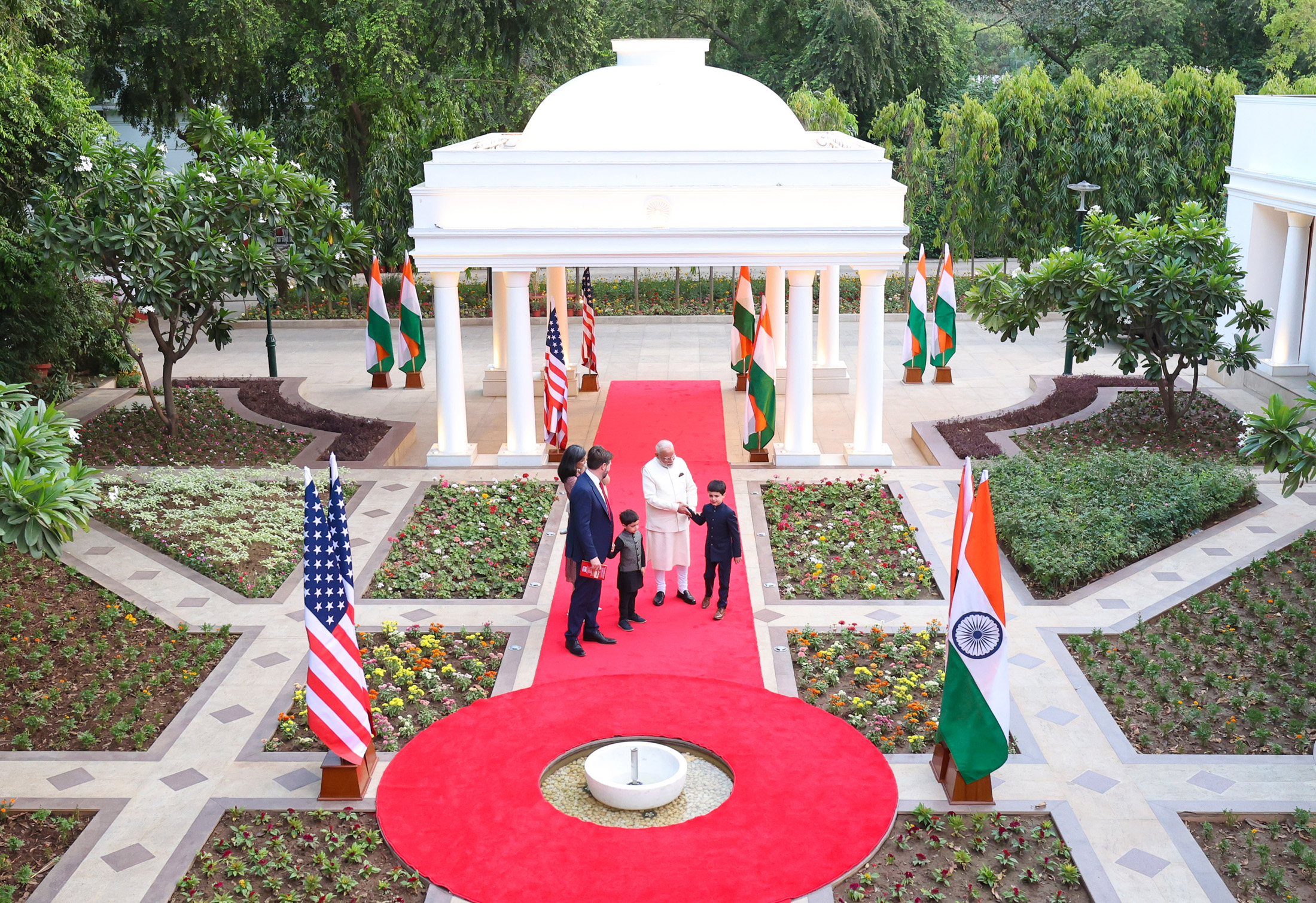
PM Modi welcomes JD Vance, 50th Vice President of the United States, and his family to 7, Race Course Road (2025)

The 7, Race Course Road, officially called 7, Lok Kalyan Marg, in New Delhi, currently serves as the official place of residence for the prime minister of India.

The residence during the tenure of the first prime minister, Jawaharlal Nehru, was Teen Murti Bhavan. Lal Bahadur Shastri chose 10, Janpath as an official residence. Indira Gandhi resided at 1, Safdarjung Road. Rajiv Gandhi became the first prime minister to use 7, Race Course Road as his residence, which was used by his successors.

=== Travel ===
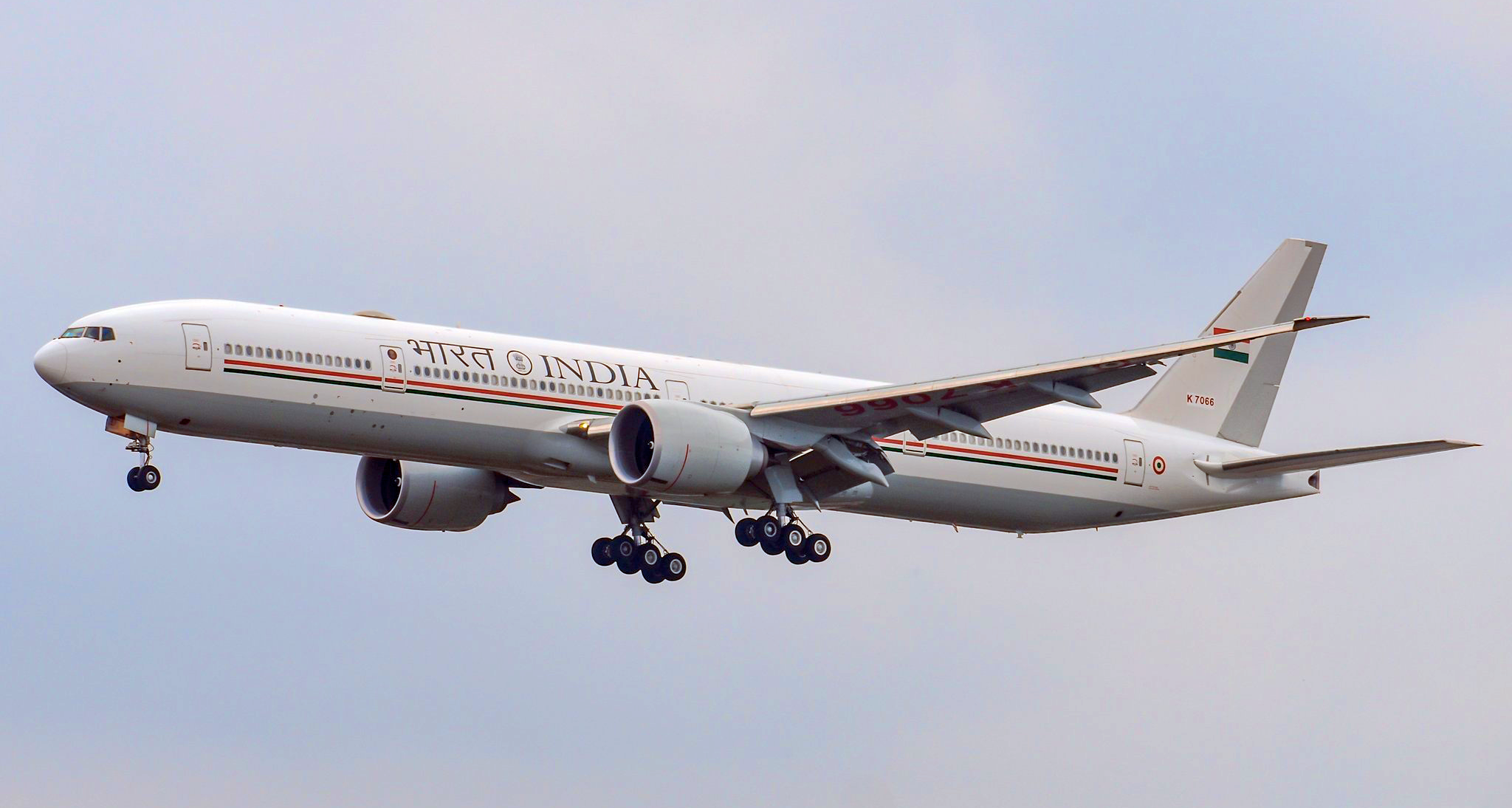
Air India One Boeing 777-300ER (K7066)

For ground travel, the prime minister uses a highly modified, armoured version of a Range Rover. The prime minister's motorcade comprises a fleet of vehicles, the core of which consists of at least three armoured BMW 7 Series sedans, two armoured Range Rovers, at least 8–10 BMW X5s, six Toyota Fortuners/Land Cruisers, and at least two Mercedes-Benz Sprinter ambulances.

For air travel, Boeing 777-300ERs designated by the call sign Air India One (AI-1 or AIC001) and maintained by the Indian Air Force are used. There are several helicopters, such as Mi-8, used for carrying the prime minister over short distances. These aircraft are operated by the Indian Air Force.

=== Protection ===
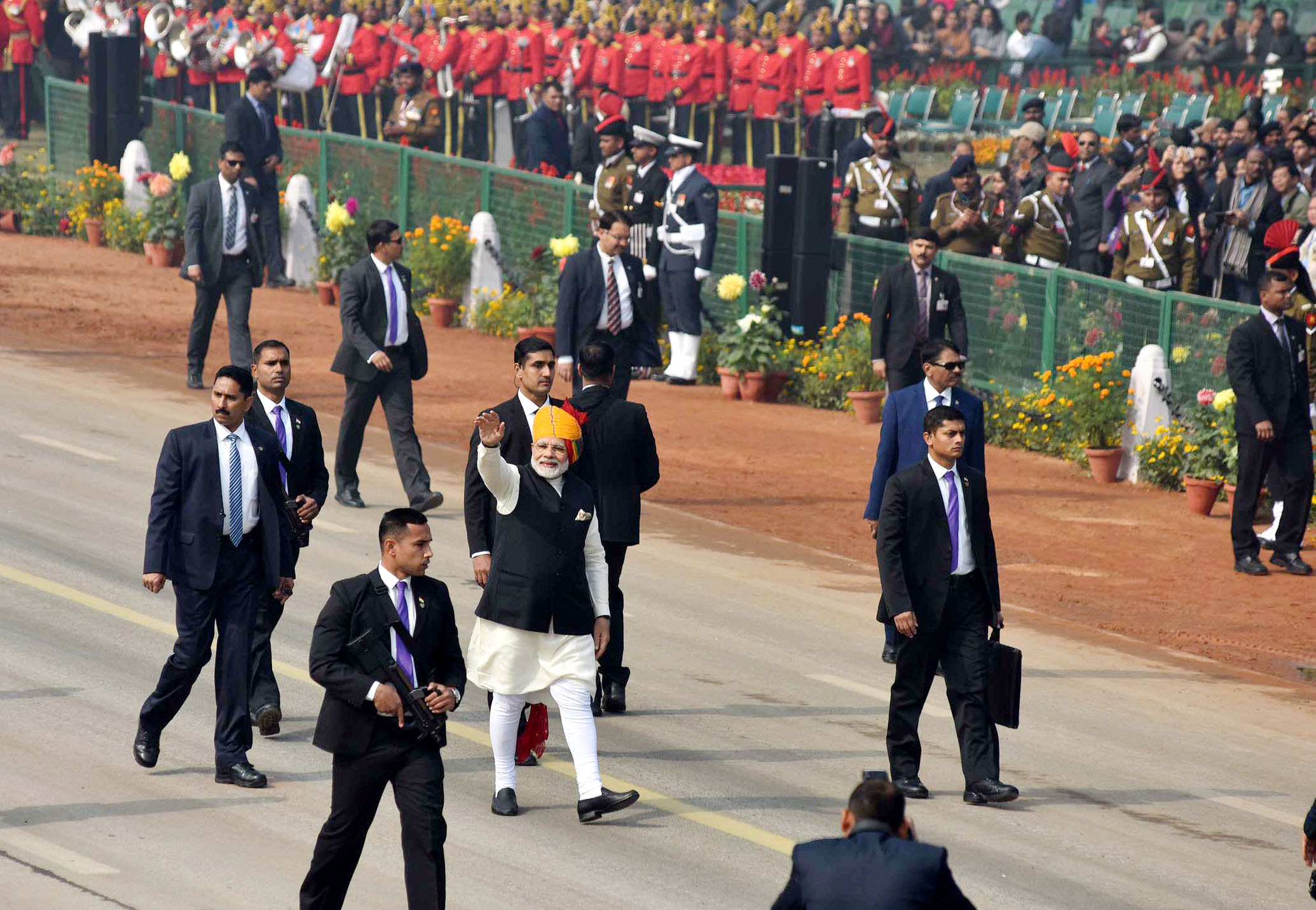
Armed SPG agents accompanying prime minister Narendra Modi on the Rajpath on the occasion of 69th republic day, 2018

The Special Protection Group (SPG) is charged with protecting the sitting prime minister and their family. The security is aided by the Central Reserve Police Force (CRPF), Border Security Force (BSF) and the Delhi Police to provide three-rung security for the estate.

=== Office ===
The Prime Minister's Office (PMO) acts as the principal workplace of the prime minister. The office is located at South Block, and is a 20-room complex, and has the Cabinet Secretariat, the Ministry of Defence and the Ministry of External Affairs adjacent to it. The office is headed by the principal secretary to the prime minister of India, generally a former civil servant, mostly from the Indian Administrative Service (IAS) and rarely from the Indian Foreign Service (IFS).

== Family ==
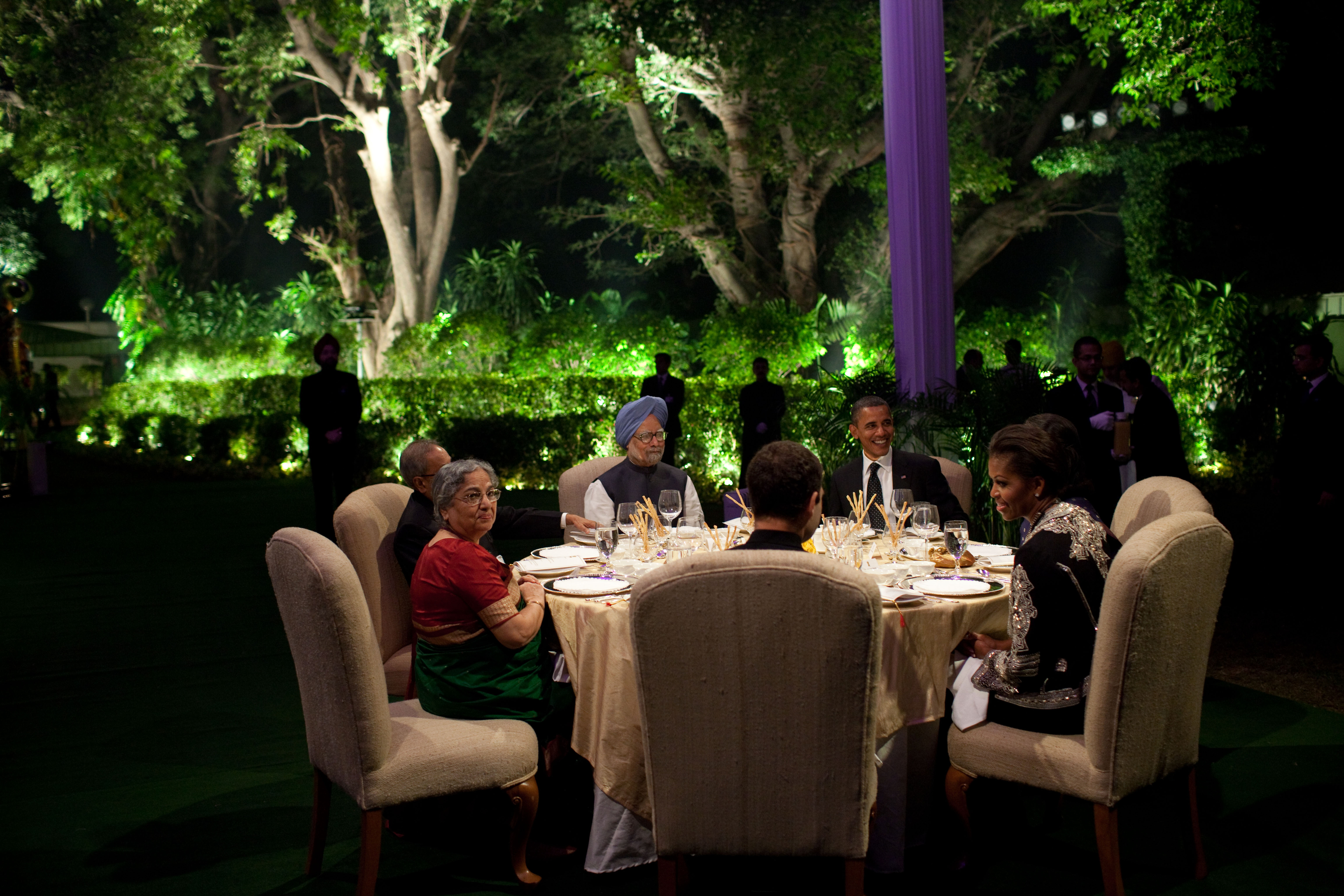
Manmohan Singh and Gursharan Kaur, hosting Barack Obama and Michelle Obama at their residence on 7 November 2010. Seated at the table are Rahul Gandhi to the left of Mrs. Obama and unseen to her right, Sonia Gandhi, both from the family of former prime minister Rajiv Gandhi.

The prime minister's spouse sometimes accompanies them on foreign visits. The prime minister's family is also assigned protection by the Special Protection Group, though it was removed after Special Protection Group Act in 2019. The most prominent of the family of prime ministers is the Nehru–Gandhi family, which has had three prime ministers, Jawaharlal Nehru, Indira Gandhi and Rajiv Gandhi. Many family members of former prime ministers are politicians.

== Post-premiership ==
Former prime ministers are entitled to a bungalow, and are also entitled the same facilities as those given to a serving cabinet minister, including a fourteen-member secretarial staff, for a period of five years; reimbursement of office expenses; six domestic executive-class air tickets each year; and security cover from the armed forces and police as established by law.

In addition, former prime ministers rank seventh on the Indian order of precedence, equivalent to chief ministers of states (within their respective states) and cabinet ministers. As a former member of the parliament, the prime minister also receives a pension after he leaves office. In 2015, a former MP receives a minimum pension of ₹20,000 (US$210) per month, plus, if he/she served as an MP for more than five years, ₹1,500 (US$16) for every year served.

Some prime ministers have had significant careers after their tenure, including H. D. Deve Gowda, who continues to be a member of Parliament.

=== Death ===
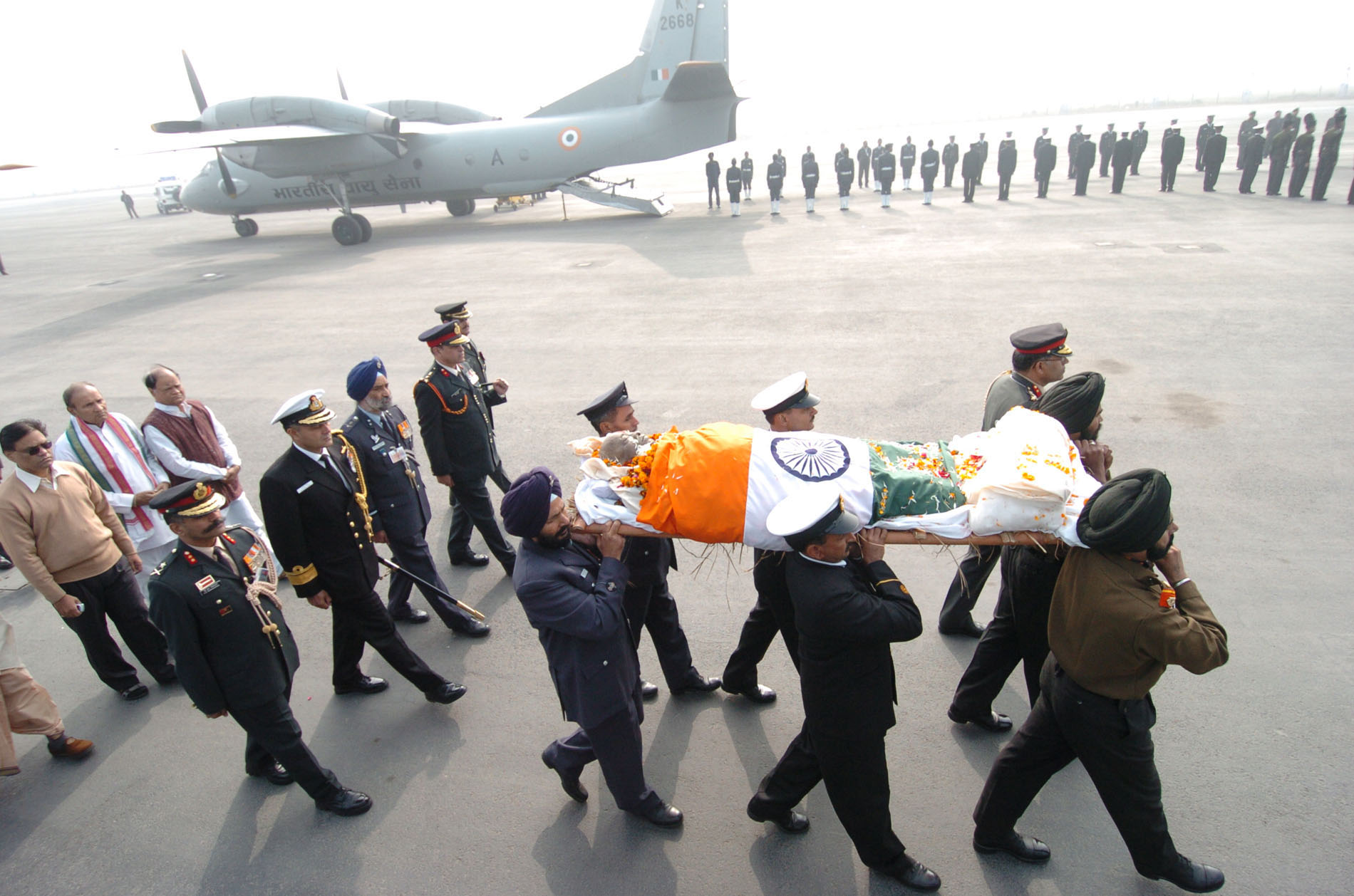
The body of late prime minister P. V. Narasimha Rao, draped in the flag of the Republic of India, being carried by personnel of the Army, Navy, and Air Force, at Palam Airport, Delhi, en route to Hyderabad for cremation, 24 December 2004.

Prime ministers are accorded a state funeral. It is customary for states and union territories to declare a day of mourning on the occasion of death of any former prime minister.

=== Commemoration ===
Several institutions are named after prime ministers of India. The birth date of Jawaharlal Nehru is celebrated as children's day while the birth date of Charan Singh is celebrated as farmer's day in India. Prime ministers are also commemorated on the postage stamps of several countries.

== Prime ministerial funds ==
The prime minister presides over various funds.

=== National Defence Fund ===
The National Defence Fund (NDF) was set up the Indian government in 1962, in the aftermath of 1962 Sino-Indian War. The prime minister acts as chairperson of the fund's executive committee, while, the ministers of defence, finance and home act as the members of the executive committee, the finance minister also acts the treasurer of the committee. The secretary of the fund's executive committee is a joint secretary in the Prime Minister's Office, dealing with the subject of NDF. The fund, according to its website, is "entirely dependent on voluntary contributions from the public and does not get any budgetary support.". Donations to the fund are 100% tax-deductible under section 80G of the Income Tax Act, 1961.

=== Prime Minister's National Relief Fund ===
The Prime Minister's National Relief Fund (PMNRF) was set up by the first prime minister of India, Jawaharlal Nehru, in 1948, to assist displaced people from Pakistan. The fund, now, is primarily used to assist the families of those who are killed during natural disasters such as earthquakes, cyclones and flood and secondarily to reimburse medical expenses of people with chronic and deadly diseases. Donations to the PMNRF are 100% tax-deductible under section 80G of the Income Tax Act, 1961.

=== Prime Minister's Citizen Assistance and Relief in Emergency Situations Fund (PM Cares Fund) ===
In March 2020, after the rapid spread of the COVID-19 virus from Wuhan to countries across the world, Prime Minister Narendra Modi announced the formation of a special fund to deal with any kind of emergency or distress situations like the COVID-19 pandemic. The fund being fully voluntary without any government budgetary support, PM Modi appealed to the public to donate generously towards the fund. Following this donors from all sections of the society donated whole heartedly. Initially in FY 2019–20 the fund received Rs 3076.62 crores in just 5 days of its announcement. Initially the fund was used to procure COVID emergency products like ventilators, PPE kits for frontline workers and also funding the vaccine resaearch efforts and procurement. By FY 2020–21 the corpus of the PM Cares Fund was around Rs 10990 crore.

== Deputy Prime Minister ==
The post of deputy prime minister of India is not technically a constitutional post, nor is there any mention of it in an Act of Parliament. But historically, on various occasions, different governments have assigned one of their senior ministers as the deputy prime minister. There is neither constitutional requirement for filling the post of deputy PM, nor does the post provide any kind of special powers. Typically, senior cabinet ministers like the finance minister or the home minister are appointed as deputy prime minister. The post is considered to be the senior most in the cabinet after the prime minister and represents the government in their absence. Typically, deputy prime ministers have been appointed to strengthen the coalition governments.

== Oath of office ==
The oath of office for Prime Minister of India as follows:

I, (name), do swear in the name of God (or, solemnly affirm) that I will bear true faith and allegiance to the Constitution of India as by law established, that I will uphold the sovereignty and integrity of India, that I will faithfully and conscientiously discharge my duties as a Prime Minister for the Union and that I will do right to all manner of people in accordance with the Constitution and the law, without fear or favour, affection or ill-will.

— Schedule III, Constitution of India

oath of office of Prime Minister of India and Union Council of Ministers In Hindi Version

'मैं, (अमुक), ईश्वर की शपथ लेता हूँ (सत्यनिष्ठा से प्रतिज्ञान करता हूँ) कि मैं विधि द्वारा स्थापित भारत के संविधान के प्रति सच्ची श्रद्धा और निष्ठा रखूँगा, मैं भारत की प्रभुता और अखंडता अक्षुण्ण रखूँगा, मैं संघ के प्रधानमंत्री के रूप में अपने कर्तव्यों का श्रद्धापूर्वक और शुद्ध अंतःकरण से निर्वहन करूँगा तथा मैं भय या पक्षपात, अनुराग या द्वेष के बिना, सभी प्रकार के लोगों के प्रति संविधान और विधि के अनुसार न्याय करूँगा।'

— तीसरी अनुसूची, भारत का संविधान

The oath of secrecy is as follows:

I, (name), do swear in the name of God (or, solemnly affirm) that I will not directly or indirectly communicate or reveal to any person or persons any matter which shall be brought under my consideration, or shall become known to me as a Prime Minister for the Union, except as may be required for the due discharge of my duties as Prime Minister.

— Schedule III, Constitution of India

Oath of Secrecy in Hindi Version

'मैं, (अमुक), ईश्वर की शपथ लेता हूँ (सत्यनिष्ठा से प्रतिज्ञान करता हूँ) कि जो विषय संघ के प्रधानमंत्री (या, मंत्री) के रूप में मेरे विचार के लिए लाया जाएगा अथवा मुझे ज्ञात होगा उसे किसी व्यक्ति या व्यक्तियों को, तब के सिवाय जबकि प्रधानमंत्री (या, ऐसे मंत्री) के रूप में अपने कर्तव्यों के सम्यक्‌ निर्वहन के लिए ऐसा करना अपेक्षित हो, मैं प्रत्यक्ष अथवा अप्रत्यक्ष रूप से संसूचित या प्रकट नहीं करूँगा।'

— तीसरी अनुसूची, भारत का संविधान

== See also ==
- Nehru–Gandhi family
- Union Council of Ministers
- List of prime ministers of India
- List of presidents of India
- President of India
- Vice President of India
- List of vice presidents of India
- Deputy Prime Minister of India
- Air transports of heads of state and government
- Official state car
