= First oath of office ceremony of Narendra Modi =

2014 Indian political ceremony

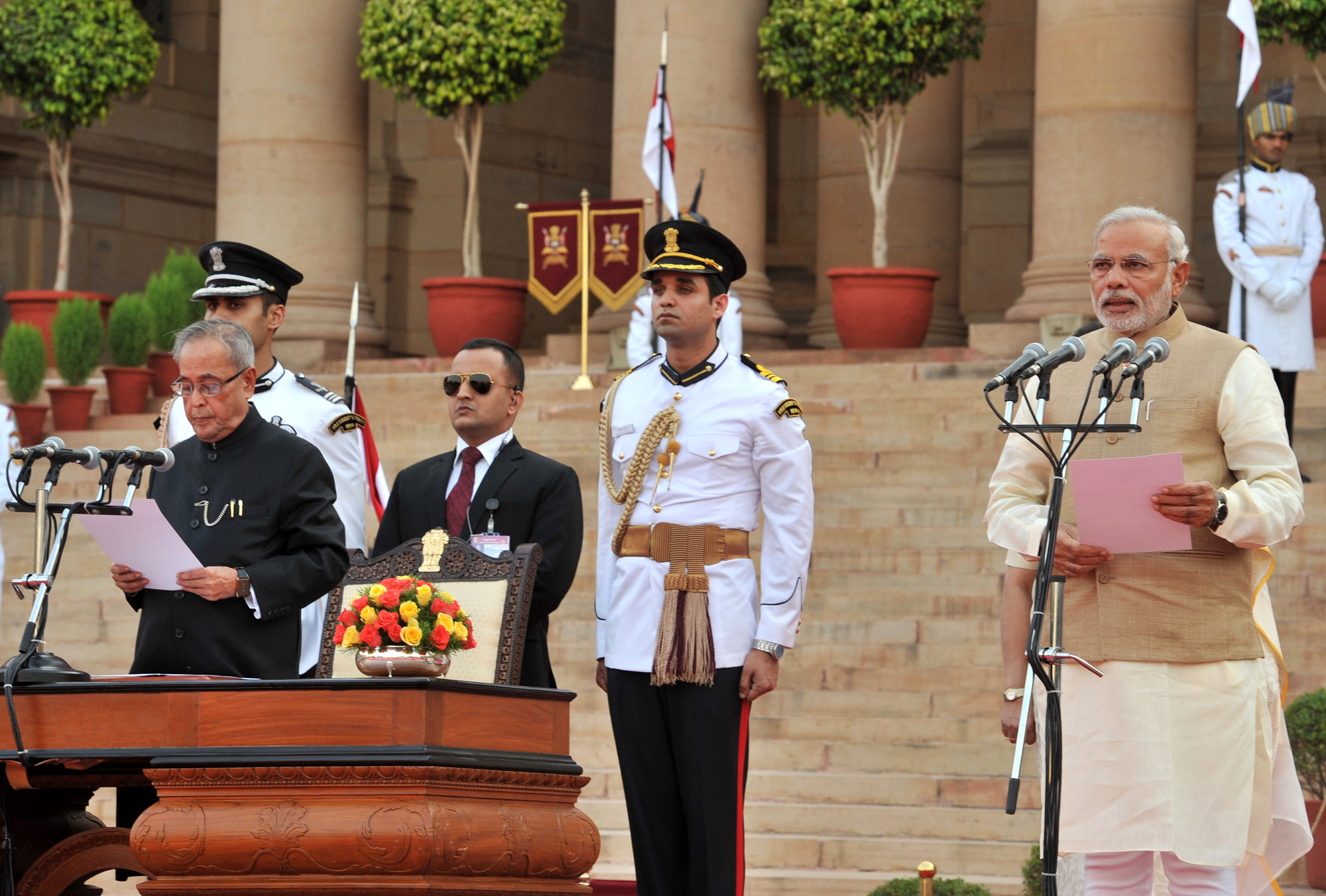
- Narendra Modi takes the oath of office as the Prime Minister of India, with President Pranab Mukherjee administering the oath.
- Date: 26 May 2014; 12 years ago
- Location: Rashtrapati Bhavan, New Delhi, India 28.6143°N 77.199°E
- Participants: Prime Minister of India, Narendra Modi; First Modi ministry Assuming office President of India, Pranab Mukherjee Administering oath

Oath of office

I, (name), do swear in the name of God (or, solemnly affirm) that I will bear true faith and allegiance to the Constitution of India as by law established, that I will uphold the sovereignty and integrity of India, that I will faithfully and conscientiously discharge my duties as a Prime Minister for the Union and that I will do right to all manner of people in accordance with the Constitution and the law, without fear or favour, affection or ill-will.

— Constitution of India, Third Schedule, Part I
Oath of secrecy

I, (name), do swear in the name of God (or, solemnly affirm) that I will not directly or indirectly communicate or reveal to any person or persons any matter which shall be brought under my consideration, or shall become known to me as a Prime Minister for the Union, except as may be required for the due discharge of my duties as Prime Minister.

— Constitution of India, Third Schedule, Part II

Narendra Modi, parliamentary leader of the Bharatiya Janata Party, started the first tenure of his prime ministership, after his oath of office as the 14th Prime Minister of India on 26 May 2014. 45 other ministers were also sworn in along with Modi. The ceremony was noted by media for being the first ever oath of office of an Indian Prime Minister to have been attended by the heads of all SAARC countries.

== Background ==
Post the declaration of election results on 16 May 2014, Modi met the President of India Pranab Mukherjee on 20 May where Mukherjee invited Modi to form the next government. The BJP had won 282 seats and their alliance National Democratic Alliance won a total of 336 seats in the 543-seat Lok Sabha, the strongest mandate since the 1984 elections where Indian National Congress had won. The BJP then announced that Modi would be sworn in on 26 May 2014 at 18:00 IST Modi's actual oath was made at 18:13 IST.

== Ceremony ==
The oath of office ceremony was held at the forecourts of the Rashtrapati Bhavan in Delhi which has been used as the venue of oath of office by only two previous Prime Ministers, Chandra Shekhar (1990, Samajwadi Janata Party) and Atal Bihari Vajpayee (1998 and 1999, BJP). The Durbar Hall was another possible venue but was rejected for its small sitting capacity of 500. BJP indicated that the ceremony would be held in open ground. Before, Modi has taken his oath as Chief Minister of Gujarat in open stadiums. Extra trains were scheduled from Varanasi and Gujarat on the previous day for viewers to reach Delhi. India's national broadcaster Doordarshan had various innovative ways planned. The ceremony's broadcast had an anchor in inset narrating the event in sign-language. This had previously been used in the Republic Day parade broadcast, but was the first time for an oath of office. In another first, the 15 regional television channels of Doordarshan aired the ceremony in the respective regional languages. The event was also the first of its kind to ever be streamed live on YouTube. The ceremony cost the President's Estate ₹34 lakh.

== Invitees ==
The guest-list includes various heads of the states, political parties and groups along with leaders of SAARC countries. The event is hence viewed as a "major diplomatic event".

SAARC on world map

=== International dignitaries ===
All SAARC heads of government attended. The ceremony was the first oath of office of an Indian Prime Minister where all SAARC heads were invited. After the ceremony, Modi described this new government's first major initiative in foreign policy as the "right decision at the right time".

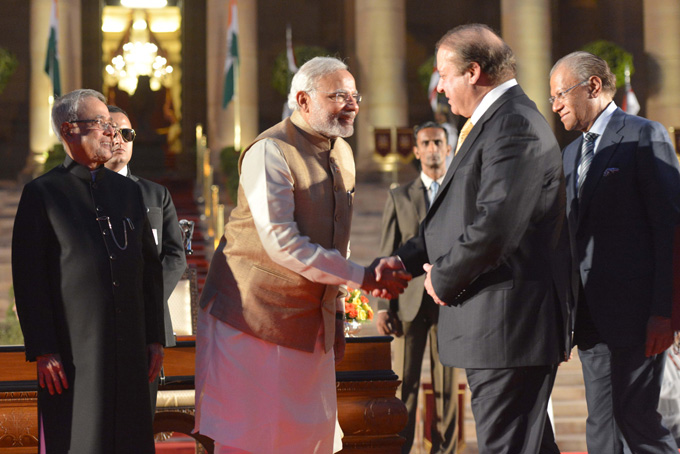
(L-R) President Pranab Mukherjee, Prime Minister Narendra Modi, Prime Minister of Pakistan, Nawaz Sharif and Prime Minister of Mauritius, Navin Ramgoolam.

- Islamic Republic of Afghanistan – President Hamid Karzai accepted the invitation to attend the ceremony. He is bound to leave the office post the ongoing presidential elections. But his acceptance was seen as Afghanistan's interest in working with India in future. Media also noted that his either successors Abdullah Abdullah and Ashraf Ghani are pro-India.
- Bangladesh - Shirin Sharmin Chaudhury, the speaker of the Jātīya Sangsað, (the House of the Nation) accepted the invitation on behalf of the Prime Minister Sheikh Hasina as Hasina had a pre-planned visit to Japan.
- Bhutan - Prime Minister Tshering Tobgay attended the ceremony and planned to have a discussion on bilateral relations of the two countries on 27 May.
- Maldives - Maldivian President Abdulla Yameen attended the ceremony.
- Mauritius - Mauritius Prime Minister Navin Ramgoolam attended the ceremony.
- Nepal - Nepal Prime Minister Sushil Koirala accepted the invitation.
- Pakistan - Indian politicians reacted strongly after Nawaz Sharif accepted the invitation to the oath of office ceremony on May 24. National Conference's (NC) Omar Abdullah was glad that the Pakistani Prime Minister had accepted the invitation to Modi's oath of office. He said that this would mark a new beginning in Indo-Pakistani ties. Key National Democratic Alliance (NDA) ally Shiv Sena, which has been vocal against Pakistan for sponsoring terrorism in India, came out opposing the invitation to the Pakistan Prime Minister. Pakistani journalists and politicians however had mixed views on Sharif accepting the invitation.
- Sri Lanka - President Mahinda Rajapaksa's invitation and attendance to the ceremony came under heavy criticism amongst Tamil Nadu politicians. The All India Anna Dravida Munnetra Kazhagam (AIADMK) and NDA ally Marumalarchi Dravida Munnetra Kazhagam (MDMK) leaders had spoken against the Modi government's decision to invite the Sri Lankan president. MDMK chief Vaiko met Modi to try to change his mind about the invitation while the Congress leaders were one with the MDMK and the AIADMK opposing the invitation. Amid strong opposition from all quarters, CPI(M) on Sunday said the centre should utilise this occasion for resolving the Lankan Tamils issue. A Tamil students group called Delhi Tamil Youth Forum staged a protest in the streets of Delhi on Sunday to register their anger. Due to Modi's goodwill and peaceful approach, Indian fishermen were released by Pakistan and Sri Lanka. Pakistan released 151 fishermen on 25 May from the Malir jail in Karachi and Nara jail in Hyderabad in Sindh province. Modi welcomed this move of both the nations.
- Tibet - The prime minister of the Tibetan Government-in-Exile, Lobsang Sangay, attended the ceremony. The Chinese government opposed the invitation to the Tibetan leader.

=== National dignitaries ===
Outgoing Prime Minister Manmohan Singh, former Presidents A. P. J. Abdul Kalam and Pratibha Patil, Vice President Hamid Ansari, Congress president Sonia Gandhi were among those who participated. Chief Ministers of all states in India were invited to attend the event. Among them, the Chief Minister of Karnataka, Siddaramaiah (INC) and Chief Minister of Kerala, Oommen Chandy (INC) could not attend the ceremony due to their prior engagements though they gave their best wishes. The Chief Minister of Tamil Nadu, J. Jayalalithaa (AIADMK), whose party had won the third highest number of seats in the election also declined to attend the event, while the Chief Minister of West Bengal, Mamatā Banerjee (AITC), decided to send Mukul Roy and Amit Mitra to attend. Chief Minister of Madhya Pradesh, Shivraj Singh Chouhan of the BJP and his entire cabinet had hired an aircraft to attend the ceremony and return to Bhopal the same night.

Celebrities who were invited to the event included Salman Khan, Dharmendra, Anupam Kher, Madhur Bhandarkar, Suresh Gopi, Vivek Oberoi, Lata Mangeshkar, Rajinikanth and Amitabh Bachchan.

Ravi Raushan want to make it a special day for the people." Diwali like celebrations were done in Shimla to mark the "end of ten years of Congress rule". Similar celebrations have been planned in Gujarat, the home state of Modi. The Southern Gujarat Hotel and Restaurant Association (SHRA) announced a list of 48 restaurants and fast food joints across Surat that will serve free tea to people between 6-9 PM IST. Vadodara, Modi's constituency called it a "Vadodara Pride Day". Along with similar celebrations, educational stationary was also distributed in Vadodara to the school children. Religious worships were planned in the temples, mosques and gurudwaras of Indore, Madhya Pradesh. 5,000 laddus were ordered to be distributed by the Mysore Zila Ganigara Sangha community in Mysore, Karnataka.

Celebrations were also carried out in the Times Square of New York City and other cities of the United States by organizing "election watch parties". An Indian restaurant in New Jersey also promised free methi pakodas if Modi won the elections. Similar festivities were also seen amongst the Indians settled in Australia and Canada.

== See also ==
- Premiership of Narendra Modi
