= Arun Kumar Sinha (police officer) =

Indian Police Service officer (1963–2023)

Director of the Special Protection Group (SPG)
- In office March 2016 – September 2023
- Preceded by: Vivek Srivastava
- Succeeded by: Alok Sharma

Personal details
- Born: 9 May 1963 Hazaribagh, Jharkhand
- Died: 6 September 2023 (aged 60)

Military service
- Allegiance: India
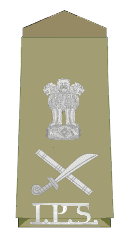
- Rank: Director General of Police

Arun Kumar Sinha (1963–2023) was an Indian Police Service (IPS) officer of the Kerala cadre (1987 batch), known for his service as the Director of the Special Protection Group (SPG) India.

== Education ==
He was born on 9 May 1963 in Hazaribagh, Jharkhand. He studied at St Columba's College Hazaribagh where he got Bachelor of Science in Zoology in 1984. He did his preparation for Civil Services Examination in Delhi and got into IPS on his second attempt.

== Career ==
Sinha was a 1987 batch IPS officer. He started his career in the Kerala cadre as assistant superintendent of police at Mananthavady in Wayanad. Then he was posted as the Commissioner of Police in Thiruvananthapuram and Kochi.

He is known for modernizing the Kerala Police, and his work to enhance law enforcement and effectiveness in the state. Before becoming the SPG Director, Sinha served with the Border Security Force, contributing to safeguarding India's borders. In 2016, he assumed the role of Director of the Special Protection Group (SPG), where he was responsible for the security of the Prime Minister of India and former Prime Ministers.

From June 2009 to June 2014, Mr. Sinha served a five-year Central deputation with the Border Security Force (BSF), holding the position of Inspector General (IG) for the Gujarat Frontier. During his tenure, he worked on border security along an 860-kilometer stretch, which included the Barmer region of Rajasthan. His is known for deterrence of illegal activities carried out by counterparts, armed non-state entities (ANEs), and smugglers in the region.

As Director SPG he introduced training programmes to strengthen the acumen of SPG officers to provide fail proof security cover to all its Protectees.

On 30 May 2023 just one day before retirement, he was given an extension for 1 year in the same post.

Sinha is known for launching Kerala Police's first website, a pioneering step in police digitalization. This model was subsequently adopted by other Indian states.

== Awards ==
During his 36-year service, Sinha received several awards, including the President's Medal for Meritorious Service in 2003 and the President's Medal for Distinguished Service in 2011.

== Death ==
He was experiencing health issues related to pancreatic cancer and was admitted to Medanta hospital in Gurugram for treatment where he died on 6 September 2023. At the time of his death, he was the longest serving Director SPG.
