= Special Protection Group (Amendment) Act, 2019 =

Act of Indian Parliament

Parliament of India
- Long title: An Act further to amend the Special Protection Group Act, 1988.
- Citation: Act No. 43 of 2019
- Considered by: Parliament of India
- Enacted by: Lok Sabha
- Enacted: 27 November 2019
- Enacted by: Rajya Sabha
- Enacted: 3 December 2019
- Assented to: 9 December 2019
- Signed by: Ram Nath Kovind; President of India
- Signed: 9 December 2019

Legislative history

Initiating chamber: Lok Sabha
- Bill citation: Bill No. CCCLXV of 2019
- Introduced by: G. Kishan Reddy; Minister of State for Home Affairs(in Lok Sabha); Amit Shah; Minister of Home Affairs(in Rajya Sabha)
- Introduced: 27 November 2019
- First reading: 27 November 2019
- Second reading: 3 December 2019
- Status: In force

The Special Protection Group (Amendment) Act, 2019 is an act passed by Indian parliament in 2019 which reduces Special Protection Group cover to only Prime Minister, former Prime Ministers and their immediate family members up to 5 years after ceasing post if they are residing at the residence allotted. The bill amends Special Protection Group Act 1988 which was in application.

== Enactment ==
Bill was introduced in the Lok Sabha, lower house of parliament, on 25 November 2019 by minister of state for home affairs--G. Kishan Reddy. It was passed in Lok Sabha on 27 November 2019. On 3 December 2019, bill was introduced to Rajya Sabha by Home minister Amit Shah and was subsequently passed on the same day.

It was assented by the President on 9 December 2019 and became an act.

== Reaction ==
=== Lok Sabha ===
While introducing the bill in Lok Sabha, Reddy said that there was no cut off period in existing act for providing SPG protection to former prime ministers and members of their immediate families.

Adhir Ranjan Chowdhury, leader of opposition in Lok Sabha, called the bill and move to amend the Special Protection Group Act 1988 as 'Political Vendetta' and alleged that government was trying to target the family which lost two lives for nation. RJD leader Manoj Jha and CPI leader Binoy Viswam also supported the claim.

Amit Shah, Home minister of India, alleged that previous amendments in Special Protection Group Act 1988 were attempts to ensure continued protection for a family. In addition, he alleged that amendments to the act were effected in 1991, 1994, 1999 and 2003 and one more amendment was being brought to revert the original spirit of the act.

=== Rajya Sabha ===
B. K. Hariprasad, leader of Indian National Congress, demanded that bill should be withdrawn as it was 'politically motivated'.

Subramanian Swamy, nominated member in Rajya Sabha, said that all are equal before law and 'Gandhis' can't be given special treatment and added that the assassination of Indira Gandhi had nothing to do with lack of security. Naresh Gujral, Shiromani Akali Dal politician and Rajya Sabha member, called that security has over time became a status symbol.
