= Special Protection Group =

Indian Protective Service Agency

Special Protection Group (SPG)
- Emblem of the Special Protection Group

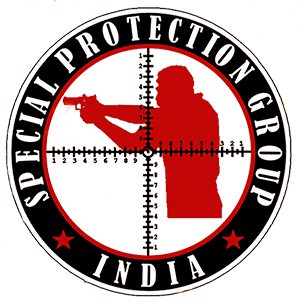
- Tactical Uniform Patch

- Flag of the Special Protection Group
- Abbreviation: SPG
- Motto: Śauryam Samarpaṇam Surakṣaṇam; Bravery, Dedication, Security

Agency overview
- Formed: 8 April 1985; 41 years ago
- Employees: 3,000 active personnel
- Annual budget: ₹499.99 crore (US$53 million) (2026–27)

Jurisdictional structure
- Operations jurisdiction: India (and abroad)
- Governing body: Cabinet Secretariat
- Constituting instrument: Special Protection Group Act, 1988

Operational structure
- Headquarters: New Delhi
- Agency executives: Rajiv Singh, IPS, Secretary (Security); Alok Sharma, IPS, Director of the Special Protection Group

Facilities
- Prime Minister's Vehicles: Mercedes-Maybach S650 2 cars; Range Rover Sentinel (2015) 4 cars; Range Rover Sentinel (2019) 2 cars; Toyota Fortuner (AN160) 30 cars; Toyota Land Cruiser (2012) 4 cars; Toyota Land Cruiser (2016) 4 cars; BMW 760Li High Security 3 cars

Website
- spg.nic.in

The Special Protection Group (SPG) is an agency under the Cabinet Secretariat of the Government of India, whose sole responsibility is protecting the Prime Minister of India and, in some cases, their family. It was formed in 1988 by an Act of the Parliament of India. The agency protects the Prime Minister at all times, both in India andas well as the Prime Minister's immediate family members. Family members, however, may decline security.

Previously, the SPG's mandate included protecting the prime minister's "parents, wife [sic] and children" resident anywhere in India during their term of office and for five years after leaving office. However, the Special Protection Group (Amendment) Act, 2019 reduced such mandate. Presently, Prime Minister Narendra Modi is the only SPG protectee.

== History ==
Before 1981, the security of the prime minister at their official residence was the responsibility of the Special Security District of the Delhi Police, overseen by an officer of the rank of Deputy Commissioner of Police (DCP). This model was adopted from the United Kingdom, where the prime minister of the United Kingdom is protected by London's Metropolitan Police Service. In October 1981, a Special Task Force (STF) was established by the Intelligence Bureau (IB) to provide transportation security and road escorts for the Prime Minister during travels in and out of New Delhi.

After the assassination of Prime Minister Indira Gandhi by two of her Delhi Police security personnel in October 1984, a review was undertaken by a Committee of Secretaries of the Ministry of Home Affairs. Given the breach, it was decided to entrust security of the Prime Minister to an exclusive unit under direct control of the STF to provide the Prime Minister with proximate security at all times. These decisions were initially taken as short-term measures.

On 18 February 1985, the Ministry of Home Affairs set up the Birbal Nath Committee to examine the issue and submit recommendations to the government for prime ministerial security. In March 1985, the Committee submitted its recommendation for the raising of an independent agency for prime ministerial protection, known as the Special Protection Unit (SPU). On 30 March 1985, the President of India, by executive order, created 819 posts for the unit within the Cabinet Secretariat. The unit was renamed to Special Protection Group, led by a Director who would be an Indian Police Service officer with the rank of Inspector General of Police.

S. Subramaniam, then the Joint Director (VIP Security) in the Intelligence Bureau, assumed office as the first Director of the SPG. Initially, the establishment of the SPG necessitated a new distribution of responsibility to various agencies concerned with the security of the Prime Minister. With 819 posts, the new agency lacked the manpower to provide complete protection to the Prime Minister's person, office, residence and dependents, and remained dependent on the Delhi Police and state police units for logistics and transportation. The Blue Book, an existing manual for the protection of the Prime Minister, was amended to incorporate new proximate security protocols.

Under the new arrangements, on domestic visits, the Intelligence Bureau and concerned State Police were responsible for coordination, collection and dissemination of intelligence affecting the Prime Minister's security. State Police and the SPG would then provide physical security arrangements for the Prime Minister in two layers. The SPG operated under the authority of its constituting executive order for three years without legislation, from April 1985 to June 1988. That year, the Rajiv Gandhi Government passed the Special Protection Group Act to codify the order's provisions.

At the time, the Act only permitted security for the Prime Minister and his immediate relatives. When Rajiv Gandhi left office in 1989, he ceased to receive SPG protection as Leader of the Opposition. This occurred despite the significant threat to his life following his government's military intervention in the Sri Lankan Civil War. In May 1991, Rajiv Gandhi was assassinated at a political rally in Tamil Nadu by a suicide bomber of the Liberation Tigers of Tamil Eelam, a Sri Lankan organisation. After his assassination, the SPG Act was amended to provide SPG security to former Prime Ministers and their immediate families for a period of ten years after leaving office. Prior to the end of this period, a security review would be conducted by the IB to determine a protectee's current threat and the need for extensions (which would last five years). For this reason, Gandhi's widow, Sonia Gandhi, and her children, Rahul Gandhi and Priyanka Gandhi received SPG protection for 28 years (until 2019) owing to their political activity in the Indian National Congress.

On 27 November 2019, the Parliament of India passed the Special Protection Group (Amendment Act), 2019 which limited SPG protection only to the PM and his immediate family members residing with him at his official residence. Under the amended legislation, former Prime Ministers are eligible for an extension of their protection for up to five years after leaving office, subject to a threat assessment by the Intelligence Bureau. The bill was opposed by the Indian National Congress, fearing that the Gandhi Family would face a greater risk of violence without SPG protection. After its passage, these individuals, along with former prime minister Manmohan Singh, Heeraben Modi and Jashodaben Modi, the mother and estranged wife, respectively, of incumbent Prime Minister Narendra Modi, lost SPG protection. They were instead accorded different levels of security ranging from Z+ to Y by the Ministry of Home Affairs. The bill reduced the SPG's legal protectees to Modi, who lives alone at his official residence.

== Organisation ==
The Director is assisted by number of Deputy Directors, Assistant Directors, Joint Assistant Directors. The SPG is divided broadly into the following four categories:

- Operations: Performs actual protection duties. In the Operations Branch, there are sub-components such as the Communications Wing, Technical Wing and Transport Wing.
- Training: Trains new and existing personnel on a continuous basis. The SPG trains officers in physical efficiency, marksmanship, anti-sabotage checks, communication and other operative aspects connected with close protection drills and influencing security. The training programme is constantly reviewed and updated to effectively thwart threats from newer areas and in keeping with existing threat perception.
- Intelligence and Tours: Threat assessment, internal intelligence pertaining to personnel, verification of character and antecedents and other allied jobs.
- Administration: Deals with human resources, finance, procurement and other related matters.

=== Command and control ===
The "general superintendence, direction and control" of the SPG is exercised by the Government of India. The head of the force, the Director, who is the operational head of the force, is responsible for "the command and supervision" of the force. The director of the SPG since its inception has been an officer of the Indian Police Service (IPS) and, today, holds the rank of Director General of Police. While the Secretary (Security) in the Cabinet Secretariat, who is also an IPS officer, is the administrative head and looks after the administrative matters of the force.

The SPG does not directly recruit personnel. Recruits are instead drawn from the enlisted ranks of the Central Armed Police Forces and Railway Protection Force. Personnel from these services may apply for deputation to the SPG and undergo rigorous physical and psychological assessments as well as enhanced security screening. Deputation to the SPG usually lasts six years but may be extended at the Director's discretion. Officers of the SPG, responsible for leadership and coordination, are drawn from the IPS.

== Rank structure ==
Insignia	Position in Special Protection Group	Police equivalent rank	Grade/level on pay matrix	Basic Pay
	Director of the Special Protection Group	Director General of Police	Apex Scale (Pay level 17)	₹225,000 (US$2,400)
	Additional Director General (ADG)	Additional Director General of Police	HAG Scale (Pay level 15)	₹182,200 (US$1,900)—₹224,100 (US$2,400)
	Inspector General (IG)	Inspector General of Police	SAG scale (Pay level 14)	₹144,200 (US$1,500)—₹218,200 (US$2,300)
	Deputy Inspector General (DIG)	Deputy inspector general of police	Selection grade (Pay level 13A)	₹131,100 (US$1,400)—₹216,600 (US$2,300)
	Assistant Inspector General (AIG)	Senior Superintendent of Police	Selection Grade (Pay level 13)	₹123,100 (US$1,300)—₹215,900 (US$2,300)
	Assistant Inspector General (AIG)	Superintendent of Police	Junior Administrative Grade (Pay level 12)	₹78,800 (US$840)—₹209,200 (US$2,200)
	Senior Security Officer (SSO)	Addl Superintendent of Police	Senior time scale (Pay level 11)	₹67,700 (US$720)—₹208,700 (US$2,200)
	Senior Security Officer (SSO)	Deputy Superintendent of Police	Junior time scale (Pay level 10)	₹56,100 (US$600)—₹132,000 (US$1,400)
	Security Officer-I (SO-I)	Inspector of Police	Group 'B' Non-gazetted (Pay level 7)	₹44,900 (US$480)—₹142,400 (US$1,500)
	Security Officer-II (SO-II)	Sub-inspector of police	Group 'B' Non-gazetted (Pay level 6)	₹35,400 (US$380)—₹112,400 (US$1,200)
	Junior Security Officer (JSO)	Assistant sub-inspector of police	Group 'C' Non-gazetted (Pay level 5)	₹29,200 (US$310)—₹92,300 (US$990)
	Senior Security Assistant (SSA)	Head constable	Group 'C' Non-gazetted (Pay level 4)	₹25,500 (US$270)—₹81,100 (US$870)
	Security Assistant (SA)	Constable	Group 'C' Non-gazetted (Pay level 3)	₹21,700 (US$230)—₹69,100 (US$740)

== Current responsibilities ==
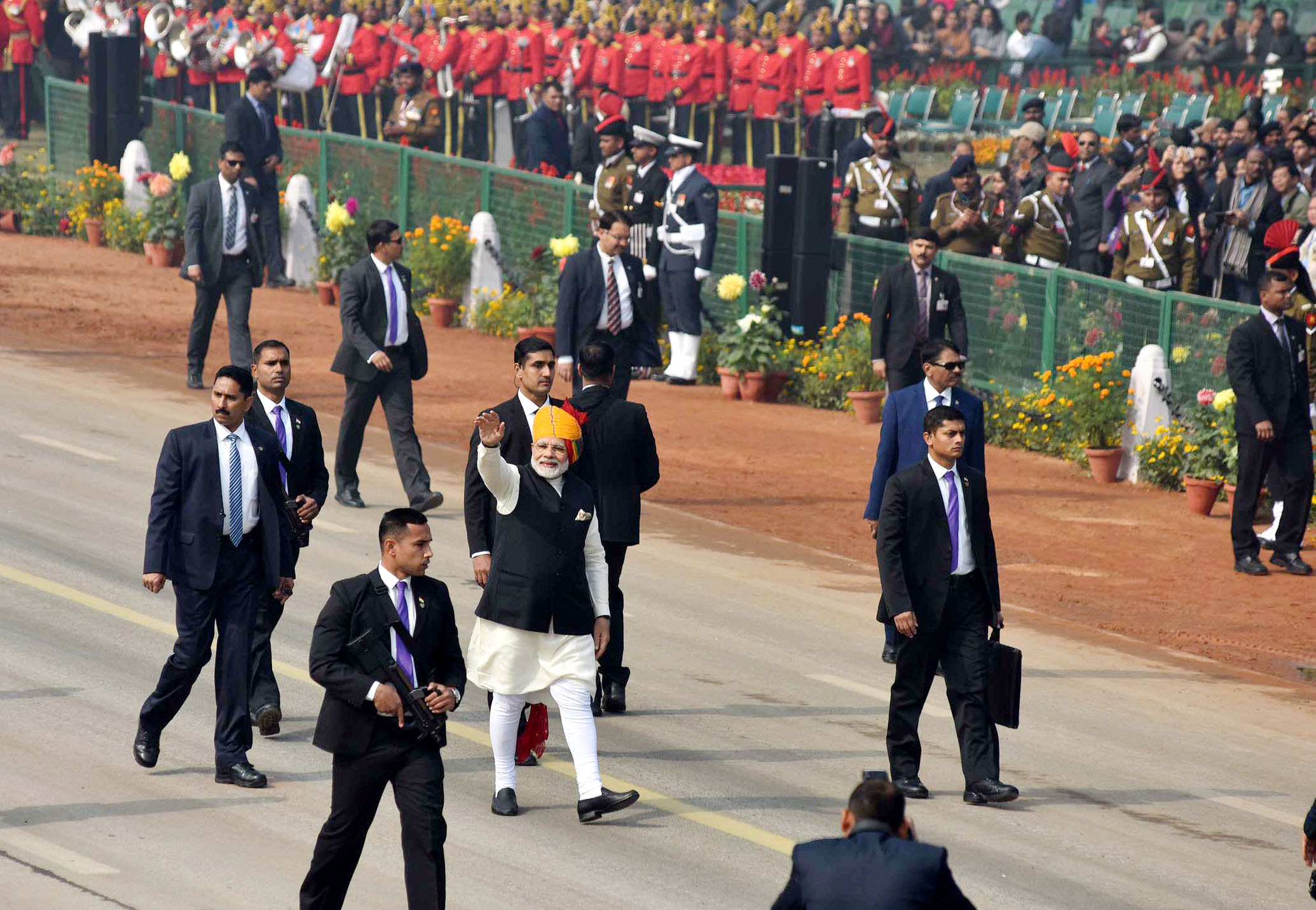
Prime Minister Narendra Modi surrounded by SPG at Republic Day Parade 2018.

Narendra Modi, the incumbent Prime Minister of India, is currently the only person under SPG protection. Sonia Gandhi and her children, Rahul Gandhi and Priyanka Gandhi were granted SPG protection for 28 years from 1991 to 2019. Two of their family members, then Prime Minister Indira Gandhi and then former prime minister Rajiv Gandhi, were assassinated in 1984 and 1991, respectively, with the Government of India assessing a continued threat to their safety. On 8 November 2019, the Government of India withdrew their SPG security details and accorded them with Z+ Security. This decision followed the Government's withdrawal of an SPG detail for Modi's predecessor, Manmohan Singh.

Additionally, under terms of the Special Protection Group (Amendment) Act, 2019, SPG security details for Modi's estranged wife, Jashodaben, and mother, Heeraben, were withdrawn that same year. The Act amended the SPG's legal mandate to protect the incumbent Prime Minister's "parents, wife and children" to "immediate family members residing (with the Prime Minister) at his official residence."

SPG protectees, by law, are exempt from personal security screening at all airports in India and may access VIP lounges at airports operated by the Airports Authority of India. Additionally, they are exempt from security screening when entering certain official buildings, including the Prime Minister's Office and residence.

== Equipment ==
Name	Country of origin	Type	Users
Glock 17	Austria	Semi-automatic pistol	Uniformed officers
Glock 19	Austria	Semi-automatic pistol	Uniformed officers
Five-seveN	Belgium	Semi-automatic pistol	Special Intervention Unit (SIU) and uniformed officers
FN P90	Belgium	Submachine gun	Uniformed officers
Modern Sub Machine Carbine	India	Submachine gun	Selected to be used by the SPG after trials in 2019
FN F2000	Belgium	Assault rifle	Special Intervention Unit (SIU)
FN SCAR	Belgium	Assault rifle	Special Intervention Unit (SIU)

== Vehicles ==
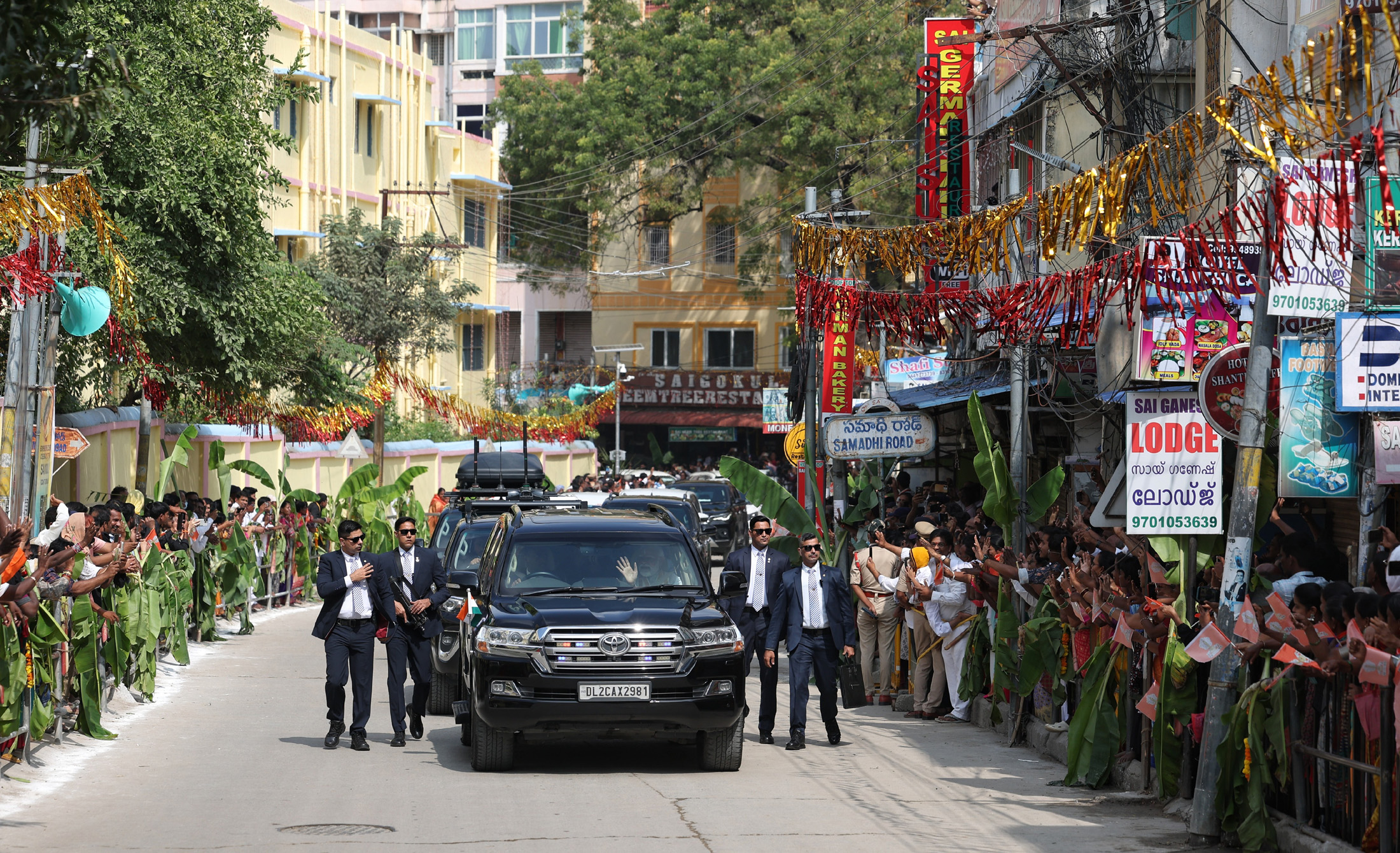
“Prime Minister of India at a public event with SPG security visible

The Prime Minister's motorcade comprises a fleet of vehicles, the core of which consists of at least two Mercedes-Maybach S650 guards/Range Rovers, twelve Toyota Fortuners and a Mercedes-Benz Sprinter ambulance. A Toyota Fortuner Electronic Countermeasures car also accompanies the convoy, besides many more escort vehicles.

- Mercedes-Maybach S650 guard.

The customised armoured vehicle has VR10 level of protection.

For official movement, the Indian flag is fender-mounted on the driver's side of the vehicles, and if taken abroad, the flag of the foreign country is fender-mounted on the passenger's side.

- Range Rover (L405) Sentinel

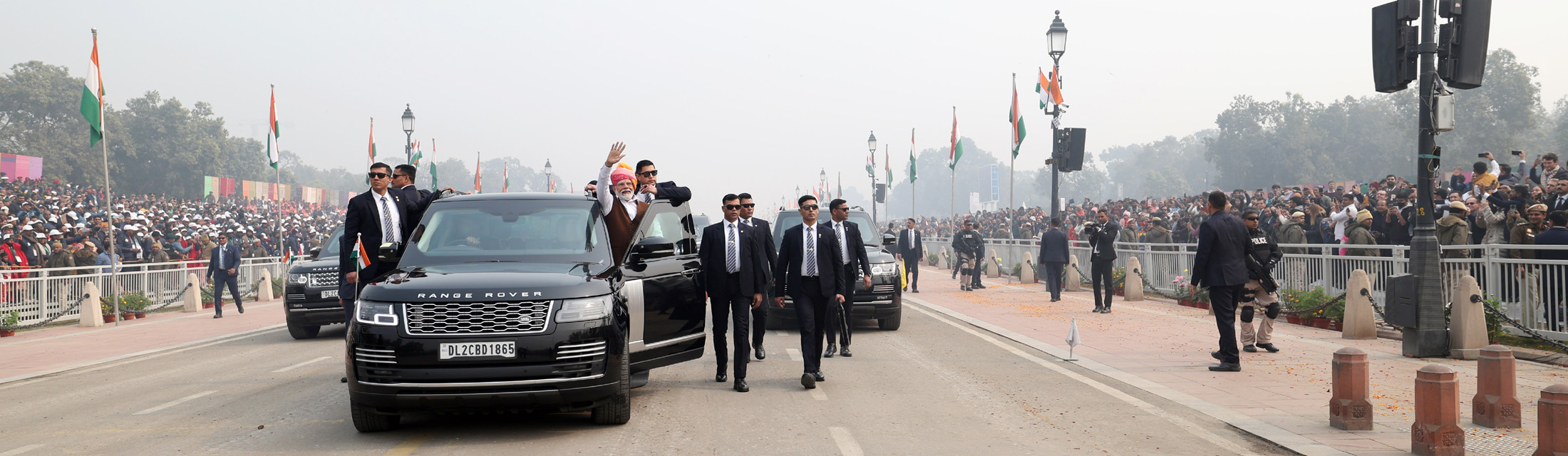
PM at Kartavya Path on the occasion of 75th Republic Day celebrations

These armoured variants of the standard wheelbase 2016 Range Rover Autobiography SUV are used as transportation of the Prime Minister. If not being used by the Prime Minister themselves, they are used to transport members of the Prime Minister's immediate family accompanying them as part of the motorcade. These SUVs are armoured by Land Rover's Special Vehicle Operations facility in Coventry, England, and are certified with VR8 in the BRV 2009 ballistics protection ratings. They can withstand some of the most damaging and targeted of threats, including penetration by 7.62mm high velocity armour piercing incendiary bullets, they can protect occupants against up to 15 kg lateral Trinitrotoluene (TNT) blasts and defend against DM51 grenade explosions from both beneath the floor and above the sunroof. Run-flat tyres allow the vehicle to be driven even if the tyres are deflated. The chassis is reinforced with super-high-strength steel, and the standard glass has been replaced by multi-laminated armoured privacy glass of optical quality. The suspension is upgraded as compared to the standard Range Rover, while an anti-tamper exhaust, self-sealing fuel tank, auxiliary back-up battery and split-charging battery system provide added protection and security.

For official movement, the Indian flag is fender-mounted on the driver's side of the vehicles, and if taken abroad, the flag of the foreign country is fender-mounted on the passenger's side.

- Toyota Fortuner (AN160)

These SUVs carry the SPG Special Agents and Uniformed Officers assigned to the Prime Ministerial Security Detail. 8 Fortuners accompany the motorcade at all times. The protection levels on the Toyota SUVs are undisclosed.

- Mercedes-Benz Sprinter

These are armoured tactical medical support vehicles to the Prime Minister, at least two of which are always spotted to the rear of the motorcade. They carry at least a litre of the prime minister's blood type, for emergency transfusions.

- Toyota Fortuner Electronic Countermeasures Vehicle

This vehicle is used to counter guided attacks, such as IEDs, Rocket Propelled Grenades, and Anti-Tank Guided Missiles. The antennas mounted on the roof are used in barrage jamming applications and for scouting purposes, the primary method used to counter IED threats. The antenna configuration can be changed according to threat level, for instance, taller antennas are used to increase the jamming protection distance, or change jamming frequency ranges. There are two dome-shaped EW Sensors. The EW sensors are millimetre-wave radars used to detect the launch of an RPG (Rocket Propelled Grenades) or laser range finder illumination and launch of an Anti-Tank Guided Missile (ATGM).

=== Air transport ===
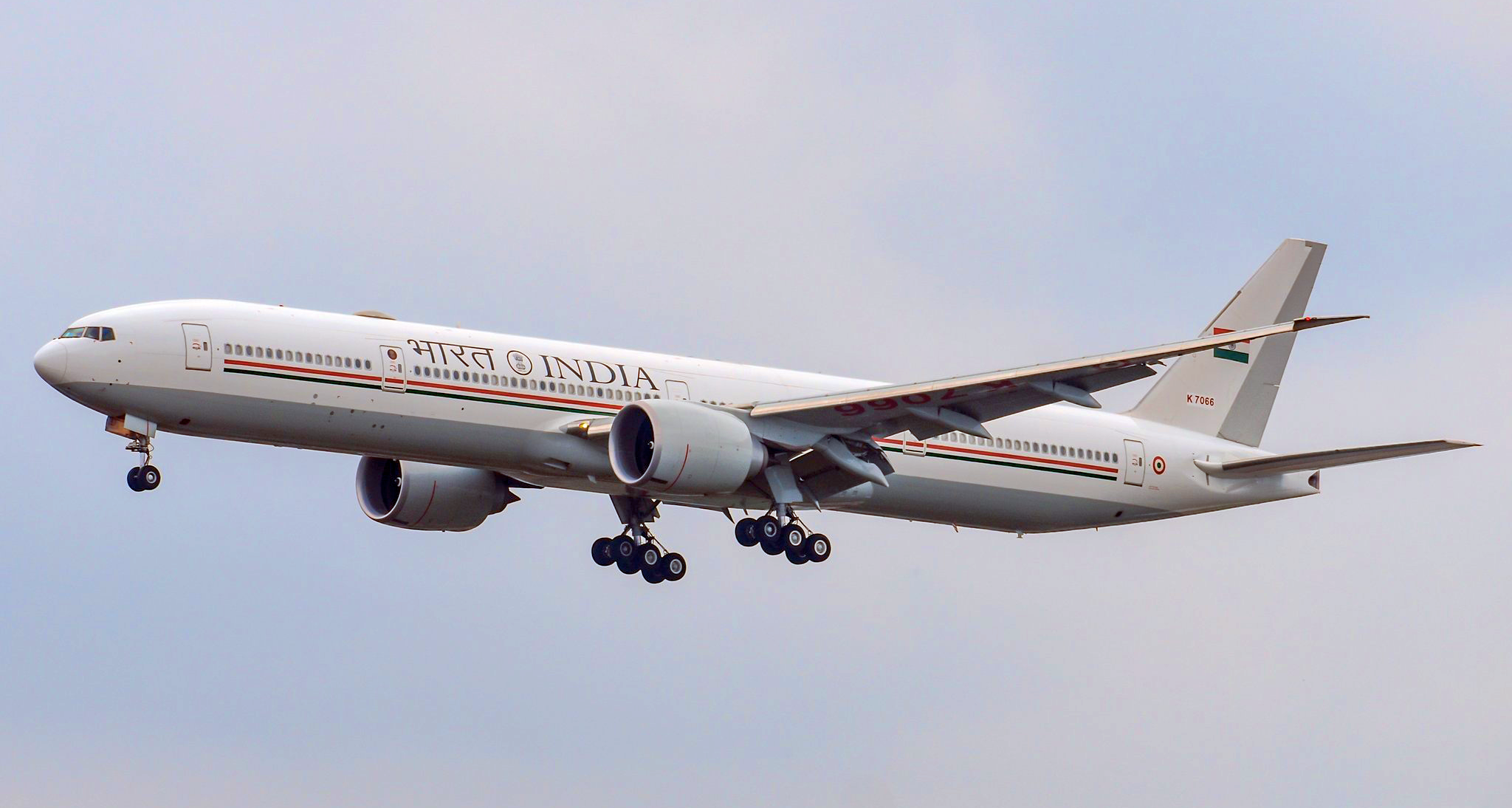
India One Boeing 777

- India One: India One, also referred to as I1, is the call sign of any aircraft carrying the President of India, Vice President of India or the Prime Minister of India. These flights are operated as VIP flights by the Indian Air Force (IAF). Previously, one of two modified Boeing 747-400 passenger aircraft, used otherwise for normal service, would be utilised for the Prime Minister's overseas travel. However, in 2020, these were replaced with two customised Boeing 777-300ER aircraft with distinct national markings – built in the United States along the lines of Air Force One. Additionally, for domestic flights, the IAF currently owns four 14-seater Embraer-135 aircraft and three customised 46-seater Boeing Business Jet (BBJ) 737s that have a VIP cabin. PM Narendra Modi once used an Indian Air Force Lockheed C-130J during his visit to Sri Lanka.
- Mi-17 helicopters: The Ministry of Defence has approved the "conversion" of six new Mi-17 V5s to replace the old Mi-8 helicopters with IAF's elite Communications Squadron to ferry the President and Prime Minister. Mi-17 V5s have advanced avionics, on-board navigation systems and night-vision devices. The SPG wanted the helicopters to have "high tail booms" to allow cars to come right next to the rear exit staircase without "exposing" passengers to a threat from anyone in the vicinity, additional transit range, better crashworthiness and armour protection.

== Contact with the Media ==
Members of the SPG are barred by the SPG Act from contact with the media or from publishing or collaborating in the publication of "any book, letter or other document" related to their work, including upon retirement from Government Service. The SPG and its personnel are exempt from any information disclosure requests under the Right to Information Act, 2005.

== See also ==
- President's Bodyguard
