= PM CARES Fund =

Fund set up for COVID-19 outbreak in India

- Prime Minister’s Citizen Assistance and Relief in Emergency Situations Fund
- Formation: 27 March 2020; 6 years ago
- Headquarters: Prime Minister's Office, South Block, New Delhi
- Trustees: K. T. Thomas; Kariya Munda; Ratan Tata (formerly)
- Advisory Board: Rajiv Mehrishi; Sudha Murthy; Anand Shah
- Website: pmcares.gov.in

The Prime Minister's Citizen Assistance and Relief in Emergency Situations Fund (PM CARES Fund) was created on 27 March 2020, following the COVID-19 pandemic in India. Although it is named for the Prime Minister of India, and uses the State Emblem of India, it is a private fund, used at the discretion of the Prime Minister and the Fund's trustees, and does not form a part of the Government of India's accounts. The Fund was established for the purpose of addressing the COVID-19 pandemic in India, in 2020. While complete documentation for the Fund's establishment has not been made public, the Government of India has stated that the Prime Minister of India, Narendra Modi, is the chairman of the fund, and that trustees include the Minister of Defence, Rajnath Singh; the Minister of Home Affairs, Amit Shah, the Minister of Finance, Nirmala Sitharaman, and several corporate leaders and industrialists, including Ratan Tata, and Sudha Murty.

The total amount of funds donated and the names of donors have not been publicly disclosed, and the fund is privately audited. It is not subject to audits by India's Comptroller and Auditor General, and the Government of India has denied access to documentation involving the fund under India's transparency law, the Right to Information Act, arguing that it is not a government fund and consequently not liable to disclose either earnings or spendings. The Fund has collected financing through public donations from Indian citizens as well as foreign groups such as Russia's State-owned defence exports company Rosoboronexport. It has also collected funding by substantial transfers of amounts allocated for corporate social responsibility in government-owned public sector corporations, universities, and banks as well as deductions from salaries of government employees. Consequently, the PM CARES Fund has faced criticism for the lack of transparency and accountability in relation to its establishment, functioning, and accounts. Substantial litigation regarding this is ongoing.

While total accounts for the Fund have not been made public, and cannot be subject to transparency and disclosure laws, partial accounts released by the Fund as well as statements by government officials indicate that part of their corpus has been spent on procuring vaccines against COVID-19, as well as to purchase ventilators following large scale shortage of such facilities, as well as oxygen, during the COVID-19 pandemic in India. While funds have been promised for vaccine development in 2020, these have not been allotted as of 2022, and two-thirds of the corpus remains unspent. Additionally, ventilators purchased by the funds have been criticised over quality concerns, with several hospitals returning them as they were not usable for patients and government panels flagging quality issues. Additionally, concerns have been raised about the processing of tendering, as several manufacturers were found to have had no experience in manufacturing ventilators before this.

== Legal framework ==
=== Establishment and legal status ===
==== Establishment ====
The documentation concerning the establishment of the PM CARES Fund was not made publicly available until December 2020, although the Fund was established in March of that year. Officials have described the Fund as a "public charitable trust" and stated that the deed establishing the trust was registered on 27 March 2020. In June 2020, the Prime Minister's Office stated in response to an application for the disclosure of the founding documents of the trust, that the Fund is not a "public authority" as far as transparency laws such as the Right to Information Act 2005 are concerned, and declined to provide the documentation. In December 2020, a trust deed in relation to the Fund was posted on its website, which contained a clause indicating that the Fund, although it bore the national emblem, and used government infrastructure, was a private entity. There is ambiguity on whether the PM CARES Fund is a public body, subject to transparency laws and mandatory audits, or a private body which is completely exempt from scrutiny by representative bodies.

A complete list of trustees of the Fund is not publicly available, although government officials have stated that the Fund is chaired by the Prime Minister of India, Narendra Modi, and has additionally ex-officio members including the Defence minister, the Home minister and the Finance minister. In April 2020, government officials were reported as stating that the Fund "could have" 3 experts appointed by the Prime Minister to advise on the spending of the Fund's resources. Officials also suggested that the trust deed would allow for the creation of an advisory panel of ten members to provide similar advice.

In August 2020, a petition filed under the Right to Information Act 2005 to the Cabinet Secretariat disclosed that the establishment of the PM CARES Fund had not been discussed by the cabinet before it was established. Petitions for additional information on the establishment of the Fund, filed with the Ministry of Law and Justice, have not been answered.

==== Legal status ====
PM CARES Fund has been registered as a Public Charitable Trust. The trust deed of PM CARES Fund has been registered under the Registration Act, 1908 at New Delhi on 27 March 2020. Documentation disclosed by the Government of India in December 2020, after a sustained campaign for transparency regarding the Fund, reveals that the Trust Deed constituting the Fund describes it as a private trust, stating "The trust is neither intended to be or is in fact owned, controlled or substantially financed by any government or any instrumentality of the government." This stance was contradicted by the Government of India a few weeks later, which admitted in a formal response to an RTI petition that the Fund was "owned by, controlled by and established by the government of India". The Government of India has repeatedly denied the supply of information regarding the Fund under India's transparency law, the Right to Information Act 2005, which applies to all public bodies, on the grounds that it is not a public body. In December 2020, following several assertions from the Government of India that the PM CARES Fund was a private body, and not a public fund, an application was moved to question the use of the national emblem of India in the Fund's documentation. As it is illegal for the national emblem to be used for private entities, the application sought prosecution under the State Emblem of India (Prohibition of Improper Use) Act, 2005, for using the national emblem in the PM CARES Fund documentation. The Government of India, in response, has asserted now that it is a public body, controlled by the Government of India, but is still not subject to transparency laws like the RTI Act.

=== Legal exemptions ===
==== Foreign donations and FCRA exemptions without audits ====
The initial announcements accepting donations to the PM CARES Fund included details allowing domestic and international transfers of funds, and Indian ambassadors were directed to mobilise donations from foreign countries. The Government of India announced that it would be setting aside a 15-year old policy of declining foreign aid in cases of disasters and calamities.

Foreign contributions and donations are regulated by the Foreign Contribution (Regulation) Act 2010 (FCRA) which requires registration, and regular documentation of funds received; however, the Fund has been exempted from all provisions of the FCRA. Per an order of the Home Ministry from 2011 and a subsequent order on in January 2020, organisations that are given exemptions from the provisions of the FCRA must be compulsorily audited by the Comptroller and Auditor General of India (CAG). However, the PM CARES Fund is not being audited by the CAG, and is being audited by a private party appointed directly by the Government of India instead.

==== Tax exemptions ====
In April 2020, the Government of India issued an ordinance to exempt donations made to the Fund before 30 June, allowing them to qualify for a tax deduction under section 80G of The Income-tax Act, 1961.

==== Retrospective amendments for corporate social responsibility exemptions ====
The PM CARES Fund was initially announced as a public body, on its establishment, and the day after it was established, the Ministry of Corporate Affairs announced that donations to the fund would be eligible as corporate social responsibility (CSR) contributions, allowing companies to claim tax exemptions on donations to the Fund. The Ministry of Corporate Affairs announced in March 2020 that donations would be counted as part of the statutory Corporate Social Responsibility (CSR) obligation of the companies, with additional CSR being offset in subsequent years. As the Companies Act 2013 only allowed CSR exemptions for funds established by the government for socio-economic development and relief work, the Ministry of Corporate Affairs issued a circular in March 2020, authorising exemptions for the PM CARES Fund, noting that it was a public fund established by the Central Government. Prior guidelines concerning donations to similar funds such as the Prime Minister's National Relief Fund disallowed CSR exemptions, and a government panel had described these as allowing the same tax benefits twice, amounting to a "regressive incentive".

However, the Prime Minister's Office and other government authorities subsequently declined to provide information regarding the PM CARES Fund on the grounds that it was not a public authority. Subsequent disclosures of the PM CARES Trust deed indicated that the Fund was not a public body, and therefore donations to the Fund would not qualify for CSR exemptions. In order to remedy the illegality of the original exemption, the Ministry of Corporate Affairs amended the relevant schedule to the Companies Act 2013, to allow CSR donations to funds that were not set up by the Government of India. The amendment was made with retrospective effect, to cover any donations made prior to the amendment. Information obtained under the Right to Information Act by the Huffington Post has revealed that the exemptions were made at the request of a Bhaskar Kulbe, advisor to Prime Minister Narendra Modi.

Donations made to the state governments' initiatives and other national relief funds, such the Prime Minister's National Relief Fund or Chief Minister's Funds do not qualify for the CSR exemption.

=== Existing relief funds ===
The establishment of the PM CARES Fund has been criticised on the grounds that there already exists the Prime Minister's National Relief Fund (PMNRF), which was established in 1948 to provide relief and assistance to those suffering in times of natural disasters, calamities, and riots. In addition to political opposition, the Chief Ministers of several states questioned about the preference for PM CARES over the individual relief funds of each state. The PMNRF is directly managed by the Prime Minister's Office and donations made to it are exempt under the Income Tax Act 1960. It has been utilized since 1948 to provide relief and assistance in several instances. Like the PM CARES Fund, donations to the PMNRF are not transparent and names of donors or amounts of donors are not publicly disclosed or subject to audit. Activists working on transparency and accountability in PMNRF Funds suggested that rather than set up a separate, similar fund, the Government of India could restructure the PMNRF itself, bringing it under parliamentary oversight and disclosing details of funding and spending.

There is also an existing National Disaster Response Fund (NDRF) established under the Disaster Management Act of 2005. In a challenge at the Supreme Court, the Government of India distinguished the PM CARES Fund on the grounds that the NDRF does not accept private donations and is publicly funded.

Newspaper reports suggest that officials have sought to differentiate the PM CARES Fund from the PMNRF, pointing out that the PM CARES has a defined objective in its trust deed, unlike the general relief aims of the PMNRF, and that the trust deed of the PM CARES Fund allows the Prime Minister to appoint experts as advisors in the allocation of funds. Commentators have also suggested that the reduced oversight on spending in PM CARES Fund allows money to be allocated more quickly, particularly as authorisation processes applicable to government spending are not required. However, specific details concerning the distinction between PM CARES and PMNRF are not clear, as the trust deed and other governing documents for PM CARES have not been publicly disclosed. Legal experts have also argued that a dedicated fund for addressing concerns from the COVID-19 pandemic would be more effective than the PMNRF, which deals with various kinds of disasters and crises. However, the announcement of the PM CARES Fund by Prime Minister Narendra Modi indicated that its use was not limited to the COVID-19 pandemic, noting that the Fund would also cater to future "distressing situations" apart from the COVID-19 pandemic. At the time that the PM CARES Fund was established, the PMNRF had an already existing unspent fund of ₹3800 crores.

== Income and expenditure ==
=== Corpus ===
The total amount currently donated to the PM CARES fund has not been disclosed publicly. In September 2020, a statement was uploaded to the PM CARES website indicating that the total amount donated to the fund between 27 March 2020, when the fund was established, and 31 March 2020, was ₹30.76 billion. The statement does not disclose the names and identities of the donors. The statement indicates the receipts (in crore rupees) as:

| Year | Receipts | Balance | Ref |
|---|---|---|---|
| 2019-20 | 3076.62 | 3076.62 | 2019-20 |
| 2020-21 | 10990.17 | 7013.99 | 2020-21 |

The Times of India reported on 19 May 2020 that it had received an estimated amount of US$1.4 billion (₹10,600 crore) within the first two months of its establishment but noted that the data on the total amount of donations received had not been disclosed by the Government of India and could potentially exceed this amount. Based on publicly available news reports of donations declared by various corporations and individuals, Times of India has suggested that 53% of this amount is from private sector corporations and employees, while 42% is from public sector undertakings and their employees in India, and the remaining 5% is from individuals.

The fund enables micro-donations. The minimum donation accepted for the Fund is ₹10 (equivalent to ₹13 or 14¢ US in 2026).

=== Voluntary donations ===
A number of celebrities, including athletes, actors, and corporations have pledged support to the PM CARES Fund. Several public-sector undertakings have pledged support to the Fund. In addition, several government officials have pledged support by donating part of their salaries, although concerns have been raised about circulars mandating or requiring such donations from government officials.

Private sector corporations that have pledged support include Larsen & Toubro, Infosys Foundation, the Adani Foundation, Reliance Industries, the Hero Group, the TATA Trust, Paytm and the Azim Premji Foundation. Private individuals who have pledged support to the PM CARES include actors Akshay Kumar, Deepika Padukone and Ranveer Singh, Shah Rukh Khan, producer Karan Johar.

=== Foreign donations ===
The Government of India announced that it would be setting aside a 15-year old policy of declining foreign aid in cases of disasters and calamities, in order to accept foreign donations to the PM CARES Fund. The Fund has since received pledges of support from a number of foreign entities and persons, including Russia's State-owned defence exports company Rosoboronexport. In January 2021, an RTI application was filed seeking information about whether the Fund had received donations from Pakistan and China, after Indian embassies for those countries solicited donations to the Fund on their social media handles. A response from the High Commissions in Pakistan and China admitted to soliciting donations but confirmed that they had not personally solicited donations, and nor had such donations had been received from those countries.

=== Transfer of funds from public sector undertakings, banks, and educational institutions ===
In August 2020, petitions filed under the Right to Information Act 2005 by the Indian Express to 32 public sector undertakings (PSUs) in India indicated that a total of ₹21050 million had been transferred to the PM CARES Fund, primarily from their corporate social responsibility budget allocations for 2019-20 and 2020–21. A petition for the same information that was made to the Prime Minister's Office was denied, with the Government of India stating that the Fund was not a public authority and did not have to account for the funds under the Right to Information Act. In December 2020, the Indian Express reported that a total of 101 public sector units had transferred ₹2,400 crore (equivalent to ₹31 billion or US$330 million in 2026) from their corporate social responsibility funds, and a total of ₹155 crore (equivalent to ₹199 crore or US$21 million in 2026) from staff salaries, to the PM CARES Fund.

RTI applications filed directly to PSUs have also demonstrated that the transfer of finances to the PM CARES Fund were taken from staff salaries. Several public sector banks, including State Bank of India, Union Bank of India, Central Bank of India, Bank of Maharashtra, and Small Industries Development Bank of India, as well as public sector undertakings and regulators like Life Insurance Corporation of India and Insurance Regulatory and Development Authority, together contributed ₹2047.5 million to the PM CARES Fund. While some of the PSUs had sourced these transfers from their CSR allocations, the Indian Express stated that their Right to Information petitions revealed that in one case, the CSR allocation had been exceeded, and in others, the amount of allocation had not been finally decided when the transfer was made. Applications for this information that were filed directly to the PM CARES Fund.

RTI applications filed to government-funded educational institutions also indicate that a total sum of ₹218.1 million has been transferred to the PM CARES Fund from staff salaries and pension accounts. Institutions such as NCERT, Banaras Hindu University, Aligarh Muslim University, and Central Sanskrit University, as well as 20 Indian Institutes of Technology transferred funds from staff salary accounts (including both, teaching and non-teaching staff), as well as from pension funds, research funds, and student funds.

=== Transfer of funds from the Indian military ===
In March 2020, the Indian Defence Ministry released a statement, indicating that it would encourage military personnel to donate one day's salary to the PM CARES Fund, and that their aim was to collect approximately ₹500 crore (equivalent to ₹642 crore or US$69 million in 2026) from such donations.

In 2020, the Indian Express filed Right to Information petitions with all three branches of the Indian military - the Indian Army, Air Force, and Navy, seeking details of transfers made to the PM CARES Fund. The Indian Navy disclosed that it had transferred a sum of ₹12.41 crore (equivalent to ₹16 crore or US$1.7 million in 2026) between April and October 2020 to the PM CARES Fund, “in respect of officers and sailors” and also a sum of ₹4.36 crore (equivalent to ₹5.6 crore or US$600,000 in 2026) "in respect of civilian personnel". The Navy declined to disclose details of contributions made to the PM CARES Fund under any other heads of accounts. The Indian Air Force indicated that a total of ₹29.18 crore (equivalent to ₹37 crore or US$4.0 million in 2026) was transferred to the PM CARES Fund "by IAF personnel". The Indian Army did not reply to the petition, but had previously shared on social networking site Twitter, in May 2020 that "IndianArmy personnel have voluntarily contributed ₹157 crore (equivalent to ₹202 crore or US$22 million in 2026) as one day salary for Apr 2020 towards Nation’s fight against COVID-19 pandemic to PMCARES fund.” In total, the military transferred ₹203.67 crore (equivalent to ₹262 crore or US$28 million in 2026) to the PM CARES Fund.

=== Default and mandatory donations ===
On 3 April 2020, doctors' associations at the All India Institute of Medical Sciences, New Delhi objected to a circular from the hospital's administration, indicating that a day's salary would be deducted from their accounts and donated to the PM CARES Fund. The AIIMS administration ultimately withdrew their circular and accepted a proposal that doctors could opt in to a scheme to donate to the fund or could donate to any charitable organisation of their choice, on a purely voluntary basis. Similar proposals for mandatory or opt-out donations were subsequently withdrawn from three other hospitals based in Delhi following protests from doctors' associations: Safdarjung Hospital, Atal Bihari Vajpayee Institute of Medical Sciences (ABVIMS)-Ram Manohar Lohia (RML) Hospital, and Lady Hardinge Medical College and Hospital.

On 17 April 2020, the Jharkhand High Court ordered six petitioners to deposit ₹35,000 each in the PM CARES Fund, and install the Government of India's COVID-19 surveillance and tracking mobile application, Aarogya Setu, as conditions for granting him bail in a criminal case. In August 2020, the Punjab and Haryana High Court issued a similar order, requiring a deposit of ₹100,000 as costs into the PM CARES Fund.

On 19 April 2020, the registry of the Supreme Court of India issued a notice informing its employees that all officers would be donating three days' salary to the Fund, and that non-gazetted officers, and group-C employees would be donating two and one day's salary respectively. The circular gave employees one day to opt out of donations, stating that failure to opt out would be considered as consent to donating.

On 19 April 2020, the Revenue Department of the Finance Ministry issued a circular indicating that one day's salary per month, from April 2020 to March 2021, from each employee would be redirected to the fund unless employees who were "unwilling to donate" indicated their unwillingness in writing to their departments. The move was criticised by government employees, who noted that this amounted to 12% of a month's salary for government employees, many of whom could not afford to release the funds. The former Comptroller-General of Defence Accounts stated that the opt-out system left employees vulnerable to professional consequences if they did not donate. Other government employees objected on the grounds that it constricted their ability to choose to donate to other relief funds, such as state's Chief Minister Relief Funds. Following public criticism, on 30 April 2020, the Revenue Department amended this circular, making the donation opt-in instead of opt-out, and asking employees to write in if they wished to donate a day's salary every month to the PM CARES Fund.

On 20 April 2020, the Delhi University administration was criticised after funds collected for a donation specifically to the National Disaster Relief Fund were redirected to the Fund without disclosing this to donors. Delhi University officials stated that the funds were redirected on orders from the Ministry of Human Resources Development of the Government of India. The Delhi University Teachers' Association wrote a letter of objection to the Delhi University administration, noting that the university had traditionally supported the NDRF or Chief Minister's Relief Fund either through local Staff Associations or through the Vice Chancellor's Relief Fund, and that the redirection of funds without disclosure constituted a betrayal of trust.

== Spending and allocations ==
The Prime Minister had said that the PMO had received many requests to help in the war against COVID-19 and that the PM CARES Fund would be used for disaster management and research. On 10 May 2020, government officials stated that spending and allocations from the Fund would begin once a "respectable amount" had been collected. The Fund has not disclosed its spending or procurement guidelines.

The first allocations from the fund were announced on 13 May 2020, with a total amount of ₹3,100 crore earmarked for spending. Of this amount, the Government of India stated that funds from PM CARES would be utilised to buy 50,000 ventilators that were manufactured in India, which would then be allocated to government hospitals in states and union territories. An additional sum of ₹1000 crore would be allocated to states and union territories to address issues faced by migrant workers, including provisions for accommodation, food, medical treatment and transportation. ₹100 crore would be allocated for the development of a vaccine against COVID-19, to be spent under the supervision of the Principal Scientific Advisor to the Government. The Secretary to the Department of Biotechnology confirmed that funds spent on developing a vaccine would only be allocated to indigenous research projects.

On 21 June 2020, BJP President J.P. Nadda stated that 60,000 ventilators would be made available via funding from the Fund, by the end of June.

=== Purchases of ventilators and quality concerns ===
On 24 June 2020, the Government of India issued a statement, indicating that 6% of the ventilators ordered by the Fund, i.e. 2,923 of 50,000, had been made, and were allocated to states and union territories facing a high number of cases, such as Maharashtra (275), Delhi (275), Gujarat (175), Bihar (100), Karnataka (90) and Rajasthan (75).

Two government-appointed clinical evaluations committees raised concerns, on 16 May 2020 and 1 June 2020, about the procurement of sub-standard ventilators financed by the PM CARES Fund. These ventilators were purchased from Indian medical start-ups, and were flagged by the medical committees as being insufficient to meet the needs of patients with COVID-19, with a recommendation that they should only be used if a back-up ventilator was available in case of failures. One of the suppliers of these ventilators stated that there were no guidelines or standards that they were required to comply with in order to be eligible for government procurement.

In August 2020, the Ministry of Health and Family Welfare disclosed in response to petitions filed under the Right to Information Act 2005 that two indigenously manufactured ventilator models had failed trials. The ventilators were manufactured by Jyoti CNC Automation and Andhra Pradesh MedTech Zone and were funded by an allocation of ₹225 million from the PM CARES and had failed trials by a technical committee appointed by the Ministry. In September 2020, Trivitron Healthcare, an Indian manufacturer, confirmed to Huffington Post that they had received an order to construct 10,000 ventilators, paid for via the PM CARES Fund, despite having no prior experience in manufacturing ventilators. A representative from Trivitron stated that they had begun to design and manufacture the ventilator, including basic prototypes, after receiving the order.

In July 2020, Delhi-based Loknayak Hospital raised concerns about the ventilators purchased via PM CARES and provided by the Government of India, noting that the ventilators could not deliver sufficient rates of oxygen and could only be used on 10-15% of their patients. Doctors at the Postgraduate Institute of Medical Education and Research, a medical and research facility in Chandigarh, received 10 ventilators provided by the PM CARES Fund, but declined to use them as they were found to be faulty. The civil hospital in Ahmedabad had also written to the Central government in May 2020, indicating that the ventilators acquired by the PM CARES Fund allocations were not functioning as required. The State of Karnataka stated that it would deploy 640 ventilators obtained with PM CARES Fund, but only after they had been tested to confirm that they meet the specifications. In October 2020, the Karnataka Government received 2025 ventilators received via PM CARES Fund support but clarified that these were unnecessary as they did not require additional ventilators in government hospitals. The Karnataka government accordingly launched a scheme to loan these excess ventilators to private health care providers that needed them, but were unsuccessful, because the ventilators did not meet updated treatment protocols for administering oxygen.

In April 2021, the Rajasthan State Government sent an official communication to the Central Government, regarding faulty ventilators that had been allocated using PM-CARES funding. The letter was sent after multiple medical establishments in Rajasthan reported that the ventilators received were defective. On 10 April 2021, the Pimpri-Chichwad Municipal Corporation in Maharashtra reported that 17 out of 72 ventilators supplied using PM CARES Fund had broken down and had not been repaired, and were lying unused.

On 16 July 2020, BJP leader Prabhakar Shinde asked the Municipal Commissioner of Mumbai to take legal action against officials who were not using ventilators donated via PM CARES purchases.

=== 2021 Covid-19 cases and oxygen supplies ===
In October 2020, the Government of India issued an online tender to construct 150 medical oxygen plants in district hospitals in India, later adding 12 more plants for a total of 162. The funds for these plants were allocated via the PM CARES Fund. The responsibility of construction of these plants was provided to the Central Medical Services Society, an autonomous institution directed by the Central Ministry of Health, and not to state governments, as was reported by a number of political activists. An investigation by the news website Scroll in April 2021 indicated that of the 162 plants sanctioned, they could only confirm that 11 plants had been installed of which 5 were operational. On 18 April 2021, the Health Ministry stated that 33 plants had been installed, but did not indicate how many were operational. On 22 April 2021, the Central Government admitted in proceedings before the Delhi High Court that it had previously sanctioned 8 of these oxygen plants for the national capital territory of Delhi, but that only one had been constructed by the Central Government to date. Joint Secretary (Health) Vipun Nayak told the court that a decline in COVID-19 cases during January and February 2021 had led to a slow-down in the construction managed by the Central Government.

On 26 April 2021, the Prime Minister's Office announced that they had allocated funds for the construction of a total of 551 oxygen plants at government hospitals, as well as allocating funds for the acquisition of 100,000 portable oxygen concentrators, in response to widespread oxygen shortages following a rise in COVID-19 cases.

== Accountability and transparency ==
=== Non-disclosure of information ===
On 5 June 2020, the Prime Minister's Office stated that the PM CARES fund did not qualify as a public authority for the purposes of the Right to Information Act 2005, and accordingly refused to disclose a copy of the trust deed that established the fund, any government circulars or documents related to the fund, or the exemption certificates granted to it under the Income Tax Act 1961. This order was challenged by appeal, and the Appellate Authority under the Right to Information Act 2005, in the Prime Minister's office again refused to disclose the information. A challenge against these orders is currently pending in the High Court of Delhi. On 17 August 2020, a second request for information on the PM-CARES Fund under the Right to Information Act 2005 was denied. In October 2020, an application under the Right to Information Act filed with the National Informatics Center indicated that the PM CARES Fund had been allotted a government domain name, which can only be granted to government entities; however, they refused to disclose further information about the Fund, stating that it isn't available with them. In January 2021, a group of 100 retired Indian civil servants including A.S. Dulat (former head of the Research and Analysis Wing), K. Sujatha Rao (former Secretary, Family Health) and S. C. Behar, wrote to Prime Minister Modi, flagging concerns about the refusal to disclose information about the Fund under the Right to Information Act 2005.

In August 2020, petitions filed under the Right to Information Act 2005 to the Ministry of Labour concerning the allocation of funds for migrant laborers were denied, and the Ministry stated that the Fund was not a public authority and accordingly was not obliged to respond to the petition. A similar petition filed with the Chief Labour Commissioner received a response indicating that no funds had been earmarked for migrant labor as yet.

=== Exemption from audits ===
In April 2020, the Prime Minister's Office stated that PM CARES would not be audited by the Comptroller and Auditor General of India, since the PM CARES fund consisted of private donations and not public funds. Officials working with the Comptroller and Auditor General of India stated that they were not allowed to audit the fund, since it was "based on donations of individuals and organisations". The Prime Minister's National Relief Fund, although not officially audited by the Comptroller and Auditor General, has complied with audits questioning its spending, such as in the case of the 2013 Uttarakhand floods.

=== Private audits and issuance of receipts ===
In response to criticism concerning the lack of audits, accountability and transparency, the Government of India stated on 30 July 2020 that "independent auditors who will be appointed by the trustees" would audit the fund, and that such auditors would be appointed by the trustees of the Fund. The Government of India also agreed to start issuing receipts for donations.

In June 2020, a private firm of chartered accountants, SARC and Associates was reported to have been appointed as auditors for the PM CARES Fund for a period of three years. SARC and Associates has previously audited the PMNRF in 2019, replacing another private firm as its auditor. Sunil Kumar Gupta, the head of SARC and Associates, has acted as an advisor to several government entities in the past. The selection and appointment process for the private auditor has not been made public. Gupta has previously written a book about the government's 'Make in India' initiative, and has appeared on news channels Zee News and the state-owned Doordarshan TV to promote government programs.

=== Foreign donations ===
The PM CARES Fund is exempt from scrutiny and monitoring of all foreign donations, as the provisions of the Foreign Contribution (Regulation) Act have been exempted as far as the Fund is concerned. In April 2020, the Home Ministry of India declined to comment on a pledge of financial support to PM CARES from Russian state-owned defence company, Rosoboronexport, in response to concerns about the departure from India's prior policy of only accepting foreign donations from non-resident Indians, persons of Indian origin, and international organisations. In June 2020, Opposition leaders criticised the Government of India for accepting donations to the PM CARES Fund from Chinese-owned companies, in light of the 2020 China-India skirmishes and the Government of India's bans on Chinese products, including mobile applications. Punjab Chief Minister Amarinder Singh stated that Chinese donations accepted to the PM CARES Fund ought to be returned.

=== Fraudulent accounts ===
Immediately after the fund was created, multiple fake accounts were found in circulation. While the original UPI accounts were pmcares@sbi and pmcares@iob, Delhi Police booked an individual for creating a UPI account removing the 's' called pmcare@sbi, intended to scam people. The Press Bureau of India issued a clarification on twitter, confirming its donation information to ensure that funds were not donated to fraudulent accounts.

On 26 April 2020, police in Navi Mumbai registered a criminal case after a person provided funds via the PhonePe following a call soliciting donations to the PM CARES Fund. The call was alleged to be fraudulent.

== Litigation concerning the PM CARES Fund ==
=== Transparency and accountability ===
In August 2020, the Supreme Court of India rejected a petition filed by the Center for Public Interest Litigation, a non-profit organisation, which sought the transfer of funds from PM CARES to the National Disaster Response Fund, and refused to pass orders directing that the fund should be audited by the Comptroller and Auditor General of India. The Supreme Court held that the Government of India was free to make transfers between the two funds at its discretion. The Supreme Court also rejected a related plea calling on the Court to direct the Government of India to create a new national disaster relief plan to address the COVID-19 pandemic in India, finding the existing disaster relief plans to be sufficient. A review petition against this order is currently pending, as of October 2020.

The Supreme Court of India had previously dismissed a Public Interest Litigation (PIL) filed by Manohar Lal Sharma for questioning the legality of the constitution of PM CARES Fund for COVID-19, describing the petition as 'misconceived', in April 2020.

A number of petitions concerning the lack of transparency and accountability of the PM CARES Fund are pending in High Courts in India. On 14 May 2020, the Bombay High Court sought a response from the Government of India in response to a petition seeking a declaration of the amount of funds received by the PM CARES Fund, and calling on the government to publish details of funds received and spent on the PM CARES website. On 3 June 2020, the Nagpur Bench of the Bombay High Court issued notice to the Government of India in a petition seeking details of the amounts collected so far in the fund to fight COVID-19 pandemic and its audit processes, but later dismissed this petition. On 4 June 2020, the Delhi High Court heard a public interest petition filed, seeking to bring transparency to the PM CARES Fund by making the Right to Information Act 2005 applicable to it. On 10 June 2020, the Delhi High Court heard a petition filed by Samyak Gangwal, who challenged an order of the Prime Minister's Office refusing to disclose information about the establishment and governance of the Fund under the Right to Information Act 2005. The case is ongoing.

On 22 May 2020, Praveen Kumar, a lawyer in Bengaluru, filed a criminal complaint against Sonia Gandhi and other opposition leaders following tweets by them criticising the Fund on grounds of transparency and accountability. The criminal complaint was registered under provisions of the Indian Penal Code, including Section 153 (relating to provocations with the intent to cause riots) and Section 505(1)(b) (relating to the intent to cause fear or alarm in the public).

=== Challenges to mandatory donations ===
On 17 June 2020, the Delhi High Court dismissed an appeal from a Delhi University professor who challenged a mandatory deduction from his salary to the PM CARES Fund, referring to the petitioner as "stone-hearted". The petitioner had argued that the university ought to have taken the consent of its employees before making the deduction.

In October 2020, the Appellate Tribunal for Electricity modified one of its own orders requiring the payment of a fine to the PM CARES Fund, and allowed the fine to be paid to the National Disaster Response Fund instead. The petitioners in this case argued that as the Government of India itself had declared that the PM CARES Fund was not a government fund for the purpose of transparency, and had refused to allow it to be audited by the Comptroller and Auditor General (CAG), they could not be compelled to donate to it. The Tribunal accepted this argument.

== In popular culture ==
In September 2020, an anonymous user on the social news aggregation website, Reddit, purchased a domain name "pmcares.fund" and created a satirical browser game. The page displays browser game that involves a figure representing Prime Minister Narendra Modi overcoming several obstacles including the judiciary, media, and economy, and also an error message stating that details of the PM CARES Fund are unavailable because of the lack of government disclosures. The website gained wide attention on several social media platforms including Twitter and Facebook.

== See also ==
- Prime Minister's National Relief Fund
- COVID-Crypto Relief Fund
