= Prime Minister's Office (India) =

Office of the Prime minister of India

- Prime Minister's Office

- Screenshot showing the new PMO building / Seva Teerth complex from the official video uploaded on Narendra Modi Youtube channel

Agency overview
- Formed: 1977; 49 years ago
- Jurisdiction: Government of India
- Headquarters: New Delhi, Delhi, India
- Annual budget: ₹73.52 crore (US$7.9 million) (2026–27) (Note: Budgets of child agencies like Department of Atomic Energy (DAE), Department of Space (DoS), Performance Management Division (PMD), National Technical Research Organisation (NTRO) and National Security Council are not included.)
- Minister responsible: Narendra Modi, Prime Minister
- Deputy Minister responsible: Jitendra Singh, Minister of State in the Prime Minister's Office
- Agency executives: Pramod Kumar Mishra, IAS, Principal Secretary; Shaktikanta Das, IAS, Principal Secretary; Ajit Doval, IPS, National Security Advisor
- Child agencies: Cabinet Secretariat; National Security Council (NSC); National Technical Research Organisation (NTRO); Performance Management Division (PMD); Department of Atomic Energy (DAE); Department of Space (DoS); Ministry of Personnel, Public Grievances and Pensions
- Website: www.pmindia.gov.in

The Prime Minister's Office (IAST: Pradhānamantrī Kāryālaya) consists of the immediate staff of the Prime Minister of India, as well as multiple levels of support staff reporting to the Prime Minister. The PMO is headed by the Principal Secretary to the Prime Minister of India, currently Pramod Kumar Mishra. The PMO was originally called the Prime Minister's Secretariat until 1977, when it was renamed during the premiership of Morarji Desai. It is located in Seva Teerth, where it relocated to on February 13, 2026, from its previous location in the South Block of the Secretariat Building.

== History ==
During the tenure of Jawaharlal Nehru as the first Prime Minister of India, the then Prime Minister's Secretariat was headed by a Joint Secretary to Government of India until his death. The post of the Principal Secretary to Prime Minister was conceived during the tenure of Indira Gandhi as Prime Minister. The Principal Secretary to the PM is the head of the Prime Minister's Office.

== Function ==
The PMO provides secretarial assistance to the Prime Minister. It is headed by the Principal Secretary to the Prime Minister. The PMO includes the anti-corruption unit and the public wing dealing with grievances. The office houses the Prime Minister and few selected officers of Indian Civil Service who work with him to manage and coordinate government and his office. The Prime Minister through his office coordinates with all ministers in the central union cabinet, minister of independent charges and governors and ministers of state government. The PMO is located at Seva Teerth in New Delhi, having moved from the South Block of the Secretariat Building in February 2026.

The subject-matter of files required to be submitted to the Prime Minister depends on whether he is holding direct charge of the Ministry or whether there is a Cabinet Minister or Minister of State (Independent Charge) in charge of the Ministry. In the case of the latter, most matters are dealt with by the Cabinet Minister / Minister of State-in-charge. Only important policy issues, which the Minister concerned feels should be submitted to the Prime Minister for orders or information, are received in the PMO.

In cases where the Prime Minister is the Minister-in-charge, matters requiring Ministerial approval which are not delegated to the Minister of State/Deputy Minister, if any, are submitted for orders. The Prime Minister has traditionally been the Minister-in-charge of the Ministry of Personnel, Public Grievances and Pensions and the Departments of Space and Atomic Energy.

Some of the important matters that require the Prime Minister's personal attention include the following:

1. Important defence-related issues;
2. Decorations, both civilian and defence, where Presidential approval is required;
3. All important policy issues;
4. Proposals for appointment of Indian Heads of Missions abroad and requests for grant of agreement for foreign Heads of Missions posted to India;
5. All important decisions relating to the Cabinet Secretariat;
6. Appointments to State Administrative Tribunals and the Central Administrative Tribunal, UPSC, Election Commission, appointment of members of statutory/constitutional committees, commissions attached to various ministries;
7. All policy matters relating to the administration of the Indian Administrative Service and other civil services and administrative reforms; and
8. Special packages announced by the Prime Minister for states are monitored in the PMO and periodical reports submitted to Prime Minister.

=== Parliament Questions ===
Parliament Questions relating to the Ministries and Departments of which Prime Minister is the Minister-in-charge are answered by a Minister of State nominated for the purpose or by Prime Minister himself.

=== PM's Funds ===
The Prime Minister's National Relief Fund (PMNRF) and the National Defence Fund (NDF) are operated directly from the PMO. The Prime Minister's National Relief Fund was established in January 1948 as Trust, by then Prime Minister, Jawaharlal Nehru, with public contributions to assist displaced persons from Pakistan, due to partition of India. In the year 2013–2014, the Fund received donations worth ₹377.04 crore (equivalent to ₹657 crore or US$70 million in 2026).

== The Office ==
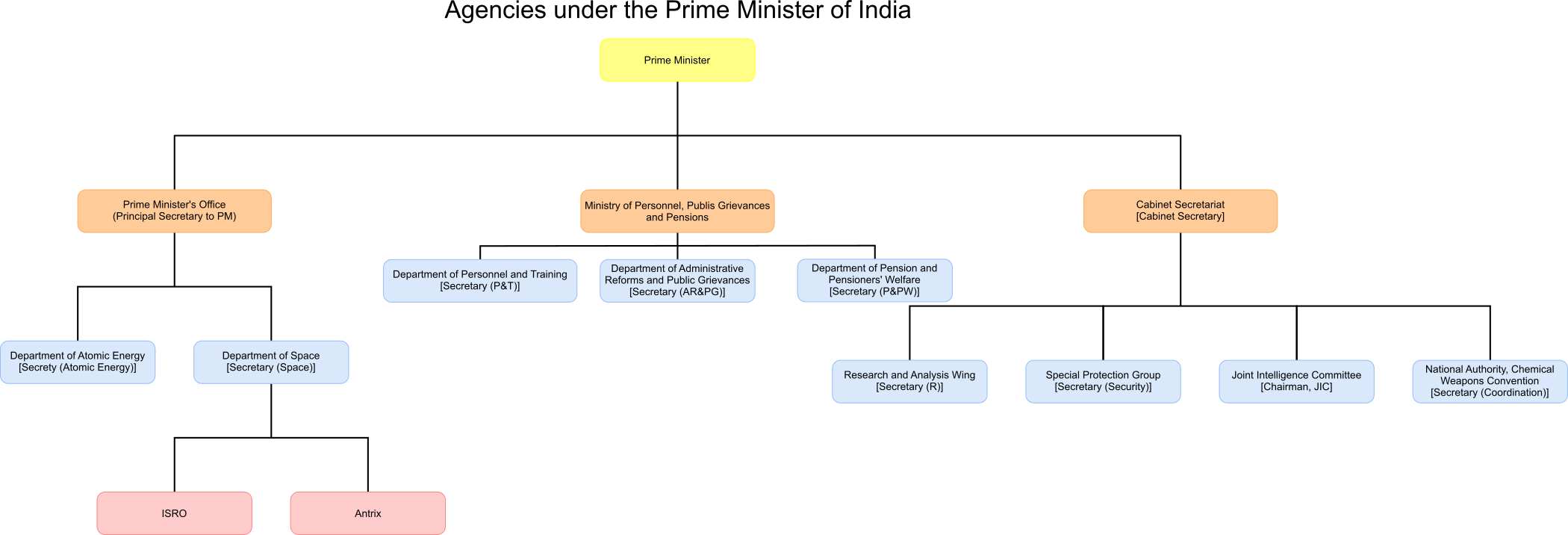
Agencies under the Prime Minister of India.

The Prime Minister's Office (PMO) located in South Block, overlooking the grandeur of Rashtrapati Bhawan. Though in the 1990s I.K. Gujral and some of his predecessors, used Prime Minister's Residence (PMR) spread over a 4-hectare complex as office.

== Current officials in the PMO ==
Official	Designation	Rank
Pramod Kumar Mishra, IAS	Principal Secretary to the Prime Minister of India	Cabinet Minister
Shaktikanta Das, IAS	Principal Secretary to the Prime Minister of India	Cabinet Minister
Ajit Kumar Doval, IPS, KC	National Security Adviser	Cabinet Minister
Tarun Kapoor, IAS	Advisor to the Prime Minister	Secretary to the Government of India
Ashish Vachhani, IAS	Additional Secretary, PMO	Additional Secretary to the Government of India
M. S. Srikar, IAS	Additional Secretary, PMO	Additional Secretary to the Government of India
Amit Singh Negi, IAS	Additional Secretary, PMO	Additional Secretary to the Government of India
Subhasish Panda, IAS	Additional Secretary, PMO	Additional Secretary to the Government of India
C. Sridhar, IAS	Additional Secretary, PMO	Additional Secretary to the Government of India
Yadav Manharsinh Laxmanbhai, IFS	Joint Secretary, PMO	Joint Secretary to the Government of India
Saurabh Shukla, IA&AS	Joint Secretary, PMO	Joint Secretary to the Government of India
Nidhi Tewari, IFS	Private Secretary to the Prime Minister	Joint Secretary to Government of India
Vivek Kumar, IFS	Private Secretary to the Prime Minister	Joint Secretary to Government of India
Hardik Shah, IAS	Private Secretary to the Prime Minister	Joint Secretary to Government of India

== Organisation ==
Prime Minister's Office
Prime Minister; Narendra Modi
Administration	National Security
Cabinet Secretariat Cabinet Secretary; T. V. Somanathan (IAS): R&AW / SPG / NACWC / SFF; Secretary (R); Parag Jain (IPS) / Director SPG; Alok Sharma (IPS) / Chairperson; Roli Singh (IAS) / Commander; Classified; Performance Management Division; Secretary; Prajapati Trivedi Ministry of Personnel, Public Grievances and Pensions Minister of State; Jitendra Singh Rana Departments: DoPT / / DARPG; Union Public Service Commission; Central Bureau of Investigation; Central Information Commission / / All India Services; Central Civil Services; Centralized Public Grievance Redress and Monitoring System	National Security Council Secretariat National Security Adviser; Ajit Doval: Strategic Policy Group / Indian Intelligence Community / National Security Advisory Board; Nuclear Command Authority Political Council; Chair: Prime Minister Executive Council; Chair: National Security Adviser Strategic Forces Command; Commander-in-Chief; Lt. Gen Dinesh Singh Rana Cabinet Committee on Security (CCS) Chairperson; Prime Minister; Narendra Modi: Defence Minister / Home Minister / National Security Adviser / External Affairs Minister / Finance Minister; Rajnath Singh / Amit Shah / Ajit Doval / S. Jaishankar / Nirmala Sitharaman
Science & Strategic Technology	Policy, Appointments & Economic Advisory
National Technical Research Organisation Chairman, NTRO; Rajesh Arya (IPS) Department of Atomic Energy (DAE) Secretary, DAE; Ajit Kumar Mohanty: BARC / IGCAR / NPCIL / AEC; Research & Development / Advanced Reactor Research / Nuclear Power Generation / Governing body of the DAE; Department of Space (DoS) Secretary, DoS; V. Narayanan: ISRO / SDSC-SHAR / IN-SPACe / NESAC; Space Missions / Primary Spaceport / Private Space Regulation / Northeast Regional Space Centre	NITI Aayog Chairperson; Prime Minister Vice Chairperson; Ashok Lahiri Appointments Committee of the Cabinet Chairperson; Prime Minister Member; Home Minister Economic Advisory Council to PM Chairperson; S. Mahendra Dev Members; Sanjay Kumar Mishra Sanjeev Sanyal Shamika Ravi
