= Moosa Raza =

Indian civil servant (1937–2024)

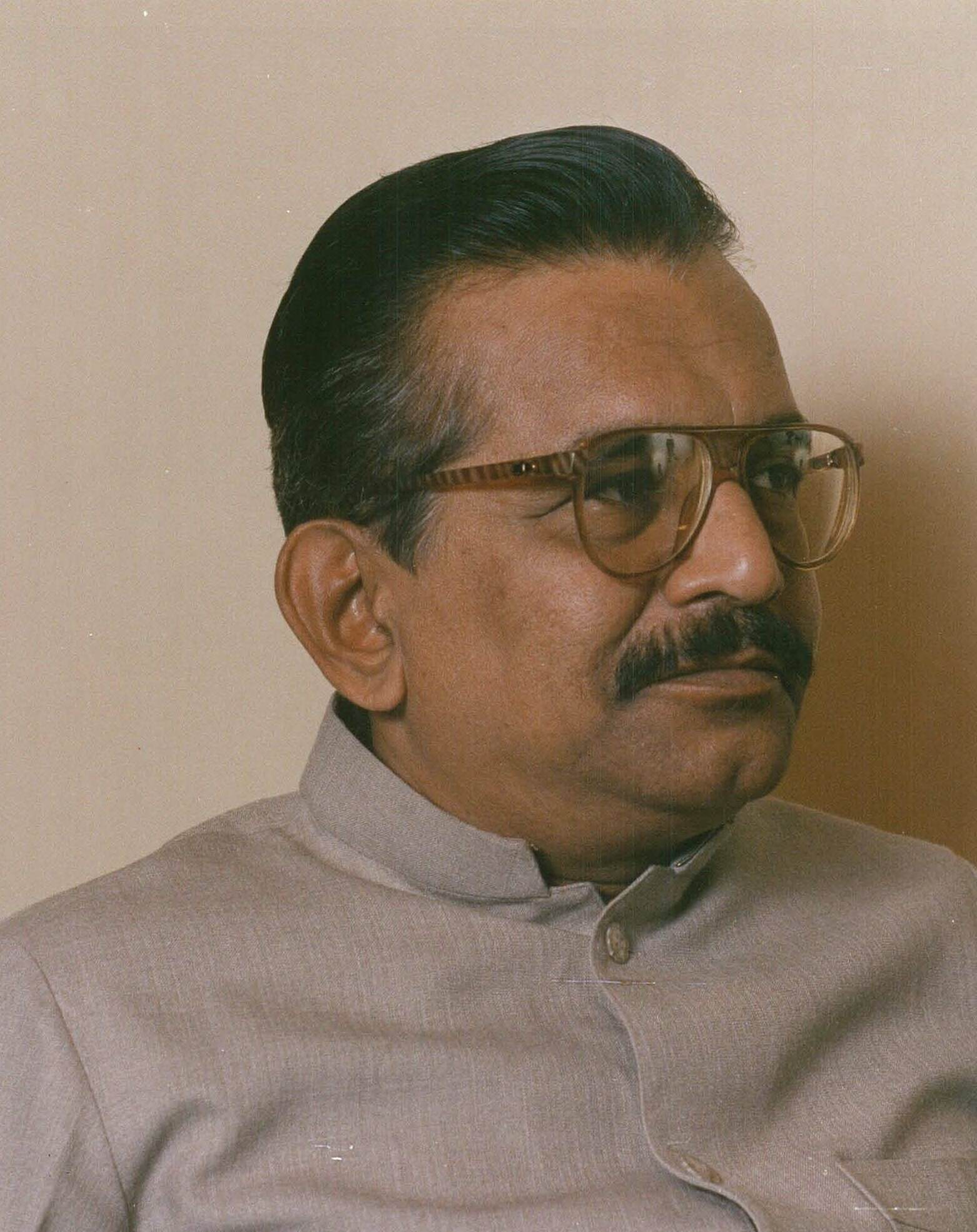
- Born: 27 February 1937; Meenambur, South Arcot District, Madras Presidency, British India
- Died: 8 May 2024 (aged 87); Chennai, Tamil Nadu, India
- Occupations: Civil servant, author
- Years active: 1958–2024
- Spouse: Husnara Raza
- Children: 4

Moosa Raza (27 February 1937 – 8 May 2024) was an Indian civil servant who was the chairman of the South Indian Educational Trust (S.I.E.T.), which runs six educational institutions; he was also chairman of the executive committee of Coastal Energen Pvt. Ltd. Raza has written a widely read book, Of Nawabs and Nightingales.

Moosa Raza had been awarded the Padma Bhushan for the year 2010. He joined the Indian Administrative Service in 1960 and rose to be the Principal Secretary to the Chief Minister of Gujarat. He then served as Chief Secretary of Jammu and Kashmir, Advisor to the Governor of Uttar Pradesh and, in Delhi, as Secretary to the Government of India in the Cabinet Secretariat and in the Ministry of Steel.

== Early life ==
Moosa Raza was born on 27 February 1937 in Meenambur, a small village located between Gingee and Villupuram in the Villupuram District in the State of Tamil Nadu, India to Ghulam Ali Mehkari and Aasiya Begum. His maternal ancestors hailed from a farming community and belonged to the Nawayath Clan of South India. His maternal grandfather was the village munsif (District Munsiff Court) and had a number of villages in the region under his stewardship. Moosa Raza studied in the local village school until the age of 8 studying Urdu & Arabic after which he moved to Chennai (Madras) along with his family. He studied in a local school called Madrasa-e-Azam and went on to complete his intermediate from the then Government Arts College (now called Quaid-E-Millath College) in 1955.

Raza graduated from the Madras Presidency College, (now called Presidency College, Chennai) University of Madras with Bachelor of Arts (Honours) degree in English Language and Literature, in 1958, getting a First Class First. During his days at the college, he won seven college medals, not only of his own department but also from the departments of History, Physics and Economics. He is the only triple gold medal winner from the University, a feat reported by unsurpassed till now. He went on to earn a master's degree from the same university.

He was known for his oratorical and debating talents during this time and was part of the quiz team, participating in and winning a number of college and inter-university competitions.

== Early career ==
In 1958, the then Vice-Chancellor, Sir Lakshman Swami Mudaliar appointed him as an Assistant Professor of English in the Presidency College, his alma mater. At the same time he prepared for the prestigious Indian Administrative Service examinations. He appeared for the selection exams in 1959 and was selected for the Indian Administrative Service for Gujarat (a state in India) in 1960, in the very first attempt.

== District administration career ==
Within just four years of service, Moosa Raza was posted in 1964 as Collector and District Magistrate in the district of the Banaskantha district in Gujarat, from where he later moved to Surendranagar district and then to Surat as District Collector. He was picked up by the then Finance Minister of India, Morarji Desai, to head his home District of Bulsar (Valsad) for four years. He was given charge of the flood relief operations in 1968 as the Municipal Commissioner when the city and the District of Surat was submerged due to heavy floods in the Tapti River.

In 1969 he was entrusted the onerous task of managing drought relief operations during the crippling famine and drought that struck Gujarat. As Director of Relief, Moosa Raza covered an area of over 50,000 kilometres, travelling by jeep, car, boats, on camel and on horseback. He was able to bring relief to over 12000 villages across Gujarat by way of providing government employment to over 1.5 million villagers, water to over 7500 villages and cattle feed to save the lives of over 3 million milch cattle, the livelihood of the rural communities in Gujarat.

In 1975, he was appointed the Principal Secretary to the Chief Minister of Gujarat, Madhavsinh Solanki. In 1998, when the state of Jammu and Kashmir was facing severe turbulence, he was appointed Chief Secretary of Jammu and Kashmir where he helped in controlling the incipient militancy and implementing welfare measures for the State.

== Public sector undertakings ==
For a major part of his career Moosa Raza functioned as chairman & managing director of several prestigious industrial and commercial enterprises both at the State and Central levels.

Raza was the youngest Indian Administrative Officer to head the National Textiles Corporation, which then managed over 110 nationalised textile mills with an employment of over 200,000 workers. As managing director, he helped turn the corporation from a loss making concern into a profitable one and helping save the jobs of over 200,000 workers and 25,000 officers.

Later as chairman and managing director of Gujarat State Fertilizers Company Ltd., the largest integrated Chemical & Fertilizer Complex of the country, Moosa Raza helped in giving fillip to the industrialisation of Gujarat State. For seven continuous years under his stewardship, the Gujarat State Fertilizer Company won the National Awards for best productivity, safety and industrial relations. Concurrently, he functioned as the chairman and managing director of the Calico group of Industries, a private sector undertaking under the control of the State Bank of India.

Raza served as chairman and managing director of India Trade Promotion Organization, a government body engaged in the promotion of India's domestic and international trade. He also functioned as a director on several PSUs, including Cotton Corporation of India, Gujarat Fisheries Corporation, Marine Products Export Development Authority, Gujarat Narmada Fertilizer Company, etc. Most of the institutions were made to turn the corner during his tenure.

In the wake of the demolition of the Babri Masjid, Moosa Raza was sent as an Advisor to the Governor of Uttar Pradesh where during his tenure, he helped in controlling the law and order situation. Later as Secretary to the Government of India in the Cabinet Secretariat in the Steel Ministry. He formulated numerous proposals and policies to liberalise the steel industry of India and set it on the path of expansion and modernisation. He retired from government service in 1995 after 35 years of service as Secretary to the Government of India having served in that position in both the Cabinet Secretariat and the Ministry of Steel.

== Post IAS career ==
After retiring from active government service, Moosa Raza served on several Committees of State and Central Governments, the private sector as well as charity and non-profit organisations. For five years, he served as the chairman of the Iridium India Telecom Co., and also on the Board of Iridium International at Washington.

Raza was a member of the National Integration Council of India headed by the Prime Minister of India for several years. He was chairman of the committee appointed by the Government of J & K to recommend measures to devolve power to the people and control corruption. He also served on the Government Committee to review the POTA cases in Jammu & Kashmir and Gujarat as well as the Task Force on Socio-Economic development of J & K headed by the Chief Economic Advisor to the Prime Minister. He was a member of the Arjun Sen Gupta Committee to review reforms in the Public Sector of India. He was also the Convenor of the MOU Task Force for Mining & Mineral Industries of Government of India as also for the Transport Industries Syndicate of Government of India.

Moosa Raza had been recently nominated as an ATF member in the Performance Management Division of the Cabinet Secretariat set up by the Prime Minister of India for evaluating performance of Government Departments and Ministries. He is currently a member of the Committee of SCOPE & Ministry of Public Enterprises for awarding Excellence Awards to the PSUs headed by Justice P.N. Bhagwati, former Chief Justice of India.

The National Minorities Commission of India had asked him to lead a delegation of Muslim Clerics and leaders to negotiate with the Hurriyat leaders and Government of J & K for the honourable return of Kashmiri Pandits to the valley.

Moosa Raza was nominated as the President's nominee on the Senior Selection Committee of Indira Gandhi Open University, and since 2009 has been on the Court of Aligarh Muslim University. Since 2000, he has also been functioning as the chairman of Southern India Education Trust, a minority promoted institution which is running a college for women, two high schools, a centre for women's studies, a centre for dyslexic children etc. More than 50% of the 9,000 students of these institutions belong to the majority community.

In view of his long experience with industrial and commercial enterprises, Raza was elected and served as chairman of the Standing Conference of Public Enterprises, an apex body of over 240 public sector undertakings in India. Moosa Raza also functioned during this period on the governing councils of the Indian Institute of Management (Ahmedabad), the Advanced Management Programme Committee, the Management and Administrative Research Council of India, International Management Institute, New Delhi, and the various expert committees to study public sector reforms and government functioning.

== Social work ==
Raza was the Founder Trustee of the India Islamic Cultural Centre, New Delhi, and as its director general he helped set it up as an institution for establishing communal harmony and build understanding between various communities of India. He was a Member of Sarvodayan international, Tamil Nadu Chapter, Chennai and a Member of the National Council for Promotion of Urdu Language.

== Personal life and death ==
Raza was married to Husnara and had one son and three daughters. Raza died on 8 May 2024, at the age of 87.

== Other interests ==
Apart from his hands on experience in managing large enterprises, Moosa Raza had been intimately concerned with theories of management and governance, study of comparative religion, Islamic and Indian history, philosophy and law and has written several articles on these subjects. Extensively read in European and Indian history and Sufism, Raza had a deep knowledge of human motivation, ethos and culture of both the West and the East.

Raza delivered lectures in Chicago, at the Nehru Centre in London and in Dubai, Heidelberg, Germany besides other centres in India.

Raza owned a personal library of over 10,000 books, over 7,000 of which are on Islam. He had delivered lectures on the Bhagavad Gita, the Upanishads, Christianity, Buddhism and Sufism.

Raza travelled widely both within the country and outside. He led several delegations abroad on behalf of the Government, both diplomatic and commercial, and went out on speaking assignments on management, country analysis, human resources development, corporate restructuring, project management and related fields. He was also deeply involved in many educational activities, especially for the deprived sections of society and minorities.

== Honours ==
Raza was conferred the prestigious award of Padma Bhushan in the Republic Day Honours in 2010. During the course of his services, he has been awarded the President’s Silver medal, the Shiromani Award, the Indira Priyadarshini Award, the Jewel of India Award, the Pride of India award and several other awards.

== Literary work ==
Moosa Raza authored a book titled “of Nawabs and Nightingales” which is a collection of his early experiences in the Indian Administrative Service. His book was very favourably reviewed by the noted author, Khushwant Singh in newspapers and magazines. His book In Search of Oneness published in 2012 is a free flowing narrative about the author's journey in search of a personal God and faith. Drawing from religious sources like the Bhagavad Gita, the Quran and sufi writing by authors like Abdurrahman Chishti, Ibn Arabi, Rumi, Abdul Qadir Gilani and others, the author has highlighted the commonality of religions. Moosa Raza has also published a collection of his Urdu poems under the title "Khwab-e-Natamaam" (Incomplete Dreams). Kashmir; Land of regrets published in 2019 is a recounting by the author of his tenure as the Chief Secretary to the then state of Jammu and Kashmir in the tumultuous years leading up to the famous Kidnapping of Rubaiya Sayeed. Moosa Raza published his memoirs titled Of Giants and Windmills in the year 2022 which traces his journey from a remote village in South India to his role as chairman of the South Indian Educational Trust.

== Bibliography ==
- Of Nawabs and Nightingales & Other Stories (1995, Rupa & Co); ISBN 978-8171672998
- In Search of Oneness: The Bhagvad Gita and the Quran through Sufi Eyes (2012, Penguin Ananda); ISBN 978-0143417835
- The Smile on Sorrow's Lips: Selected Verses from Ghalib's Persian Poems with Urdu and English Poetic Translations (2015, CreateSpace Independent Publishing); ISBN 978-1508936312
- Kashmir: Land of Regrets (2019, Westland Publications); ISBN 978-9388689946
- Kashmir Sarzameen e Pashemani (2021, Brown Books); ISBN 978-81-952657-8-7
- Juniper Cottage and Other Stories (2021, Vitasta Publishing); ISBN 978-9390961511
- Of Giants and Windmills: An Autobiography (2022, Niyogi Books India); ISBN 978-9391125325
