= Prajapati Trivedi =

Indian economist (born 1953)

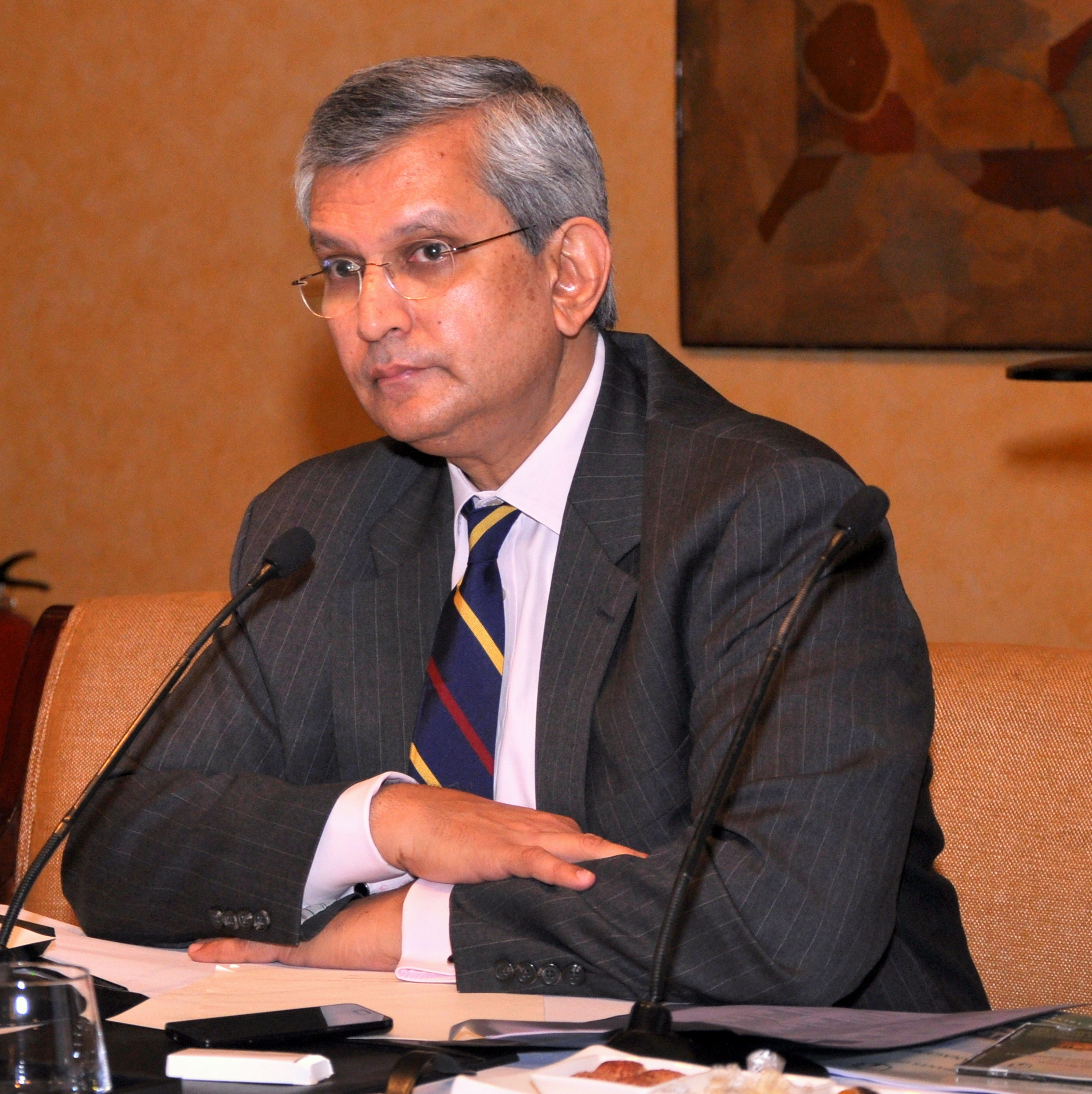
- Trivedi in 2013

Secretary, Performance Management, Cabinet Secretariat
- In office 2 January 2009 – 8 August 2014
- Preceded by: Position established
- Succeeded by: SB Agnihotri

Chairman, National Authority Chemical Weapons Convention, Cabinet Secretariat
- In office 2 January 2009 – 8 August 2014
- Preceded by: Renuka Viswanathan
- Succeeded by: Gurdial Singh Sandhu

Personal details
- Born: 9 August 1953 (age 73)
- Spouse: Supreeti Trivedi
- Education: St. Stephens College; London School of Economics; Boston University
- Occupation: Economist, writer and administrator

Prajapati Trivedi (born August 9, 1953) is an Indian economist.

== Career ==
Prajapati Trivedi is a Distinguished Professor at the Management Development Institute (MDI), Gurgaon, India.

He is on the boards of the Institute of Studies in Industrial Development (ISID), New Delhi, Indian Trust for Rural Heritage and Development (ITRHD), and School of Management, IILM University, Gurgaon.

Till recently he was the Commonwealth Secretary General's Special Envoy for SDG Implementation, Commonwealth Secretariat, London, UK.

In addition, he is a visiting fellow at the IBM Center for The Business of Government, Washington, DC, and visiting Economics Faculty at the Harvard Kennedy School of Government, Harvard University. Until January 2018, he was the Senior Fellow (Governance) and Adjunct Professor of Public Policy and Faculty Chair for the Management Programme in Public Policy (MPPP) at the Indian School of Business.

He previously served as a Secretary to the Government of India. In January 2009, he was appointed as the first Secretary of Performance Management. Based in the Cabinet Secretariat with the responsibility of managing government performance, he reviewed and reported to the Cabinet Secretary/Prime Minister on the performance of all government departments. He also headed the National Authority for the Chemical Weapons Convention as its chairman. Trivedi worked for fourteen years (1994-2009) as a Senior Economist for the World Bank in Washington, DC, before joining the Government of India in 2009. He was previously Economic Adviser to the Government of India from 1992 to 1994.

In 2017 he became the first Indian to receive the International Public Administration Award given by the American Society for Public Administration for contributing significantly to the field of public administration as a scholar and practitioner.

He is also the first Indian to be elected a life-time Fellow of the National Academy of Public Administration (NAPA), Washington, DC

On March 11, 2019, Prof. Trivedi was awarded the Harry Hatry Distinguished Performance Management Practice Award for 2019 in Washington, DC. This award is presented each year by the Center for Accountability and Performance (CAP) and the American Society for Public Administration (ASPA). The Hatry Award is presented to an individual whose outstanding teaching, education, training, and consultation in performance management have made a significant contribution to the practice of public administration.

== Books written by Trivedi ==
Trivedi has authored the following books:

- Applied Microeconomics for Public Policy Makers – A Provisional Text (1991) International Management Publisher, India

This book is a guided tour through an economist's workshop, introducing readers to various microeconomic concepts and their utility in analyzing economic problems. However, unlike many textbooks, this book does not present microeconomics as just one thing after another. The choice of topics was guided by one over-riding criterion: Whether the concept included in the book is useful for understanding or analyzing economic policies, in general, and public policies, in particular.

For every concept included, this book answers the following questions: (a) Why do we need the concept? (b) What is it all about? (c) How can it be used? (d) What are its limitations?

This book differs from other microeconomics texts in another more fundamental way. Each policy is analyzed primarily from the 'public' perspective rather than 'private' perspective. That is, it focuses on 'costs' and 'benefits' from the society's point of view rather than an individual's point of view. It does not, however, supplant the private perspective, rather, it supplements it. This book has emerged from the author's lecture notes, which have been used for more than four decades at several workshops (e.g., Public Enterprise Workshop and Budget Workshop) organized by the erstwhile Harvard Institute for International Development (HIID) and the Mid-Career Masters Programme in Public Administration (MPA) at the Harvard Kennedy School of Government, Harvard University. In addition, this book has been used in training programs at the World Bank. Lal Bahadur Shastri National Academy of Public Administration, and in regular courses taught at leading universities in the United States, India and Singapore.

- How to Implement Privatization Transactions – A Manual for Practitioners Rutledge Books, US, ISBN 1582440492, 2000

This book is one of the first such practical toolkits for privatization written in the early 90s. This book demystifies the process of implementing privatization transactions and shares international experience in privatization implementation. It is a practical guide that informs the reader in simple, non-ideological, and clear terms of the various steps in implementing a privatization decision. The focus is on the "how to" aspects of implementing privatization rather than the "why to" side of the privatization debate.

This book: (a) Provides an overall understanding of the privatization process; (b) Assists in the planning the logistics to implement the privatization decisions; (c) Facilitates in the implementation of the privatization transaction; (d) Guides in the supervision of consultants (financial advisors) recruited to implement the privatization transaction; (e) Improves the design of privatization policies by painting a realistic picture of the implementation phase.

This manual for practitioners will be useful to policymakers responsible for implementing privatization transactions, those attending or running training programs on privatization, and those who serve as privatization consultants and advisors on both sides of the privatization transaction.

"How to Implement Privatization Transactions" is also replete with ready-made tools for speedy implementation of a privatization transaction.

Examples of these tools include the following:

- Sample forms and tables which as be adapted for use in most privatization transactions.
- Sample outlines and documents which offer samples of real-life, best practice documents used in various countries.
- Sample advertisements can be most helpful in kicking off a fast-track implementation program.
- Memorandum of Understanding – An Approach to Improving Public Enterprise Performance

International Management Publisher, India (ISBN 81900140005), 1990

The Memorandum of Understanding (MOU) is a major policy initiative of the Indian Government towards its public enterprises. Currently more than 100 of the largest public enterprises, accounting for approximately 95 percent of the total public sector turnover in India, sign MOUs with the Government. The concept of the MOU is very straightforward. Essentially, it is a contract between the Government and a public enterprise in which the two parties come to a mutual understanding regarding the targets to be fulfilled by the public enterprise and the corresponding obligations of the Government which are considered essential to ensure the fulfillment of these targets. It is also referred to as Performance Contract, performance Agreement, Contratos de Rendemientos, etc. in different parts of the world. There is tremendous misunderstanding regarding this important subject. A major reason for this lack of public discussion is the fact that there is hardly any material available on MOUs. This book was the first of its kind on this important subject. It brings together a rare collection of reading dealing with the international experience with MOUs.

The book is divided into seven sections. The first one presents an overview of the conceptual and empirical issues relating to MOUs. The subsequent sections deal with the experience of MOU type approaches in France, Senegal, Pakistan, Korea and Bangladesh. The last section documents the Indian experience with regard to the design and implementation of MOUs.

- A Critique of Public Enterprise Policy, International Management Publisher, India ISBN 81900140007. 1992

This book contains a collection of original papers written and published by Professor Prajapati Trivedi on various aspects of public enterprise management and policy. While the book is centered around the Indian public enterprise policy, the issues (problems and solutions) discussed in the book are truly transcendental in their relevance. Policy makers from other countries have found it equally relevant to their context. The distinguishing feature of this book is a common framework for analyzing various aspects of public enterprise policy. This approach allows the reader to see the interrelationships between them and is also designed to public policies that are consistent with each other.

The unifying conceptual framework used in the book has come to be known as the Signaling System Approach. According to this framework, the root cause of most of the problems associated with public enterprises can be traced to the fact that they are confronted with multiple principals who have multiple goals, which are often conflicting. The book describes various approaches to managing public enterprises and designing public policies, given this background. The book contains nine sections dealing with the following areas of public enterprise policy:

1. Origins of Public Enterprises
2. Performance Evaluation of Public Enterprises
3. Comparative Performance of Public and Private Enterprises
4. Institutional Arrangements for Managing Public Enterprises
5. Performance Information Systems for Public Enterprises
6. Public Enterprise Pricing Policies
7. Expert Committees on Public Enterprises
8. Issues Relating to Motivation (incentives) in Public Enterprises
9. Privatization of Public Enterprises

This book combines public enterprise theory as well as practical insights regarding the design and implementation of public enterprise policy. It is an essential reading for all students of public enterprise management and policy.

- Performance Management in Government – A Primer for Leaders. Commonwealth Secretariat, London

Governments are complex, multi-layered organisations and, not surprisingly, government effectiveness and efficiency have many dimensions. However, the diversity that exists among nations and their governments tends to obscure three key facts. First, many of the problems involved in managing government are a result of a few underlying causes. Second, the underlying causes of poor government performance are similar in nature across a diverse set of countries. Third, countries have successfully dealt with these (few) underlying causes using remarkably similar approaches. Viewed in this light, the challenge of government performance management appears more manageable.

Written succinctly in non-technical language, this book is meant to help government leaders identify the underlying causes of poor government performance and then apply proven strategies to fix these. The book cautions Government leaders against the natural temptation to cure the symptoms - this approach represents a temporary solution at best, and the list of symptoms can be too large to fix. Fixing underlying causes, on the other hand, provides a more sustainable long-term solution.

- Performance Related Pay – A Primer on 7th Pay Commission. Indian School of Business, Mohali, December 2015

This book fills a perceived glaring void in the availability of information on the key building blocks for the Seventh pay Commission recommendations on Performance Related Pay (PRP). It brings together in one place all relevant information for making an informed decision about the merits of the Seventh Pay Commission recommendations on PRP.

The three building blocks for the recommendations for the PRP are: Results-Framework Document (RFD), Performance-Related Incentive Scheme (PRIS) and Annual Performance Appraisal Report (APAR). It is hard to fully appreciate the recommendations of the Seventh Pay Commission without a solid understanding of these three distinct though interrelated concepts. This Primer includes three sections giving details of these concepts. These sections are designed to be self-contained essays and can be read individually.
