= Performance Management Division =

Government of India Performance Management Division (PMD)
- Emblem of India

Agency overview
- Jurisdiction: Government of India
- Headquarters: Cabinet Secretariat, Rashtrapati Bhavan, New Delhi
- Agency executives: T. V. Somanathan, Cabinet Secretary; Dr Prajapati Trivedi, Secretary Performance Management
- Website: performance.gov.in

The Performance Management Division, Cabinet Secretariat was set up by the Government of India in January 2009. The Division was established with a view to assess the effectiveness of Government Departments in their mandated functions. Reporting to the Cabinet Secretary, Dr Prajapati Trivedi was made the first secretary, Performance Management with a mandate to roll out the PMES. In the year 2013 (fourth year of implementation) the system extends to 80 Departments/Ministries with around 800 responsibility centres (autonomous organizations / subordinate offices/ attached offices).

== Background ==
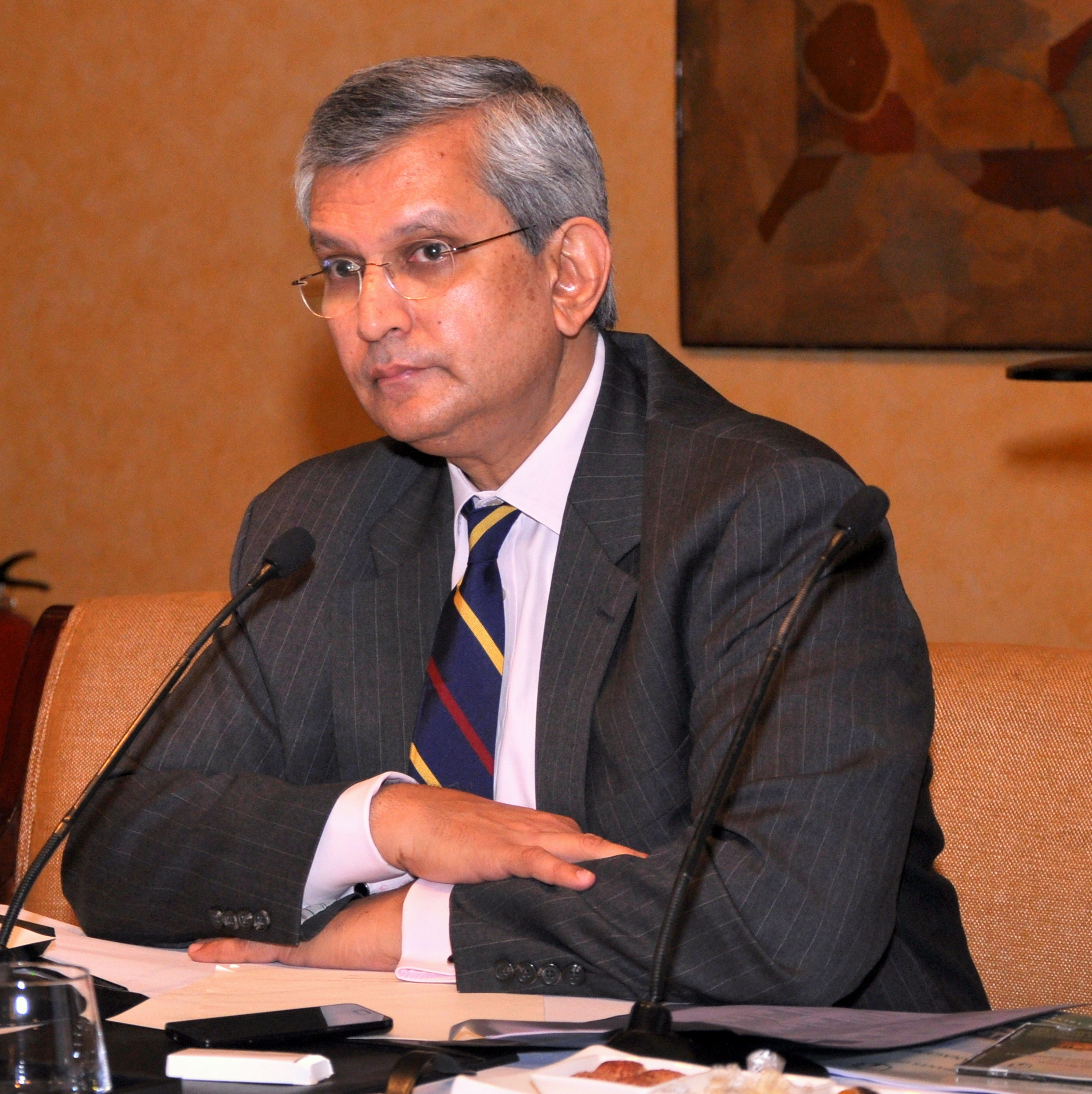
Dr Trivedi appointed the first Secretary Performance Management in 2009

In the Joint Session of Parliament held on 4 June 2009, the then President of India Pratibha Devisingh Patil had outlined 13 important measures to be initiated by the Government of India in the next hundred days. ‘’Establishing Mechanism for performance monitoring and performance evaluation in Government on a regular basis ‘’ was one of the measures to be initiated by the Government. This was followed by the approval of an outline of a Performance Monitoring and Evaluation System (PMES) for Government Departments by the Prime Minister on September 11, 2009.

== Working ==
The PMES system was established with a view to assess the effectiveness of Government Departments in their mandated functions which involves the preparation of a Results Framework Document (RFD) by each department every year, highlighting its objectives and priorities for the financial year against pre specified targets at the end of the year.

== RFD(Results Framework Document) ==
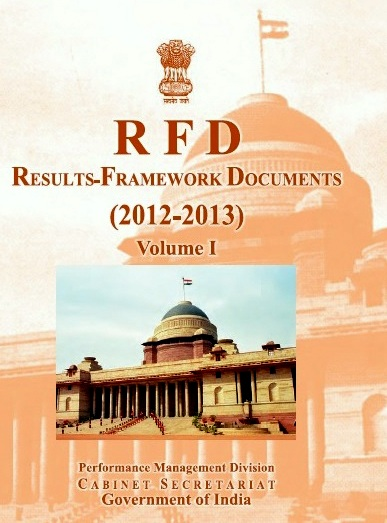
Sample cover for RFD 2012-13

A Results-Framework Document (RFD) is a PMES tool, documenting a record of understanding between a Minister representing the people's mandate, and the Secretary of a department responsible for implementing this mandate.

In its fifth round of implementation, i.e. 2013, the division has made public five compendiums having RFDs of different Departments/Ministries

- RFD compendium 2013-14
- RFD compendium 2012-13
- RFD compendium 2011-12
- RFD compendium 2010-11
- RFD compendium 2009-10

== See also ==
- Cabinet Secretariat, Government of India
