= National Authority for Chemical Weapons Convention =

- Emblem of India

Agency overview
- Formed: 13 June 2005; 21 years ago
- Jurisdiction: Government of India
- Headquarters: National Authority Chemical Weapons Convention (NACWC), First Floor, Chanakya Bhawan, Chanakyapuri, New Delhi - 110021
- Agency executive: Roli Singh, IAS, Chairperson
- Parent agency: Cabinet Secretariat
- Website: https://nacwc.nic.in/, https://nacwc.gov.in/

National Authority for Chemical Weapons Convention or NACWC is an office in Cabinet Secretariat, Government of India, established on 29 April 1997 by a resolution of the Cabinet and was later accorded a statutory status through Chemical Weapons Convention Act, 2000.
