= State Emblem of India (Prohibition of Improper Use) Act, 2005 =

2005 Act of the Parliament of India

Parliament of India
- Long title: An Act to prohibit the improper use of State Emblem of India for professional and commercial purposes and for matters connected therewith or incidental thereto.
- Citation: Act No. 50 of 2005
- Enacted by: Parliament of India
- Assented to: 20 December 2005
- Status: In force

The State Emblem of India (Prohibition of Improper Use) Act, 2005 is an Act of Parliament of India which regulates the improper or commercial usage of the Emblem of India.

== Emblem ==
The emblem of India is an adaptation of the Lion Capital of Ashoka at Sarnath. The emblem consists of three lions, the fourth being hidden from view. The Ashoka Chakra (wheel) appears in relief in the center of the abacus, with a bull on the right and a galloping horse on the left, and outlines of Dharma Chakras on the extreme right and left. Forming an integral part of the emblem is the motto inscribed below the abacus in Devanagari script: Satyameva jayate सत्यमेव जयते (English: Truth Alone Triumphs). This is a quote from Mundaka Upanishad, the concluding part of the sacred Hindu Vedas. This national emblem was adopted on 26 January 1950, the day that India became a republic.

== Prohibitions ==
- No person can use the emblem or any imitation in a manner so as to create an impression that it is associated with or an official document of the Central Government or State Government, as the case may be, without permission of the appropriate government.
- No person can use the emblem for commercial purpose or as a part of patent title, trademark or design except in cases as specified by the Central Government.
- Registration of intellectual property containing the emblem is prohibited.
- The Central Government has the power to regulate and make rules for proper usage of the emblem.

== Consequences ==
- Creation of a false impression of association with Government is punishable with imprisonment for a term which may extend to two years, or with fine which may extend to five thousand rupees, or with both or in case of a subsequent offence, with imprisonment for a term which shall not be less than six months, which may extend to two years and with fine which may extend to five thousand rupees.
- Commercial usage of the emblem is punishable with imprisonment for a term which shall not be less than six months, which may extend to two years and with fine which may extend to five thousand rupees.

== Usage ==
- The official seal shall have the Emblem enclosed in an oval or a round frame, with the name of the ministry or department written within the frame.
- State Government can use the Emblem or a part of it after taking permission from the Central Government.
- The Emblem can be displayed on important government buildings like Rashtrapati Bhawan, Parliament House, Supreme Court and Central Secretariat, Raj Bhavan or Raj Niwas and State Legislature, High Courts and Secretariat buildings of the States or the Union territories, premises of India’s Diplomatic Mission abroad, Indian consulates abroad.
- Emblem cannot be used by former functionaries of the Government, Commission or Committee, Public Sector Undertaking, Bank, Municipal Council, Panchayat Raj Institution, Parishad, non-government organisation, University.
- The State Emblem of India (Regulation of Use) Rules, 2007 lays down the persons who can use the Emblem in official stationery, on cars, etc.
