= Cabinet Secretariat (India) =

Department responsible for the administration of the Government of India

- Mantrimanḍala Sacivālaya
- Branch of Government of India

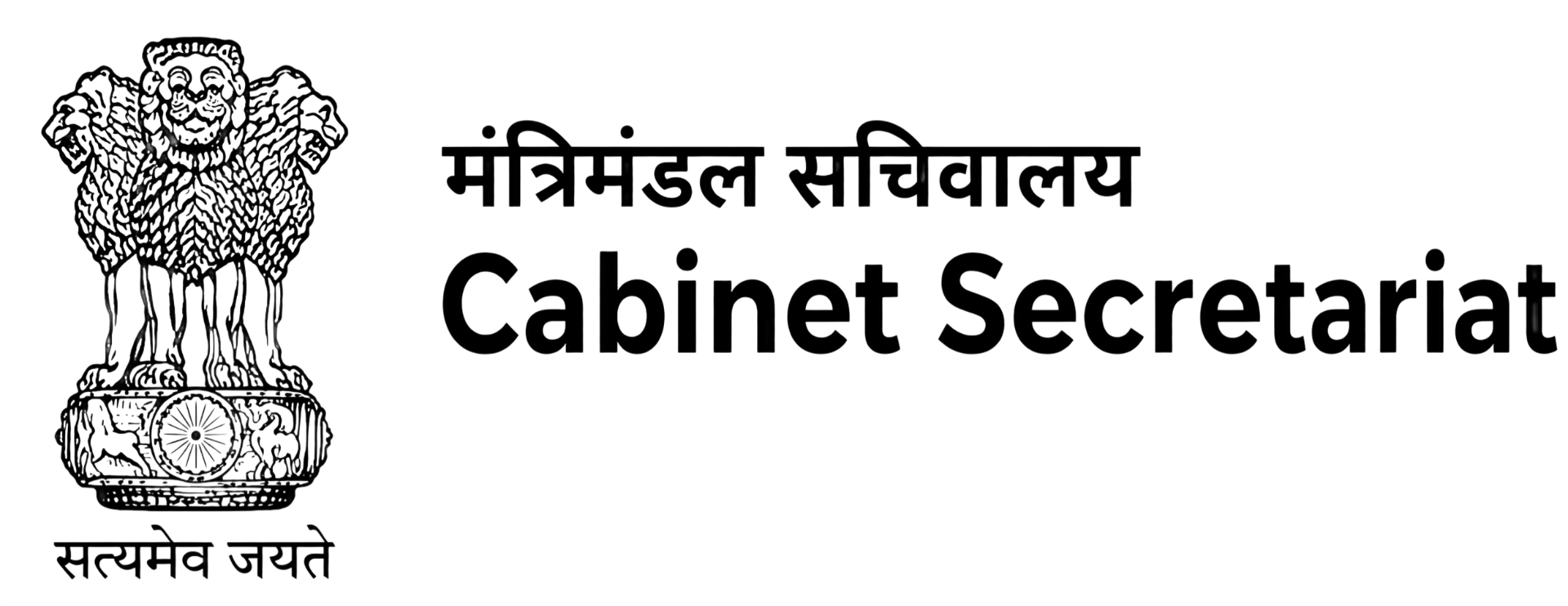
- Cabinet Secretariat of the Republic of India

- The new building of the Cabinet Secretariat – Seva Teerth.

Secretariat overview
- Formed: 5 September 1946 (79 years ago)
- Preceding Secretariat: Secretariat of the Executive Council of the Governor-General
- Jurisdiction: Republic of India
- Headquarters: Seva Teerth New Delhi, Delhi, India; 28°36′52″N 77°11′59″E
- Motto: (Hindi: नागरिक देवो भव) transl. The Citizen is akin to God
- Employees: 921 (2016 est.)
- Annual budget: ₹1,102 crore (US$110 million) (2026–27)
- Minister responsible: Narendra Modi, Prime Minister of India
- Secretariat executive: T.V. Somanathan, IAS, Cabinet Secretary of India
- Parent department: Prime Minister's Office (PMO)
- Child agencies: Research and Analysis Wing (R&AW); Special Protection Group (SPG); National Authority for Chemical Weapons Convention (NACWC); Special Frontier Force (SFF)
- Website: https://cabsec.gov.in/

The Cabinet Secretariat (IAST: Mantrimanḍala Sacivālaya) is the apex administrative body of the Government of India. It provides secretarial assistance to the Union Council of Ministers and facilitates smooth transaction of business between the Ministries/Departments and other statutory, constitutional bodies of the Government. The Cabinet Secretariat also manage the major crisis and national security threats of India. The Cabinet Secretariat comes under the charge of the Prime Minister of India and is headed by the Cabinet Secretary.

Since its creation, it has functioned from the Rashtrapati Bhavan on Raisina Hill in New Delhi. In September 2025, the office was shifted to its new building named Seva Teerth in the Executive Enclave, that was developed under the Central Vista Redevelopment Project.

== History ==
During the British Raj, government business was disposed of by the Council of the Governor General of India. The council functioned as a Joint Consultative Board. The Governor-General of India's secretary was designated Secretary to the Executive Council. With the Interim Government of India being formed in 1946, the Secretariat of the Executive Council was designated as Cabinet Secretariat and the Secretary to the Executive Council re-designated Cabinet Secretary.

== Overview ==
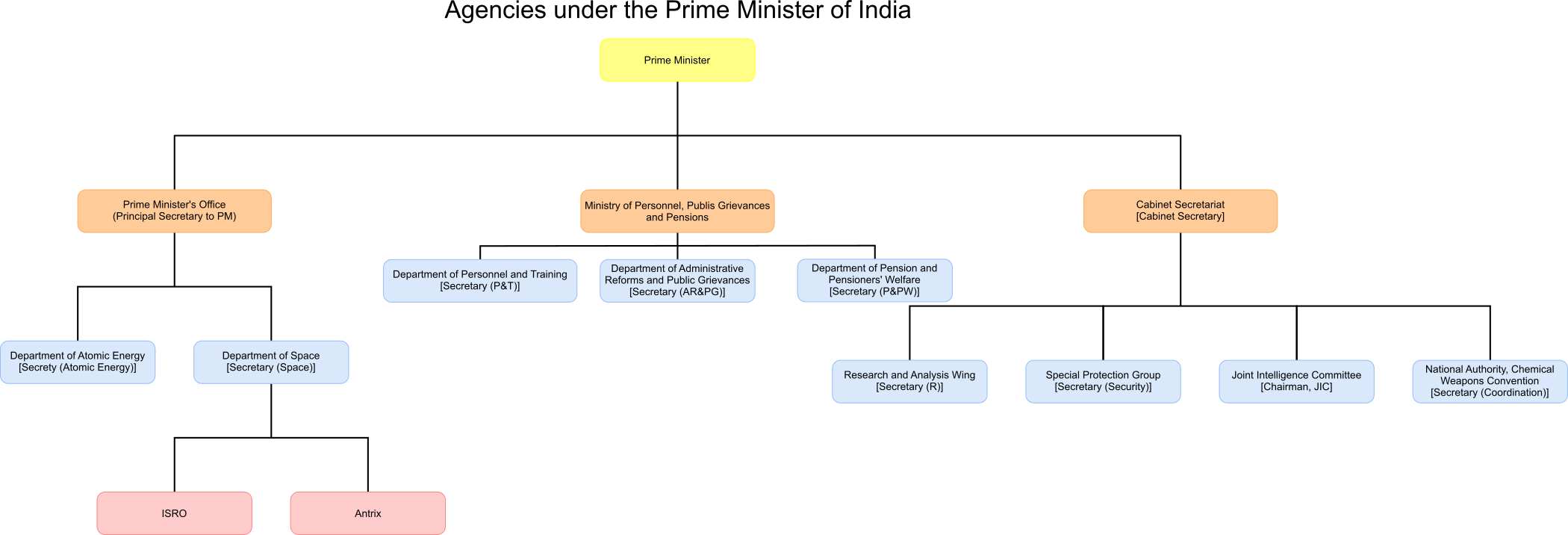
Agencies under the Prime Minister of India.

The Cabinet Secretariat is responsible for the administration of the Government of India (Transaction of Business) Rules, 1961 and the Government of India (Allocation of Business) Rules 1961, facilitating a smooth transaction of business in Ministries/ Departments of the Government by ensuring adherence to these rules. The Secretariat assists in decision-making in Government by ensuring Inter-Ministerial coordination, ironing out differences amongst Ministries/ Departments and evolving consensus through the instrumentality of the standing/ad hoc Committees of Secretaries. Through this mechanism new policy initiatives are also promoted.

== Organisation ==
Cabinet Secretariat is organised as follows: Secretary (Coordination), Secretary (S) (under whom comes the Special Protection Group) and Secretary (R) (heads Research and Analysis Wing;). Chairperson (National Authority for Chemical Weapons Convention), NIC Cell, The Directorate of Public Grievances, Direct Benefits Transfer (DBT) Mission, Vigilance & Complaints Cell (VCC) is also under the Cabinet Secretariat.

=== Cabinet Secretary ===
The Cabinet Secretary is the ex-officio head of the Civil Services Board, the Cabinet Secretariat, the Indian Administrative Service (IAS) and head of all civil services under the rules of business of the Government.

The Cabinet Secretary is generally the senior-most officer of the Indian Administrative Service. The Cabinet Secretary ranks 11th on the Indian Order of Precedence. The Cabinet Secretary is under the direct charge of the prime minister. Though there is no fixed tenure, the office-bearer's tenure can be extended.

Before the adoption of the portfolio system in the Government of India, all governmental business was disposed of by the Governor-General-in Council (earlier name of Cabinet Secretariat), the Council functioning as a joint consultative board. As the amount and complexity of business of the Government increased, the work of the various departments was distributed amongst the members of the council: only the more important cases were dealt with by the Governor-General or the Council collectively.

This procedure was legalised by the Indian Councils Act 1861, during the time of Lord Canning, leading to the introduction of the portfolio system and the inception of the Executive Council of the Governor-General. The Secretariat of the Executive Council was headed by the Cabinet Secretary.

The constitution of the Interim Government in September 1946 brought a change in the name, though little in functions, of this Office. The Executive Council's Secretariat was then designated as the Cabinet Secretariat. It seems, however, at least in retrospect, that Independence brought some change in the functions of the Cabinet Secretariat. It no longer remained concerned with only the passive work of circulating papers to Ministers and Ministries, but instead developed into an organisation for effecting coordination between the Ministries.

Cabinet Secretary
T. V. Somanathan (IAS)
R&AW	SPG	NACWC	SFF
Secretary (R); Parag Jain (IPS)	Secretary (S); Rajiv Singh (IPS), Director of SPG; Alok Sharma (IPS)	Chairperson; Roli Singh (IAS)	Commander; Classified

=== Prime minister ===
The Cabinet Secretariat is under the direct charge of the prime minister. When any policy is made in the Cabinet Secretariat there must be signature of prime minister and Cabinet Secretary of India. The prime minister of India is the head of the Union Government, as distinct from the president of India, who is the head of state. Since India has parliamentary system of constitutional democracy, it is the prime minister who oversees the day-to-day functioning of the Union Government of India.

The prime minister is assisted in this task by his Council of Ministers, comprising Cabinet Ministers, Ministers of State with Independent Charge, Ministers of State who work with Cabinet Ministers, and deputy ministers.

=== Project Monitoring Group ===
In June 2013, a cell within the Cabinet Secretariat called the Project Monitoring Group was created to track stalled investment projects, both in the public and private sectors and to remove the implementation bottlenecks in these projects on a fast-track basis. An online portal open to the public was created where projects worth over ₹1,000 crore (US$100 million) were to be tracked.

The Project Monitoring Group was moved to the Prime Minister's Office in 2014.

== See also ==
- Rashtrapati Bhavan
- Kartavya Bhavan
- Rajpath
