= Prime Minister's National Relief Fund =

Indian disaster relief fund

The Prime Minister's National Relief Fund (PMNRF) in India is the fund raised to provide support for people affected by natural and man-made disasters. Natural disasters covered under this include floods, cyclones, earthquakes, etc. Man-made disasters include major accidents, acid attacks, riots, etc. The fund is also allotted to the people for treatment like cancer, kidney transplantation, heart surgery, etc. The fund was first consolidated during the time of the first prime minister of the Republic of India, Jawaharlal Nehru.

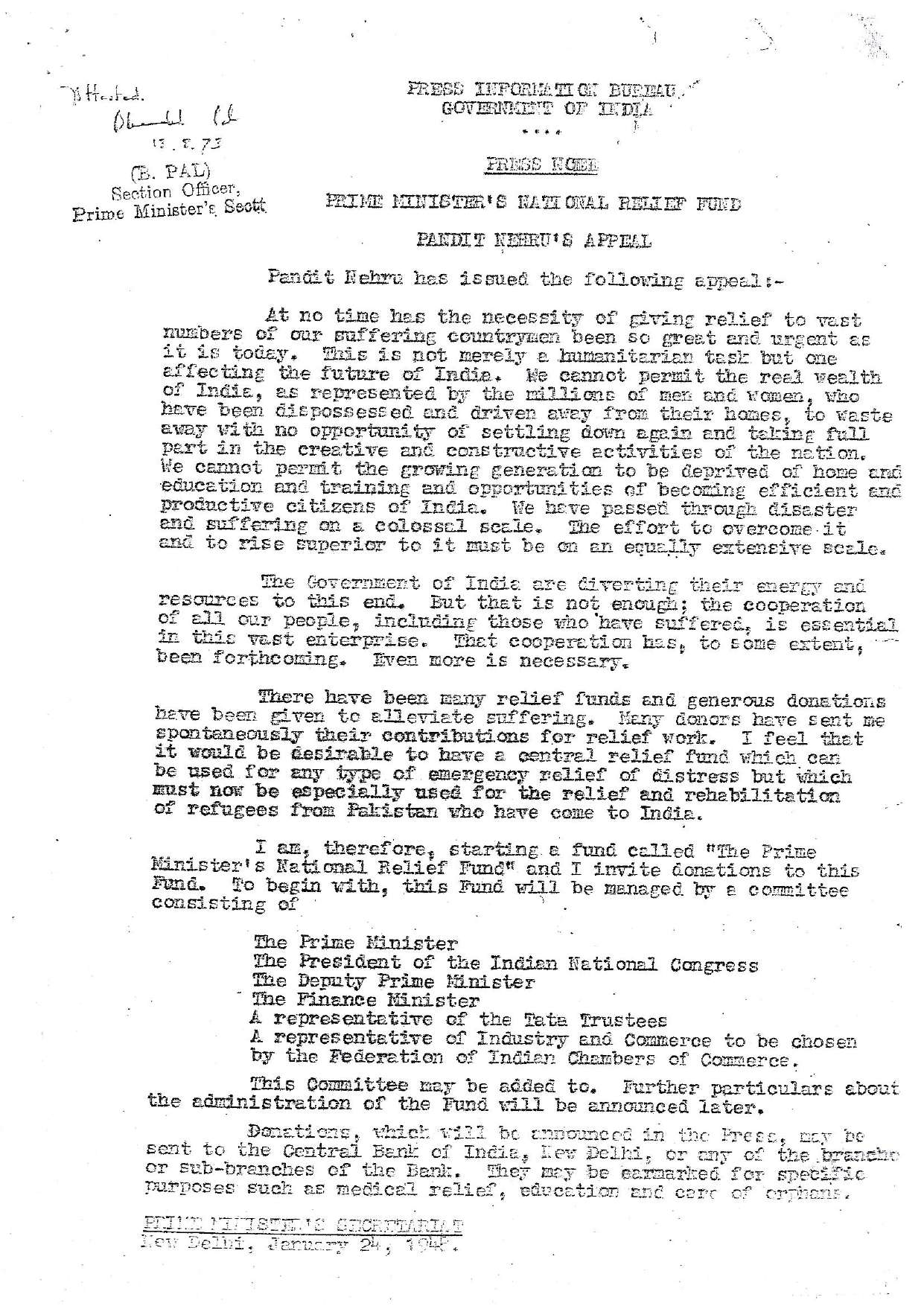
Appeal by the then Prime Minister, Pt. Jawaharlal Nehru in January 1948 to help people displaced from the partition of India. The Prime Minister’s National Relief Fund (PMNRF) was established with public contributions post this appeal

== History ==
Partition of British India occurred in 1947 along with the formation of two dominions called Pakistan and India. Partition resulted in mass violence and people were moving across borders in all means. Thus to support the displaced people from Pakistan Jawaharlal Nehru created a fund collected from the public in January 1948.

== Implementation ==
The fund is fully collected from the public and has no budgetary allocation from the government. The fund collected is exempted from income tax to drive more people into the initiative. Chairman of the fund is the Prime Minister and he is assisted by joint secretary. The whole of the fund is deposited with scheduled commercial banks and the beneficiaries are identified directly by the Prime Minister from among the beneficiaries.

The control of the PMNRF has been with the Prime Ministers Office (PMO) since 1985. PMO holds the complete authority of the fund. The President of Congress is not a member of PMNRF anymore despite assertions made by certain public figures.

== Impact ==
The fund was used extensively to provide support for victims of Uttarakhand flood 2013, cyclone in Kerala and Lakshadweep, 2014 violence in Assam, Madhya Pradesh explosion 2015, Tamil Nadu floods 2015 etc.

== Projects in Progress Or Recently Completed ==
- Construction Of Cyclone Shelters In West Bengal _{[Completed]}

In West Bengal's North 24 Parganas, South 24 Parganas, and Purba Medinipur districts, 50 multipurpose cyclone shelters are to be built, with a budget of Rs. 138.65 crore approved from the Prime Minister's National Relief Fund. After construction was finished, the 50 cyclone shelters were turned over to the West Bengal state government and local government.

- Construction Of Cyclone Shelters In Kerala And Lakshadweep

From the Prime Minister's National Relief Fund, the construction of one multipurpose cyclone shelter each in Kerala and Lakshdweep was approved. At a cost of Rs. 2.24 crore, the construction of the first cyclone shelter in Vadakara, Kerala, has been finished and turned over to the local government. The first cyclone shelter in Minicoy Island, Lakshadweep is currently being built. Rs. 3.37 crore has been approved as the cost of this cyclone shelter.

- Projects Related To Floods In Jammu & Kashmir In 2014
1. Replacement of damaged text books: Schoolchildren received 1,18,500 sets of textbooks as replacements for any damaged copies. Additionally, 180 textbook sets were donated to 5 Kendriya Vidyalayas and 3 Jawahar Navodaya Vidyalayas. The project was executed by the School Education Department of the J&K government. The project came with a 4.08 crore rupee price tag.
2. Replacement of damaged medical equipments in six hospitals of Srinagar, Leh and Jammu: Implementing agency is NDMA. The Jammu & Kashmir government, in cooperation with NDMA, directly purchased 71 medical equipment items, while M/S HLL Lifecare Ltd. obtained 217 items for the organization. There are Rs. 142.15 crore in total project costs.
3. Reconstruction of damages houses: Rebuilding completely damaged pucca and kutcha dwellings had a sanction rate of Rs. 1 lakh and Rs. 50,000/-per house, respectively. The rebuilding costs for severely damaged pucca and kutcha dwellings were Rs. 50,000 and Rs. 10,000, respectively. The cost of rebuilding partially damaged pucca and kutcha dwellings was Rs. 25,000 and Rs. 5,000, respectively. Reconstruction of 21,088 entirely destroyed Pucca and Kutch homes and 1,97,652 severely and partially damaged Pucca and Kutcha dwellings will cost a total of Rs. 565 crore.
4. Procurement of blankets: 01 lakh blankets were purchased at a cost of Rs. 5 crore and distributed to J&K residents affected by flooding.

== Income and expenditure ==
The income and expenditure of the PMNRF for the period 2009-10 to 2018-19 is as follows (in crore rupees):

Year	Receipts	Expenditure	Balance	Ref
2009-10	185.06	143.90	1652.78	2009-10
2010-11	155.19	182.33	1625.64	2010-11
2011-12	200.79	128.43	1698.00	2011-12
2012-13	211.42	181.62	1727.80	2012-13
2013-14	577.19	293.62	2011.37	2013-14
2014-15	870.93	372.29	2510.02	2014-15
2015-16	751.74	624.74	2637.03	2015-16
2016-17	491.42	204.49	2923.96	2016-17
2017-18	486.65	180.85	3229.76	2017-18
2018-19	783.18	212.50	3800.44	2018-19
