= State Emblem of India =

- Armiger: Republic of India
- Adopted: 26 January 1950 (76 years ago)
- Shield: Lion Capital of Ashoka
- Motto: Satyameva Jayate: "Truth Alone Triumphs", from the "Mundaka Upanishad", a part of Upanishads
- Use: National Emblem of India and official documents, currency & passports.

The State Emblem of India is the national emblem of the Republic of India and is used by the union government, many state governments, and other government agencies. The emblem is an adaptation of the Lion Capital of Ashoka, an ancient sculpture dating back to 280 BCE during the Maurya Empire. The statue is a three dimensional emblem showing four lions. It became the emblem of the Dominion of India in December 1947, and later the emblem of the Republic of India. The State Emblem of India is an official seal of the Government of India. It is used as the national emblem of India and appears on official documents, currency and passports.

The emblem was adopted by the Government of India on 26 January 1950, the day that India became a republic. It is based on the Lion Capital of Ashoka, a sculpture that was originally erected at the Sarnath, a place where Gautama Buddha first taught the Dharma, now in Uttar Pradesh, India. The emblem features four Asiatic lions standing back to back, symbolizing power, courage, confidence and faith. The lions are mounted on a circular abacus and the abacus is mounted on a lotus. The wheel of the law, Dharmachakra, is in the centre of the abacus. The wheel has 24 spokes, which symbolize the progress and evolution of human civilization.

The motto, Satyamēva Jayatē (transl. Truth Alone Triumphs) is inscribed below the abacus in Devanagari. The use of the emblem is governed by the State Emblem of India (Prohibition of Improper Use) Act, 2005 and the State Emblem of India (Regulation of Use) Rules, 2007.

The State Emblem of India is used by the Government of India and its agencies, as well as by all state governments and union territory administrations in India. It is also used by private citizens in India on letterheads, business cards and other personal uses, but with certain restrictions. The emblem is protected under the Indian Emblem Act and its use without proper authority is punishable under the law.

== History ==
Following the end of British rule on 15-August-1947, the newly independent Dominion of India adopted an official state emblem on 30-December-1947. The emblem consisted of a representation of the Lion Capital of Ashoka at Sarnath enclosed within a rectangular frame. The task of beautifying the original manuscript of the Constitution of India was given to Nandalal Bose (then the Principal of Kala Bhavan, Santiniketan) by the Indian National Congress. Bose set out to complete this task with the help of his students, one of whom was Dinanath Bhargava, then 21 years old. Bose was keen to include the Lion Capital of Ashoka into the opening pages of the constitution. Wanting the lions to be depicted realistically, he chose Bhargava who studied the behaviour of the lions at the Kolkata Zoo.

On 26 January 1950, a representation of the Lion Capital of Ashoka placed above the motto, Satyameva Jayate, was adopted as the State Emblem of India.

== Usage and description ==
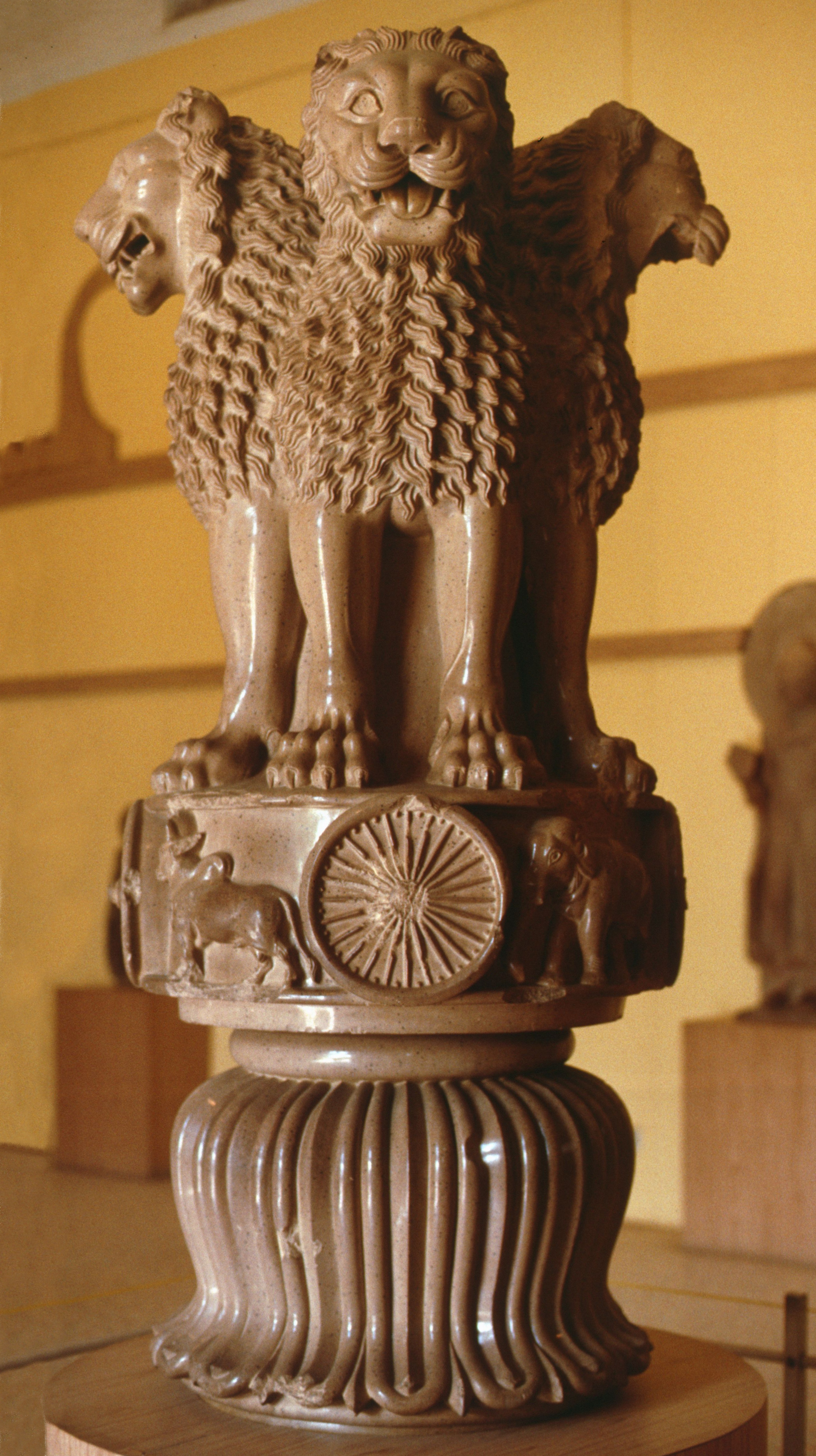
The original Lion Capital of Ashoka, 3rd century BCE, Sarnath Museum

The emblem forms a part of the official letterhead of the Government of India and appears on all Indian currency as well. It also functions as the national emblem of India in many places and appears prominently on Indian passports. Usage of the emblem is regulated and restricted under State Emblem of India (Prohibition of Improper Use) Act, 2005, under which no individual or private organisation is permitted to use the emblem for official correspondence. The Ashoka Chakra (Ashoka wheel) on its base features in the centre of the National Flag of India.

The actual Sarnath capital features four Asiatic lions standing back to back, symbolising power, courage, confidence and pride, mounted on a circular base. At the bottom is a horse and a bull, and at its centre is a Dharma chakra. The abacus is girded with a frieze of sculptures in high relief of The Lion of the North, The Horse of the West, The Bull of the South and The Elephant of the East, separated by intervening wheels, over a lotus in full bloom, exemplifying the fountainhead of life and creative inspiration. Carved from a single block of sandstone, the polished capital is crowned by the Wheel of Dharma.

In the emblem finally adopted, only three lions are visible, the fourth being hidden from view. The wheel appears in relief in the centre of the abacus, with a bull on the right and a galloping horse on the left, and outlines of Dharma Chakras on the extreme right and left. A horse and a bull are represented right below the abacus. The bull represents hard work and steadfastness, while the horse represents loyalty, speed, and energy. The bell-shaped lotus beneath the abacus has been omitted.

Forming an integral part of the emblem is the motto inscribed below the abacus in Devanagari script: Satyameva Jayate (Sanskrit: सत्यमेव जयते; translation: "Truth Alone Triumphs"). This is a quote from the Mundaka Upanishad, the concluding part of the sacred Hindu Vedas.

== Emblems of National Bodies ==
Emblem of the Central Bureau of Investigation

== Use on Buildings ==
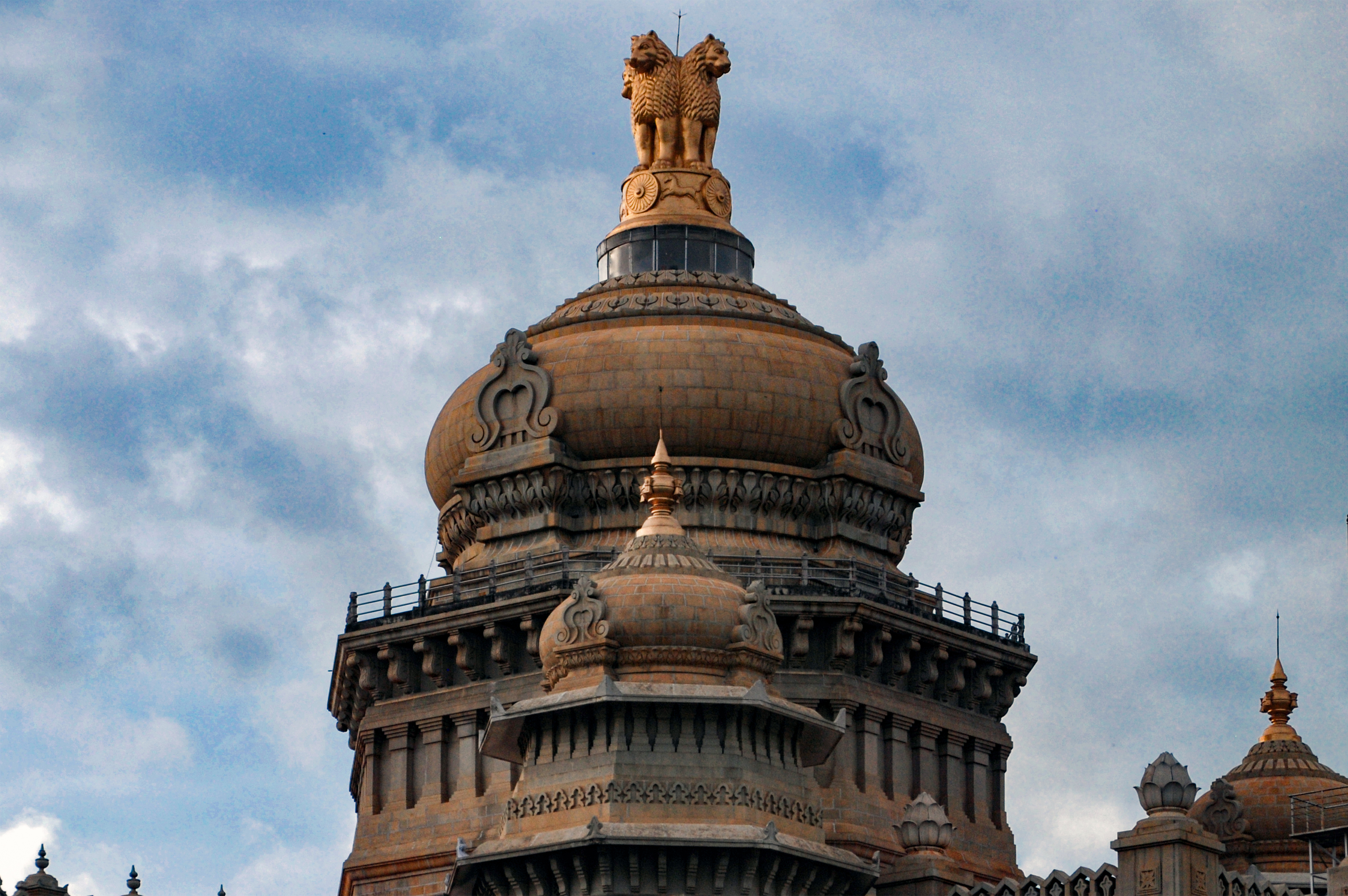
The State Emblem atop the dome of Vidhana Soudha, seat of the state legislature of Karnataka

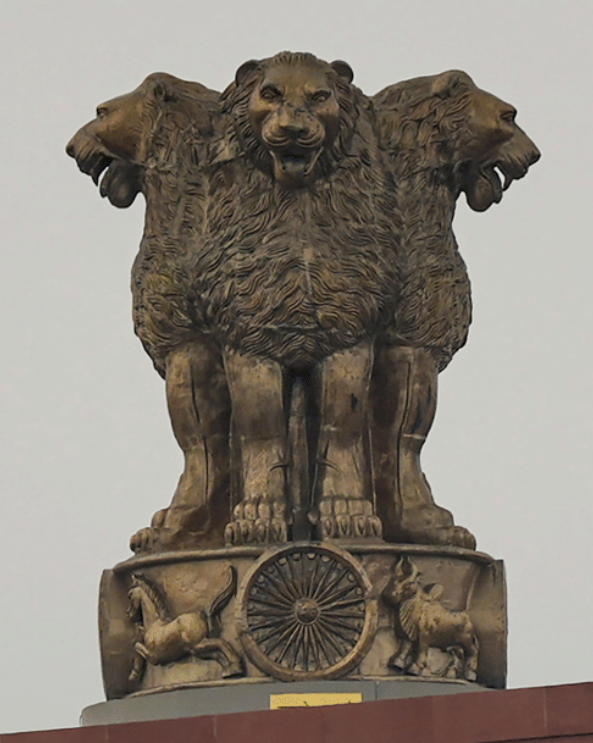
The State Emblem atop the new Parliament Building of India

== Emblems of States and Union Territories ==
Most of the states and union territories of India have adopted their own state emblem, seal or coat of arms which are used as an official governmental symbol, while six states and five union territories use the National Emblem of India with a text legend as their official governmental seal.

Some of the autonomous district councils established by the Sixth Schedule of the Constitution of India have also adopted an official emblem.

== Historic Seals and Emblems ==
=== Medieval Period in India ===
==== Pandya Dynasty ====
Medieval royal insignia of the Pandya dynasty

==== Vijayanagara Empire ====
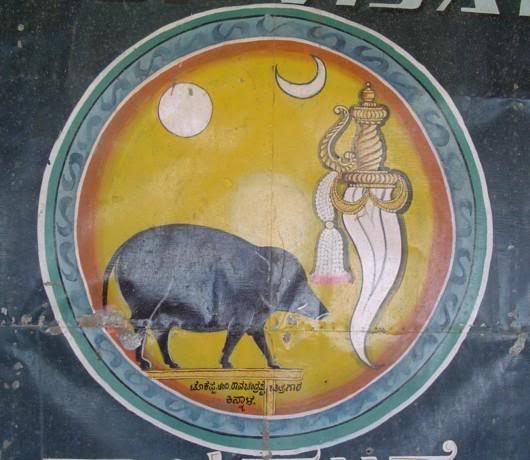
Emblem of the Vijayanagara Empire

==== Ahom Kingdom ====
Insignia of the Ahom kingdom

=== Early modern era in India ===
==== Mughal Empire ====
Imperial Seal of the Mughal Empire

==== Maratha Empire ====
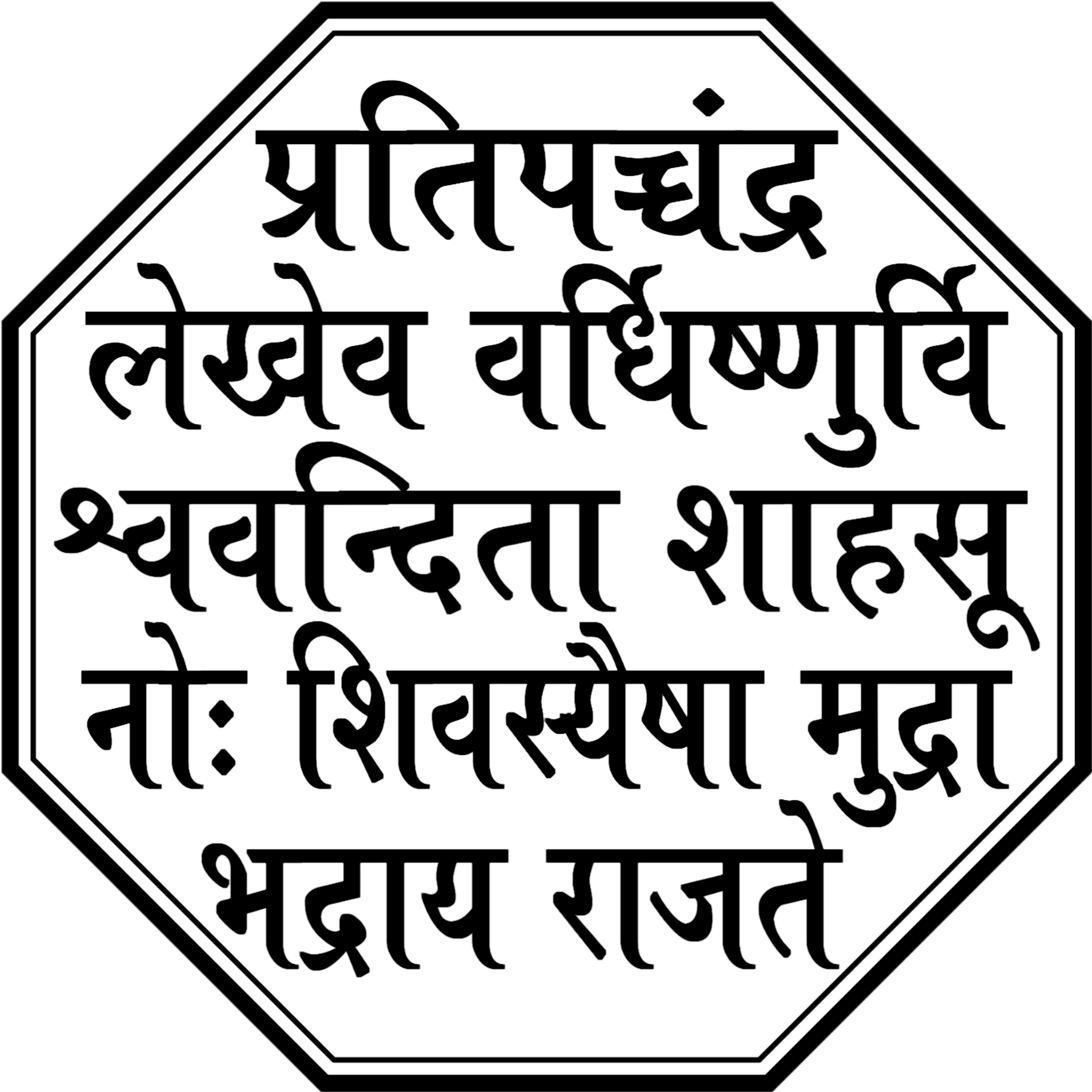
Seal of Shivajiraje Bhonsle I, 1st Chhatrapati of the Maratha Empire

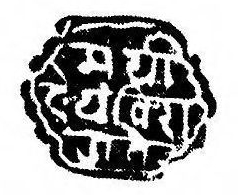
Closing Seal of Shivajiraje Bhonsle I

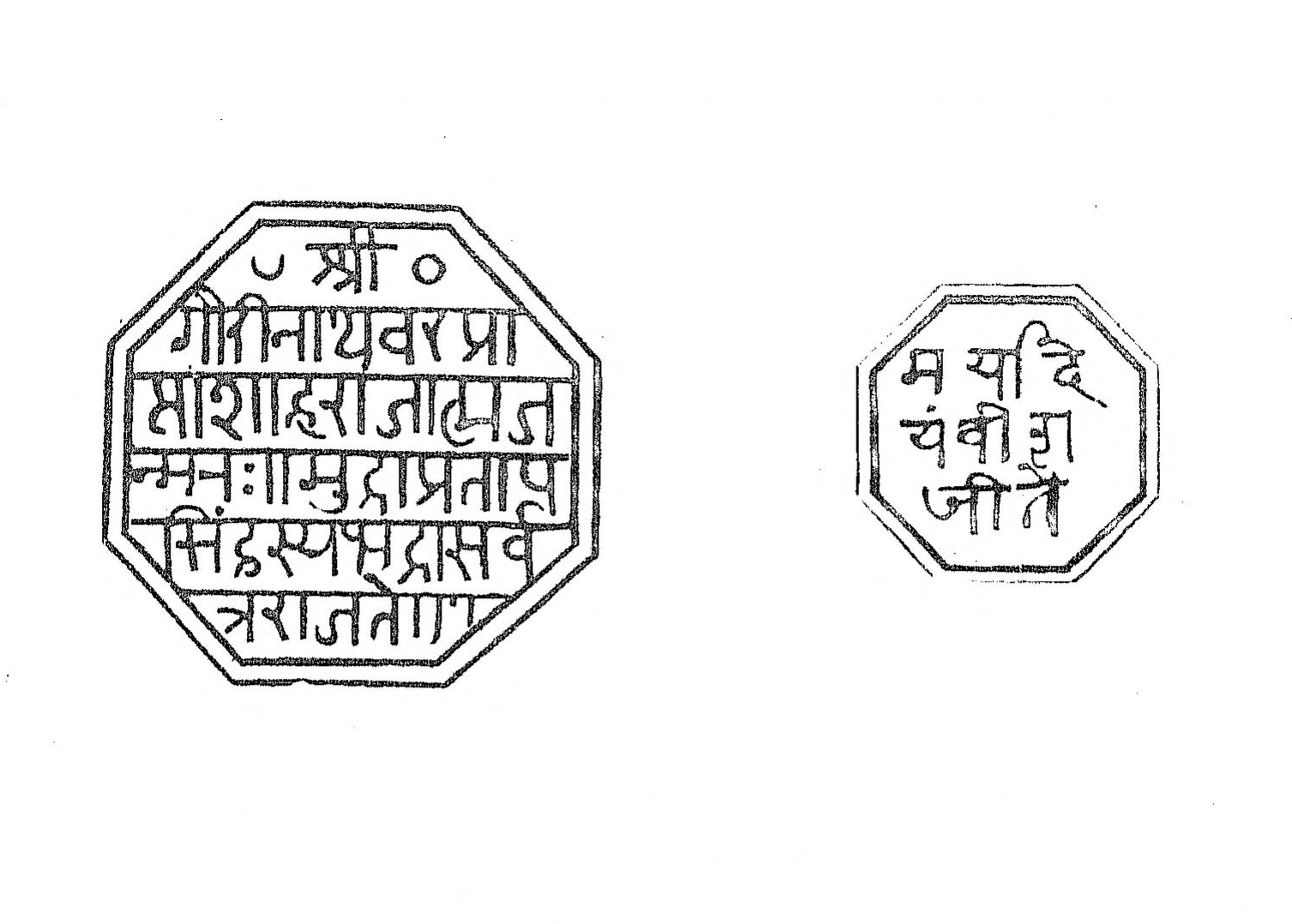
Royal Seal (left) and Endscript seal (right) of Pratap Singh Bhosale, 8th and last Chhatrapati of the Maratha Empire

=== Colonial India ===
==== British rule in India ====
Coat of arms of the East India Company, used during the Company Raj (1757–1858)

Coat of arms of the United Kingdom, used for official documents, publications and correspondence from the Parliament of the United Kingdom during the British Raj (1858–1947)

Star of India, an emblem used within India during the British Raj

==== Portuguese India ====
Coat of arms of Portuguese India (1600–1935)

Lesser coat of arms of Portuguese India (1935–1961)

Greater coat of arms of Portuguese India (1935–1951)

Greater coat of arms of Portuguese India (1951–1961)

==== French India ====
Emblem of France used in French India (1912–1954)

Great Seal of France

=== Azad Hind ===
Emblem of Azad Hind (1943–1945)

Seal of Azad Hind (1943–1945)

=== Dominion of India ===
Coat of arms of the United Kingdom used by the Dominion of India (15 August – 29 December 1947)

Emblem used by the Dominion of India (30 December 1947 – 25 January 1950)

Seal of the Constituent Assembly of India

== See also ==
- Flag of India
- Jana Gana Mana
- Vande Mataram
- National symbols of India
- List of Indian state emblems
- List of Indian state symbols
