= Commissioner of Police (India) =

Indian heads of the police force

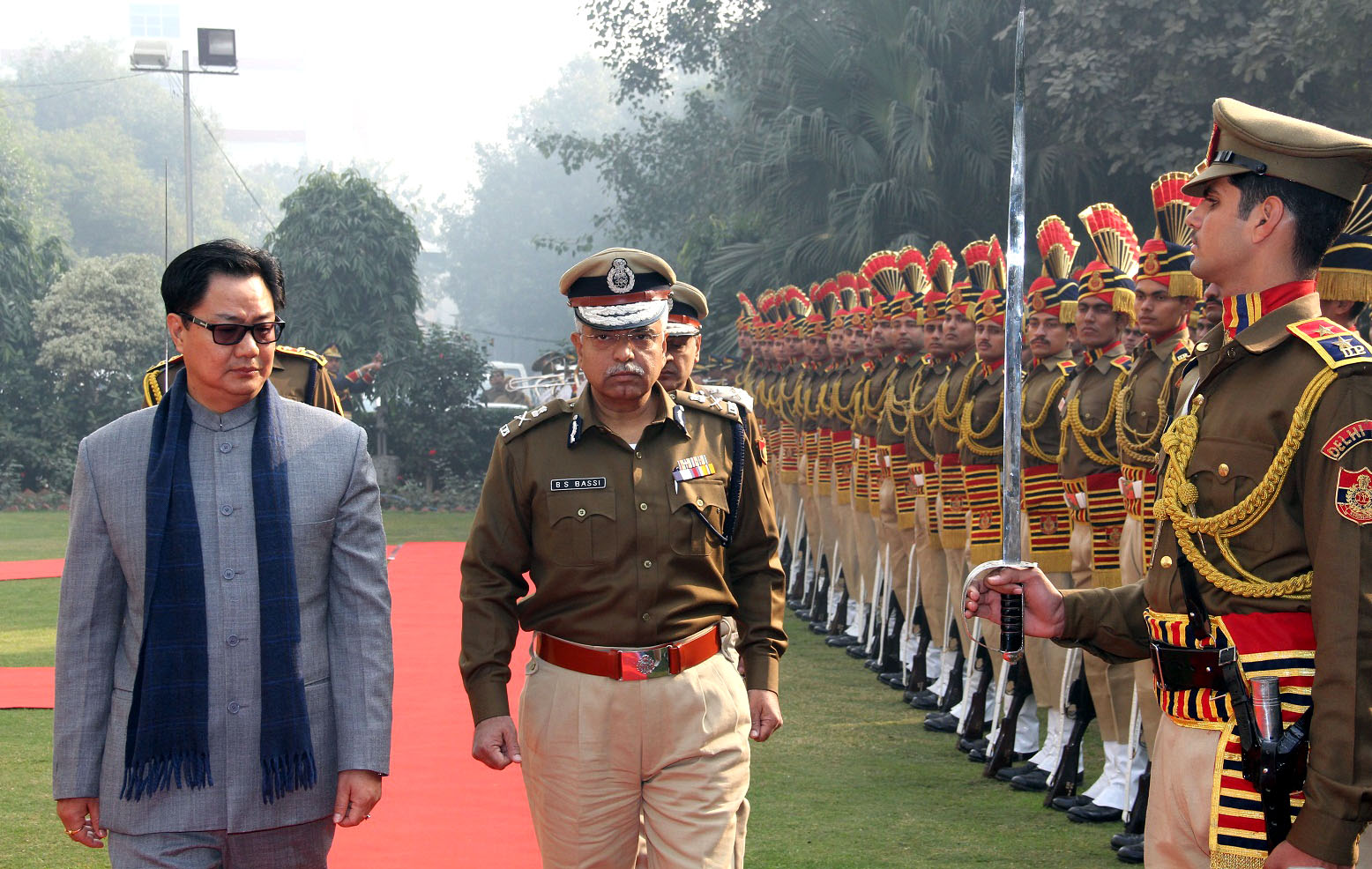
Minister of State for Home Affairs Kiren Rijiju inspecting the guard of honour, accompanied by CP Delhi, B.S. Bassi, in 2014

Commissioners of Police (CP) in India are heads of the police force in certain metropolitan areas colloquially referred to as 'police commissionerates'.

They are traditionally members of the Indian Police Service with executive magisterial powers not granted to other senior police officers (members of the Indian Police Service), evolving from the historical role of justice of the peace, assigned to commissioners leading the presidency towns of British India.

The rank and authority conferred upon commissioners of police is largely uniform throughout India in that they are all executive magistrates under the Code of Criminal Procedure, however varies in that a commissioner of police forces of larger cities tends to be equated to higher ranks in the Indian Police Service—three of India's four biggest cities are led by commissioners equated to the rank of director-general of police. The police commissioner of lowest rank in India is that of Thrissur City Police, which is led by a superintendent (the lowest possible rank of a police commissioner)

Commissioners of police and their police forces are generally subordinate to and part of the police force of the state thereof, the only exceptions being Delhi, Mumbai and Kolkata. The police forces of Mumbai and Kolkata are not part of the police force of their respective states; they report directly to their states' home ministers. As Delhi is a union territory with limited self-government, the commissioner does not report to the local union territory government; it reports directly to the union minister of home affairs. All, except one (Patna), of the 20 largest cities in India have police forces headed by commissioners of police.

Commissioners of Police in Kerala do not have magisterial powers. The Government of Kerala appointed senior IGP-rank IPS officers as Commissioners of Police for Thiruvananthapuram and Kochi as an initial step towards a full police commissionerate system; however, the move faced opposition. Consequently, the state government has not granted magisterial powers to the commissioners due to political opposition, including from within the ruling coalition.

== History and description ==
Traditionally at the district level, the Superintendent of Police (SP) or Senior SP (SSP) maintains law and order by working with the District Magistrate (DM). Under the Commissioners of Police (CP) system, the state governments may or may not grant certain powers of the executive magistrate to the commissioner, contrary to the Superintendent of Police or Senior SP of a police district who depends on the district magistrate. For large metropolitan cities, the CP system is generally considered more suitable policing system. The commissioner is assisted by special commissioner, joint commissioner, additional commissioner, deputy commissioner, assistant commissioner of police.

The Commissionerates present in New Delhi, Chennai, Madurai, Coimbatore, and Kolkata can be considered true Commissionerates as they exercise the powers of the District Magistrate and the Executive Magistrate. The organisational structure of the police commissionerates varies state to state. For instance, the Police Commissioners of Delhi, Mumbai and Kolkata report directly to the state government and not to the DGP. Similarly, in Kerala, the Commissioner of Police does not have magisterial powers.

=== Commissionerates ===
A Police Commissionerate's jurisdiction can consist of several adjoining districts. The Hyderabad City Police commissionerate since 1847 AD, established in the erstwhile Hyderabad State by the Nizams is the oldest police commissionerate in India. The British India government brought the CP system first to Kolkata and Chennai in 1856, and followed it in Mumbai in 1864.

=== Organisational structure ===
The police commissionerate is headed by a Commissioner of Police (CP). The post of Commissioner of Police can be held by an IPS officer of the rank SP and above, depending upon the sanction provided by the respective state government (or, in the case of Delhi, by the Government of India). The commissioner of police is assisted by special, joint, additional, deputy, and assistant commissioners of police, sanctioned by the respective state government. The organisation consists units like law and order, crimes, administration, armed reserve police, traffic police, special branch, security, etc. For the maintenance of law and order, there are police zones, divisions and sub divisions. Typically divisions are headed by deputy commissioners of police (DCPs), and sub divisions are headed by assistant commissioners of police (ACPs).

==== Hierarchy ====
The hierarchy of posts in Police Commissionerate system of Delhi is as given below, Police Commissionerate system in other cities may not have one or more of these posts:-

- Commissioner of Police (CP) i.e. DGP equivalent
- Special Commissioner of Police (Spl.CP) i.e. Addl. DGP equivalent
- Joint Commissioner of Police (Jt. CP) i.e. IG equivalent
- Additional Commissioner of Police (Addl.CP) i.e. DIG equivalent
- Deputy Commissioner of Police (DCP) i.e. SSP or SP equivalent
- Additional Deputy Commissioner of Police (Addl.DCP) i.e. Addl. SP equivalent
- Assistant commissioner of police (ACP) i.e. DSP or ASP equivalent

The subordinate police officers' hierarchy in the Police Commissionerate system is the same as in a district police headed by a Senior SP/SP, including ranks such as police inspector, sub-inspector, assistant sub-inspector, head constable, and constable.

== List of commissioners of police ==
Following is the list of commissioners of police (CP) in India, along with their respective ranks (these ranks can vary from time to time):-

=== Andhra Pradesh Police ===
Post	Rank	Reference
Commissioner of Police, NTR district	Additional Director General of Police (Addl.DGP)	
Commissioner of Police, Visakhapatnam	Additional Director General of Police (Addl.DGP)	
Commissioner of Police, Guntur	Inspector General of Police (IG) / Deputy Inspector General of Police (DIG)	
Commissioner of Police, Kurnool	Inspector General of Police (IG) / Deputy Inspector General of Police (DIG)	
Commissioner of Police, Rajamahendravaram	Inspector General of Police (IG) / Deputy Inspector General of Police (DIG)	
Commissioner of Police, Tirupati	Inspector General of Police (IG) / Deputy Inspector General of Police (DIG)	

=== Assam Police ===
Post	Rank	Reference
Commissioner of Police, Guwahati	Additional Director General of Police (Addl.DGP)	

=== Chhattisgarh Police ===
Post	Rank	Reference
Commissioner of Police, Raipur	Inspector General of Police (IG)	

=== Delhi Police ===
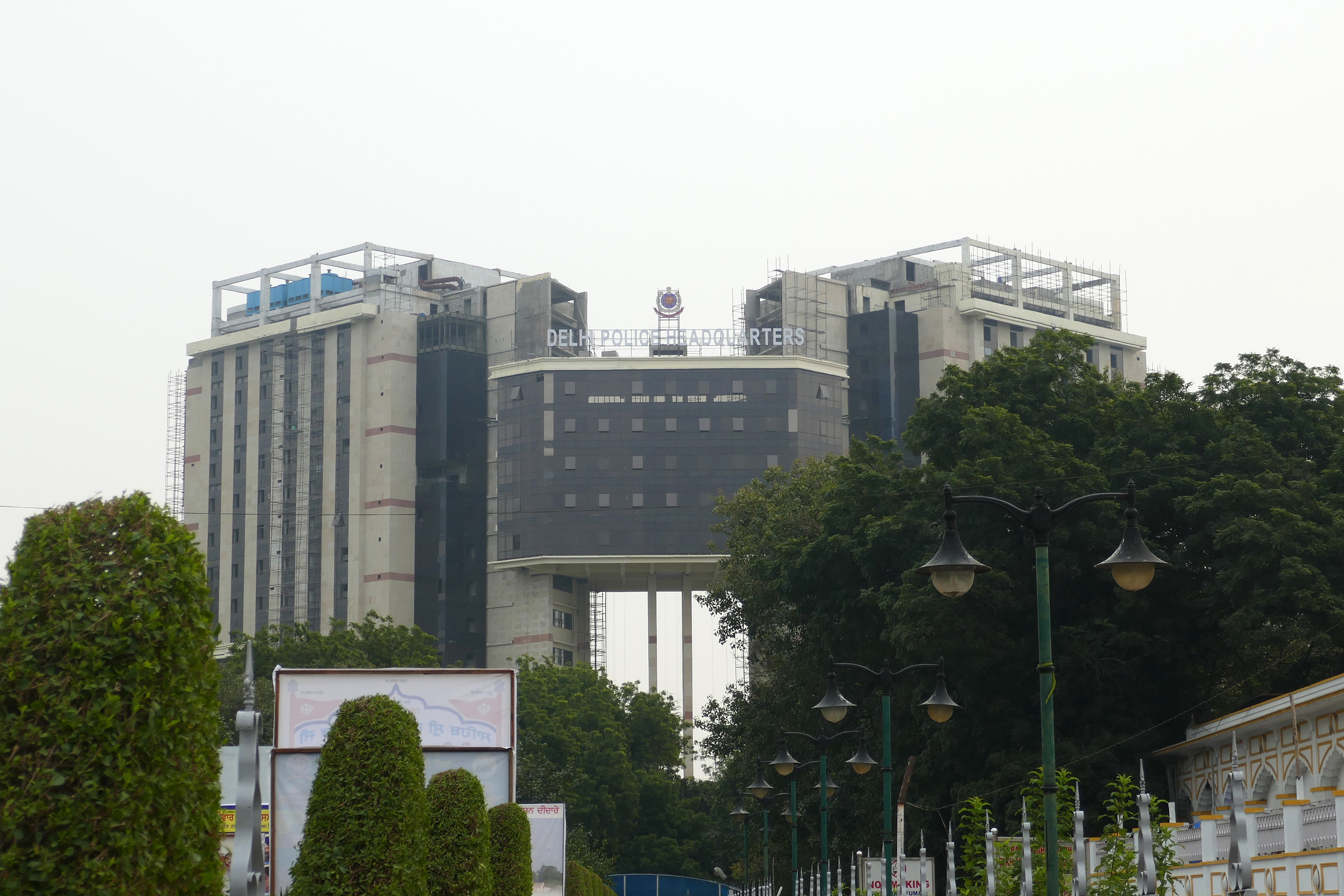
Delhi Police Headquarters, which serves as office of Delhi Police Commissioner

Post	Rank	Reference
Commissioner of Police, Delhi	Director General of Police (DGP) (Note: The Delhi Police Commissioner, a Director General (DGP) rank officer, is the head of Delhi Police. This is the only case in India where a CP (Commissioner of Police) heads the police force of the whole state/UT.)	

=== Gujarat Police ===
Post	Rank	Reference
Commissioner of Police, Ahmedabad	Additional Director General of Police (Addl.DGP)	
Commissioner of Police, Surat	Additional Director General of Police (Addl.DGP)	
Commissioner of Police, Rajkot	Additional Director General of Police (Addl.DGP)	
Commissioner of Police, Vadodara	Additional Director General of Police (Addl.DGP)	

=== Haryana Police ===
Post	Rank	Reference
Commissioner of Police, Gurugram	Inspector General of Police (IG)	
Commissioner of Police, Faridabad	Inspector General of Police (IG)	
Commissioner of Police, Panchkula	Inspector General of Police (IG)	

=== Karnataka Police ===
Post	Rank	Reference
Commissioner of Police, Bengaluru	Additional Director General of Police (Addl.DGP)	
Commissioner of Police, Belagavi	Deputy Inspector General of Police (DIG)	
Commissioner of Police, Hubballi-Dharwad	Deputy Inspector General of Police (DIG)	
Commissioner of Police, Kalaburagi	Deputy Inspector General of Police (DIG)	
Commissioner of Police, Mangaluru	Deputy Inspector General of Police (DIG)	
Commissioner of Police, Mysuru	Inspector General of Police (IG)	

=== Kerala Police ===
Post (Note: In Kerala Police, the Commissioners of Police (CPs) are officially also known as the District Police Chiefs (DPCs) of the respective police districts.)	Rank	Reference
Commissioner of Police, Thiruvananthapuram	Inspector General of Police (IG) / Deputy Inspector General of Police (DIG)	
Commissioner of Police, Kochi	Inspector General of Police (IG) / Deputy Inspector General of Police (DIG)	
Commissioner of Police, Kozhikode	Deputy Inspector General of Police (DIG)	
Commissioner of Police, Kollam City	Superintendent of Police (SP)	
Commissioner of Police, Thrissur City	Superintendent of Police (SP)	
Commissioner of Police, Kannur City	Superintendent of Police (SP)	

=== Madhya Pradesh Police ===
Post	Rank	Reference
Commissioner of Police, Bhopal	Inspector General of Police (IGP)	
Commissioner of Police, Indore	Inspector General of Police (IGP)	

=== Maharashtra Police ===
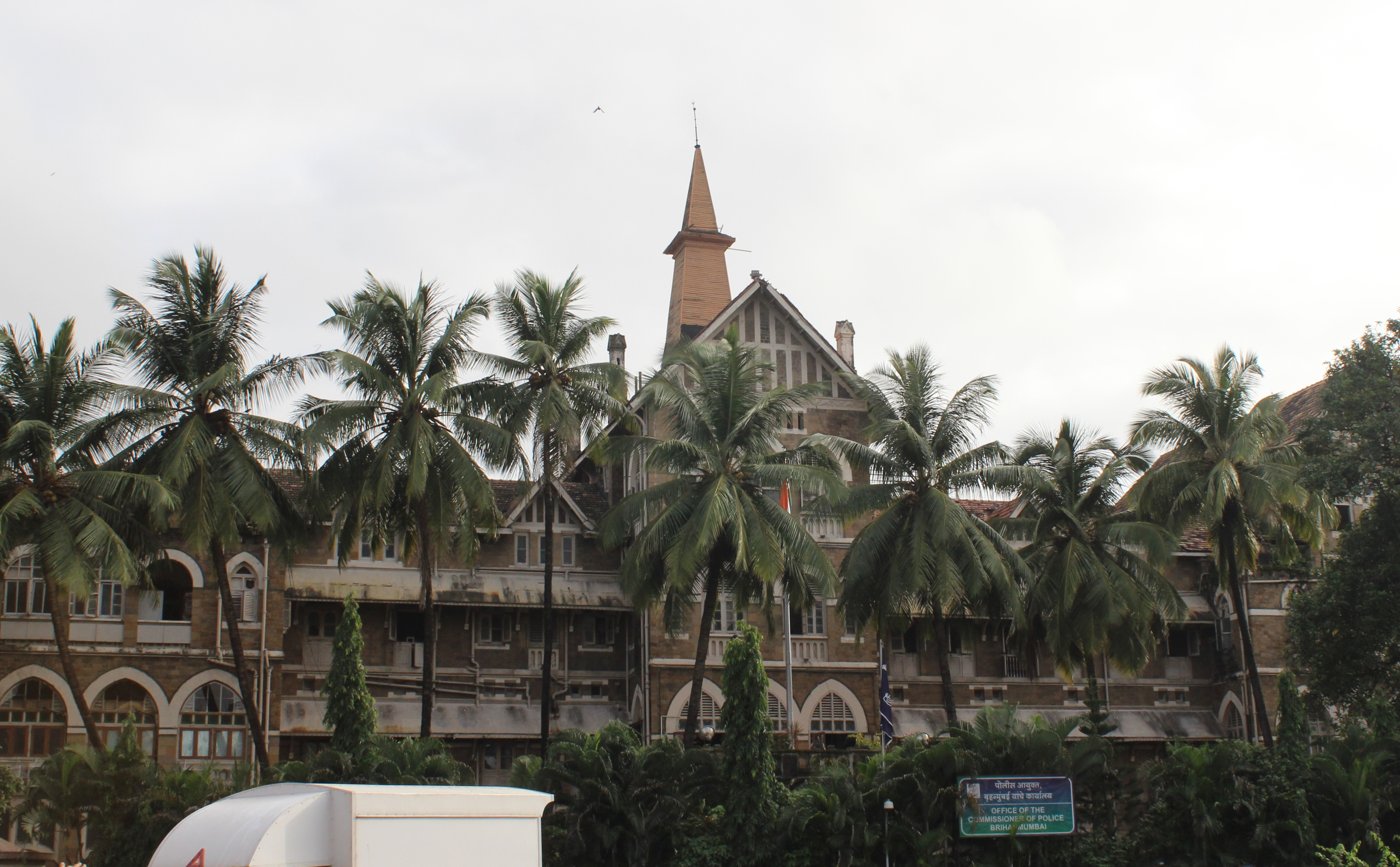
Office of Police Commissioner of Mumbai

Post	Rank	Reference
Commissioner of Police, Mumbai	Director General of Police (DG) (Note: The posts of Commissioner of Police (CP) of Mumbai and DGP (Director general of police i.e. state police chief) of Maharashtra are held by two different officers, both of whom are of Director General (DGP) rank. The Mumbai CP is one of the few CPs in the country who does not report to the state DGP. Both Mumbai CP and Maharashtra DGP report to ACS (Additional Chief Secretary) of Home Department of Maharashtra, who is a senior IAS officer.)	
Commissioner of Police, Pune	Additional Director General of Police (Addl.DGP)	
Commissioner of Police, Nagpur	Additional Director General of Police (Addl.DGP)	
Commissioner of Police, Thane	Additional Director General of Police (Addl.DGP)	
Commissioner of Police, Navi Mumbai	Additional Director General of Police (Addl.DGP)	
Commissioner of Police, Nashik	Additional Director General of Police (Addl.DGP)	
Commissioner of Police, SambhajiNagar	Inspector General of Police (IG)	
Commissioner of Police, Mira-Bhayandar, Vasai-Virar (MBVV)	Additional Director General of Police (Addl.DGP)	
Commissioner of Police, Pimpri-Chinchwad	Inspector General of Police (IG)	
Commissioner of Police, Solapur	Deputy Inspector General of Police (DIG)	
Commissioner of Police, Amravati	Deputy Inspector General of Police (DIG)	
Commissioner of Police, Railways, Mumbai	Inspector General of Police (IG)	

=== Nagaland Police ===
Post	Rank	Reference
Commissioner of Police, Dimapur	Deputy Inspector General of Police (DIG)	

=== Odisha Police ===
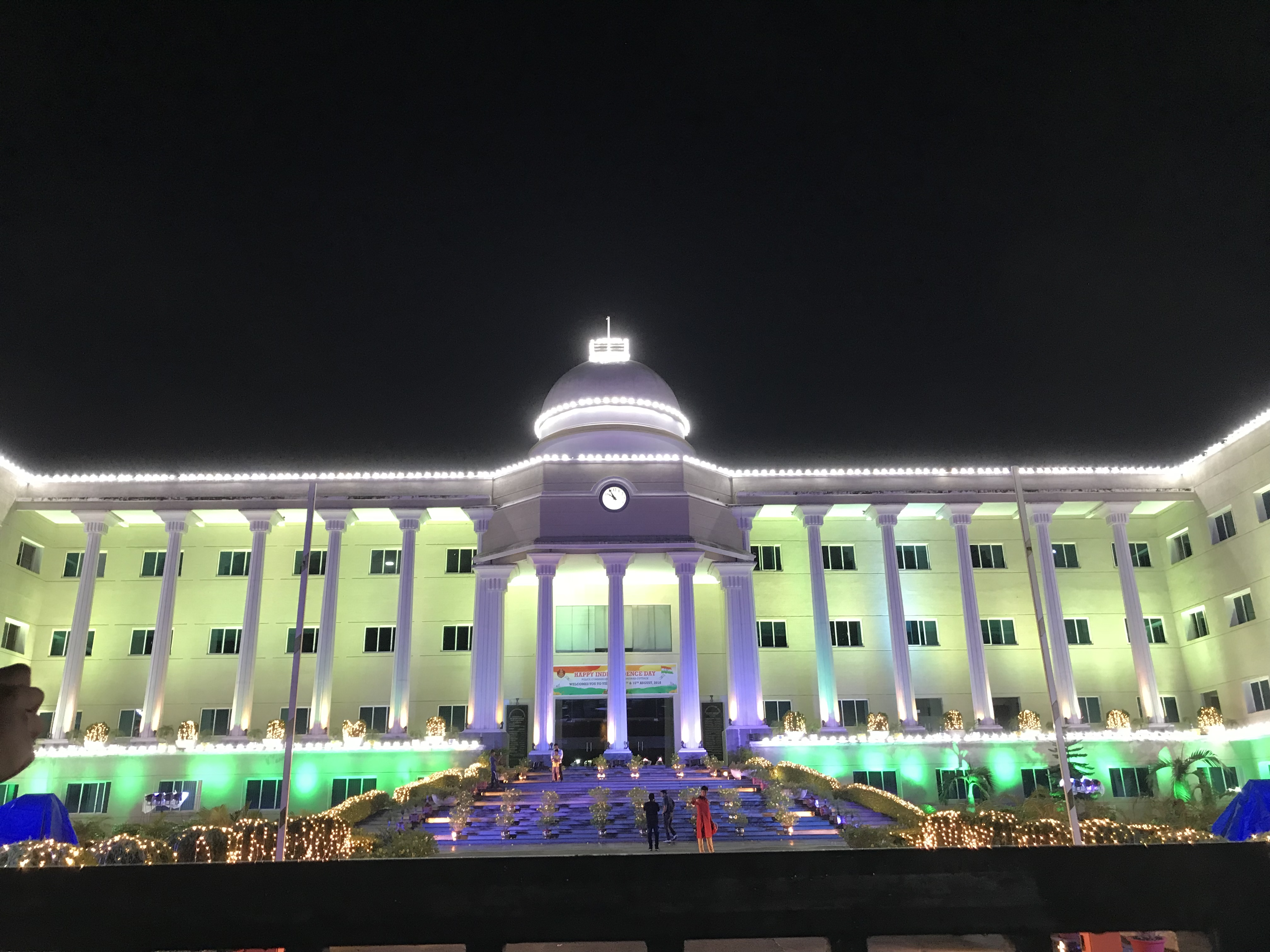
Office of CP of Bhubaneswar-Cuttack

Post	Rank	Reference
Commissioner of Police, Bhubaneswar-Cuttack	Additional Director General of Police (Addl.DGP)	

=== Punjab Police ===
Post	Rank	Reference
Commissioner of Police, Amritsar	Inspector General of Police (IG)	
Commissioner of Police, Ludhiana	Inspector General of Police (IG)	
Commissioner of Police, Jalandhar	Deputy Inspector General of Police (DIG)	

=== Rajasthan Police ===
Post	Rank	Reference
Commissioner of Police, Jaipur	Additional Director General of Police (Addl.DGP)	
Commissioner of Police, Jodhpur	Inspector General of Police (IG)	

=== Tamil Nadu Police ===
Post	Rank	Reference
Commissioner of Police, Chennai	Additional Director General of Police (Addl.DGP)	
Commissioner of Police, Coimbatore	Inspector General of Police (IG)	
Commissioner of Police, Madurai	Inspector General of Police (IG)	
Commissioner of Police, Salem	Inspector General of Police (IG)	
Commissioner of Police, Tiruppur	Inspector General of Police (IG)	
Commissioner of Police, Tirunelveli	Inspector General of Police (IG)	
Commissioner of Police, Tiruchirappalli	Inspector General of Police (IG)	
Commissioner of Police, Avadi	Additional Director General of Police (Addl.DGP)	
Commissioner of Police, Tambaram	Additional Director General of Police (Addl.DGP)	

=== Telangana Police ===
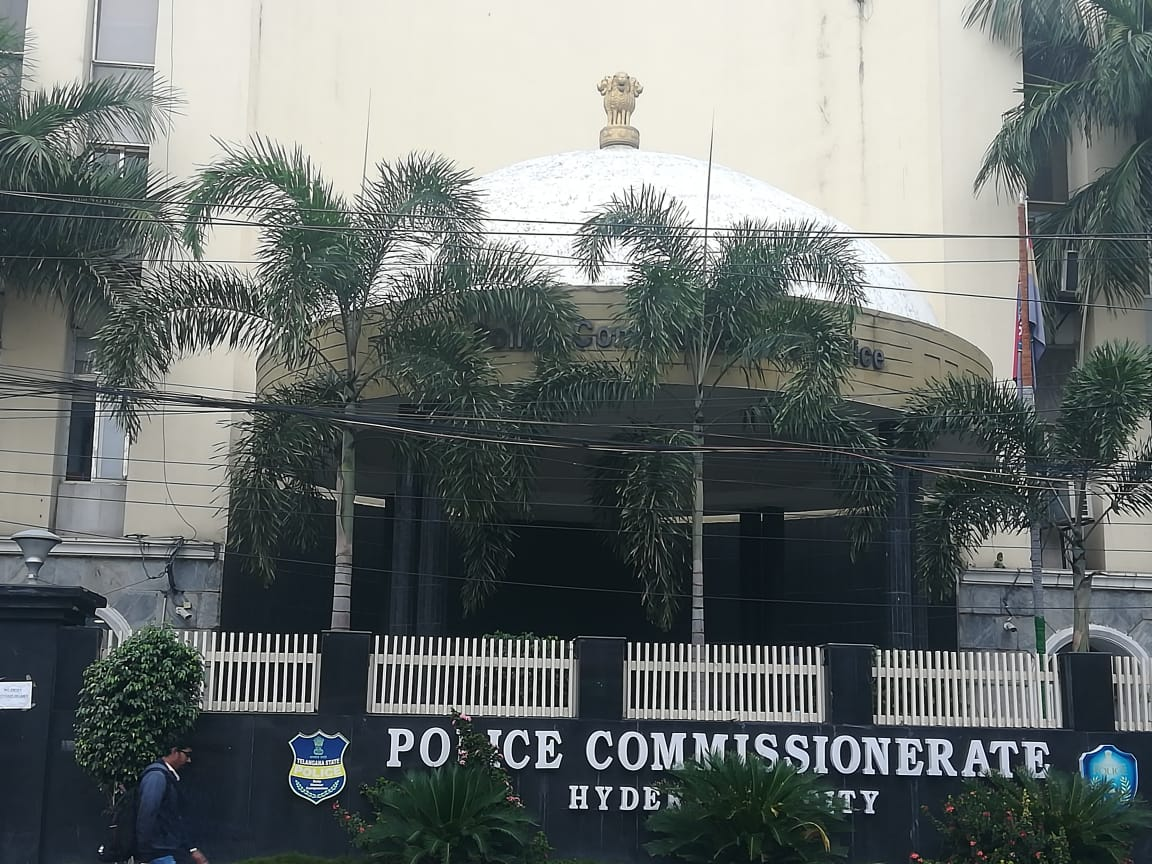
Police Commissionerate, Hyderabad City

Post	Rank	Reference
Commissioner of Police, Hyderabad City	Director General of Police (DGP)	
Commissioner of Police, Cyberabad	Inspector General of Police (IG)	
Commissioner of Police, Karimnagar	Deputy Inspector General of Police (DIG)	
Commissioner of Police, Nizamabad	Superintendent of Police (SP)	
Commissioner of Police, Khammam	Superintendent of Police (SP)	
Commissioner of Police, Rachakonda	Additional Director General of Police (Addl.DGP)	
Commissioner of Police, Ramagundam	Deputy Inspector General of Police (DIG)	
Commissioner of Police, Siddipet	Superintendent of Police (SP)	
Commissioner of Police, Warangal	Deputy Inspector General of Police (DIG)	

=== Uttar Pradesh Police ===
Post	Rank	Reference
Commissioner of Police, Lucknow	Additional Director General of Police (Addl.DGP)	
Commissioner of Police, Kanpur	Additional Director General of Police (Addl.DGP)	
Commissioner of Police, Agra	Inspector General of Police (IG)	
Commissioner of Police, Gautam Buddha Nagar	Additional Director General of Police (Addl.DGP)	
Commissioner of Police, Ghaziabad	Inspector General of Police (IG)	
Prayagraj Police Commissionerate	Inspector General of Police (IG)	
Commissioner of Police, Varanasi	Additional Director General of Police (Addl.DGP)	

=== West Bengal Police ===
Post	Rank	Reference
Commissioner of Police, Asansol-Durgapur	Inspector General of Police (IGP)	
Commissioner of Police, Barrackpore	Deputy Inspector General of Police (DIG)	
Commissioner of Police, Bidhannagar	Additional Director General of Police (ADG)	
Commissioner of Police, Chandannagar	Deputy Inspector General of Police (DIG)	
Commissioner of Police, Howrah	Inspector General of Police (IGP)	
Commissioner of Police, Kolkata	Additional Director General of Police (ADG) (Note: Kolkata Police functions independently of the West Bengal Police, and its Commissioner of Police reports directly to the Home and Hill Affairs Department of the Government of West Bengal. The Kolkata CP is one of the few CPs in the country who does not report to the state DGP. Both Kolkata CP and WB DGP report to ACS (Additional Chief Secretary) of Home Department of West Bengal, who is a senior IAS officer.)	
Commissioner of Police, Siliguri	Inspector General of Police (IGP)	

== States and UTs without CP ==
The following police forces in India do not have Police Commissionerate (i.e. Commissioner of Police or CP) system:-

=== States ===
- Arunachal Pradesh Police
- Bihar Police
- Goa Police
- Himachal Pradesh Police
- Jharkhand Police
- Manipur Police
- Meghalaya Police
- Mizoram Police
- Sikkim Police
- Tripura Police
- Uttarakhand Police

Among the 10 most populous states of India, only Bihar (3rd most populous) does not have CP system in any of its cities.

=== Union territories ===
- Andaman and Nicobar Islands Police
- Chandigarh Police
- Dadra and Nagar Haveli and Daman and Diu Police
- Jammu and Kashmir Police
- Ladakh Police
- Lakshadweep Police
- Puducherry Police

=== Largest cities without CP ===
Among the Indian cities having population above 1.5 million (2011 Census), the only city which does not have CP system is Patna.

== See also ==
- Director general of police
- District magistrate
- Divisional commissioner
- Law enforcement in India
- Municipal commissioner
- Police forces of India
- Police ranks and insignia of India
