= Mamata Banerjee =

Chief Minister of West Bengal from 2011 to 2026

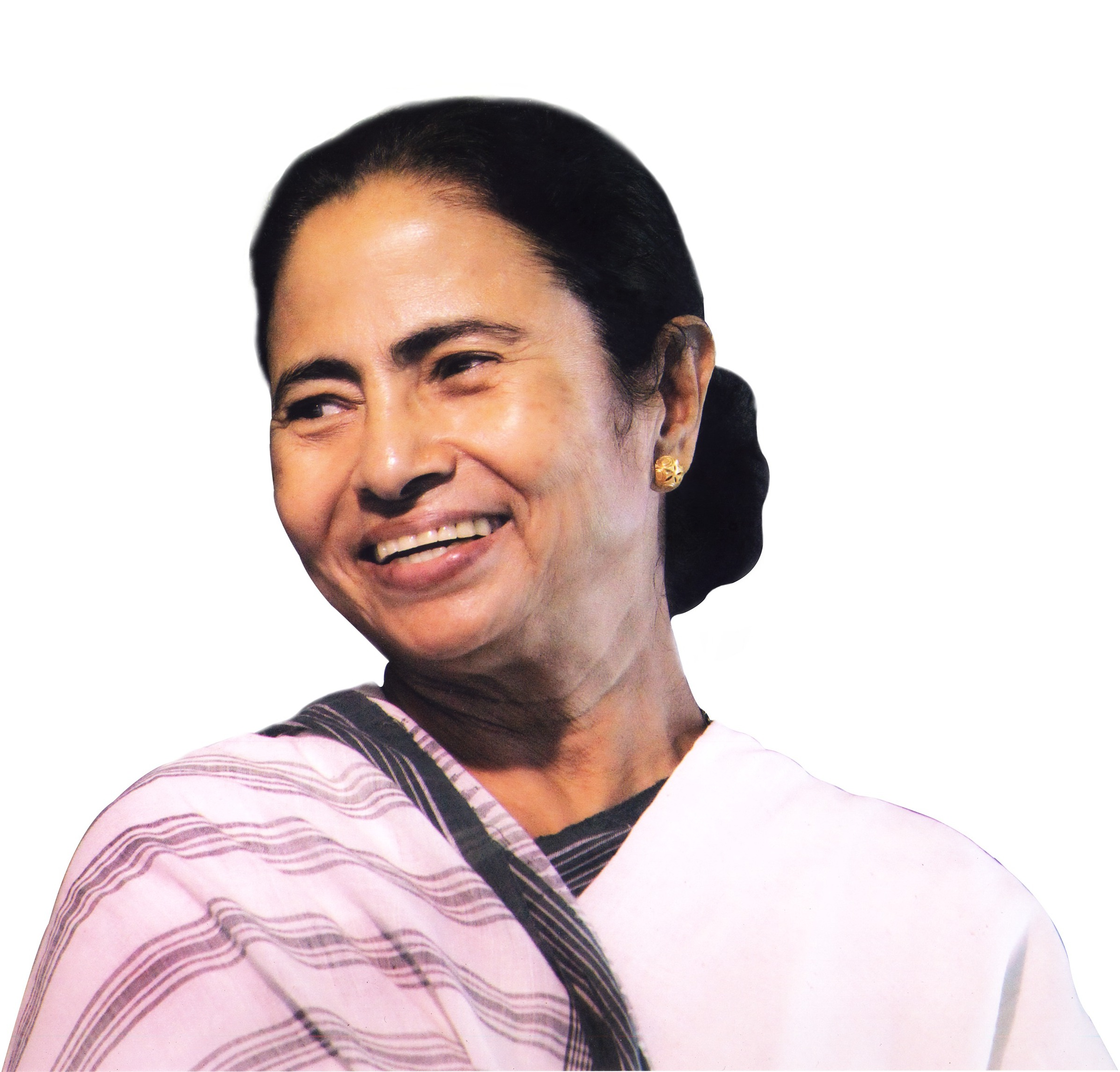
- Official Portrait

8th Chief Minister of West Bengal
- In office 20 May 2011 – 7 May 2026
- Governor: List: M. K. Narayanan D. Y. Patil (additional charge) Keshari Nath Tripathi Jagdeep Dhankhar La. Ganesan (additional charge) C. V. Ananda Bose R. N. Ravi
- Cabinet: Banerjee I Banerjee II; Banerjee III
- Preceded by: Buddhadeb Bhattacharjee
- Succeeded by: Suvendu Adhikari
Additional ministries
In office 20 May 2011 – 7 May 2026
Ministry and Departments	Home & Hill Affairs; Personnel & Administrative Reforms; Finance & Excise; Planning; Statistics Program Implementation; Health and Family Welfare; Land and Land Reforms; Refugee and Rehabilitation; Information & Cultural Affairs; Minority Affairs & Madrassah Education; Sports & Youth Affairs
Preceded by	Buddhadeb Bhattacharjee (as minister of Home and Hill Affairs); Surya Kanta Mishra (as Minister of Health and Family welfare)
Succeeded by	Suvendu Adhikari (as Minister of Home and Hill Affairs); Sharadwat Mukherjee ( as Minister of Health and Family welfare)

Member of West Bengal Legislative Assembly
- In office 3 October 2021 – 4 May 2026
- Preceded by: Sovandeb Chattopadhyay
- Succeeded by: Suvendu Adhikari
- Constituency: Bhabanipur
- In office 16 November 2011 – 2 May 2021
- Preceded by: Subrata Bakshi
- Succeeded by: Sovandeb Chattopadhyay
- Constituency: Bhabanipur

Chairperson of the All India Trinamool Congress
- In office 2001 – 2026
- Preceded by: Ajit Kumar Panja
- Succeeded by: Herself (as Chairperson of Mamata All India Trinamool Congress); Arup Roy (as Chairperson of Democratic Trinamool Congress)
Union Cabinet offices
Union Minister of Railways
In office 22 May 2009 – 19 May 2011
Prime Minister	Manmohan Singh
Preceded by	Lalu Prasad Yadav
Succeeded by	Dinesh Trivedi
In office 13 October 1999 – 15 March 2001
Prime Minister	Atal Bihari Vajpayee
Preceded by	Ram Naik
Succeeded by	Nitish Kumar
Union Minister of Coal
In office 9 January 2004 – 22 May 2004
Prime Minister	Atal Bihari Vajpayee
Preceded by	Karia Munda
Succeeded by	Shibu Soren
Union Minister of Mines
In office 9 January 2004 – 22 May 2004
Prime Minister	Atal Bihari Vajpayee
Preceded by	Ramesh Bais (MOS (I/C))
Succeeded by	Shibu Soren
Union Minister of State for Human Resource Development
In office 21 June 1991 — 17 January 1993
Prime Minister	P. V. Narasimha Rao
Minister	Arjun Singh
1991—1993	Departments in-charge for: Youth Affairs and Sports; Woman and Child Development
Preceded by	Bhagey Gobardhan
Succeeded by	Mukul Wasnik (Youth Affairs and Sports); Basavarajeshwari (Women and Child Development)
Union Cabinet Minister (without portfolio)
In office 8 September 2003 – 8 January 2004
Prime Minister	Atal Bihari Vajpayee
Preceded by	N. Gopalaswami Ayyangar
Succeeded by	Natwar Singh

Member of Parliament, Lok Sabha
- In office 19 June 1991 – 13 May 2011
- Preceded by: Biplab Dasgupta
- Succeeded by: Subrata Bakshi
- Constituency: Kolkata Dakshin, West Bengal
- In office 31 December 1984 – 2 December 1989
- Preceded by: Somnath Chatterjee
- Succeeded by: Malini Bhattacharya
- Constituency: Jadavpur, West Bengal

Personal details
- Born: 5 January 1955 (age 71) (Note: Original date: 5 October 1959) Calcutta, West Bengal, India
- Party: Mamata All India Trinamool Congress (since 2026)
- Other political affiliations: All India Trinamool Congress (1998–2026); Indian National Congress (1975–1998)
- Relations: Abhishek Banerjee (nephew)
- Education: University of Calcutta
- Nickname: Didi (transl. elder sister)
- Position Held: 1970–80: General-Secretary, Mahila Congress (I), West Bengal; 1978–81: Secretary, District Congress Committee (Indira) [D.C.C. (I)], Calcutta South; 1984: General-Secretary, All India Youth Congress (I); 1985–87: Member, Committee on the Welfare of Scheduled Castes and Scheduled Tribes; 1987–88: Member, National Council, All India Youth Congress (I) Member, Consultative Committee, Ministry of Home Affairs Member, Consultative Committee, Ministry of Human Resource Development Member, Executive Committee, Congress Parliamentary Party [C.P.P. (I)]; 1989: Member, Executive Committee, Pradesh Congress Committee [P.C.C. (I)], West Bengal; 1990: President, Youth Congress, West Bengal; 1993–96: Member, Committee on Home Affairs; 1995–96: Member, Consultative Committee, Ministry of Home Affairs Member, Committee on Public Accounts; 1996–97: Member, Committee on Home Affairs Member, Consultative Committee, Ministry of Home Affairs; 1998–99: Chairman, Committee on Railways, Member of General Purposes Committee Member, Consultative Committee, Ministry of Home Affairs; 1999: Leader, All India Trinamool Congress Parliamentary Party, Lok Sabha Member, General Purposes Committee; 2001–2003: Member, Consultative Committee, Ministry of Industries; 8 September 2003 – 8 January 2004: Union Cabinet Minister (without any portfolio); 2004: Member, Committee on Personnel, Public Grievances, Law & Justice; 5 August 2006: Member, Committee on Home Affairs; 5 August 2007: Member, Committee on Home Affairs; 31 May 2009 – 19 July 2011: Leader, All India Trinamool Congress Parliamentary Party, Lok Sabha
- As of 9 October 2011

Mamata Banerjee (Bengali pronunciation: [ˈmɔmot̪aˑ ˈbɔnd̪ːoˌpad̪ːʱae̯]; born 5 January 1955) is an Indian politician and lawyer who served as the eighth chief minister of West Bengal from 2011 to 2026. She was the first and only woman to hold that office. She founded the All India Trinamool Congress (AITC), and has previously served as a Union Cabinet Minister. She currently is the leader of the Mamata All India Trinamool Congress (MAITC), following the 2026 Trinamool Congress split.

She founded the AITC in 1998 after separating from the Indian National Congress (I), and became its second president later in 2001. She often refers to herself as Didi (meaning, elder sister in Bengali). She made history as the first sitting Chief Minister of India to argue as a lawyer in the Supreme Court. Banerjee previously served twice as Minister of Railways, becoming the first woman to do so. She was also the second female Minister of Coal, and Minister of Human Resource Development, Youth Affairs and Sports, Women and Child Development in the cabinet of the Indian government.

She rose to prominence after opposing the erstwhile land acquisition policies for industrialisation of the Left Front-led government in West Bengal for Special Economic Zones at the cost of agriculturalists and farmers at Singur. In 2011, Banerjee pulled off a landslide victory for the AITC alliance in West Bengal, defeating the 34-year-old Communist Party of India (Marxist)-led Left Front government. She led her party to a landslide victory in the 2021 West Bengal assembly polls.

She served as a member of West Bengal Legislative Assembly from Bhabanipur from 2011 to 2021. She contested the Nandigram assembly seat and lost to the BJP's Suvendu Adhikari in the 2021 state election, (Note: For more details see Nandigram Controversy) though her party won a large majority of seats. She is the third West Bengal Chief Minister to lose an election from her own constituency, after Prafulla Chandra Sen in 1967 and Buddhadeb Bhattacharjee in 2011. She got elected as member of West Bengal Legislative Assembly again from Bhabanipur constituency in the bypoll. Banerjee was fourteenth of the 18 female Indian chief ministers.

Banerjee became the second-longest-serving Chief Minister of West Bengal after Jyoti Basu on 26 October 2025, surpassing Bidhan Chandra Roy. She also became the second-longest-serving female Chief Minister in India on 22 September 2025, surpassing J. Jayalalithaa, though she remained behind Sheila Dikshit.

Banerjee lost her seat in the 2026 assembly elections , and the All India Trinamool Congress was defeated. Having refused to resign voluntarily, her tenure as chief minister came to an end as the assembly was dissolved by the governor upon the conclusion of its five-year term on 7 May 2026.

== Early life and education ==
Banerjee was born in Calcutta (now Kolkata), West Bengal, to a Bengali Brahmin family. Her parents were Promileswar Banerjee and Gayetri Devi. Banerjee's father, Promileswar, died due to lack of medical treatment, when she was 17.

In 1970, Banerjee completed the higher secondary board examination from Deshbandhu Sishu Sikshalay. She received a bachelor's degree in history from Jogamaya Devi College. Later, she earned her master's degree in Islamic history from the University of Calcutta. This was followed by a degree in education from Shri Shikshayatan College and a law degree from Jogesh Chandra Chaudhuri Law College, Kolkata.

In 1984, Mamata Banerjee prefixed her name with ‘Dr’, claiming that she had completed her doctorate. After it came to light that the university (University of East Georgia) from which Banerjee had putatively completed her PhD did not exist, she stopped prefixing her name with the ‘Dr’ title.

Banerjee became involved with politics when she was only 15. While studying at the Jogamaya Devi College, she established Chhatra Parishad Unions, the student wing of the Congress (I) Party, defeating the All India Democratic Students Organisation affiliated with the Socialist Unity Centre of India (Communist). She continued in the Congress (I) Party in West Bengal, serving in a variety of positions within the party and in other local political organisations.

== Early political career (1984–2011) ==
=== Political career with Congress (I) ===
Banerjee began her political career in the Congress (I) party as a young woman in the 1970s. In 1975 she gained attention in the press media when she danced on the car of socialist activist and politician Jayaprakash Narayan as a protest against him, during the Emergency. She quickly rose in the ranks of the local Congress group and remained the general secretary of Mahila Congress (Indira), West Bengal, from 1976 to 1980. In the 1984 general election, Banerjee became one of India's youngest parliamentarians ever, defeating veteran Communist politician Somnath Chatterjee, to win the Jadavpur parliamentary Constituency in West Bengal. She also became the general secretary of the Indian Youth Congress in 1984. She lost her seat to Malini Bhattacharya of the Communist Party of India (Marxist) in the 1989 general elections in an anti-Congress wave. She was re-elected in the 1991 general elections, having settled into the Calcutta South constituency. She retained the Kolkata South seat in the 1996, 1998, 1999, 2004 and 2009 general elections. On 16 August 1990, then Youth Congress leader Mamata Banerjee was attacked by CPI(M) cadres while leading a protest rally near Hazra Crossing in Kolkata during a Congress-called bandh over deaths caused by adulterated edible oil, with CPI(M) worker Lalu Alam allegedly striking her on the head and fracturing her skull, later apologising after she came to power in 2011.

Banerjee was appointed the Union Minister of State for Human Resources Development, Youth Affairs and Sports, and Women and Child Development in 1991 by prime minister, P. V. Narasimha Rao. As the sports minister, she announced that she would resign and protested in a rally at the Brigade Parade Ground in Kolkata, against the Government's indifference towards her proposal to improve sports in the country. She was discharged of her portfolios in 1993. In April 1996, she alleged that Congress (I) was behaving as a stooge of the CPI-M in West Bengal. She said that she was the lone voice of reason and wanted a "clean Congress".

In December 1992, Banerjee took a physically challenged girl Dipali Basak, who was allegedly raped by CPI(M) cadre Souvagya Basak, to Writers' Building to the then Chief Minister Jyoti Basu but was harassed by the police before being arrested and put on detention. She had sworn she would enter the building again only as chief minister.

The State Youth Congress led by Mamata Banerjee organised a protest march to Writers' Building in Kolkata on 21 July 1993 against the Left Front government. They demanded that voters' ID cards be made the only required document for voting, to put a stop to CPM's "scientific rigging". Thirteen people were shot and killed by police during the protest and many others were injured. Reacting to this incident the then-Chief Minister of West Bengal, Jyoti Basu, said that the "police had done a good job." During the 2014 inquiry, Justice (retired) Sushanta Chatterjee, former Chief Justice of the Orissa High Court, described the police response as "unprovoked and unconstitutional". "The commission has come to the conclusion that the case is even worse than Jallianwala Bagh massacre," said Justice Chatterjee.

=== Founding Trinamool Congress ===
In 1997, due to difference in political views with the then West Bengal Pradesh Congress Committee president Somendra Nath Mitra, Banerjee left the Congress (I) Party in West Bengal and became one of the founding members of the All India Trinamool Congress, along with Mukul Roy. It quickly became the primary opposition party to the long-standing Left Front government in the state. On 11 December 1998, she controversially held a Samajwadi Party MP, Daroga Prasad Saroj, by the collar and dragged him out of the well of the Lok Sabha to prevent him from protesting against the Women's Reservation Bill.

==== Railway Minister (first tenure), 1999–2000 ====
In 1999, she joined the BJP-led National Democratic Alliance (NDA) government and became Railways Minister. In 2000, Banerjee presented her first Railway Budget. In it, she fulfilled many of her promises to her home state West Bengal. She introduced a new biweekly New Delhi-Sealdah Rajdhani Express train and four express trains connecting various parts of West Bengal, namely the Howrah-Purulia Rupasi Bangla Express, the Sealdah-New Jalpaiguri Padatik Express, the Shalimar-Adra Aranyak Express, the Sealdah-Ajmer Ananya Superfast Express, and Sealdah-Amritsar Akal Takht Superfast Express. She also increased the frequency of the Pune-Howrah Azad Hind Express and extended at least three express train services. Work on the Digha-Howrah Express service was also hastened during her brief tenure.

She also focused on developing tourism, enabling the Darjeeling Himalayan Railway section to obtain two additional locomotives and proposing the Indian Railway Catering and Tourism Corporation Limited. She also commented that India should play a pivotal role in the Trans-Asian Railway and that rail links between Bangladesh and Nepal would be reintroduced. In all, she introduced 19 new trains for the 2000–2001 fiscal year.

In 2000, she and Ajit Kumar Panja resigned to protest the hike in petroleum prices, and then withdrew their resignations without providing any reasons.

==== 2001 West Bengal election ====
In early 2001, after Tehelka's exposure of Operation West End, Banerjee walked out of the NDA cabinet and allied with the Congress Party for West Bengal's 2001 elections, to protest the corruption charges levelled by the website against senior ministers of the government.

==== Minister of Coal and Mines, January 2004 – May 2004 ====
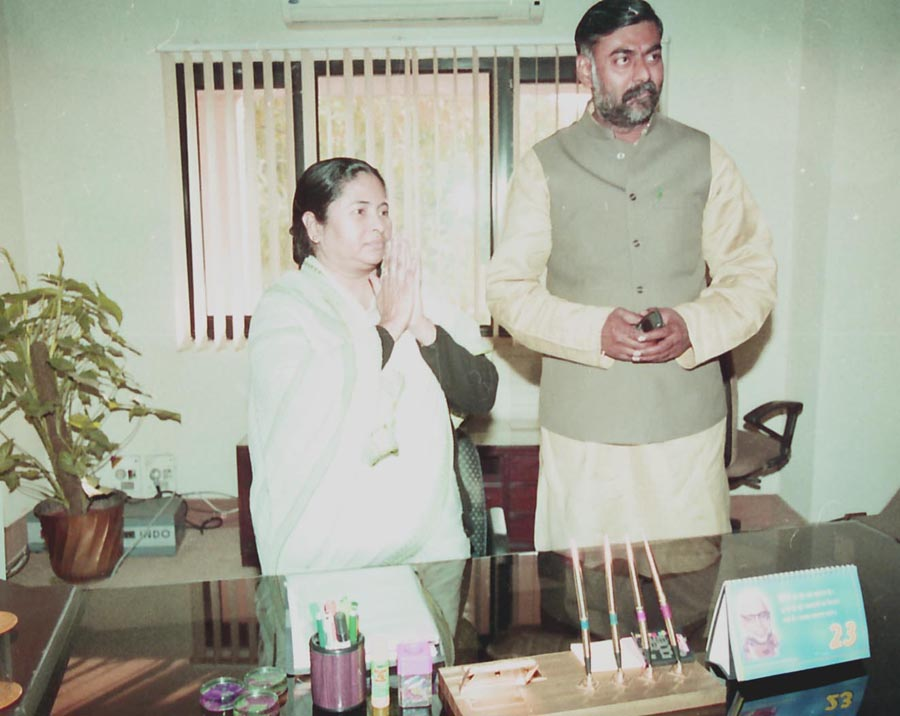
Banerjee assumes the charge of the Minister for Coal and Mines in New Delhi on 9 January 2004

She returned to the NDA government in September 2003 as a cabinet minister without any portfolio. Along with Mamata, her party colleague Sudip Banerjee was also inducted in the Vajpayee ministry. On 9 January 2004 she took charge as Ministry of Coal and Mines. During her short term as the minister of coal and mines, the government disallowed the sale of the National Aluminium Company. She held the Coal and Mines portfolios till 22 May 2004.

==== 2004–2006 election setbacks ====
In Indian general election of 2004, her party aligned with the Bharatiya Janata Party. However, the alliance lost the election and she was the only Trinamool Congress member to be elected from a parliamentary seat from West Bengal. Banerjee suffered further setbacks in 2005 when her party lost control of the Kolkata Municipal Corporation and the sitting mayor Subrata Mukherjee defected from her party. In 2006, the Trinamool Congress was defeated in West Bengal's Assembly Elections, losing more than half of its sitting members.

On 4 August 2006, Banerjee hurled her resignation papers at the deputy speaker Charanjit Singh Atwal in Lok Sabha. She was provoked by Speaker Somnath Chatterjee's rejection of her adjournment motion on illegal infiltration by Bangladeshis in West Bengal on the grounds that it was not in the proper format.

=== Singur, Nandigram and other movements ===
On 20 October 2005, she protested against the forceful land acquisition and the atrocities perpetrated against local farmers in the name of the industrial development policy of the Buddhadeb Bhattacharjee government in West Bengal. Benny Santoso, CEO of the Indonesia-based Salim Group, had pledged a large investment in West Bengal, and the West Bengal government had given him farmland in Howrah, sparking protests. In soaking rain, Banerjee and other Trinamool Congress members stood in front of the Taj Hotel where Santoso had arrived, shut out by the police. Later, she and her supporters followed Santoso's convoy. A planned "black flag" protest was avoided when the government had Santoso arrive three hours ahead of schedule.

==== Singur protest ====
In November 2006, Banerjee was forcibly stopped on her way to Singur for a rally against a proposed Tata Motors car project. Banerjee reached the West Bengal assembly and protested at the venue. She addressed a press conference at the assembly and announced a 12-hour shutdown by her party on Friday. After being arrested by police earlier in that day "for violating prohibitory orders" near Singur, she alleged that the administration had acted "unconstitutionally" by preventing her from entering Singur where the Tata motors proposed to set up a small car factory. She was intercepted at Hooghly and sent back. After this incident the Trinamool Congress MLAs protested by damaging furniture and microphones and vandalising the West Bengal Legislative Assembly Building. A major strike was called on 14 December 2006. But all in all there was no gain. On 4 December, Banerjee began the historic 26-day hunger strike in Kolkata protesting the forcible acquisition of farmland by the government. The then-President A. P. J. Abdul Kalam, who was concerned about her health, spoke to the then-Prime Minister Manmohan Singh to resolve the issue. Kalam also appealed to Banerjee to withdraw her fast as "life is precious". A letter from Manmohan Singh was faxed to Gopalkrishna Gandhi, the then-Governor of West Bengal, and then it was immediately delivered to Mamata. After receiving the letter Mamata finally broke her fast at midnight on 29 December. In 2016 the Supreme Court declared that the acquisition of 997 acres of land by West Bengal's Left Front government for the Tata Motors plant in Singur was illegal.

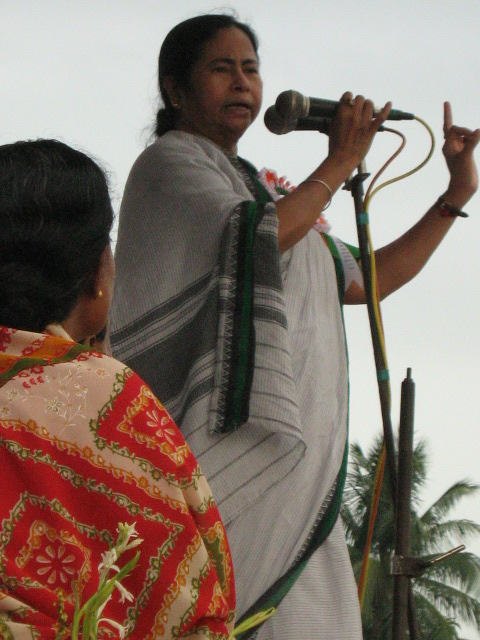
Mamata Banerjee speaking to the elected members and party workers at Bongaon stadium after the West Bengal panchayat elections

==== Nandigram protest ====
In 2007 a battalion of armed police stormed the rural area of Nandigram in the district of Purba Medinipur with the aim of quashing protests against the West Bengal government's plans to expropriate 10,000 acres (40 km^{2}) of land for a Special Economic Zone (SEZ) to be developed by the Indonesian-based Salim Group. At least 14 villagers were shot dead and 70 more were wounded. This led to a large number of intellectuals to protest on the streets. CPI(M) cadres allegedly molested and raped 300 women and girls during the Nandigram invasions.

Banerjee wrote letters to Indian Prime Minister Manmohan Singh and Union Home Minister Shivraj Patil to stop what she called "state-sponsored violence" promoted by CPI(M) in Nandigram. Her political activism during the movement is widely believed to be one of the contributing causes to her landslide victory in 2011.

The CBI report on the incident vindicated CPI(M)'s stand that Buddhadeb did not order the police to open fire. They did so only to disperse the unlawful assembly after every other standard operating procedure had failed. But supporting the violence in Nandigram by his own party workers, Buddhadeb Bhattacharya had said earlier "They (the oppositions) have been paid back in the same coin." There are allegations of involvement of some local TMC leaders in the Nandigram Violence.

=== 2009–2011 electoral progress ===
Before the 2009 parliamentary elections she allied with the United Progressive Alliance (UPA) led by Indian National Congress. The alliance won 26 seats. Banerjee joined the central cabinet as the railway minister (second tenure). In the 2010 Municipal Elections in West Bengal, TMC won Kolkata Municipal Corporation by a margin of 62 seats. TMC also won Bidhan Nagar Corporation by a seven-seat margin. In 2011, Banerjee won a sweeping majority and assumed the position of chief minister of the state of West Bengal. Her party ended the 34-year rule of the Left Front.

Trinamool Congress performed well in the 2009 parliamentary election, winning 19 seats. Its allies in Congress and SUCI also won six and one seats respectively marking the best performance by any opposition party in West Bengal since the beginning of the Left's regime. Until then, the Congress victory of 16 seats in 1984, was considered their best show in opposition.

==== Railway Minister (second tenure), 2009–2011 ====
In 2009, Mamata Banerjee became the railway minister for the second time. Her focus was again on West Bengal.

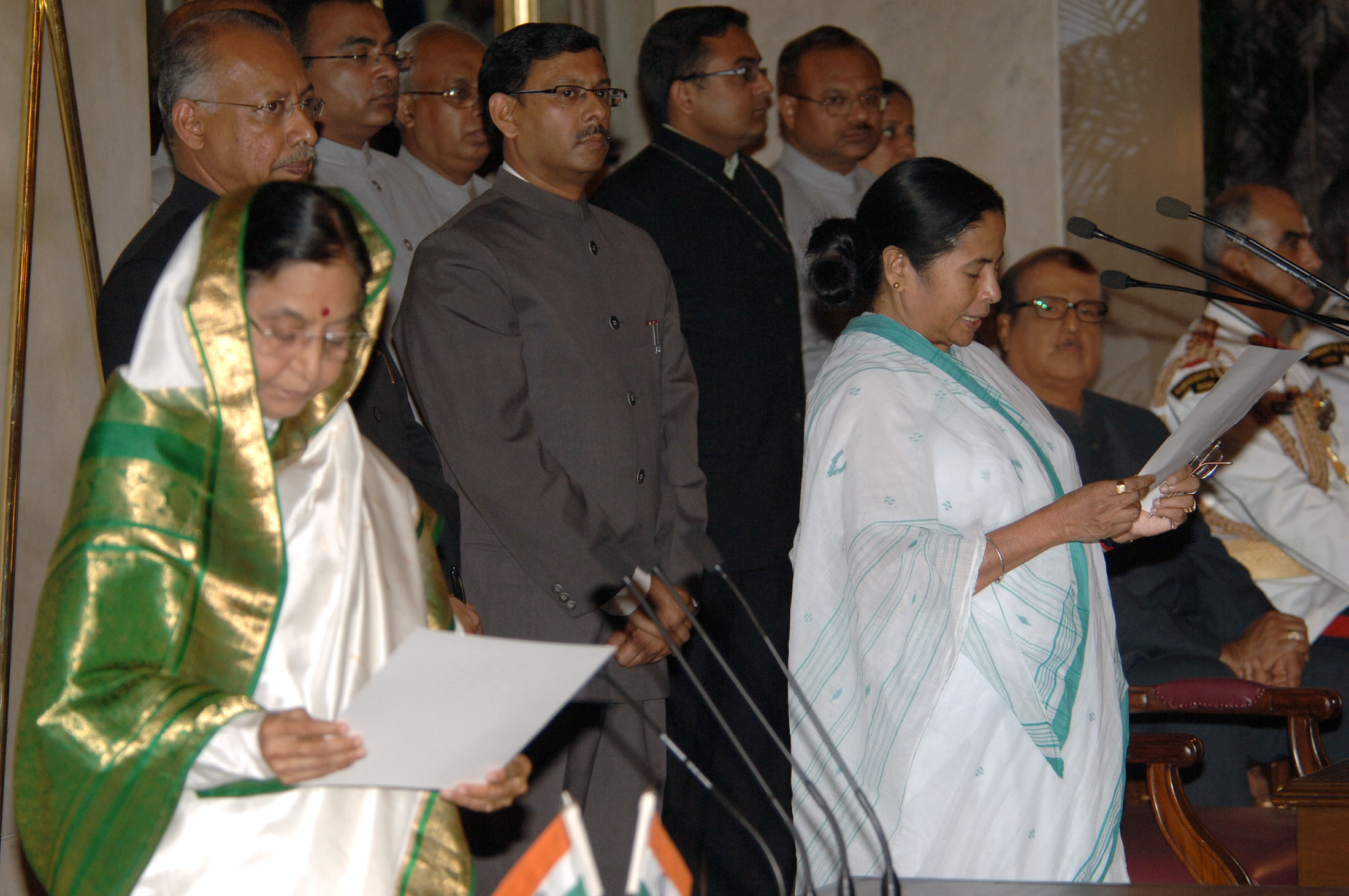
Banerjee swearing in again as Cabinet Minister at Rashtrapati Bhawan, New Delhi at 2009

She led Indian Railways to introduce a number of non-stop Duronto Express trains connecting large cities as well as a number of other passenger trains, including women-only trains. The Anantnag-Qadigund segment of the Jammu–Baramulla line that had been in the making since 1994 was inaugurated during her tenure. She also declared the 25 km (16 mi) long line-1 of the Kolkata Metro as an independent zone of the Indian Railways for which she was criticised.

She stepped down as railway minister to become the chief minister of West Bengal. She commented: "The way I am leaving the railways behind, it will run well. Don't worry, my successor will get all my support." Her nominee from her party, Dinesh Trivedi, succeeded her as railway minister.

Banerjee's tenure as railway minister was subsequently questioned as most of the big-ticket announcements made by her when she held the post, saw little or no progress. Reuters reported that "Her two-year record as railway minister has been heavily criticized for running the network into more debt to pay for populist measures such as more passenger trains." The Indian Railways became loss-making during her two-year tenure.

== Chief Minister of West Bengal (2011–2026) ==
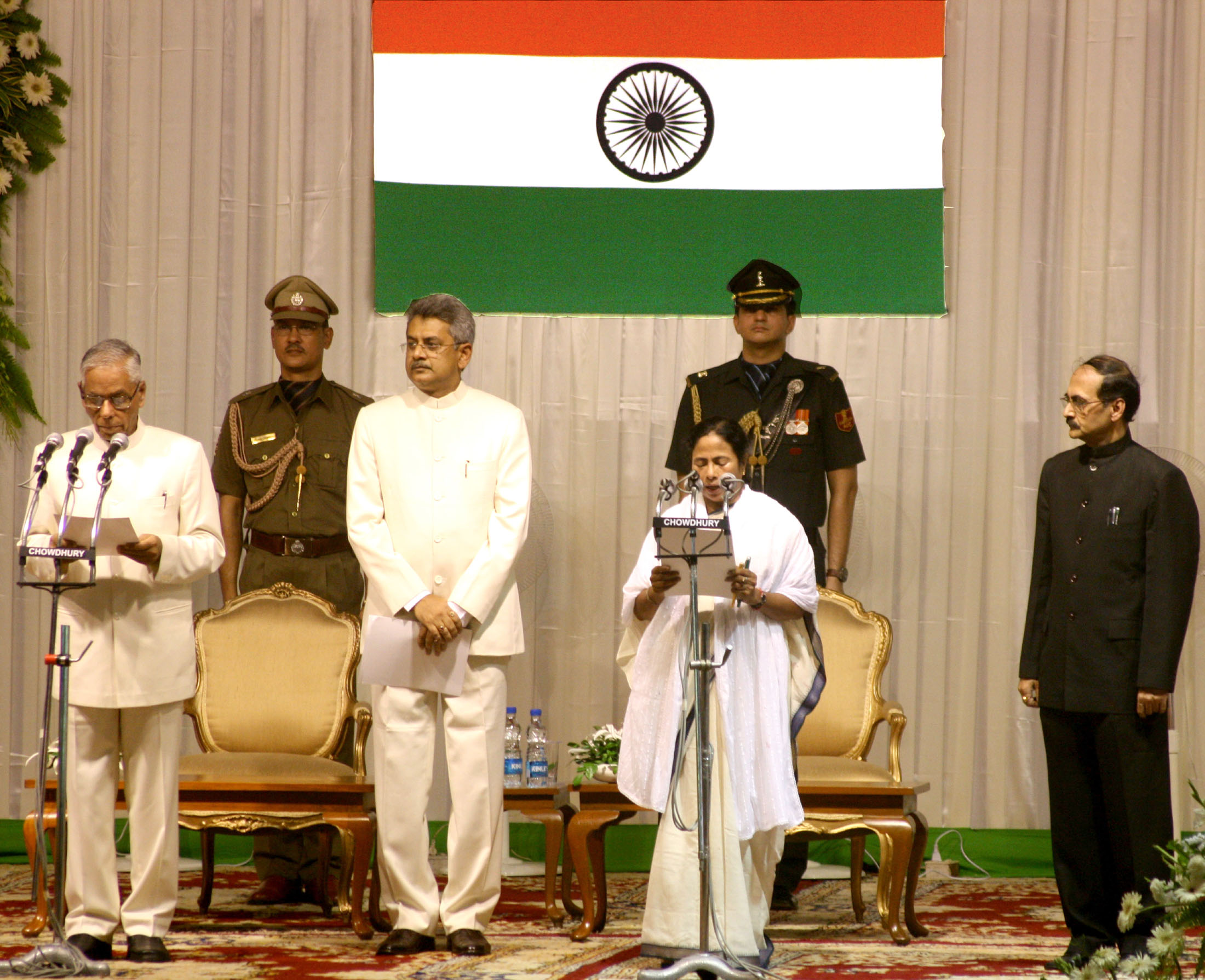
Banerjee sworn in as CM

In 2011, the UPA alliance of All India Trinamool Congress along with SUCI and the INC won the West Bengal legislative assembly election against the incumbent Left Alliance by securing 227 seats out of 294 contested constituencies. TMC had contested in 226 seats and won 184 seats, with the INC winning 42 seats from 66 contested seats, and the SUCI secured one seat. TMC saw a rise of 154 seats, Congress too by 21 seats. TMC secured 38.93% of votes while INC got 9.09% of total votes. This marked the end of the 34-year long Left Front government. The Left Front had governed West Bengal since 1977.

Taking the Oath at Raj Bhavan, Kolkata
Mamata Banerjee takes the oath of office as Chief Minister administered by Governor M. K. Narayanan on 20 May 2011.

Banerjee was sworn in as chief minister of West Bengal on 20 May 2011. As the first female chief minister of West Bengal, one of her first decisions was to return 400 acres of land to Singur farmers. "The cabinet has decided to return 400 acres to unwilling farmers in Singur," the chief minister said. "I have instructed the department to prepare the papers for this. If Tata-babu (Ratan Tata) wants, he can set up his factory on the remaining 600 acres, otherwise we will see how to go about it." After becoming Chief Minister of West Bengal, Mamata Banerjee regularly stayed late at Writers' Building, often keeping the state secretariat functioning well past 10 p.m. IST, compared to the previous government's 7:30 p.m. closing time.

She has also set up of the Gorkhaland Territorial Administration.

She began various changes in the education and health sectors. Some of these in the education sector included the release of teachers' monthly pay on the first of every month and quicker pensions for retiring teachers. In the health sector Banerjee promised: "A three-phase developmental system will be taken up to improve the health infrastructure and service." On 30 April 2015, a representative of UNICEF India congratulated the government for making Nadia the first Open Defecation Free district in the country. In a statement on 17 October 2012, Banerjee attributed the increasing incidence of rape in the country to "more free interaction between men and women". She said that "Earlier if men and women would hold hands, they would get caught by parents and reprimanded but now everything is so open. It's like an open market with open options." She was criticised in the national media for these statements.

She was also instrumental in the rollback of the petrol price hikes and the suspension of FDI in the retail sector until a consensus is evolved. In a bid to improve the law and enforcement situation in West Bengal, police commissioners were created at Howrah, Chandannagar, Barrackpore, Durgapur-Asansol and Bidhannagar. The total area of Kolkata Municipal Corporation was brought under the control of the Kolkata Police.

Mamata Banerjee at the Inaugural Address of 38th International Kolkata Book Fair (3:48)
Mamata Banerjee at the Inaugural Address of 38th International Kolkata Book Fair in 2014.

Banerjee had shown a keen interest in making the public aware of the state's history and culture. She named several stations of the Kolkata Metro after freedom fighters, and planned on naming upcoming stations after religious leaders, poets, singers and the like. Mamata Banerjee has been criticised for starting controversial stipends to imams (Iman Bhatta) which was ruled unconstitutional by Calcutta High Court.

On 16 February 2012, Bill Gates, of the Bill & Melinda Gates Foundation, sent a letter to the West Bengal government praising Banerjee and her administration for achieving a full year without any reported cases of polio. The letter said this was not only a milestone for India but also for the whole world.

In June 2012, she launched a Facebook page to rally and gather public support for A.P.J Abdul Kalam, her party's choice for the presidential elections. After he refused to stand for the second time, she supported Pranab Mukherjee for the post, after a long tussle over the issue, commenting she was personally a "great fan" of Mukherjee and wishing that he "grows from strength to strength".

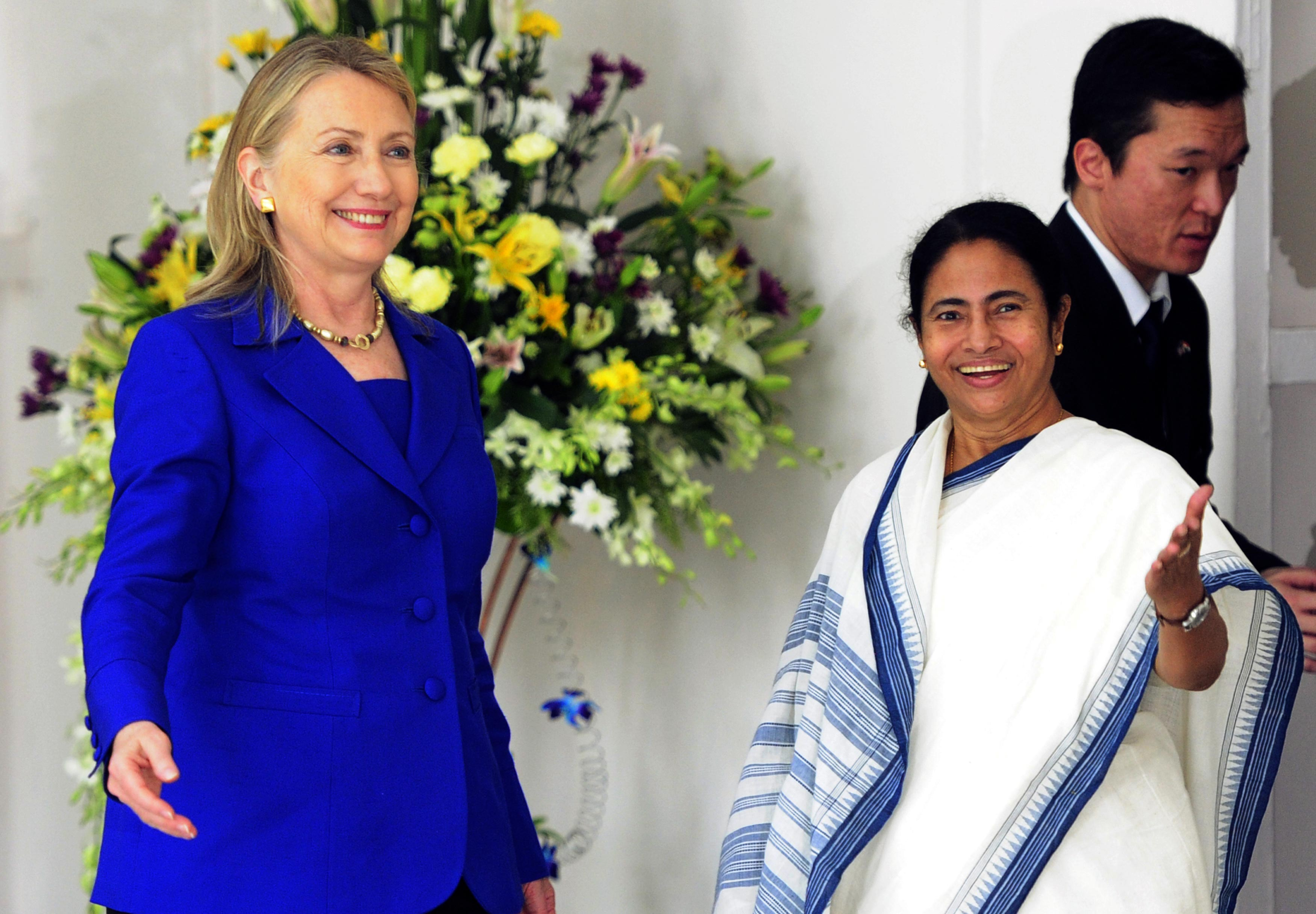
Then United States secretary of State, Hillary Clinton during a meeting with West Bengal chief minister Mamata Banerjee at the Writers', Kolkata on 7 May 2012

She is against calling bandhs (work stoppage) although actively supported them when she was in opposition.

Her tenure was also heavily marred by the Saradha Scam – financial embezzlement which led to the imprisonment of Madan Mitra – a former minister in her cabinet, Kunal Ghosh – a party MP, and rigorous grilling of several party men holding important posts. The Saradha Group financial scandal and the Rose Valley financial scandal came to light during her tenure and her painting being sold to the firms were being scrutinised by law enforcement agencies. One of her paintings was also sold to Sudipto Sen (central figure in the Saradha scam) for ₹1.8 crore (equivalent to ₹2.6 crore or US$280,000 in 2026), while 20 more of her pictures were seized from other Saradha Group shareholders. During her tenure she challenged the federal system of India when she ordered the arrest of CBI officials, who arrived in Kolkata to investigate the Saradha Group financial scandal. But CBI's attempted arrest of Kolkata Police Commissioner was also an attack on federalism.

In the 2016 assembly elections, All India Trinamool Congress won with a landslide two-thirds majority under Mamata Banerjee winning 211 seats out of total 293, who has been elected as Chief Minister West Bengal for the second term. All India Trinamool Congress won with an enhanced majority contesting alone and became the first ruling party to win without an ally since 1962 in West Bengal.

In 2017 Kanyashree Prakalpa, a scheme launched by her government, was ranked the best by the United Nations among 552 social sector schemes from across 62 countries.

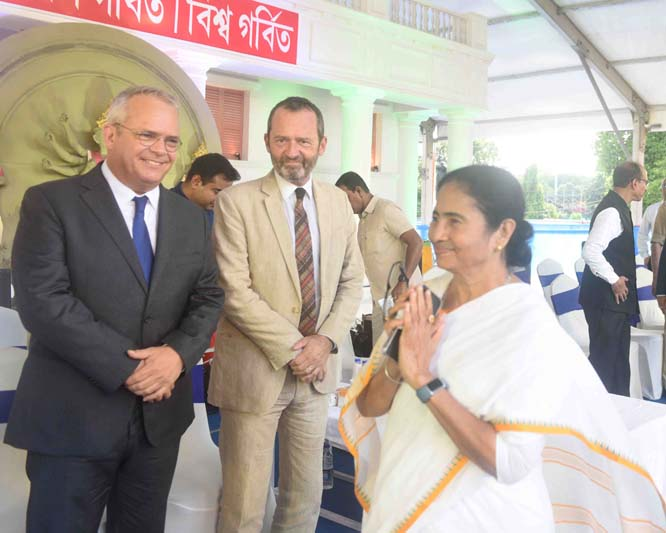
Banerjee with UNESCO officers Érik Falt and Tim Curtis, during a celebration over the enlistment of Durga Puja as an intangible cultural heritage, on 1 September 2022

In the 2021 assembly elections, AITC won with a landslide two-thirds majority. But, Mamata Banerjee who fought from Nandigram lost against Suvendu Adhikari of the Bharatiya Janata Party by 1,956 votes. Mamata Banerjee however challenged this outcome and the matter is sub judice. As her party won 213 seats out of total 292, she was elected as Chief Minister of West Bengal for the third term. Later at Raj Bhawan, she tendered her resignation to Jagdeep Dhankhar. She took oath as Chief Minister on 5 May 2021. Her party later won 2 remaining seats and she herself won Bhabanipur by-election by a huge margin of 58,835 votes. She was sworn in as MLA on 7 October.

Taking the Oath at Throne Room, Raj Bhavan, Kolkata
Mamata Banerjee takes the oath of office as Chief Minister administered by Governor Jagdeep Dhankhar on 5 May 2021.

After winning the election, following her promises she launched the scheme Lakshmir Bhandar. In this scheme women under the age of 60 were provided the basic financial help, about 500 rupees for general and 1000 rupees to minorities. The scheme turned out to be a huge success as it became massively popular.

Another scheme was also projected under her leadership, Students Credit Card scheme, to give financial supports in loan to intellectual students who are unable to keep higher studies due to lack of money. The loan limit was up to 10 lakh rupees, under the nominee of government of West Bengal.

On 18 August 2025, Chief Minister Mamata Banerjee launched the Shramashree scheme, a rehabilitation initiative aimed at Bengali-speaking migrant workers returning to West Bengal following alleged harassment in certain other states. Under the scheme, each returning worker receives a one-time travel grant of ₹5,000 and a monthly allowance of ₹5,000 for up to one year or until they secure employment. Beneficiaries are also provided with Khadya Sathi ration cards for food security, Swasthya Sathi health insurance, and their children are enrolled in state schools; those without homes are offered accommodation in community kitchens. The scheme further includes skill assessment and training under the Utkarsha Bangla initiative, with job cards issued through the Karmashree scheme. A dedicated online portal and mobile app facilitate registration, and once registered, beneficiaries are issued identity cards to access these services. State outreach camps—Duare Sarkar and Amader Para Amader Samadhan(APAS)—have been designated as venues for enrolment and awareness campaigns to encourage participation in the scheme until early November 2025.

== Post-chief ministership ==
The All India Trinamool Congress lost the 2026 West Bengal Legislative Assembly Election to the Bharatiya Janata Party with Mamata Banerjee losing her seat of Bhabanipur to Suvendu Adhikari of the BJP. Banerjee declared the election as rigged and refused to resign, claiming she had won the election.

Banerjee's term ended as the West Bengal Legislative Assembly was dissolved upon the conclusion of its term by governor R. N. Ravi on 7 May 2026.

On 11 August 2026, Banerjee participated in a protest against BJP MP Nagendra Roy. However, during the protest, slogans were shouted criticizing Banerjee.

== Personal life and recognitions ==
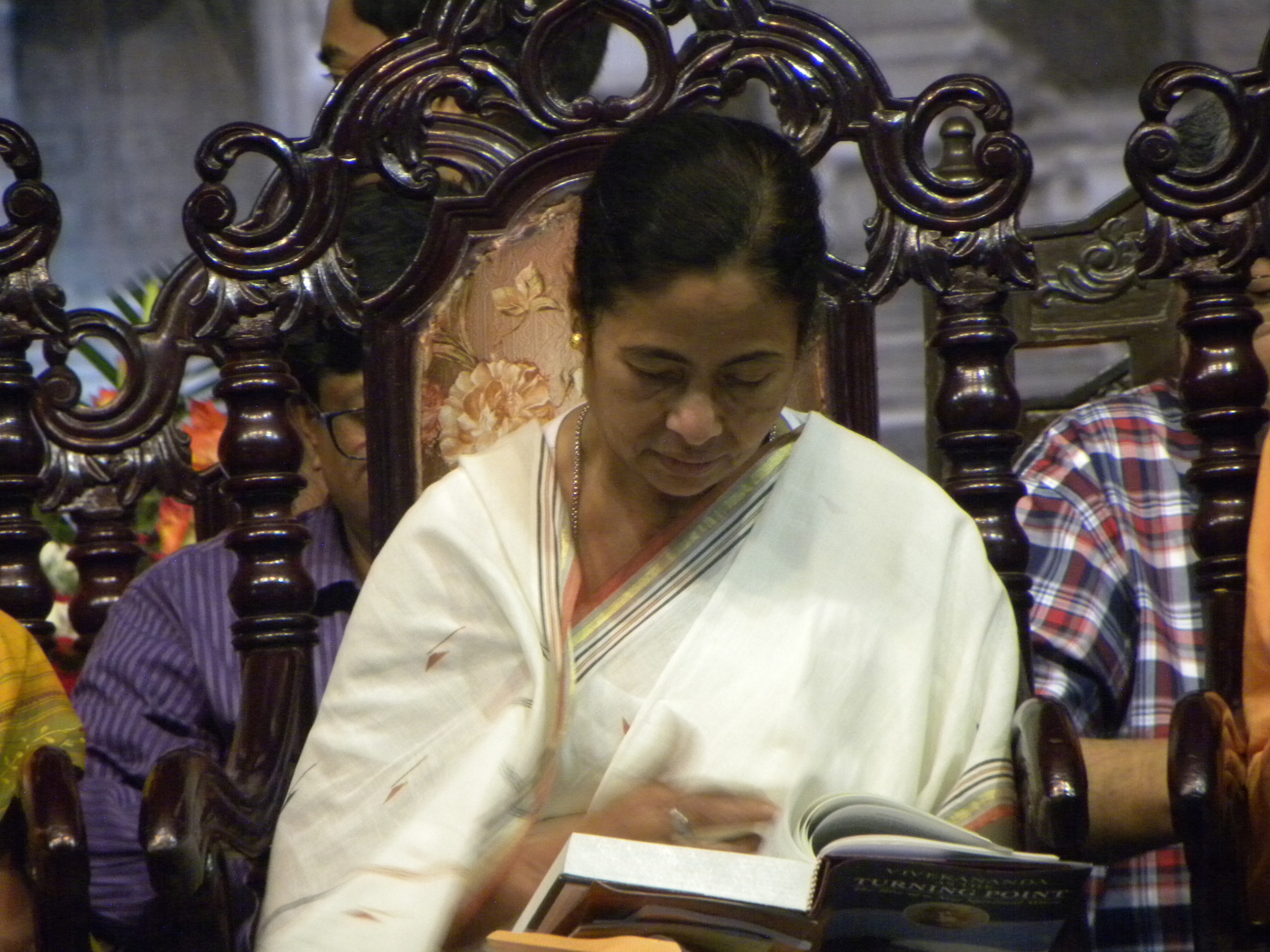
Mamata Banerjee at Ramakrishna Mission Vivekananda Centre for Human Excellence and Social Sciences, Rajarhat, New Town, Kolkata

Throughout her political life, Banerjee has maintained a publicly austere lifestyle, dressing in simple traditional Bengali clothes and avoiding luxuries. During an interview in April 2019, Prime minister Narendra Modi claimed that despite their political differences, Banerjee sends her own selected kurtas and sweets to him every year.

She identifies herself as a Hindu. Banerjee is a self-taught painter and a poet. Her 300 paintings were sold for ₹9crore (₹90 million, £990,000 or US$1,350,000). In 2012, Time magazine named her as one of the 100 Most Influential People in the World. Bloomberg Markets magazine listed her among the 50 most influential people in the world of finance in September 2012. In 2018, she was conferred the Skoch Chief Minister of the Year Award. Banerjee stepped out into the streets of Kolkata during lockdown, caused by the COVID-19 outbreak, to spread awareness among the common people. While appealing for maintaining religious harmony, Banerjee has reiterated the fact on numerous occasions that "Religion is personal, but festivals are universal."

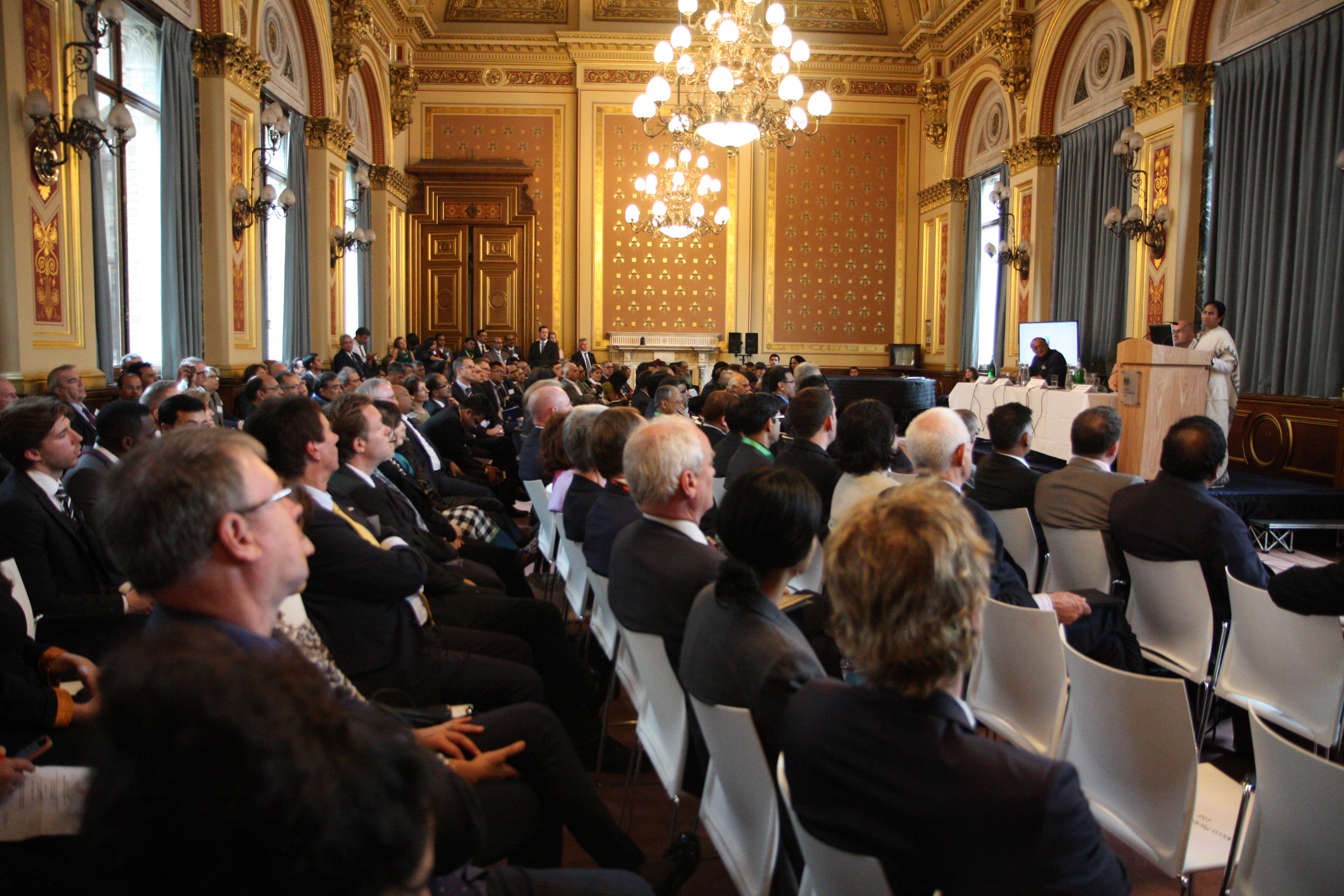
Mamata Banerjee, Chief Minister Government of West Bengal speaking at an event in London

She received an Honorary D.Litt. in Literature from St. Xavier's University on 6 February 2023 and another from Calcutta University on 12 January 2018. She also received an honorary doctorate from the Kalinga Institute of Industrial Technology, a Bhubaneswar-based deemed university.

In 2021, Mamata Banerjee was invited to attend World Meeting for Peace in Rome. She was the only Indian invited to attend the event. But in September, the Union Ministry of External Affairs (MEA) denied her permission to attend the peace conference stating that the event was not "commensurate in status for participation by the chief minister of a state". BJP MP Subramanian Swamy slammed Modi government on Banerjee's Rome visit cancelation. According to Indian Diplomat K. P. Fabian, the reason cited by MEA was unconvincing. Similarly, in December, Banerjee was denied permission by the MEA to visit Nepal.

TIME magazine published its annual list of 'The 100 Most Influential People of 2021' on 15 September 2021. The list includes Mamata Banerjee among others.

=== In popular culture ===
- Baghini, a Bengali film, inspired by Mamata Banerjee's life, was released on 24 May 2019. It is not a biopic.
- Former Trinamool Congress MLA Dipak Kumar Ghosh wrote a controversial book on her personal life, Mamata Bandopadhyayke Jemon Dekhechi. It creates critical response among the Bengali readers. A defamation case was also filed against Deepak Ghosh but the case has not been resolved yet. The controversial book was banned by an interim order of Civil Judge, Barasat Court on 22 July 2025.

== Works in arts and literature ==
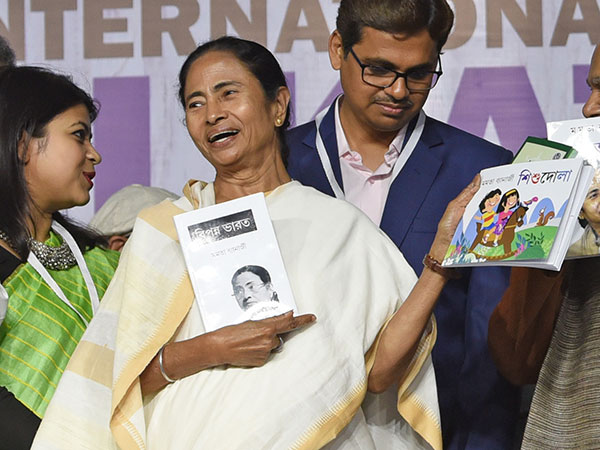
Mamata Banerjee at 43rd International Kolkata Book Fair with her books in hand

Numerous books written by her have been published so far. In 2022, she was given Paschimbanga Akademy Award for 'Kabita Bitan' which consists of 946 poems.

She is also a self-taught painter. Her paintings have also been auctioned several times.

She is also a lyricist and her compositions are mostly based on 'Durga Puja' and 'Motherland'. 'Maa Go Tumi Sarbojanin' sung by Shreya Ghoshal is one of her most popular songs.

== Electoral history ==
=== Lok Sabha ===
Year	Constituency	Party	Votes	%	Opponent (Opp)	Party(Opp)	Votes(Opp)	%	Result	Margin	%
2009	Kolkata Dakshin	AITC	576,045	57.19	Rabin Deb	CPI(M)	356,474	35.39	Won	219,571	21.8
2004	Calcutta South	AITC	393,561	51.1	Rabin Deb	CPI(M)	295,132	38.3	Won	98,429	12.8
1999	Calcutta South	AITC	469,103	58.26	Subhankar Chakraborty	CPI(M)	255,095	31.68	Won	214,008	26.58
1998	Calcutta South	AITC	503,551	59.37	Prasanta Kumar Sur	CPI(M)	279,470	32.95	Won	224,081	26.42
1996	Calcutta South	INC	438,252	52.5	Bharati Mukherjee	CPI(M)	334,991	40.1	Won	103,261	12.4
1991	Calcutta South	INC	367,896	52.46	Biplab Dasgupta	CPI(M)	274,233	39.1	Won	93,663	13.36
1989	Jadavpur	INC	410,288	46.67	Malini Bhattacharya	CPI(M)	441,188	50.19	Lost	-30,900	-3.52
1984	Jadavpur	INC	331,618	50.87	Somnath Chatterjee	CPI(M)	311,958	47.85	Won	19,660	3.02

=== West Bengal Legislative Assembly elections ===
Year	Constituency	Party	Votes	%	Opponent (Opp)	Party(Opp)	Votes(Opp)	%	Result	Margin	%
2026	Bhabanipur	AITC	58,812	42.19	Suvendu Adhikari	BJP	73,917	53.02	Lost	-15,105	-10.83
2021	Bhabanipur (by-election)	AITC	85,263	71.9	Priyanka Tibrewal	BJP	26,428	22.29	Won	58,835	49.61
2021	Nandigram	AITC	108,808	47.64	Suvendu Adhikari	BJP	110,764	48.49	Lost	-1,956	-0.85
2016	Bhabanipur	AITC	65,520	47.67	Deepa Dasmunshi	INC	40,219	29.96	Won	25,301	17.71
2011	Bhabanipur (by-election)	AITC	73,635	77.46	Nandini Mukherjee	CPI(M)	19,422	20.43	Won	54,213	57.03

== See also ==
- Ma Mati Manush
- Khela Hobe
- Didi Ke Bolo

== Notes ==
Lok Sabha
Preceded by Somnath Chatterjee	Member of Parliament for Jadavpur; 1984–1989	Succeeded by Malini Bhattacharya
Preceded by Biplab Dasgupta	Member of Parliament for Kolkata Dakshin; 1991–2011	Succeeded by Subrata Bakshi
State Legislative Assembly
Preceded by Subrata Bakshi	Member of the West Bengal Legislative Assembly from Bhabanipur, West Bengal Assembly constituency 2011 –	Incumbent
Political offices
Preceded by Ram Naik	Union Minister of Railways; 13 October 1999 – 15 March 2001	Succeeded by Nitish Kumar
Preceded by N/A	Union Minister without portfolio 15 March 2001 – 8 January 2004	Succeeded by N/A
Preceded by Ram Vilas Paswan	Union Minister of Mines; 9 January 2004 – 22 May 2004	Succeeded by B.K. Handique
Preceded by Lalu Prasad Yadav	Union Minister of Railways; 26 May 2009 – 26 May 2011	Succeeded by Manmohan Singh
Preceded by Buddhadeb Bhattacharjee	Chief Minister of West Bengal; 20 May 2011 – present	Incumbent
Party political offices
Preceded by office Established	President; All India Trinamool Congress; 1 January 1998 – present	Incumbent
