= Swami Vivekananda State Police Academy =

Police academy in West Bengal

- Former names: Police Training College, Barrackpore
- Motto: अथ्यासात् जयते नैपुण्यम्
- Motto in English: Excellence is won through practice
- Type: Governmental agency; Police training institution
- Established: 11 April 1948; 78 years ago
- Parent institution: Department of Home and Hill Affairs
- Affiliations: West Bengal Police
- Director: I.G. Akhilesh Kumar Chaturvedi, IPS
- Location: Barrackpore, West Bengal, 700120, India; 22°45′35″N 88°21′30″E
- Campus: 350 acres (140 ha); Urban
- Language: Bengali and English
- Website: svspa.wb.gov.in

The Swami Vivekananda State Police Academy (SVSPA), formerly known as Police Training College, Barrackpore, is the primary state-level police training institution in the Indian state of West Bengal. The academy is primarily responsible for recruiting West Bengal Police Service (WBPS) officers and train other sub-ordinate ranked and armed officers recruited to West Bengal Police. The academy is located in Barrackpore, Kolkata.

== History ==
Prior to the Partition of India in 1947, police training for the Bengal Presidency was primarily centered at the Police Training College in Sardah (later as Bangladesh Police Academy in Rajshahi District, Bangladesh). Following independence and the partitioning of Bengal, the historic Barrackpore Park estate was brought under the purview of the state police administration in 1947.

The academy, named as Police Training College (PTC), Barrackpore, was formally established on 11 April 1948. At its inception, the institution was headed by the rank of Superintendent of Police (SP).

In August 2011, to commemorate the legacy of Swami Vivekananda ahead of his 150th birth anniversary celebrations, the Government of West Bengal officially renamed the Police Training College as the Swami Vivekananda State Police Academy (SVSPA).

== Infrastructure ==
The academic campus is situated along the eastern bank of the Hooghly River inside the historic Barrackpore Park (now locally known as Latbagan), adjacent to Mangal Pandey Uddyan and approximately 1.25 km (0.78 mi) west of the Barrackpore railway station.

The academy also conducts pre-promotional training for officers for their promotion to the next rank besides conducting various short service training courses on different professional issues. It is well equipped with in-house faculty members both for academic indoor training and outdoor training. Besides, a number of eminent faculty members from different disciplines take classes for the training programs. These include academicians, scientific officers/experts from Central Forensic Science Laboratory (CFSL), lawyers, judicial officers and senior police officers.

== See also ==
- Rajasthan Police Academy
- Telangana State Police Academy
- Bihar Police Academy
- Sardar Vallabhbhai Patel National Police Academy
