= Siliguri Metropolitan Police =

Police commissionerate in West Bengal

- Abbreviation: SMP
- Motto: Courage Care Commitment

Agency overview
- Formed: 5 August 2012
- Employees: Commissioner of Police, Deputy commissioners, Additional Deputy Commissioners, Assistant Commissioners, Police Inspector, Sub Inspectors, Assistant Sub Inspectors, Police Constable
- Annual budget: ₹169.57 crore (US$18.1 million) (2025–26)

Jurisdictional structure
- Operations jurisdiction: Siliguri, IN
- Area: 640 sq mi (1,700 km^{2})
- Population: est. 10,20,000
- Governing body: Government of West Bengal
- General nature: Local civilian police

Operational structure
- Headquarters: Siliguri, West Bengal, India
- Elected officer responsible: Suvendu Adhikari, Chief Minister of West Bengal
- Agency executive: Shri Syed Waquar Raza, IPS, Commissioner of Police
- Parent agency: West Bengal Police

Facilities
- Stations: 08

Website
- siliguripc.wbpolice.gov.in

Siliguri Metropolitan Police, established in 2012, is a city police force with primary responsibilities in law enforcement and investigation within the certain urban parts of Siliguri, West Bengal. The Commissionerate is part of the West Bengal Police, and is under the administrative control of Home Ministry of West Bengal. It was formed after bifurcation of the Darjeeling and Jalpaiguri Police District, and has eight police stations under its jurisdiction. Shri Syed Waquar Raza, IPS (a IGP rank officer) has taken over charge of the Commissioner of Police, Siliguri Police Commissionerate .

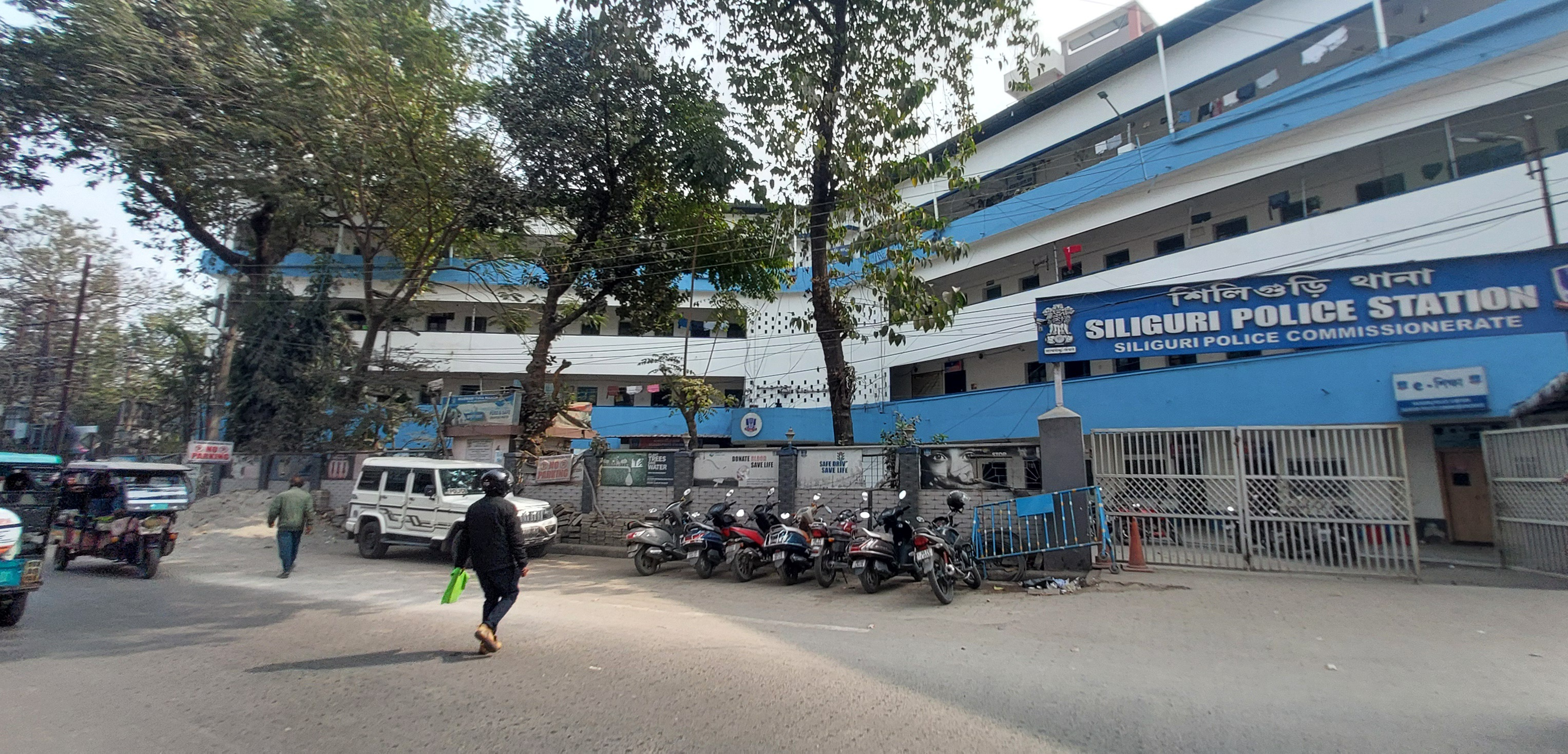
Siliguri Police station

== Police stations ==
- 1. Bagdogra PS
- 2. Bhaktinagar PS
- 3. Matigara PS
- 4. Pradhannagar PS
- 5. Siliguri PS
- 6. New Jalpaiguri PS
- 7. Cyber Crime PS Siliguri
- 8. Women Police Station PS

== See also ==
- Barrackpore Police Commissionerate
- Bidhannagar Police Commissionerate
- Chandannagar Police Commissionerate
- Kolkata Police
- West Bengal Police
