= Criminal Investigation Department (India) =

Crime investigation department Indian State Police

A Criminal Investigation Department (CID), also known as Crime Branch, is a specialized branch of the state police departments of India responsible for the investigation of crime, based on the Criminal Investigation Departments of British police forces. It's the specialised investigation wing of the state police, and headed by an officer of the rank of Director General of Police (DGP) or Additional Director General of Police (ADGP).

== Formation and organization ==
The first CID was created by the British Government in 1902, based on the recommendations of the Indian Police Commission, chaired by Andrew Fraser. At the entrance of the CID office at Gokhale Marg, Lucknow, there is a portrait of Rai Bahadur Pandit Shambhu Nath, King's Police Medalist (KPM) "Father of Indian CID". In 1929, the CID was split into Special Branch, CID and the Crime Branch (CB-CID).

Some states use different names for their CID units, despite the fact that many states use the term "Criminal Investigation Department". In Andhra Pradesh and Chhattisgarh, the CID is known as the Crime Investigation Department. In Assam, Bihar, Haryana, Uttar Pradesh, Rajasthan, West Bengal, Maharashtra, Karnataka and Jammu and Kashmir, it is known as the Criminal Investigation Department. In Delhi and Kerala, the CID is referred to as the Crime Branch, and in Tamil Nadu, it is known as the Crime Branch-Criminal Investigation Department (CB-CID). In Punjab, the Criminal Investigation Department (CID) is known as the Punjab Bureau of Investigation (PBI or BoI).

The Criminal Investigation Department (CID) is headed by an officer of the rank of Additional Director General of Police. The CID or Crime Branch has its own ranks up to the level of Additional Director General of Police, just as its counterparts in the law and order police. Senior officers in the Crime Branch include superintendents, deputy superintendents, inspectors, and sub-inspectors. In general, officers and men assigned to this wing prefix "detective" before their regular police rank.

=== CID branches ===
A CID may have several branches from state to state. These branches include:

- CB-CID
- Anti-Human Trafficking & Missing Persons Cell
- Anti-Narcotics Cell
- Finger Print Bureau
- Criminal Intelligence Division
- Anti-Terrorism squad
- Economic Offences Wing
- High-Tech Crime Enquiry Cell

== Crime Branch CID ==
CB-CID is a special wing in a CID headed by the Additional Director General of Police (ADGP) and assisted by the Inspector General of Police (IGP). This branch investigates serious crimes including murder, riot, forgery, counterfeiting and cases entrusted to CB-CID by the state government or the High Court.

== Jurisdiction ==
The State Crime Branch/ Criminal Investigations Department has statewide jurisdiction and investigates cases referred by the State Government, High Court, or the Director General of Police (Head of Police Force), including organized crime, inter-district cases, cybercrime, economic offenses, and high-profile or politically sensitive cases.

== In popular culture ==
Based on Mumbai's branch, a television series CID aired on Sony TV and Netflix with a successful run of 20 years.

== See also ==
- West Bengal CID
- Law enforcement in India
