= West Bengal Police Service =

Indian police service

- Service Overview
- Motto: Jivan Raksha, Samaj Raksha "Protection of Life, Protection of Society"
- Abbreviation: WBPS
- Date of Establishment: 1861; 165 years ago (as Bengal Police Service); 1952; 74 years ago (as West Bengal Police Service)
- Country: India
- Governing Body: West Bengal Police
- Staff College: Swami Vivekananda State Police Academy, Barrackpore
- Cadre Controlling Authority: Department of Home Affairs, Government of West Bengal
- Minister Responsible: Chief Minister of West Bengal (Home Minister, West Bengal)
- Legal personality: Governmental: Civil Service
- Duties: Law enforcement, Crime investigation, Public safety
- Selection: WBCS Exam
- Rank Structure: Dy.SP to Additional DGP (Promotion Post)

The West Bengal Police Service (WBPS) is the state police service of West Bengal, India. Officers of the WBPS serve under the jurisdiction of the West Bengal Police and assist the Indian Police Service officers in maintaining law and order in the state. WBPS officers are recruited through the West Bengal Civil Services examination.

== History ==
The origins of the WBPS trace back to the British-era Bengal Police, which was established in 1861 under the provisions of the Indian Police Act, 1861. After India's independence, the police service in West Bengal was reorganized, and the WBPS was formally constituted in 1952 to serve as the backbone of the state police administration.

== Recruitment and training ==
WBPS officers are selected through the West Bengal Civil Service Examination conducted by WBPSC. The selected candidates undergo rigorous training at the Swami Vivekananda State Police Academy in Barrackpore. After serving as DSP or ACP and Addl. SP or Addl. DCP respectively for 12 to 16 years in the WBPS cadre, officers are promoted to IPS with 2 to 5 years of seniority.

The training includes:

- Law and Order Management
- Criminal Procedure Code, Indian Penal Code, and Evidence Act
- Investigation Techniques
- Cyber Crime, Forensics, and Intelligence
- Disaster Management and Counter-Terrorism
- Physical Fitness and Weapon Handling

Rank in district police	Abbreviation	Rank in Commissionerate	Insignia
Deputy Superintendent of Police	DSP	Assistant Commissioner of Police	
Additional Superintendent of Police	Addl. SP	Additional Deputy commissioner of police	
Promotion to IPS
Superintendent of Police	SP	Deputy commissioner of police	
Senior Superintendent of Police	SSP	Deputy commissioner of police	
Deputy Inspector General of Police	DIG	Joint Commissioner of Police	framless
Inspector General of Police	IG	Additional Commissioner of Police	framless
Additional Director General of Police	ADGP	Special Commissioner of Police	

== Responsibilities ==
WBPS officers are responsible for:

- Law and order maintenance
- Crime prevention and investigation
- Traffic management
- Intelligence gathering
- Disaster response and emergency management
- Anti-terrorism and anti-naxal operations
- Community policing and public safety initiatives

== Difference between WBPS and IPS ==
While both WBPS and IPS officers work under the West Bengal Police, the key differences include:

- IPS officers are recruited through the Union Public Service Commission (UPSC) and serve across India, whereas WBPS officers are recruited at the state level.
- WBPS officers primarily serve within West Bengal, while IPS officers can be deputed to central government agencies.
- IPS officers hold higher leadership positions in the state police hierarchy, but WBPS officers also rise to senior ranks over time.

== Promotion to IPS ==
Usually, after 10–15 years of service in the West Bengal Police Service (WBPS), an officer may be promoted to the Indian Police Service (IPS). Upon such promotion, the officer’s salary is governed by the Central Government, and they become eligible for deputation to various central agencies and organizations. Furthermore, if a WBPS officer successfully qualifies in the departmental examinations at an early stage, the promotion to the IPS cadre may be achieved within approximately 6–7 years of service.

== See also ==
- West Bengal Police
- Indian Police Service
- Kolkata Police
- Law enforcement in India
