= Howrah City Police =

Police commissionerate in West Bengal, India

Howrah City Police হাওড়া শহর পুলিশ
- Common name: Howrah City Police হাওড়া শহর পুলিশ
- Abbreviation: HCP
- Motto: Courage Care Commitment; Bengali: সাহস সতর্কতা প্রতিজ্ঞাবদ্ধ

Agency overview
- Formed: 1 September 2011
- Employees: Commissioner of Police; Deputy commissioners Additional Commissioners; Assistant Commissioners; Police Inspectors; Sub Inspectors; Assistant Sub Inspectors
- Annual budget: ₹253.42 crore (US$27.1 million) (2025–26)

Jurisdictional structure
- Operations jurisdiction: Howrah, West Bengal, India
- Area: 301.429 km^{2} (116.382 sq mi)
- Population: est. 4,40,00,00
- Governing body: Government of West Bengal
- General nature: Local civilian police

Operational structure
- Headquarters: Howrah, West Bengal, India
- Agency executive: Shri Akhilesh Kumar Chaturvedi, IPS, Commissioner of Police
- Parent agency: West Bengal Police

Facilities
- Stations: Police Stations: 18; Traffic Guards: 8

Website
- howrahpolice.wb.gov.in

Howrah City Police (Bengali: হাওড়া শহর পুলিশ) established in 2011, is a city police force with primary responsibilities in law enforcement and investigation in Howrah city and some of its adjacent areas in Howrah district. The Commissionerate is part of the West Bengal Police and is under the administrative control of Home Ministry of West Bengal. It was formed after the bifurcation of the Howrah Police District and has eighteen police stations under its jurisdiction as of now. Presently, P. K. Tripathi, IPS is appointed as the Commissioner of the Howrah Police Commissionerate.

== Police Stations ==
1. Acharya Jagadish Chandra Bose Botanical Garden PS
2. Bally PS
3. Kadamtala PS
4. Belur PS
5. Chatterjeehat PS
6. Dasnagar PS
7. Golabari PS
8. Howrah PS
9. Jagacha PS
10. Liluah PS
11. Malipanchghara PS
12. Nischinda PS
13. Santragachi PS
14. Shibpur PS
15. Howrah Women PS
16. Cyber Crime PS
17. Sankrail PS
18. Domjur PS

== Traffic Guards ==
1. Bally TG
2. Dasnagar TG
3. Dhulagarh TG
4. Golabari TG
5. Howrah TG
6. Howrah Railway Station TG
7. Kona TG
8. 2nd Hooghly Bridge TG

== See also ==
- Barrackpore Police Commissionerate
- Bidhannagar Police Commissionerate
- Chandannagar Police Commissionerate
- Kolkata Police
