= Asansol–Durgapur Police Commissionerate =

Police commissionerate in West Bengal

- Common name: Police
- Abbreviation: ADPC
- Motto: Courage-Care-Commitment

Agency overview
- Formed: 1 September 2011
- Preceding agency: Burdwan Police District
- Annual budget: ₹211.09 crore (US$22.6 million) (2025–26)

Jurisdictional structure
- Operations jurisdiction: Asansol and Durgapur subdivision, IN
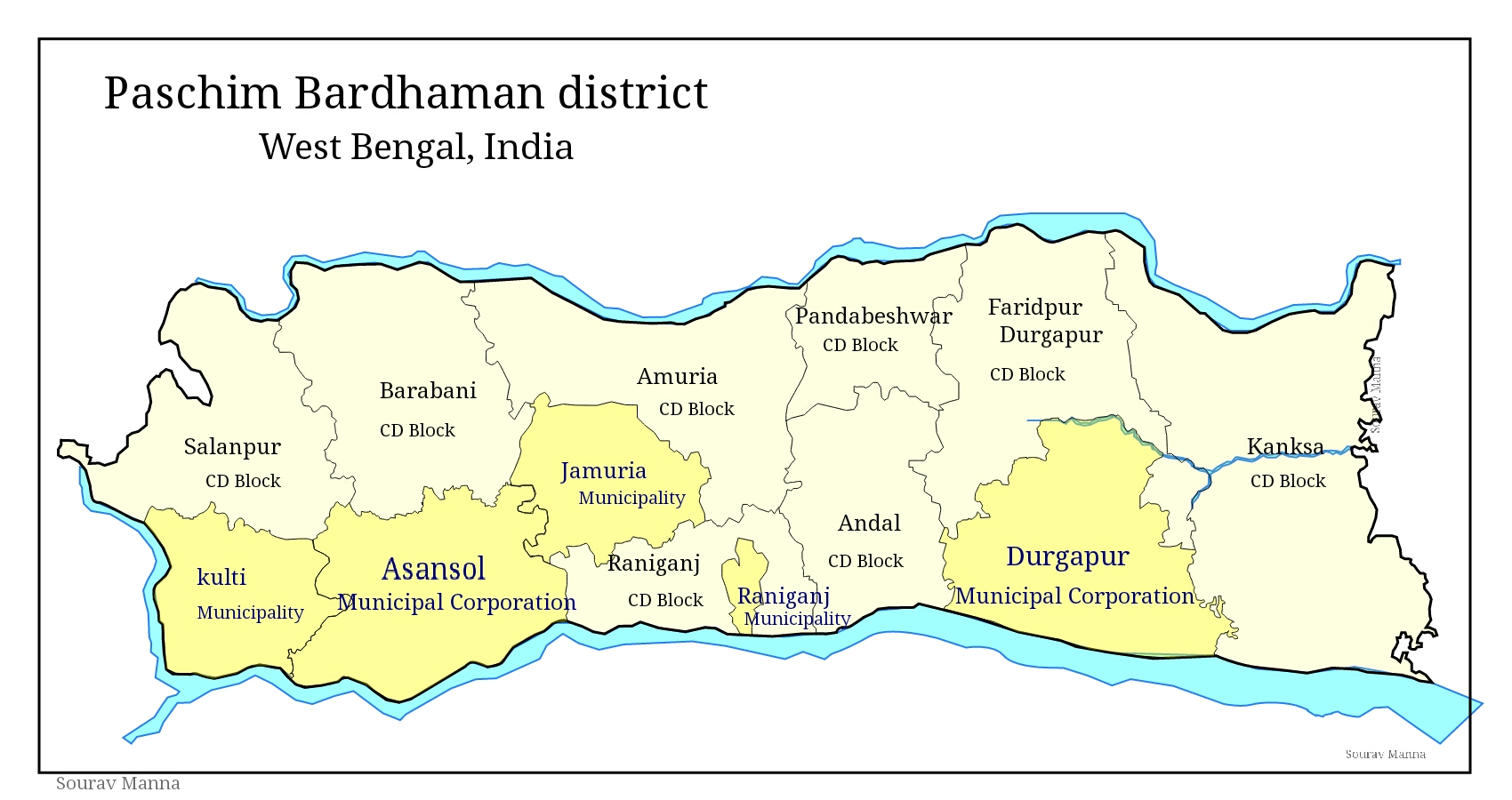
- Map of Asansol–Durgapur Police Commissionerate's jurisdiction
- Area: 1,870.50 sq mi (4,844.6 km^{2})
- Population: 29,42,978
- Governing body: Government of West Bengal
- General nature: Local civilian police

Operational structure
- Headquarters: Asansol, West Bengal, India
- Elected officer responsible: Suvendu Adhikari, Chief Minister of West Bengal
- Agency executive: Dr. Pranav Kumar, IPS, Commissioner of Police
- Parent agency: West Bengal Police

Facilities
- Police stations: 20

Website
- asansoldurgapurpolice.wb.gov.in

Asansol–Durgapur Police Commissionerate, established in 2011, is a city police force with primary responsibilities in law enforcement and investigation within the area which roughly constitutes the Asansol and Durgapur subdivision of West Bengal. The Commissionerate is part of the West Bengal Police, and is under the administrative control of Home Ministry of West Bengal. Asansol–Durgapur Police Commissionerate carved out from the undivided district of Burdwan, West Bengal, and has 20 police stations of Burdwan district under its jurisdiction. Ajay Nand was the first Commissioner of the Asansol – Durgapur Police Commissionerate. Now, it is headed by Dr. Pranav Kumar.

== Structure and jurisdiction ==
Office of Asansol Durgapur Police Commissionerate

The Police commissionerate is headquartered at Asansol, and is divided into three divisions – East Division, West Division and Central Divisions. The commissionerate is responsible for law enforcement over an area of Asansol and Durgapur subdivision of West Bengal with the help of 20 police stations under it. The commissionerate is headed by the Commissioner of Police, who is an Indian Police Service officer in the rank of Deputy- Inspector General(DIG). The commissioner is assisted by a deputy commissioner. The three divisions are headed by three Deputy Commissioners. Other departments, including the detective department and the traffic wing are headed by Assistant commissioners, who are in the rank of deputy superintendent of police. The divisions are further divided into five circles, which are headed by a Circle Inspector. The police stations are headed by an Inspector.

=== Divisions ===
Central Division	East Division	West Division
Asansol (North) P.S.	Durgapur P.S.	Kulti P.S.
Asansol (South) P.S.	New township P.S.	Barabani P.S.
Asansol Women P.S.	Coke-Oven P.S.	Hirapur PS
Cyber Crime P.S.	Andal P.S.	Salanpur P.S.
Jamuria P.S.	Faridpur P.S.	Chittaranjan P.S.
Raniganj P.S.	Pandebswar P.S.	
	Durgapur Women P.S.	
	Kanksa P.S.	
	Budbud P.S.	

=== Branches ===
- Detective Department.
- Special Branch.
- Traffic Department.
- Armed Police.
- Enforcement Branch.
