= CID West Bengal =

Premier Investigation Agency of West Bengal

Criminal Investigation Department West Bengal
- Seal of the Criminal Investigation Department

- Flag of the Criminal Investigation Department

Agency overview
- Formed: 1 April 1906 (120 years ago)
- Jurisdiction: Government of West Bengal
- Headquarters: Bhabani Bhaban, Alipore, Kolkata −700027; 22°31′42.23″N 86°5′44.66″E
- Motto: Fight Crime and Win
- Employees: IPS: 11; Additional SS: 2 DSP: 21; Inspector: 61
- Annual budget: ₹459.64 crore (US$48 million) (2025–26 est.)
- Agency executives: Director General of Police; Shri N. Ramesh Babu, IPS
- Parent department: West Bengal Police
- Website: cid.wb.gov.in

Criminal Investigation Department (CID) is the premier investigation agency of the State of West Bengal, India. In Bengal, Criminal Investigation Department (CID) came into existence on 1 April 1906 under Mr. C. W. C. Plowden. The first head of CID after Independence was H.N. Sarkar, IPJP. The Headquarter of CID is situated at Bhabani Bhaban, 31 Belvedere Road, Alipore, Kolkata. At present, CID West Bengal is headed by Shri N.Ramesh Babu IPS, Director General of Police.

== History ==
The Indian Police Commission in 1902–03 recommended constituting Criminal Investigation Department (CID) in every province and on 21 March 1905 the Government of India accepted the proposal of the Commission. The Government issued instructions to start the department in every province by 1907. In Bengal, Criminal Investigation Department (CID) came into existence on 1 April 1906 under Mr. C.W.C. Plowden.

== Divisions and Units ==
CID, West Bengal has several specialized units for investigation into special cases at its headquarters and 24 DD units throughout Bengal –

1. General Units/Section
2. Investigation Units
3. BDDS
4. Cyber Police Station
5. DD units
6. Specialized Units
7. Forensic Units
8. Administrative Units

=== Investigation Units ===
SL.NO	DD NAME
1	Homicide Squad
2	DRBT Section
3	Special Operation Group (SOG)
4	Railway & Highway Crime Cell
5	Cyber Crime PS
6	Narcotics and Special Crimes Cell
7	Economic Offence Wing (EOW)
8	Anti Cheating & Fraud Section
9	Protection of Women & Children Cell (POWC)
10	Anti Human Trafficking Unit (AHTU)

=== DD Units ===
- ALIPURDUAR D.D.
- ASANSOL & DURGAPUR D.D.
- BANKURA D.D.
- BARASAT D.D.
- BARRACKPORE D.D.
- BIRBHUM D.D.
- BURDWAN D.D.
- COOCH BEHAR D.D.
- DAKSHIN DINAJPUR D.D.
- DARJEELING D.D.
- DIAMOND HARBOUR D.D.
- HOOGHLY D.D.
- HOWRAH D.D.
- JALPAIGURI D.D.
- JHARGRAM D.D.
- MALDA D.D.
- MURSHIDABAD D.D.
- NADIA D.D.
- PASCHIM MEDINIPUR D.D.
- PURBA MEDINIPUR D.D.
- PURULIA D.D.
- SADAR D.D.
- SALT LAKE D.D.
- UTTAR DINAJPUR D.D.

=== Specialized Units ===
SL.NO	DD NAME
1	Finger Print Bureau
2	Special Control Room
3	Bomb Detection & Disposal Squad
4	Missing Persons Bureau
5	Cyber Forensics Training Laboratory
6	Photography Bureau
7	Cyber Crime Analysis Cell
8	NCRP & Other Portal Cell
9	Cyber Data Cell
10	Cyber Co-ordination Cell

=== Forensic Units ===
SL.NO	DD NAME
1	Questioned Document Examination Bureau
2	Cyber Forensics & Digital Evidence Examiners' Laboratory

== Notable cases ==
CID West Bengal has investigated several high-profile cases alongside its routine law enforcement responsibilities.

=== Fake doctors case ===
In April 2017 the West Bengal Medical Council tipped of West Bengal CID that several fake doctors were operating in Bengal and requested them investigate. Investigation revealed that most of the arrested fake doctors were attached to some of the well-known hospitals in the state including Kothari Medical, Belle Vue Clinic. One of the prominent fake doctor was Amit Roy Chowdhury a resident of Becharam Chatterjee Road, Behala, who was attached with BNR hospital by giving false medical certificate By June 2017 over 500 fake doctors had been identified. Following this several arrests have been made and West Bengal CID along with the state health department are planning to launch an app to spot fake doctors. Fake medical institutes and medical colleges were also sealed.

=== Baby trafficking sale case ===
The incident surfaced in November 2016 when evidence emerged detailing how one hospital was selling as many as 65 babies in one month with doctors admitting they have been involved in the trade for decades. Eight months after the case was detected, cops now claim as many as 150 hospitals are involved in this racket. The investigation led to findings related to as many as 10,000 babies changing hands illegally. Evidence led to orphanages illegally selling babies in America.

=== Blue Whale game case ===
During the Blue Whale game outbreak in India, West Bengal CID held awareness campaigns as well as saved an engineering student from risking his life in suicide.

== See also ==
- West Bengal Police
- Kolkata Police
- National Investigation Agency
- Crime Investigation Department India (CID India)
