= Chandannagar Police Commissionerate =

Police commissionerate in West Bengal

- Common name: Police
- Abbreviation: CPC
- Motto: English: Courage Care Commitment; Bengali: সাহস সতর্কতা প্রতিজ্ঞাবদ্ধ

Agency overview
- Formed: 30 June 2017
- Employees: Commissioner of Police; Deputy commissioners Additional Commissioners; Assistant Commissioners; Police Inspectors; Sub Inspectors; Assistant Sub Inspectors
- Annual budget: ₹142.90 crore (US$15.3 million) (2025–26)

Jurisdictional structure
- Operations jurisdiction: IN
- Legal jurisdiction: Chandannagar, Dankuni, Chinsurah, Bhadreswar, Serampore, Rishra, Konnagar, Uttarpara
- Governing body: Government of West Bengal
- General nature: Local civilian police

Operational structure
- Headquarters: Chinsurah, Hooghly, West Bengal
- Elected officer responsible: Suvendu Adhikari, Chief Minister of West Bengal
- Agency executive: Arnab Ghosh, IPS, Commissioner of Police
- Parent agency: West Bengal Police

Facilities
- Stations: 7 (Police Stations); 2 Women PS

Website
- chandannagarpolice.wb.gov.in

Chandannagar Police Commissionerate established on 30 June 2017, is a police force with primary responsibilities in law enforcement and investigation within certain urban parts of Hooghly district. The Commissionerate is part of the West Bengal Police, and is under the administrative control of Home Ministry of West Bengal. It was formed after bifurcation of the Hooghly Police District, and has nine police stations under its jurisdiction. It was established by Mamata Banerjee, Chief Minister of West Bengal on 30 June 2017.

== Police stations ==
1. Bhadreswar
2. Rishra
3. Serampore
4. Chinsurah
5. Dankuni
6. Uttarpara
7. Chandannagar

== Women PS ==
- Chinsura Women PS
- Serampore Women PS

== See also ==
- Barrackpore Police Commissionerate
- Howrah Police Commissionerate
- Kolkata Police
