= Counter Insurgency Force =

Police tactical unit of West Bengal Police

- Active: 2010 – present
- Country: India
- Agency: West Bengal Police
- Type: Police tactical unit
- Role: Jungle warfare; Law enforcement; Counterinsurgency; Counter-terrorism
- Operations jurisdiction: West Bengal
- Headquarters: Garia, West Bengal, India
- Motto: Fight to Finish
- Abbreviation: CIF West Bengal

Structure
- Operatives: 1000+ personnel

Commanders
- Current commander: A K Nand, IPS; Additional Director General

The Counter Insurgency Force (CIF) is a Police tactical unit of West Bengal Police with headquarters in Garia. It was created by the West Bengal state government in 2010 along the lines of the Greyhounds in Andhra Pradesh to combat proscribed Naxalites and Maoists in the state. At least 1,000 personnel from the state armed forces have been given commando training prior to inclusion in the CIF. The original training center was located at Durgapur, but all training is now given at Salboni, both in Midnapore district.

Trainees are shortlisted from common recruitment procedures. IGP (Armed Police) Vivek Sahay was given additional charge as IGP (Operations) in the force, while Assistant Director of the Sardar Vallabhbhai Patel National Police Academy Ajoy Nanda has taken over as DIG (Training and Operations). Anil Kumar, IPS, is a part of the endeavor in the specific capacity of Spl IGP (Operations).

CIF is headed by Ajay Kumar Nand, IPS (ADG, CIF, West Bengal).

CIF was involved in the capture and killing during the firefight of a wanted Maoist—Mallojula Koteswara Rao, alias Kishenji—on 24 November 2011 after a 30-minute gunfight.

== See also ==
- West Bengal Police
- Manoj Verma
