= West Bengal Police =

Law enforcement agency responsible for West Bengal

West Bengal Police পশ্চিমবঙ্গ পুলিশ
- Crest of West Bengal Police

- Flag of West Bengal Police
- Common name: Police
- Abbreviation: WBP
- Motto: "We Care We Dare"

Agency overview
- Formed: 1861; 165 years ago
- Employees: 1,11,032
- Annual budget: ₹12,845.22 crore (US$1.4 billion) (FY2026–27 est.)

Jurisdictional structure
- Operations jurisdiction: West Bengal, India
- Jurisdiction of the West Bengal Police
- Area: 88,752 km^{2} (34,267 sq mi)
- Population: 91,347,736 (2011)
- Legal jurisdiction: West Bengal
- Governing body: Department of Home and Hill Affairs
- Constituting instrument: The West Bengal Police Act, 1952
- General nature: Gendarmerie; Local civilian police

Operational structure
- Headquarters: Bhabani Bhawan, Alipore, Kolkata, West Bengal
- Gazetted Officers: 200 IPS officers
- Minister responsible: Suvendu Adhikari, Department of Home and Hill Affairs of West Bengal
- Agency executive: Siddh Nath Gupta (acting), IPS, Director General of Police
- Child agencies: CID West Bengal; Counter Insurgency Force (CIF); Eastern Frontier Rifles; Special Task Force; Specially Trained Armed Company; Bengal Marine Police; Indian Reserve Battalions (IRBn)
- City units: Asansol–Durgapur Police Commissionerate; Barrackpore Police Commissionerate; Bidhannagar City Police; Chandannagar Police Commissionerate; Howrah City Police; Siliguri Metropolitan Police

Facilities
- Police Stations: 516
- Vehicle types: Harley-Davidson Street 750; TATA Nexon.ev; Mahindra TUV 300; Mahindra Rakshak; Mahindra Marksman
- Vessels: 7
- Jetties: 4
- Dogs: 60

Website
- wbpolice.gov.in

The West Bengal Police (Bengali: পশ্চিমবঙ্গ পুলিশ) is the primary law enforcement agency for the Indian state of West Bengal, excluding the metropolitan area of Kolkata, which has its own separate police force. It is responsible for maintaining public order, preventing and investigating crimes, and ensuring the safety and security of citizens across the state. Established under the Police Act, 1861, the force operates under the administrative control of the Department of Home and Hill Affairs of Government of West Bengal.

The West Bengal Police was reorganised under provisions of the Police Act 1861 during the British Raj. It is headed by an officer designated as the Director General of Police who reports to the State Government through the Home (Police) Department. Shri Siddh Nath Gupta, an IPS officer of the 1992 batch is the acting DGP of West Bengal Police since 17 March 2026.

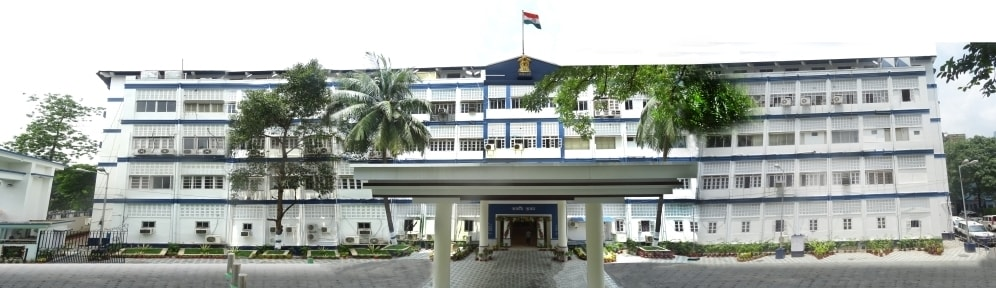
West Bengal Police Head Quarters

The West Bengal Police has jurisdiction concurrent with the twenty-two revenue districts of the State (excluding the metropolitan city of Kolkata) which comprises one of the two general police districts of West Bengal under the Police Act 1861. The other general police district consists of the major portions of the metropolitan area of Kolkata, and has a separate police force (Kolkata Police Commissionerate) constituted and administered under the Calcutta Police Act 1866 & Calcutta (Suburban Police) Act 1866. This arrangement, unique in India, was conceived during colonial times when Calcutta was the capital of British India. The city police have been kept independent of the state police force.

== Organisational structure ==
West Bengal Police Ten Police Ranges in three zones and a Railways zone.

Zone	Ranges	Districts
South Bengal Zone	Presidency Range	Baruipur Police District; Diamond Harbour Police District; Sundarbans Police District; Howrah Rural Police
South Bengal Zone	Murshidabad Range	Krishnanagar Police District; Ranaghat Police District; Jangipur police district; Murshidabad
South Bengal Zone	Barasat Range	Barasat Police District; Basirhat Police District; Bongaon Police District
Western Zone	Burdwan Range	Hooghly; Purba Bardhaman; Birbhum; Hooghly
Western Zone	Midnapore Range	Paschim Medinipur; Purba Medinipur
Western Zone	Bankura Range	Bankura; Purulia; Jhargram
North Bengal Zone	Jalpaiguri Range	Jalpaiguri; Alipurduar; Cooch Behar
North Bengal Zone	Darjeeling Range	Darjeeling; Kalimpong
North Bengal Zone	Malda Range	Malda; Dakshin Dinajpur
North Bengal Zone	Raiganj Range	Raiganj Police District; Islampur Police District
Railway Zone	Eastern Railway	Malda railway division; Howrah railway division; Asansol railway division; Sealdah railway division
Railway Zone	South Eastern Railway	Kharagpur railway division; Adra railway division; Ranchi railway division
Railway Zone	Northeast Frontier Railway	Alipurduar railway division; Katihar railway division

=== Police commissionerates ===
A police commissionerate is a law enforcement body especially in the urban parts of the state. The commissionerate is headed by a Commissioner of Police. There are Six commissionerates under West Bengal Police for Urban Area policing. The Howrah, Chandannagar, Asansol-Durgapur & the Siliguri Police commissionerates are headed by Commissioner of Police (CP) who are of the rank of Deputy Inspector General of Police (DIG) while the Bidhanagar and Barrackpore police commissionerates are headed by Commissioner of Police of the rank of Inspector General of Police (IGP). In November 2017 the Government of West Bengal has proposed to set up two more police commissionerates at Haldia in East Midnapore and Kharagpur in West Midnapore to ensure better policing.

All these police commissionerates are under the direct control of Director general of police.

- Asansol–Durgapur Police Commissionerate
- Barrackpore City Police
- Bidhannagar City Police
- Chandannagar Police Commissionerate
- Howrah City Police
- Siliguri Metropolitan Police

=== Marine Police ===
Since the 2008 Mumbai attacks, the Government of India took the decision to strengthen coastal security and several important decisions were taken and launched a multi-tier arrangement for protection and maritime security of the country scheme. In April 2011, Government of India sanctioned 14 coastal police stations, surveillance equipment, computer systems, furniture and jetties for the West Bengal's share of the 157.50 km coastline under the Coastal Security Scheme Phase-II.

=== Organisational divisions ===
==== Zones ====
The police administration in the state is divided into three police zones and a Government Railway Police (GRP) Zone, each headed by an Inspector General of Police. Each Zone consists of one or more Ranges headed by an officer designated as the Deputy Inspector General of Police (or Special Inspector General of Police). In all, there are 28 police districts (including four consisting of Government Railway Police districts), each headed by a Superintendent of Police. The three Zones are South Bengal Zone, Western Bengal Zone and North Bengal Zone, and an office of the IGP Railways.

Besides, there are some other IGP ranked officers in the following department: Coastal Security, Fire & Emergency Services, Training, Provisioning, Armed Police (AP), Enforcement Bureau (EB), Administration, Law & Orders, Telecommunications, CID, Traffic, WBPRB, SVSPA, CIF, STF, Vigilance Commission etc.

==== Ranges ====
Each Range comprises two or more districts or one district divided into multiple police districts. The Range is headed by a Deputy Inspector General of Police (DIG). In West Bengal there are 10 ranges.

Besides, there are DIG ranked officers in the department of Traffic, Railways, States Crime Records Bureau (SCRB), CID West Bengal, Anti Corruption Bureau (ACB), AP Barrackpore, AP Eastern Frontier Rifles (EFR) Salua, AP North Bengal, AP Durgapur, AP Siliguri, Border, Enforcement Bureau (EB), Intelligence Bureau, Fire Services, Headquarter (HQ), Police Training Center (PTS), Training, Personnel & Weapon, Provisioning, Telecommunication, WBNVF, Civil Defence etc.

==== Districts ====
Each Police District is either coterminous with the Revenue district or in the case of Government Railway Police districts, is located within a number of revenue districts. It is headed by a District Superintendent of Police (or simply called Superintendent of Police). Each district comprises two or more Sub-Divisions, several Circles and Police Stations. But in recent times, several districts are divided into police districts for better police administration. Each of those police districts are headed by an SP.

==== Sub-Divisions ====
Each Sub-Division is headed by one Police officer of the rank Deputy Superintendent of Police (members of West Bengal Police Service, a directly recruited officer or one promoted from the ranks) or an Assistant Superintendent of Police (members of Indian Police Service). In West Bengal, the officer who heads a Sub-Division is known as SDPO i.e. Sub Divisional Police Officer.

==== Circles ====
A Circle comprises several Police Stations within a sub-division. An Inspector of Police who heads a police circle is the Circle Inspector of Police or CI.

==== Stations ====
A Police Station is the basic unit of policing, responsible for prevention and detection of crime, maintenance of public order, enforcing law in general as well as for performing protection duties and making security arrangements for the constitutional authorities, government functionaries, representatives of the public in different legislative bodies and local self governments, public figures etc.

A Police Station is headed by either a Sub-Inspector (lower subordinate rank), mostly in rural areas or an Inspector (an upper subordinate rank), mostly in urban areas. Police outposts are headed by a Sub-Inspector or Assistant Sub Inspector. After the year 2009 both ASI and SI have equal investigation power and both serve as duty officers.

== Criticism ==
The West Bengal Police was criticised and a section of the police station under their jurisdiction was burnt by the locals of Kultali, South 24 Paragnas due to the mishandling of rape of 10-year-old girl. It is alleged that they also harassed the parents of the minor while registering complaint and the locals and police indulged into a violent clash due to the underlying incident.

=== Failure to handle protest ===
Following the enactment of Waqf Bill widespread protest took place, but the police failed to restore peace in Murshidabad, the violence continued for several days claiming lives of many and damage of various public properties including railways.

Later on April 12, 2025, a special bench was formed to urgently hear a petition filed by Suvendu Adhikari, the Calcutta High Court ordered deployment of CAPF along with BSF to get situation under control.

== Police ranks ==
The Director General functions from the West Bengal Police Directorate, located in the Writers' Buildings, the State Government's main Secretariat in Central Kolkata. He is assisted by a team of senior officers from the ranks of Additional Director General & Inspector General of Police to Assistant Inspector General of Police (AIG — a post equivalent in rank and status to the Superintendent of Police). Officers of the rank of Deputy Superintendent of Police are selected by the West Bengal Public Service Commission through the West Bengal Civil Service (Executive & other services) examinations. In addition to this, the directly recruited Sub Inspectors of Police may also become Deputy Superintendent of Police on promotion.

The West Bengal Police maintains the following ranks:

Designation in State Police	Designation in Commissionerate	Abbreviation	Insignia
Director General of Police	Commissioner of Police	DGP or CP	
Additional Director General of Police	Special Commissioner of Police	Addl. DGP or Spl. CP	
Inspector General of Police	Additional Commissioner of Police	IGP (IG) or Addl. CP	
Deputy Inspector General of Police	Joint Commissioner of Police	DIG or Jt. CP	
Senior Superintendent of Police	Deputy Commissioner of Police (Selection Grade)	SSP or DCP	
Superintendent of Police	Deputy Commissioner of Police	SP or DCP	
Additional Superintendent of Police	Additional Deputy Commissioner of Police	Addl.. SP or Addl. DCP	
Deputy Superintendent of Police /Sub Divisional Police Officer	Assistant Commissioner of Police	DSP/SDPO or ACP	
Assistant Superintendent of Police	Assistant Commissioner of Police	ASP or ACP	
Police Inspector / Circle Inspector	Same in both state and city police	Inspector / CI	
Sub-inspector	Same in both state and city police	SI	
Assistant Sub-Inspector	Same in both state and city police	ASI	
Senior Police Constable (Unarmed division)	Same in both state and city police	Constable	
Police Constable (Entry level armed division)	Same in both state and city police	Constable	

== Organisation ==
The Police Manual of West Bengal Police was compiled and issued during British Raj and is known as the Police Regulations of Bengal (PRB), 1943 and with subsequent modifications and corrections, is the guiding source of internal Police Organization and Administration under its area of responsibility. The WBP is divided into a number of units:

=== Local Intelligence Unit ===
Post 2014 Burdwan blast, which unearthed Bangladesh-based militant group Jamaat-ul-Mujahideen Bangladesh, middle-east's terrorist group Islamic State and Pakistan's Inter-Services Intelligence terror module, the need for strengthening the local intelligence gathering mechanism was first felt. Following the incident the state govt has set up a new intelligence agency to counter terrorism, bust terror modules and invigilate suspicious movements in West Bengal and also to foil militant infiltration into the state.

=== Armed Police ===
The Armed Battalions consisting of State Armed Police (SAP), Eastern Frontier Rifles (EFR) and Indian Reserve Battalions (IRBn),

=== Civil Police ===
The Civil Police consists of the Criminal Investigation Department (CID), Counter Insurgency Force (CIF), Enforcement Branch (EB), Intelligence Branch (IB), Traffic Branch, Police Telecommunications, Training Wing, State Crime Records Bureau (SCRB) & Police Computer Centre (PCC).

=== STRACO ===
An elite force named Specially Trained Armed Company or STRACO has been created to combat insurgency & terrorism, posted in West Zone to fight Maoist guerrillas. WBP is raising another new "Counter Insurgency" force on the line of Gray Hound Special Force of Andhra Pradesh Police.

=== STF ===
West Bengal government created new directorate of the Special Task Force under West Bengal Police. The Special Task Force (STF) of West Bengal, formed around three years ago, to combat modern urban organized crimes - terrorism, organized gangs, illegal arms, ammunition, drugs and fake currency across the state is all set to get a police station of its own and a designated court.

=== SVSPA ===
The Swami Vivekananda State Police Academy (SVSPA) is the state level police training institution catering to the training needs of West Bengal Police and Kolkata Police. The Academy conducts basic training for DSP Probationers, Cadet Sub-Inspectors of both Armed & Un-Armed branches and Recruit Constables for West Bengal Police and also for Warders and Inspectors of Correctional Services, Sub-Inspectors and Sergeants of Kolkata Police. The Academy also conducts Pre-promotional training for Constables, Asst. SI's and SI's for their promotion to the next rank besides conducting various short in- service training courses on different professional issues. SVSPA is well equipped with in-house faculty members both for academic indoor training and outdoor training. Besides, a number of eminent faculty members from different disciplines take classes for the training programs. These include academicians, experts from Forensic Science Medicine, scientific officers/experts from Forensic Science Laboratory (FSL) & Central Forensic Science Laboratory (CFSL), lawyers, judicial officers and senior police officers.

== Recruitments ==
Entries are done at the following ranks:

1. Recruitments to the posts of Constables / Lady constables, Sub Inspectors and Lady Sub inspectors are done by West Bengal Police Recruitment Board.
2. West Bengal Police Service: Officers selected through West Bengal Civil Service (Group-B) etc., examination conducted by West Bengal Public Service Commission are appointed as Deputy Superintendent of Police.
3. Indian Police Service: Officers selected through Civil Service Examinations conducted by Union Public Service Commission are appointed as Assistant Superintendent of Police during their probationary period. Upon confirmation to the service, they are appointed as Additional Superintendent of Police.

=== Eastern Frontier Rifles ===
The Eastern Frontier Rifles are an armed police force of the WBP, the purpose of which is to control major law & order problems, communal riots and terrorist attacks. Many contingents of EFR are deployed in various disturbed areas of the State. However, in recent years the effectiveness of this force has been weakened by overuse and prolonged deployment at Police Stations for day-to-day law & order duties. The headquarters of EFR is at Salua, near Kharagpur.

=== Counter Insurgency Force ===
The specialised force of the CIF was raised by the Government following the worsening situation in the Jungle Mahals. The force was charged with the specific task of curbing presence of the maoists within the state. The force was allowed its own recruiting process so as to select the best men from within the force. The force is headed by an Additional Director General of Police ranked officer.

== Insignia of West Bengal Police (State Police) ==
State Police Services rank insignia
Insignia

Rank

Superintendent of police (Note: In an armed police battalion, the equivalent rank is "Commandant.)
Additional superintendent of police (Note: In an armed police battalion, the equivalent rank is Deputy Commandant)
Deputy superintendent of police (Note: In an armed police battalion, the equivalent rank is Assistant Commandant.)

Abbreviation

SP
Addl.SP
DSP/Dy.SP

- Note: Gazetted officers in State Police Services (SPS) begins from DSP and above.
- In the Indian Police Service (IPS), rank starts from Assistant Superintendent of Police (ASP), which is equivalent to DSP in state services.

== Equipment ==
Name	Country of origin	Type	References
IOF .32	India	Revolver	
Pistol Auto 9mm 1A	India	Semi-automatic pistol	
Glock 17	Austria	Semi-automatic pistol	
OFB 12 Bore Pump Action Gun	India	Shotgun	
9mm SAF Carbine 1A1	India	Submachine gun	
Heckler & Koch MP5	Germany	Submachine gun	
Colt XM177	United States	Submachine gun	
Lee–Enfield Mk III	India	Rifle	
INSAS rifle	India	Rifle	
L1A1 SLR	India	Rifle	
OFB Excalibur	India	Rifle	
AKM	Soviet Union	Rifle	
M16A2	United States	Rifle	
M4 carbine	United States	Rifle	
SIG SG 551	Switzerland	Rifle	

== See also ==
- Kolkata Police
- West Bengal CID
