= Bidhannagar City Police =

Indian police force

Bidhannagar City Police বিধাননগর সিটি পুলিশ
- Common name: Bidhannagar City Police বিধাননগর শহর পুলিশ
- Abbreviation: BDNCP
- Motto: Courage Care Commitment; Bengali: সাহস সতর্কতা প্রতিজ্ঞাবদ্ধ

Agency overview
- Formed: 20 January 2012
- Annual budget: ₹174.49 crore (US$18.6 million) (2025–26)

Jurisdictional structure
- Operations jurisdiction: Bidhan Nagar & New Town area, IN
- Area: 146.34 km^{2} (56.50 sq mi)
- Population: est. 15 lacs
- Legal jurisdiction: Bidhannagar Municipal Corporation; New Town, Kolkata (WBHIDCO Area) & Bidhannagar Constituency Area.
- Primary governing body: Government of West Bengal
- Secondary governing body: West Bengal Police
- General nature: Local civilian police

Operational structure
- Headquarters: Bidhannagar Police Headquarters, Sec-III, Salt Lake City, Kolkata - 700 106
- Elected officer responsible: Vacant, Minister of Home and Hill Affairs, Government of West Bengal
- Agency executive: Gaurav Sharma, IPS, Commissioner of Police
- Parent agency: West Bengal Police

Facilities
- Stations: 13 (Police Stations); 8 (Traffic Guards); 1 (Women PS); 1 (Cyber Crime PS)

Website
- bidhannagarcitypolice.gov.in

Bidhannagar City Police (Bengali: বিধাননগর সিটি পুলিশ), established on 20 January 2012, is a police force with primary responsibilities in law enforcement and investigation within Bidhannagar Municipal Corporation and certain adjacent areas in Greater Kolkata (Saltlake, Dum Dum Park, Lake Town, Bangur Avenue, Kestopur, Baguiati, Raghunathpur, Teghoria, Arjunpur, Kaikhali, Rajarhat, New Town, Dumdum/Kolkata Airport Area, Inside of NSCBI Airport, Gouripur, Michael Nagar, Ganganagar). The Commissionerate is part of the West Bengal Police and is under the administrative control of Home Ministry of West Bengal. Shri Gaurav Sharma is the current Commissioner of the Bidhannagar City Police. Shri Rajeev Kumar was the first commissioner of Bidhan Nagar City Police.

== Structure and jurisdiction ==
The Police commissionerate is situated at Bidhannagar and is divided into three geographical divisions: Bidhannagar Division, Newtown Division, and Airport Division. The commissionerate is responsible for law enforcement over an area of 146.34 km^{2} (56.50 sq mi) with 13 Police Stations; 8 Traffic Guards; 1 Women Police Station and 1 Cyber Crime Police Station under it. As like Kolkata Traffic Police, Only Bidhan Nagar City Traffic Police has traffic guards offices headed by an Officer-In-Charge. Bidhannaagar City Police is headed by the Commissioner of Police, who is an Indian Police Service officer in the rank of Inspector-General of Police (IGP). The city police commissioner is assisted by a joint commissioner at the headquarters and several deputy police commissioners handling the matters on law and order, traffic, investigations and intelligence. Other specialized departments, including the Detective Department and the Special Branch are headed by Additional deputy commissioners, who are in the rank of additional superintendent of police. The police stations are headed by an Officer-In-Charge, an Inspector rank officer.

== Police stations ==
- On 27 November 2019, 2 new police station Eco Park and Technocity was inaugurated after dividing New Town Police Station.
1. Airport PS
2. Baguiati PS
3. NSCBI Airport PS
4. Bidhannagar East PS
5. Bidhannagar North PS
6. Bidhannagar South PS
7. Electronics Complex PS
8. Lake Town PS
9. Narayanpur PS
10. New Town PS
11. Eco Park PS
12. Rajarhat PS
13. Technocity PS

== Specialised Police Stations ==
- 1.Bidhannagar Cyber Crime PS
- 2.Bidhannagar Women PS

== Traffic Guards ==
1. Airport Traffic Guard
2. Baguiati Traffic Guard
3. Narayanpur Traffic Guard
4. Rajarhat Traffic Guard
5. Bidhannagar Traffic Guard
6. Lake Town Traffic Guard
7. New Town Traffic Guard
8. Nabadiganta Traffic Guard
9. Eco Park Sub-Traffic Guard

== See also ==
- Howrah Police Commissionerate
- Kolkata Police
- Police Commissioner of Kolkata
