= Department of Home and Hill Affairs =

State government department in West Bengal, India

Ministry of Home and Hill Affairs

Ministry overview
- Jurisdiction: Government of West Bengal
- Headquarters: Nabanna (building), Howrah, West Bengal
- Minister responsible: Suvendu Adhikari, Chief Minister of West Bengal and Department of Home and Hill Affairs
- Ministry executive: Sanghamitra Ghosh, IAS, Additional Chief Secretary
- Child agencies: West Bengal Police; Kolkata Police; CID West Bengal; Counter Insurgency Force; Eastern Frontier Rifles; Special Task Force; Specially Trained Armed Company (STRACO)
- Website: home.wb.gov.in

Map
- State of West Bengal

The Ministry of Home and Hill Affairs, popularly known as the Home Department, is a West Bengal government department. It is an interior ministry mainly responsible for the administration of the West Bengal National Volunteer Force and Civil-Military Liaison, welfare of military personnel, RIMC admission test, scholarship to RIMC/NDA cadets, World War-II veteran pension, concessions to volunteer-members of Territorial Army, rewards to Gallantry/Distinguished Service Awardees.

== Ministerial team and senior officials ==
The ministerial team at the Home Department is headed by the Cabinet Minister for Home Affairs, who may or may not be supported by Ministers of State. The current Minister of Home and Hill Affairs is Suvendu Adhikari who is also the Chief Minister of West Bengal.

The department's administration is headed by an IAS officer of rank of either Additional Chief Secretary or Principal Secretary.

== Branches, Agencies and Cells ==
- Accounts Branch
- Arms Cell
- Brder Area Development Project Cell
- Bengal Translator's Office
- Border Management & Coastal Security Cell
- Census Cell
- Commissions of Inquiry Branch
- Co-ordination Branch
- Defence Branch
- E-Governance Cell
- Election Branch
- Financial Adviser Cell
- Foreigners & NRI Branch
- Freedom Fighters’ Pension Branch
- General Establishment Branch
- Hill Affairs Branch
- Home Guard Cell
- Human Rights Branch
- Internal Security Branch (Private Security Agency Regulation cell)
- Law Cell
- Police Establishment Branch
- Medical Cell
- Police Modernisation Branch
- Police Service Cell
- Press Branch
- Protocol Branch
- Public Grievance Cell
- Receiving Section
- RTI Cell
- SAARC Visa Cell
- Internal Security Branch (Secret cell)
- Vigilance Branch
- West Bengal Secretariat Library
- Gorkhaland Territorial Administration
- Kolkata Police
- Rajya Sainik Board
- State Election Commission
- State Forensic Science Laboratory
- State Human Rights Commission
- West Bengal Police
