= Ranjit Kumar Gupta =

Inspector General of Police of West Bengal
- In office September 1972 – July 1976

22nd Police Commissioner of Kolkata
- In office 1967–1971
- Preceded by: P.K. Sen
- Succeeded by: R.N. Chatterjee

Personal details
- Awards: Indian Police Medal

Military service
- Years of service: 1943–1976
- Rank: Inspector General of Police

Ranjit Kumar Gupta (often referred to as Ranjit Gupta) was Police Commissioner of Kolkata in the seventies and played a controversial role in tackling the Naxalite movement. He retired as the police chief of West Bengal.

== Career ==
Gupta joined the Indian Imperial Police, the predecessor service of the Indian Police Service, in 1943. He was trained along with Taslimuddin Ahmed, who remained a lifelong friend, but with whom he had a meeting only after the creation of Bangladesh; Taslimuddin was the IG East Pakistan before Bangladesh, during the military crackdown.

Between 1943 and 1967 he served in various capacities, including SDPO in Chittagong District (pre-independence Bengal), responsible for liaison with the Indian Army during the war. It was during this period that he made friends with Col. Cariappa, later the Chief of Army Staff of Independent India, and Captain Osmani, later the Chief of the Bangladesh Army. He was posted as SDPO, Serampore, when the war ended, and moved on to be Superintendent, Wireless, where he supervised the installation of the wireless system for the state and for the city of Calcutta alike, a system that has served both police forces since then, with modernisation as demanded. He then was DC, South, and took pride throughout his career on there not being a single casualty during the traumatic days of partition. Later, after stints as DC, DD, and then as DC, HQ, he was the youngest DIG, as the man in charge of the Northern Range. He went on (not in sequence) to be DIG in charge of Presidency Range, DIG Intelligence Bureau, and DIG, Armed Police, Training and Borders. The Armed Police at that time consisted of three battalions and the Industrial Area Reserve Force. Later he raised the 2nd Battalion of the Eastern Frontier Rifles. . He was the DIG (Border Police) during the Indo-Pakistani War of 1965.

In 1967, he succeeded another life-long friend, P. K. Sen, as Commissioner of Police, Calcutta, just as the Naxalite movement got into high gear. He played a controversial role in tackling the Naxalite movement. He was hated by not only the ultra-left radicals and human rights activists for his ruthless line of action, but also by mainstream politicians. However, his juniors held him in high regard, particularly for his integrity and strong character.

During the troubled Naxalite movement days, as Commissioner of Police, he worked directly under Govind Narain, who was the Union Home Secretary. Afterwards, he worked closely with the centre to restore the rule of law in West Bengal. He is particularly credited for the conduct of the elections in 1971. Quite often in the thick of controversy, he had trouble with the political establishment in April 1971 and proceeded on leave. He returned in 1972 as IG of West Bengal (then police chief; the post of Director General had not been created, and came in with his successor) and continued till July 1976. Thereafter, he retired prematurely.

Endowed with impeccable manners, he was a scholar and anthropologist. His original discipline at Presidency College was history, which he read under the legendary Susobhan Sarkar. It was noteworthy that he was the only contributor to the festschrift brought out to honour his old master who was not formally a practising academic; all the others were the biggest names teaching and practising the discipline of history in India.

Prasun Mukherjee, a senior police officer who served under him, in an obituary tribute said, "In the departure of Mr Ranjit Gupta, we have lost a person who had become a legend during his career, who was a born leader of a force, was confident of himself, trusted his juniors and identified himself with them so much that he called himself a Policeman and not a Police Officer."

== Death ==
Gupta died on 19 May 2012 at the age of 93.

== See also ==
- Manoj Verma
- Surajit Kar Purkayastha
- Anuj Sharma (IPS)
