= 2026 elections in West Bengal =

West Bengal, a state in India, will undergo multiple elections in 2026, including elections to Rajya Sabha (upper house of Indian Parliament), by-election to Lok Sabha (lower house of Indian Parliament), state legislative elections, local elections of Kolkata Municipal Corporation, the local civil body of Kolkata, the capital city of West Bengal, and multiple other by-elections.

== Political parties in West Bengal ==
The table below gives list of all political parties that are either recognized as state parties in West Bengal by the Election Commission of India or has at least one seat in either house of the parliament or the state assembly.

Political Party	Allaince	Recognition	Number of Seats		
Political Party	Allaince	Recognition	Lok Sabha (42)	Rajya Sabha (5)	State Assembly (294)
Bharatiya Janata Party	National Democratic Alliance	National Parties	12	0	65
Communist Party of India (Marxist)	Left Front	National Parties	0	1	0
Indian National Congress	MTMC-LEFT	National Parties	1	0	0
Mamata All India Trinamool Congress	MTMC- LEFT	State Parties	29	4	223
All India Forward Block	MTMC - LEFT	State Parties	0	0	0
Bharatiya Gorkha Prajatantrik Morcha	MTMC-LEFT	Unrecognised	0	0	1
Indian Secular Front	MTMC-LEFT	Unrecognised	0	0	1

== Elections for the Parliament of India ==
=== Rajya Sabha ===
All 5 seats of Rajya Sabha will undergo an election in 2026 where Members of West Bengal West Bengal Legislative Assembly will vote to elect 5 candidates to the Rajya Sabha.

Date of end of term	Date of elections	Before		After	
Date of end of term	Date of elections	Member	Political Party	Member	Political Party
April 2, 2026	March 16, 2026	Subrata Bakshi	AITC	Babul Supriyo	AITC
April 2, 2026	March 16, 2026	Ritabrata Banerjee	AITC	Koel Mallick	AITC
April 2, 2026	March 16, 2026	Mausam Noor	AITC	Menaka Guruswamy	AITC
April 2, 2026	March 16, 2026	Saket Gokhale	AITC	Rajeev Kumar	AITC
April 2, 2026	March 16, 2026	Bikash Ranjan Bhattacharya	CPI(M)	Rahul Sinha	BJP

=== Lok Sabha ===
Constituency	Before		Cause of Vacancy	Date of Elections	After	
Constituency	Political Party	Member	Cause of Vacancy	Date of Elections	Political Party	Member
Basirhat	AITC	Haji Nurul Islam	Death	TBD		

== Elections for the West Bengal State Legislative Assembly ==
2026 West Bengal Legislative Assembly election
- On or before 7 May 2026

All 294 elected seats in the West Bengal Legislative Assembly 148 seats needed for a majority
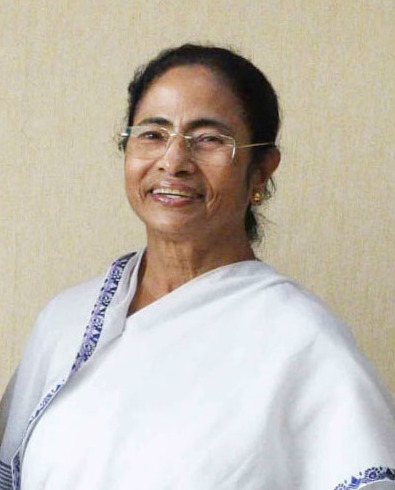

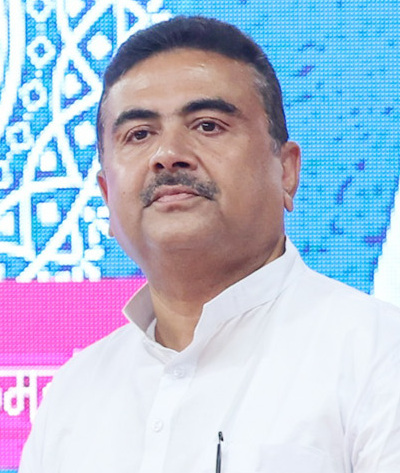
Leader	Mamata Banerjee	Suvendu Adhikari
Party	AITC	BJP
Alliance	TMC+	NDA
Leader since	1998	2021
Leader's seat	Bhabanipur	Nandigram
Last election	48.02%, 215 seats	38.15%, 77 seats
Current seats	225	65
Seats needed	Steady	▲83
- Map of the assembly constituencies in West Bengal
Incumbent Chief Minister
Mamata Banerjee
AITC

All 294 seats of the West Bengal Legislative Assembly will undergo elections in March/April 2026.

Before				Date of Elections	After			
Ruling		Opposition		Date of Elections	Ruling		Opposition	
Government	Chief Minister	Opposition	Leader of Opposition	Date of Elections	Government	Chief Minister	Official Opposition	Leader of Opposition
Party / Seats; AITC / 225; BGPM / 1; IND / 1	Officeholder / Party; Mamata Banerjee / AITC	Party / Seats; BJP / 65; ISF / 1	Officeholder / Party; Suvendu Adhikari / BJP	April 2026	Party / Seats; BJP / 207			

== Elections for Kolkata Municipal Corporation ==
All 144 wards of Kolkata Municipal Corporation, the largest civil body of West Bengal will undergo an election in December 2026.

Before			Date of Elections (tentative)	After		
Ruling		Opposition	Date of Elections (tentative)	Ruling		Opposition
Government	Mayor & Dep. Mayor	Opposition	Date of Elections (tentative)	Government	Mayor	Opposition
Party / Seats; AITC / 225; IND / 2	Office / Officeholder / Party; Mayor / Firhad Hakim / AITC; Dep. Mayor / Atin Ghosh / AITC	Party / Seats; BJP / 3; INC / 1; CPI(M) / 1; CPI / 1	December 2026	To be declared		
