= Rajesh Kumar (politician, former police officer) =

Indian politician (born 1966)

Dr. Rajesh Kumar
- Rajesh Kumar at the CP's office in Lalbazar

Member of West Bengal Legislative Assembly
- Incumbent
- Assumed office 4 May 2026
- Constituency: Jagatdal

40th Commissioner of Police, Kolkata
- In office 6 April 2019 – 26 May 2019
- Preceded by: Anuj Sharma
- Succeeded by: Anuj Sharma

Personal details
- Born: 26 January 1966 (age 60) Mukundgarh, Rajasthan, India
- Party: Bharatiya Janata Party
- Spouse: Pratibha Surolia (m. 1992)
- Relatives: Shyam Sunder Surolia (father)
- Education: Ph.D.; M. Com.; FCA; FCMA; MBA (Finance); MBA (HR).
- Alma mater: University of Rajasthan
- Other name: Rajesh Kumar Surolia
- Police career
- Service: Indian Police Service (IPS)
- Department: West Bengal Police
- Branch: Kolkata Police
- Service years: 1990—2026
- Rank: DGP (2020-2026); ADG (2014–2020); IGP (2007–2014); DIG (2005–2007); SP (1998–2005); Addl. SP (1994–1998); ASP (1993–1994); Probationer (1990–1993)
- Badge no.: 19901041
- Awards: PM (2010); CMPMOS (2017)

Dr. Rajesh Kumar Surolia (born 26 January 1966) is a politician belonging to the Bharatiya Janata Party and a former officer of the Indian Police Service (IPS). He is the elected representative of Jagatdal in the West Bengal Legislative Assembly. Previously, he held the office of Commissioner of Police, Kolkata for a brief period of time in 2019 during the Indian general election. He is also served as the Member-Secretary of the West Bengal Pollution Control Board (WBPCB).

== Early life and education ==
Rajesh was born on 26 January 1966, as the second child of Shyam Sunder Surolia and Draupadi Devi Surolia in the village of Mukundgarh, Jhunjhunu district, Rajasthan, India. He completed his schooling from the local school before moving with his family to Jaipur, the capital of Rajasthan, in the 1970s to pursue his further studies. He completed his master's in commerce from the University of Rajasthan in the 1980s before writing the examinations to become a Chartered Accountant.

== Indian Police Service career ==
Rajesh was selected as an officer in the Indian Police Service after passing the Union Public Service Commission’s Civil Services Examinations in 1989. He was a part of the 43rd RR training group at Sardar Vallabhbhai Patel National Police Academy in Hyderabad, Andhra Pradesh.

He was allotted the West Bengal cadre in the allotment lottery, and began serving in the State right after his training. Over the first 19 years of his service, he served in various capacities. He served as the Superintendent of Police in the districts of Murshidabad district and Howrah district before moving on to the Intelligence Bureau in West Bengal. He was sent on deputation to serve as the Financial Advisor of the Damodar Valley Corporation, before being sent to Delhi on Central Deputation in 2009.

From 2009 onwards, he served in various capacities in the UPA-2 Government, starting as the Private Secretary to the Minister of State for Urban Development, Shri Saugata Roy, before being appointed as an Officer on Special Duty to the Minister of Railways, Shri Mukul Roy in June 2012. Just 3 months into his tenure at the Ministry of Railways, the Trinamool Congress withdrew its support to the United Progressive Alliance leading to the resignation of all Ministers belonging to Trinamool Congress from the Union Cabinet. Shortly after, Rajesh joined as the Officer on Special Duty to the Minister of Culture, Smt. Chandresh Kumari Katoch, and continued in that post till 2014.

In 2014, after the NDA-2 Government came to power, he was appointed as an Officer on Special Duty in the West Bengal Resident Commissioner’s Office in the rank of Additional Director General of Police. In 2016, after the triumphant return of Ms. Mamata Banerjee as Chief Minister in the 2016 West Bengal Legislative Assembly election, Rajesh was recalled to the State and appointed as the Additional Director General of Police in-charge of the Criminal Investigation Department (CID).

In 2017, he was transferred as the ADG in the West Bengal Pollution Control Board before being appointed as the 41st Commissioner of Police, Kolkata, by the Election Commission of India in April 2019. On 26 May 2019, Anuj Sharma was reinstated as the Commissioner of Police, Kolkata, replacing Rajesh. Shortly after, Rajesh was appointed as the Member-Secretary of the West Bengal Pollution Control Board.

== Awards and recognitions ==
Rajesh was awarded the President’s Police Medal by the 12th President of India, Smt. Pratibha Devisingh Patil, on 26 January 2010. He was later awarded the Chief Minister’s Police Medal for rendering Outstanding Service by the Chief Minister of West Bengal, Ms. Mamata Banerjee, on 15 August 2017.
