= Rajeev Kumar (politician, former police officer) =

Indian police officer and politician

Rajeev Kumar PPM IPS (Retd.)

Member of Parliament, Rajya Sabha
- Incumbent
- Assumed office 3 April 2026
- Preceded by: Saket Gokhale
- Constituency: West Bengal

Director General of West Bengal Police
- Acting
- In office 16 July 2024 – 31 January 2026

Additional Chief Secretary, Dept of I&T, Govt. of West Bengal
- In office 25 December 2019 – 4 June 2025
- Appointed by: Mamata Banerjee
- Preceded by: Debasis Sen
- Succeeded by: Anup Kumar Aggarwal

37th Police Commissioner of Kolkata
- In office 21 May 2016 – 19 February 2019
- Preceded by: Soumen Mitra
- Succeeded by: Anuj Sharma
- In office 14 February 2016 – 12 April 2016
- Preceded by: Surajit Kar Purkayastha
- Succeeded by: Soumen Mitra

Personal details
- Born: January 31, 1966 (age 60) Chandausi, Uttar Pradesh, India
- Party: Trinamool Congress (until 2026); Mamata All India Trinamool Congress (from 2026)
- Education: B.E.
- Alma mater: Indian Institute of Technology Roorkee
- Police career
- Allegiance: India
- Department: Kolkata Police; West Bengal Police
- Branch: Kolkata Police; West Bengal Police
- Service years: 1990–2026
- Status: Active
- Rank: Director General
- Badge no.: 19891041
- Batch: 1989
- Cadre: West Bengal
- Awards: President's Police Medal for Distinguished Service; Police Medal of Meritorious Service; 50th Independence Anniversary Medal; 75th Independence Anniversary Medal

Rajeev Kumar (born 31 January 1966) IPS PPM is a retired Indian police officer and bureaucrat, who is currently serving as a member of the Rajya Sabha from West Bengal as a Trinamool Congress member. He served as the Director General of West Bengal Police, from July 2024 till January 2026. Previously he served in the same post from December 2023 until he was removed by the Election Commission of India in March 2024. Prior to his office, he also served as Additional Chief Secretary in Information and Technology Department of the Government of West Bengal from December 2019 to June 2025.

== Early life ==
=== Birth and education ===
Kumar is from Chandausi, Uttar Pradesh. He earned a Bachelor of Engineering in Computer Science from the University of Roorkee (now IIT-Roorkee). Kumar is the grandson of Moradabad's Gandhi and Professor Ramsaran (Ex Member of Parliament from Moradabad) and son of Professor Anand Kumar of SM Degree College, Chandausi, Moradabad. Kumar belongs to the Bania community.

=== Early police career ===
Kumar joined the Indian police service in 1989 from the Uttar Pradesh cadre. He also served as the Bidhannagar Police Commissioner and the Director of Special Task Force (STF), Kolkata Police.

== Kolkata Police (2016–2019) ==
He was briefly appointed as the Kolkata Police Commissioner from 14 February 2016 to 12 April 2016. In the 2016 elections in West Bengal, he was removed from the post by the Election Commission of India. He was later reinstated on 21 May 2016 and served until 19 February 2019.

== Later career ==
He was the Additional Director of Criminal Investigation Department, West Bengal from 20 February 2019 until December 2019. He was then promoted to Principal Secretary of the Department of Information Technology, West Bengal until 2023.

He was promoted to acting Director General of West Bengal Police on 31 December 2023 on the superannuation of Manoj Malaviya batch of 1988 IPS. He retired on 31 January 2026.

== Political career ==
On 27 February 2026, Kumar was announced as the Trinamool Congress party candidate from West Bengal for the 2026 Rajya Sabha elections to be held on 16 March. He was sworn in as the Member of Parliament of Rajya Sabha on 6 April 2026.

== Controversies ==
In 2019, Kumar was accused by the CBI in the Supreme Court of tampering with electronic evidence related to the Saradha chit-fund case. Though there is no accurate evidence against him. An estimated 1.8 million depositors from West Bengal, Assam, Chhattisgarh, Jharkhand and Odisha contributed an estimated Rs. 2,460 crore to the case. It was discovered in 2012 when depositors began reporting suspicious activity to the police.
