= Supratim Sarkar =

43rd Commissioner of the Kolkata Police

43th Police Commissioner of Kolkata
- In office 31 January 2026 – 16 March 2026
- Preceded by: Manoj Kumar Verma
- Succeeded by: Ajay Kumar Nand

Personal details
- Born: 30 May 1971 (age 55)
- Education: BSc
- Police career
- Service: Indian Police Service
- Department: West Bengal Police
- Service years: 1997–
- Status: Active
- Badge no.: 19971025

Supratim Sarkar is an Indian police officer who served as the 43th Commissioner of the Kolkata Police. Sarkar has previously served in several key positions in Kolkata Police, including joint commissioner (traffic) and joint commissioner (headquarters) and deputy commissioner (South). Sarkar also served in Special Protection Group (SPG).

== Early life and career ==
Born in 1971, Supratim Sarkar is a 1997 batch West Bengal cadre IPS officer.

Prior to his appointment as Commissioner of the Kolkata Police, Sarkar was serving as additional director general at South Bengal.

While serving as commissioner at Bidhannagar City Police, Sarkar was transferred following outrage over the Baguiati Double Murder case.

Sarkar is also a writer who penned numerous books.
