= Shyam Sunder Surolia =

Indian politician (1920–2001)

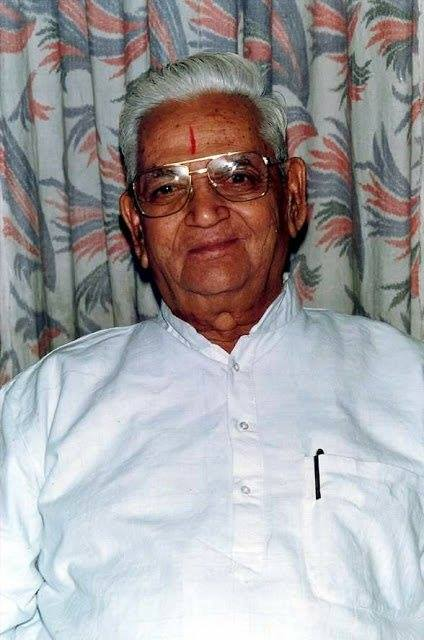

Chairman, Mukundgarh Municipal Board
- In office 1960–1963

President, Mukundgarh Town Congress Committee
- In office 1966–1985

President, All India Astrological Research Centre, Jaipur
- In office lifetime

Personal details
- Born: 25 August 1920 Mukundgarh, Rajasthan, India
- Died: 20 July 2001 (aged 80) Jaipur, Rajasthan, India
- Spouse: Smt. Draupadi Devi Surolia
- Children: Dr. Sarla Mukesh; Dr. Rajesh Kumar, IPS; Sanjeev Surolia; Sarita Vinay
- Education: Banaras Hindu University
- Website: Surolia.com

Pandit Shyam Sunder Surolia (25 August 1920 – 20 July 2001) was an Indian freedom fighter since 1934. Then a 14-year-old child, he raised his voice against the feudal powers of the state of Rajasthan.

== Early life ==
In 1939 he was sentenced by the Kushtia district court to six months in a juvenile home in Chuadanga, Bangladesh in British India for the offence of making bombs along with other young revolutionaries, highly moved by the ideals of nationalism and freedom struggle. In 1942, he became an active member of the Praja Mandal (Democratic Council) and the only elected member of the Town committee of Mukundgarh. He carried the wave of freedom struggle started by Indian freedom fighters such as Mohandas K. Gandhi and Jawaharlal Nehru to the neighbouring areas of Nawalgarh, Jhunjhunu and Dundlod among many other towns, often single-handedly but also in association with compatriots.

=== Work for the society ===
He was an active social servant and worked for the poor. His advent into politics was solely for this purpose. He served as the Chairman of the Mukundgarh Municipality from 1960 to 1963. Later, from 1966 to 1985, he also served as the President of the Mukundgarh Town Congress Committee.

He came in close contact with the leading social workers like Basant Lal Murarka and Bhagirath Mal Kanodia which further enlightened his spirit for social services. He started the Harijan Development Programme immediately after taking over as the Chairman of the Mukundgarh Municipality. He ensured the admissions of the Dalit students into schools. He also ensured that the benefits of various government schemes like scholarship, hostel facilities etc. for the wards of the down-trodden segment of the society. This was the time when the untouchability system was in vogue. At that time, it was considered a Brahmin do nothing for the neglected lower caste people. He was inspired by the ideals of Mohandas K. Gandhi and dedicated his life for the upliftment of the down-trodden, despite the severe resistance from his own caste and other high caste people.

=== Work as town committee chairman ===
During his time as Mayor, Mukundgarh was a very small municipality compared to the District Headquarters of Jhunjhunu and Nawalgarh. Due to his relentless efforts, the water works, telephone and the electricity system was first set up there and the bigger towns and municipality could get the same only after it. He implemented several long lasting works in Mukundgarh. He sanctioned the setting up of water supply systems, electrification of households, telephone system for better communication, concrete cement road in the main market, connectivity of the Mukundgarh town with the Mukundgarh mandi (community shop) and railway station which ushered in the overall growth of the town and opened several new vistas for future development and sustainable source of income for the Mukundgarh Municipality per se.

== Educational work and qualifications ==
He had a vast knowledge of Sanskrit and astrology. He was exponent of the Vedas, Shrimad Bhagvad Gita and Niti Shastra. His erudition in all these had earned him the epithet of Shastri. He had been the Founder of the All India Astrology Research Centre at Jaipur and remained the President throughout his life. He had also been associated with a large number of educational institutions due to his inclination towards creating a newer educated generation next.

== Personal life ==
He was married to Draupadi Devi Surolia in 1959, and the couple have four children, Sarla Mukesh, Rajesh Pratibha Surolia, Sanjeev Parul Surolia, and Sarita Vinay. He had started a small distribution firm in 1967, which had a good amount of annual turnover. Later the business was transferred to his youngest son after his demise.

== Late life and death ==
He was very popular in Mukundgarh and the nearby areas and people used to come to him for sorting out all kind of disputes amicably. The entire district administration and the politicians used to visit him only due to his charismatic personality and traits. He used to be popularly called as Shyamji in the area.

=== Death ===
He remained an active social worker till his death. He died on 20 July 2001, after a brief illness. As he was a freedom fighter, the state of Rajasthan honoured him with a state funeral.
