= Kolkata Traffic Police =

- Abbreviation: KTP
- Motto: Faster Safer Friendlier

Jurisdictional structure
- Operations jurisdiction: Kolkata, India
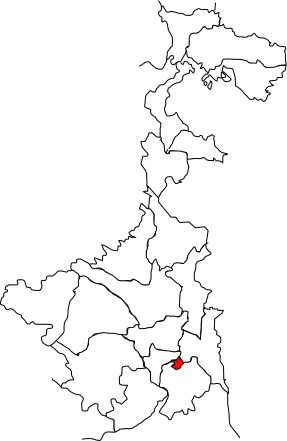
- Map of Kolkata Traffic Police's jurisdiction
- Area: 185 sq km*

Operational structure
- Headquarters: Lalbazar
- Agency executive: Sunil Yadav IPS, Deputy Commissioner
- Traffic Guards: 26

Website
- www.kolkatatrafficpolice.gov.in

Kolkata Traffic Police has the job of managing the flow of traffic in the city of Kolkata, India (formerly Calcutta). It is the traffic police unit within the Kolkata Police.

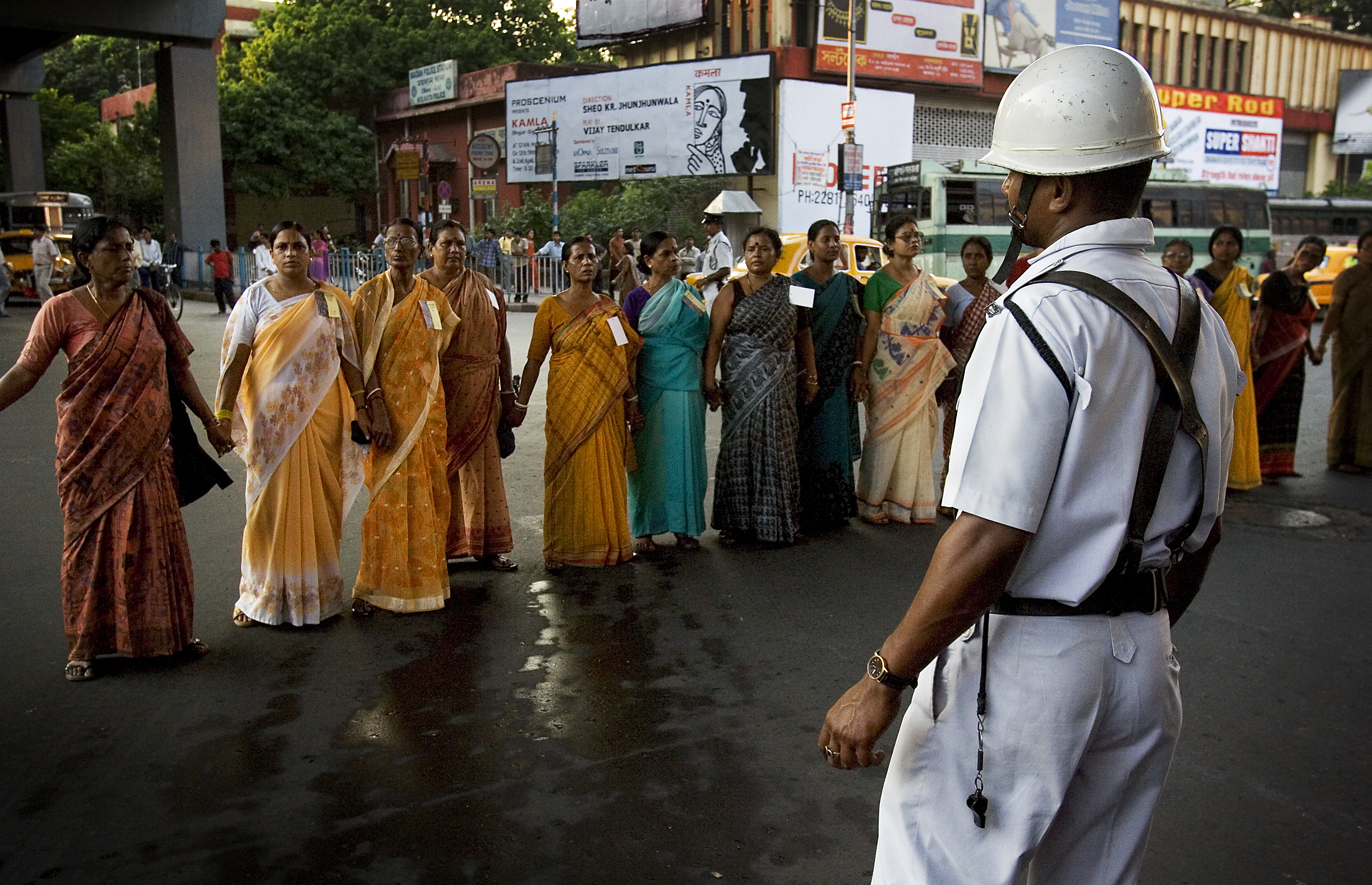
Kolkata police man facing women protesters

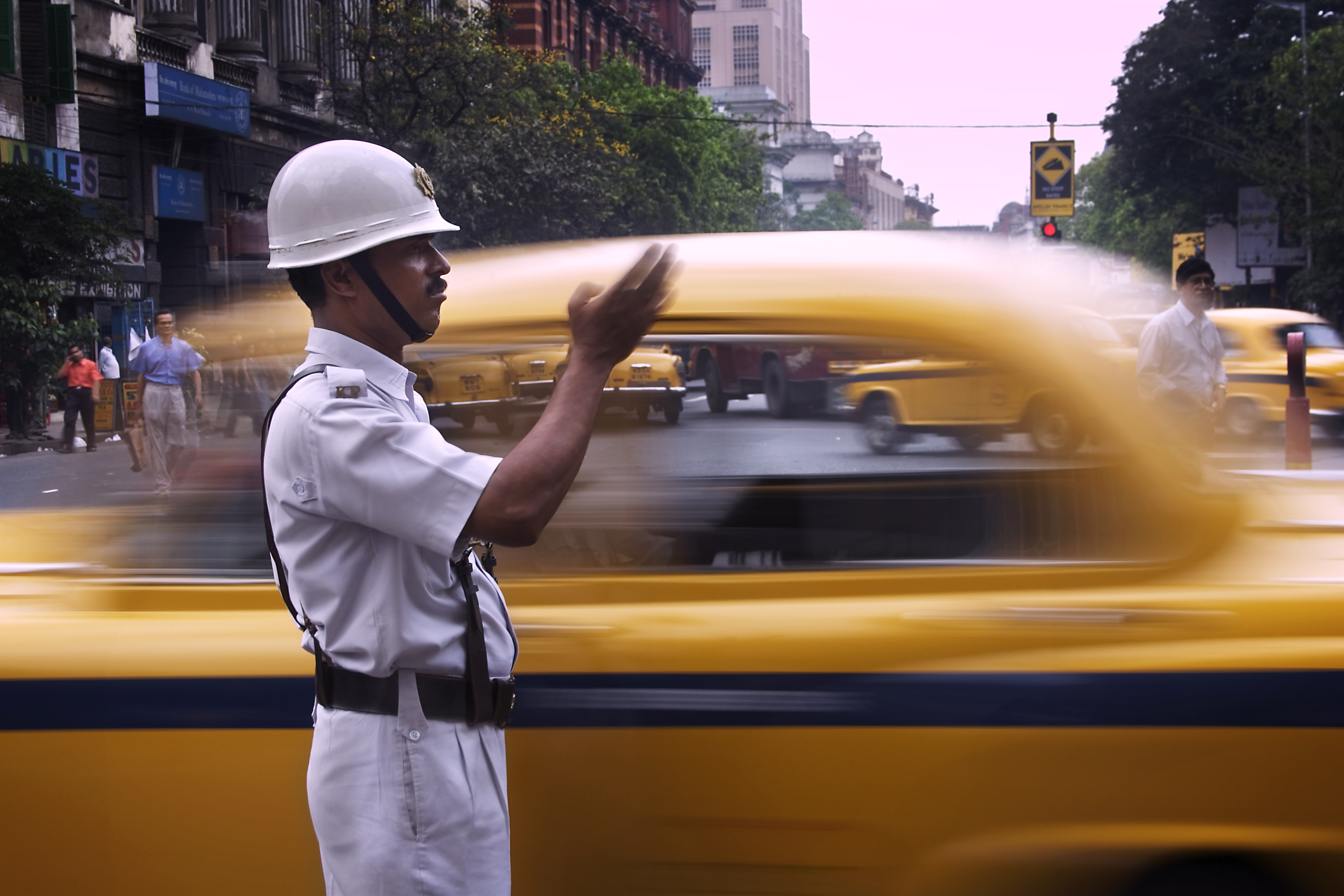
Kolkata Traffic police

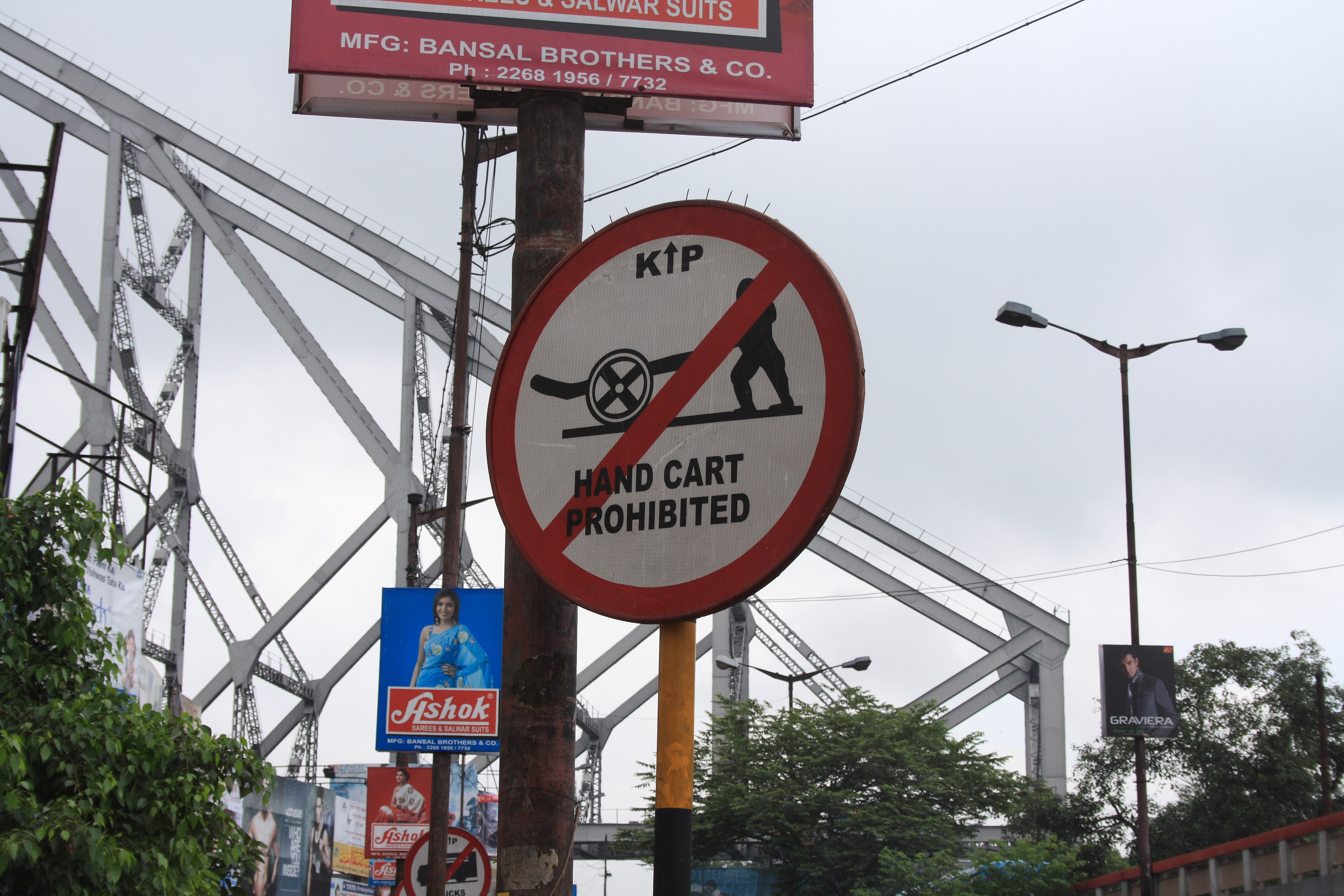
A Kolkata Traffic police Signboard

2 deputy commissioners, 8 assistant commissioners, inspectors, sergeants, assistant sub-inspectors, constables etc. work in this department to help motorists reach their destination safely in minimum time, in a city having roughly 10% roadspace.

== Setup ==
The total city is divided into 25 Traffic Guards. These Traffic Guards implement the policing with regard to traffic in the city. They are:

- Headquarters Traffic Guard
- Howrah Bridge Traffic Guard
- Shyambazar Traffic Guard
- Jorabagan Traffic Guard
- Sealdah Traffic Guard
- South Traffic Guard
- East Traffic Guard
- South East Traffic Guard
- Bhawanipore Traffic Guard
- South West Traffic Guard
- Vidyasagar Setu Traffic Guard
- Ultadanga Traffic Guard
- Beliaghata Traffic Guard
- Tollygunge Traffic Guard
- Park Circus Traffic Guard
- Metiabruz Traffic Guard
- James Long Sarani Traffic Guard
- D H Road Traffic Guard
- Regent Park Traffic Guard
- Jadavpur Traffic Guard
- Garia Traffic Guard
- Kasba Traffic Guard
- Purba Jadavpur Traffic Guard
- Tiljala Traffic Guard
- Taratala Traffic Guard
- Thakurpukur Traffic Guard

The Traffic Control Room functions round the clock to co-ordinate the field work of the fourteen Traffic Guards. The Traffic Control Room is responsible for traffic arrangements for special occasions, as well as, for piloting.

The Fatal Squad of this unit investigates cases of serious street accidents involving deaths. Road safety programmes are also organized by the Traffic Department. The Traffic Training School imparts training to the traffic police personnel regarding traffic control and regulation and traffic signaling.
