= Rizwanur Rahman =

Indian murder victim (1977–2007)

- Rizwanur Rahman
- Born: 1977; Tiljala, Kolkata, West Bengal, India
- Died: 21 September 2007 (aged 30); Patipukur railway station, Kolkata, West Bengal, India
- Occupation: Computer graphics trainer
- Spouse: Priyanka Todi (m. 2007)
- Relatives: Rukbanur Rahman (brother)

Rizwanur Rahman (1977 – 21 September 2007) was a 30-year-old computer graphics trainer who was driven into committing suicide according to the Central Bureau of Investigation.

== Love and marriage ==
Rizwanur Rahman, a middle-class man, met the 23-year-old Priyanka Todi, daughter of Ashok Todi, owner of Lux Cozi, at the graphics training school where he taught. They began an affair, which was kept secret from their families.

It is believed that on 18 August 2007, the two secretly married according to the Special Marriage Act to which a few close friends and colleagues of Rizwanur were witnesses. The two families were not informed about the marriage and no witnesses were declared in the case later on.

After the ceremony, Priyanka went back to the Todi family, and Rizwanur continued his work at the multi-media centre. In late August, Rizwanur Rahman approached his brother and confessed to having secretly married. On 31 August, he brought Priyanka home to his family's small apartment in a working class Muslim neighbourhood. He and Priyanka signed and sent a letter to the police asking for protection from her father.

Later, Priyanka would say: "My mind was a blank... I was just signing whatever letters Rizwan was telling me to sign. I once told him we shouldn’t mention my father, but he said Pappu and Rukbanur had insisted that we frame the letters like that and they knew best."

It is alleged that Priyanka's father, Ashok Todi, and the Todi family were displeased that Priyanka had married into a lower income family, and Rahman, being a Muslim, exacerbated their displeasure. It has also been alleged that Rahman was told to "remove himself" from Priyanka's life and was also threatened by various fronts for this inter-religious marriage. On 31 August, Priyanka and Rahman notified the authorities that they were staying together at Rahman's house.

== Return to parents ==
It has been alleged that due to an understanding with the Todi family, top level police officers of the state summoned the couple several times to State Police Headquarters at Lalbazar, Kolkata, and threatened Rizwan of dire consequences if he did not separate from his wife. Rizwan refused to yield. This is an unsubstantiated allegation levelled against the police force, not against Priyanka's parents, and there is nothing in official records to indicate that any such thing happened. What is on record is a meeting held at the police station on 8 September, eight days after Rahman's marriage was certified. On this occasion, the police summoned Rizwan and strongly urged him to allow his wife to visit her parents for a week or so. They told him that he was liable to be arrested on various charges, including abduction and illegal confinement, if his wife remained confined inside his tiny, rundown house; also that there was a minor charge against him of stealing a cell phone and other items from the Todi mansion, He was told that the girl, Priyanka, had never spoken to her parents properly after disappearing from the house one fine day, and that the parents were totally aghast and bewildered. Rizwan was always present when Priyanka spoke to her parents, and because of his presence, the conversations were necessarily stilted and stifled, with no mutual understanding in sight. Also, Priyanka was speaking only in very brief sentences, monosyllables, yes-no answers and low voice to her parents. It was suspected that she was under pressure from Rizwan; perhaps she was scared of him and his family, perhaps she was unable to speak frankly and clearly to her parents. The police therefore strongly felt that Priyanka should return to her parental house for a week or so, during which time she could speak clearly to her parents and explain what had happened, and also convince them that she was happy.

Rahman continued for a long time to resist the arguments of the police. He finally agreed to let Priyanka visit her parents, but only after he had obtained a signed document stating that she would return to him after a week. One of Priyanka's uncles, who was present at the police headquarters, signed an agreement on plain paper in front of a police witness that Priyanka would be sent back to Rahman's house after 7 days, on 15 September. After all this was done, and on the same day (08 Sept), Priyanka returned to the house of her parents.

== Last days ==
At her father's house, Priyanka Todi spoke to Rahman for the last time on 11 September. On 15 September, Rahman tried calling Priyanka but was refused permission to speak to her by her parents. On 18 September, a witness to their marriage was threatened with arrest by the police for "forcing Priyanka into marriage".

On 19 September, Priyanka, still not sent back, Rahman filed a case with an NGO, documenting police harassment. According to his diary and conversations with close friends, he was also planning further legal moves to get his wife back. In a letter allegedly written by Rahman to an NGO before his death, he stated that he was ready to convert to Hinduism in exchange for a peaceful married life.

Rahman died in the afternoon of 21 September, about 2 weeks after his wife was separated from him. His body was found lying beside a railway line, with hands folded over his chest and a deep wound on the back of his head.

After his death, Priyanka met a state Women's Commission delegation and told them that: "There was no police pressure on me" and that "no police officer ill-treated me". Finally a CBI probe has judged that he had committed suicide and they plan to charge Mr Todi with abetment of suicide.

== Fallout ==
Even before the post-mortem results were released, the then Police Commissioner, Prasun Mukherjee, brushed aside the death of Rahman as a "simple case of suicide". He added that cases of eloping, even by adults, were unacceptable morally. So the police had always intervened in such cases in the past, and would continue to do so in the future. He made the infamous statement, "If the police does not interfere in these (family) matters, who will do it? PWD (Public Works Department)?". When pressed on the legality of his comments (the Supreme Court had previously ruled that a legal inter-religious marriage should be protected by the police), the commissioner became angry and left the conference.

During primary investigations by the media, it was revealed that Mukherjee met the brother of Ashok Todi a few days after Rizwanur got married, and assured him of help from the police force to separate the couple. Mukherjee is also the president of the Cricket Association of Bengal. He won this post without contest due to an active support from the Chief Minister of West Bengal, Mr. Buddhadeb Bhattacharya, and also alleged financial support from Ashok Todi.

The suicide theory has been challenged by reports in the media. A train driver, who was the first person to see Rizwanur Rahman's body beside the tracks, said that Rizwanur was not hit by the train he was driving.

== High Court ruling and transfer of the suspected officers ==
On 16 October 2007, the High Court ruled that the Rizwanur death investigation carried out by the State Government is illegal, and ordered a Central Bureau of Investigations (CBI) enquiry. On 17 October 2007, under intense pressure from the civil society, the Chief Minister of West Bengal, Buddhadeb Bhattacharya stated that all five suspected police officers, including the commissioner, Prasun Mukherjee, and deputy commissioners Gyanwant Singh and Ajay Kumar, who were fully aware that Rizwanur did not commit any crime according to law, but still actively participated in the threatening and torturing due to some understanding with Ashok Todi, will be transferred from their current posts with immediate effect. He also agreed to run a CBI enquiry according to the High Court ruling and said that if the transferred police officers are found guilty by the CBI, they will be punished according to law.

== Bank accounts of Rizwanur's relatives ==
During the investigations, it was alleged that several people including local goons and also some of Rahman's family members received money from Ashok Todi to sabotage the marriage. The CBI has checked the bank transactions of some close relatives of Rahman but the results are unknown. The family members of Rahman have denied taking any money, but said that a blank cheque was offered to them, which they refused to take.

The Telegraph reported that Rizwanur's family friend Syed Mohiuddin, alias Pappu, has admitted to the CBI that financial deal was made to separate Rizwanur Rahman and Priyanka Todi. Pappu, a family friend of the Rahmans, claimed that part of the amount he had taken from Pradip Todi, Priyanka's uncle, had been passed on to Rukbanur Rahman, Rizwanur's elder brother. The transactions involved Rs 500,000 taken on 13 September and Rs 600,000 taken on 19 September.

== Text messages from Rizwanur's mobile ==
A month after his death, while public opinion against the role of police was overwhelming, a series of text messages allegedly sent from Rahman's mobile just before his death were supplied to a few pro-government members of the media from an unknown source. Along with publishing the SMS details, some parts of the media also vigorously started to highlight the arguments of a suicide, and tried to turn the public opinion away from the role of the police force.

In India, it is illegal to record private messages of an individual unless he is suspected of a serious crime. SMS is considered private and Rizwanur did not commit any crime, so it is still unanswered who asked the mobile service provider to do so in Rizwanur's case. There are also questions about the authenticity of these SMSes, which are being published as follows:

To Mr. Ashok Todi: "Papa, there is 10 mins before I kill myself, let me talk to her for the last time", reads one message. (Timestamp: 21 September 9:24AM) To Mrs. Vimala Todi: "Mom, I will kill myself in five minutes, please let me talk to her". (Timestamp: 21 September 9:30AM) Both messages were sent in Hindi. It is claimed by Rahman's brother that Rahman, being a graduate from a Catholic College, used English to send messages.

There are other rumours spread by some sources which said that Rizwanur sent one SMS to one of his friends that read "Please protest aloud after I am gone", and called a former "girlfriend" (Pompi Roy) to express his desire to kill himself, which were later proved to be false. These facts also point to the possibility that Rizwanur was not the person who was sending these messages, if they are at all authentic. The CBI enquiry is still in progress and are expected to submit their first report to the Kolkata High Court within the third week of December.

== Self-claimed kidnap witness ==
On 3 November 2007, a man named Indranil Ghosh claimed on a TV channel that he saw Rahman being kidnapped. His statements tallied with an anonymous letter previously sent to CBI in which it was claimed that Rahman was kidnapped the day he died. After interrogation, the CBI found some inconsistencies in his story and concluded that there was no concrete evidence that suggested such a kidnap took place.

== Priyanka's legal communique to her in-laws ==
Priyanka Todi has sent a letter to her mother-in-law stating on 6 November, that:

"Priyanka Todi will not return to the house of Rizwanur Rehman. She will stay with her father Ashok Todi at his residence. She is equally shocked after the incident as is Rizwanur’s family. Please return her belongings... including saris, greeting cards, personal diaries, photographs, birth certificates, school certificates and others."

The letter was delivered through a solicitor and was addressed to Rizwanur's mother Kishwar Jehan.

Priyanka had asked her in-laws to explain how a private vernacular news channel could get hold of her photographs without her permission.

Rahman's mother has termed Priyanka Todi's letter as "rubbing salt on her wounds". She said she was "deeply hurt" after reading the letter. She also said that she had expected her to attend the last rites of her son. She wrote back a reply which said: “You should have come to meet a mother who lost her son because of the conspiracy hatched by influential police officers and your father. It is a matter of deep regret that you have sent the letter through your advocate...”

Agreeing to return Priyanka’s personal articles, Kishwar said: “I am hoping that you will come yourself and take these things. It will be very unfortunate if I have to hand them over to an advocate’s peon or clerk instead of my daughter-in-law with whom I have no judicial dispute.”

== Politicians' statements and rioting ==
The prominent Communist Party of India (Marxist) Politburo member Brinda Karat has stated that

"Police officers here were transferred over the death of Rizwanur Rahman in keeping with the "progressive culture" that existed in West Bengal... We are with Rizwanur Rahman's family and want justice and action against those found guilty [of involvement in the death of the computer graphics teacher]"

In a statement dated 15 October, State Secretary of the Communist Party of India (Maoist), Mr Soumen has stated:

"Rizwanur was murdered as he had dared to fall in love and later marry a Hindu girl... The chief minister is not able to shield the guilty officers of Kolkata Police because of the public outrage against administrative high-handedness."

Front partner Communist Party of India (CPI) has issued a state secretariat resolution stating:

"The youth was said to be well educated, decent and belonged to a cultured family. His unnatural death has shaken a large number of people. The public outrage following his death should not be undermined. The intervention of the Kolkata police in a marriage between two adults was not a healthy signal."

Kshiti Goswami of the Revolutionary Socialist Party demanded a judicial inquiry into the matter. Forward Bloc Secretary Ashok Ghosh described the incident as "shocking and shameful". He said an inquiry commission should be instituted immediately so that the Kolkata police cannot influence investigations into Rehman's death.

All India Trinamool Congress chairperson Mamata Banerjee visited the Rizvanur's family and held the city police directly responsible for the death. It organised a public rally in the city where Ms Banerjee and Rizwanur's relatives accused the CPI(M) leadership of "offering money" to them to hush up the case. Mamata Banerjee has said:

It has been 23 days since Rizwanur died. Today is the holy day of Id and we have been out greeting people on the occasion of Id. But in this neighbourhood no one is celebrating Id for obvious reasons. There have been no arrests and no progress in the case, "the foolish arrogant chief minister is thinking whether it is the right protocol for him to go and see the mother of the murdered son."

Indian singer and ex-MP Kabir Suman also sang a protest song showing his sympathy for the Hindu-Muslim couple named "Rizwanur Brityo" in the year 2008.

== Violence and rioting by disaffected Muslims ==
On 22 September 2007, a violent Muslim mob went on rampage in the Park Circus and Tiljala area of Kolkata – Beniapukur, Topsia, Tangra and Kkaraya Police Station Areas – and set a police vehicle on fire when a rumour spread that Rehman's body had disappeared from the police morgue. More than a dozen policemen were injured in brickbatting and stone-pelting. They again set a police vehicle on fire around noon. The area became a battlefield as the angry mob first blocked a road and then burned out 8 private buses. Some young Muslims were seen brandishing swords and shotguns. A few shots were fired at the mob by the police. The enraged mob, numbering around 300, then attacked policemen with bricks and yet another 4x4 jeep was set on fire. Heavily outnumbered and facing unprecedented ferocity from angry Muslim youths brandishing swords, machetes and shotguns, Police was forced to beat a retreat. It was only after Eastern Frontier Rifles was deployed that the riot was quelled. 17 policemen were injured, while 24 Muslim youths were injured. 12 vehicles had been completely damaged – including three police vehicles, including a special 4x4 jeep.

== Ruling front's fear of alienation of the Muslim voters ==
Muslims form a large fraction the voters in West Bengal. Members of the ruling front acknowledge that the police claim of Rizwanur Rahman committing suicide is alienating Muslim voters. M. J. Akbar writes:

"The fate of Rizwan ur Rehman, the young man whose death in suspicious circumstances has set off a firestorm in Bengal. The Muslim vote, my Calcuttan friend said bitterly, had become like an item number in Hindi films. It was used to pump up the box office, and then dumped completely from the script."

"Left bulwark in Bengal has been the substantial Muslim vote: Muslims account for 27% of the population and over 30% of the vote since they tend to vote in larger numbers. This support has weakened in rural areas because of Nandigram, and in Kolkata because of the case of a young man called Rizwan ur Rehman."

Veteran Bengali politician Jyoti Basu has said:

"Yes, the state government's image has received a beating due to the delay in transferring the policemen who had allegedly coerced Rizwanur. We have suffered politically".

== Final verdict ==
According to the CBI probe, the cause of death of Rizwanur was suicide. However the CBI charged Priyanka's father Ashok Todi, her uncle Pradip Todi, maternal uncle Anil Saraogi, three police officers—former deputy commissioner Ajoy Kumar, ACP Sukanti Chakraborty, sub-inspector Krishnendu Das, and Mohiuddin alias Pappu, who acted as a link between cops and the Todis, with abetment to suicide of Rahman. The CBI framed charge sheet against them for non-bailable criminal proceedings. The CBI also recommended departmental proceedings against former Kolkata Police commissioner Prasun Mukherjee and administrative proceedings against former DC Gyanwant Singh for interfering in the marriage of two consenting adults.

On 13 October 2008, the Supreme Court of India stopped all proceedings in the Rizwanur Rahman case till the Calcutta High Court decided Ashok Todi's petition challenging CBI's charge sheet against him.

== Murder of investigating officer ==
On 11 February 2009, Arindam Manna, the Government Railway Police officer who started the probe into the death of Rizwanur, was found murdered beside a railway track, a considerable distance away from his work place.

Manna was also on the list of witness that the CBI submitted along with its charge sheet to the Chief Metropolitan Magistrate.

The body has injuries on the left eye, right leg and a deep cut on the throat.

The family members of Manna claimed that there was enough evidence to prove that Manna had been murdered.

"Arindam had two mobile phones – one had Vodafone and the other had Airtel connection. The police recovered the cell phones, but the SIM cards are missing," Manna's brother Debaprasad Moitra claimed.

"The SIM cards have been deliberately taken out to destroy the evidence. Arindam's hands and legs have been broken and his eyes were jutting out. This cannot happen in a suicide. It is a murder and we want the criminals to be punished," Moitra said.

== See also ==
- List of unsolved murders (2000–present)
- Nitish Katara
- Prasun Mukherjee
