= Commissioner of the Kolkata Police =

Chief of Police, Kolkata

Commissioner of Kolkata Police Force
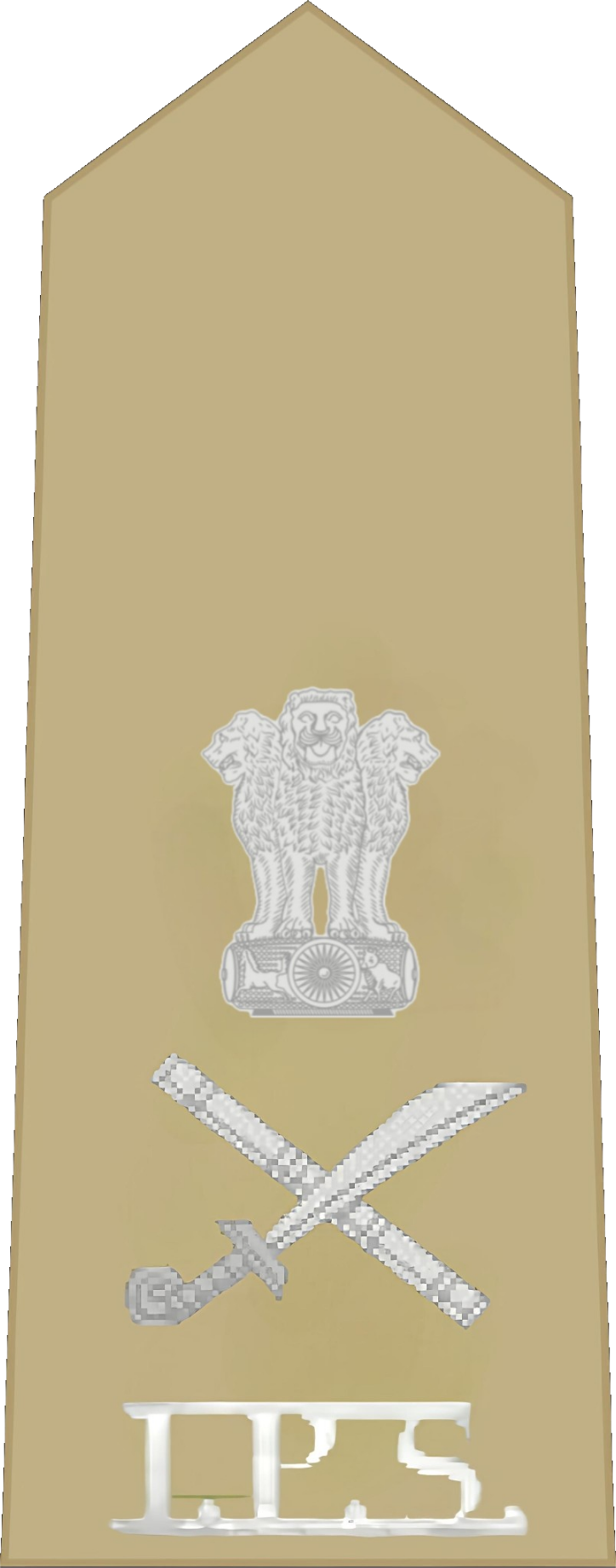
- Insignia of Commissioner of Police
- Incumbent; Ajay Kumar‌ Nand, IPS since 17 March 2026
- Kolkata Police Force
- Style: The Learned Commissioner of Police
- Abbreviation: Ld. CP
- Reports to: Minister of Home and Hill Affairs, Government of West Bengal; Additional Chief Secretary (Home and Hill Affairs), Govt. of West Bengal
- Residence: 2, Loudon Street, Kolkata
- Seat: Lalbazar, Kolkata
- Appointer: Government of West Bengal
- Constituting instrument: The Calcutta Police Act, 1866
- Formation: 1856; 170 years ago
- First holder: S. Wauchope
- Salary: HAG scale (Level 15)
- Website: kolkatapolice.gov.in

The Commissioner of the Kolkata Police (formerly Commissioner of the Calcutta Police) is the head of the Kolkata Police. The Kolkata police commissioner is appointed by the Minister of Home and Hill Affairs and reports independently to the Home Secretary for West Bengal. The commissioner sits at the Kolkata Police Headquarters, located at 18 Lalbazar Street in the Lalbazar neighbourhood of central Kolkata.

The commissioner is an Indian Police Service officer of the rank of Additional Director-General (ADG) of Police. The commissioner heads the almost 35,000 strong metropolitan police force in a jurisdiction consisting of approximately 243km^{2} area and is the home to 14,617,992 people (2011 census figures).

== List of commissioners of police, Kolkata ==
Sl.No	Name	Terms of office	Badge name
1	S. Wauchope	1856–1863	
2	V. H. Shalch	1863–1866	
3	Stuart Saunders Hogg	1866–1876	
4	C. T. Metcalfe	1876–1881	
5	Henry Harrison	1881–1889	
6	Sir John Lambert	1889–1897	
7	A. H. James	1897–1901	
8	E. M. Showera	1901–1902	
9	R. D. O. Bignell	1902–1905	
10	Sir Frederick Loch Halliday	1905–1916	
11	Sir Reginald Clarke	1916–1923	
12	Sir Charles Tegart	1923–1931	
13	L. H. Colson	1931–1939	
14	Sir C. E. S. Fairweather	1939–1943	
15	R. E. A. Ray	1943–1946	
16	D. R. Hardwick	1946–1947	
17	Surendra Nath Chatterjee	1947–1951	S. N. CHATTERJEE (Note: He was the first Indian origin Police Commissioner)
18	H. S. Ghosh Chaudhuri	1951–1960	
19	U. Mukherjee	1960–1962	
20	S. M. Ghosh	1962–1964	
21	P. K. Sen	1964–1967	
22	Ranjit Kumar Gupta	1970–1971	
23	R. N. Chatterjee	1971–1972	
24	S. C. Chaudhuri	1972–1976	
25	S. Basu	1976–1978	
26	S. K. Sinha	1978–1980	
27	N. Som	1980–1984	
28	B. K. Basu	1984–1988	
29	B. K. Saha	1988–1992	
30	T. K. Talukdar	1992–1996	
31	Dinesh Chandra Vajpai	1996–2001	
32	S. K. Chakroborty	2001–2004	
33	Prasun Mukherjee	17 October 2004 – 16 October 2007	PRASUN MUKHERJEE
34	Gautam Mohan Chakraborty	17 October 2007 – 16 March 2011	GAUTAM
35	Ranjit Kumar Pachnanda	17 March 2011 – 14 February 2013	R. K. PACHNANDA
36	Surajit Kar Purkayastha	14 February 2013 – 13 February 2016	SURAJIT
37	Rajeev Kumar	14 February 2016 – 12 April 2016	RAJEEV
38	Soumen Mitra	13 April 2016 – 21 May 2016	SOUMEN MITRA
(37)	Rajeev Kumar	21 May 2016 – 19 February 2019	RAJEEV
39	Anuj Sharma	19 February 2019 – 5 April 2019	ANUJ
40	Dr. Rajesh Kumar	6 April 2019 – 26 May 2019	DR. RAJESH
(39)	Anuj Sharma	26 May 2019 – 6 February 2021	ANUJ
(38)	Soumen Mitra	6 February 2021 – 31 December 2021	SOUMEN MITRA
41	Vineet Kumar Goyal	1 January 2022 – 17 September 2024	VINEET KUMAR GOYAL
42	Manoj Kumar Verma	17 September 2024 – 30 January 2026	M. K. VERMA
43	Supratim Sarkar	31 January 2026 – 16 March 2026	SUPRATIM
44	Ajay Kumar Nand	17 March 2026 – Incumbent	AJAY KUMAR NAND

== See also ==
- Bidhannagar Police Commissionerate
- Police Commissioner of Bangalore
- Police Commissioner of Delhi
- Police Commissioner of Mumbai
- Commissioner of Police, Hyderabad City
