= Soumen Mitra =

Indian police officer (born 1961)

38th Commissioner of the Kolkata Police
- In office 8 February 2021 – 31 December 2021
- Preceded by: Anuj Sharma
- Succeeded by: Vineet Kumar Goyal
- In office 13 April 2016 – 21 May 2016
- Preceded by: Rajeev Kumar
- Succeeded by: Rajeev Kumar

Personal details
- Born: 1961 (age 64–65)
- Education: B.A.; M.A.; M.Phil.
- Alma mater: Jawaharlal Nehru University, New Delhi; Presidency College, Kolkata; St. Xavier's Collegiate School, Kolkata
- Police career
- Service: Indian Police Service
- Department: West Bengal Police Kolkata Police
- Service years: 1988–2021
- Status: Retired
- Badge no.: 19881066
- Awards: President's Police Medal (for Distinguished Service); Police Medal for Meritorious Service; 50th Anniversary Independence Medal

Soumen Mitra is an Indian police officer who served as the 38th Commissioner of the Kolkata Police. Mitra started his police career as a probation officer in Darjeeling as part of the 1988 batch of police officers in the Indian Police Service.

Mitra served as Commissioner of the Kolkata Police twice, first appointed by the Election Commission of India in 2016 during the West Bengal Legislative Assembly elections and again in 2021. He was reappointed in 2021 by the West Bengal Government during that year's legislative assembly elections.

== Early life and career ==
Born in 1961, Mitra was educated at St. Xavier's Collegiate School, Kolkata, Presidency College, Kolkata and Jawaharlal Nehru University, New Delhi, completing his Bachelor of Arts, Master of Arts and Master of Philosophy. A history graduate, he qualified for the Civil Services examinations and was inducted into the Indian Police Service, belonging to the 1988-batch in the West Bengal cadre. Initially, he started out as a probation officer in Darjeeling before being appointed the assistant commissioner of police operations in Darjeeling. He subsequently held other roles, acting as a police superintendent under the West Bengal Police in Barrackpore, Howrah and Murshidabad. During this time, he started development and welfare projects in areas where he was posted. He is credited with starting the Chandradeep Mela, an annual social event in Hariharpara, an area that was known for having a high rate of communal violence. The introduction of the social event helped stabilize the political atmosphere in the area.

Mitra was transferred to the Kolkata Police to serve as a deputy commissioner for the detective department. He helped lead the police team in investigating the attack on the American Culture Centre in Kolkata in 2002 and helped investigate the Kolkata Stock Exchange scam perpetrated in 2001. Later, he was appointed as the additional director general in charge of the Criminal Investigation Department of the West Bengal Police.

=== Police Commissioner (2016) ===
In the run up to the 2016 Assembly Elections in West Bengal, Mitra was appointed the Commissioner of the Kolkata Police by the Election Commission of India without consulting the incumbent Trinamool Congress government on 13 April 2016. Mitra's predecessor, Rajeev Kumar was seen as biased towards the ruling party, and the other parties contesting the elections had filed petitions to the Election Commission alleging mismanagement of the elections due to rampant incidents of poll violence targeted at members of those parties. Mitra, who was perceived to be a rival of Kumar, cracked down on poll violence and was credited with ensuring a smooth election. Subsequently, after the Trinamool government came back to power with a landslide victory, Soumen Mitra was removed from his post as Police Commissioner and was appointed as the Additional Director General of Police, Training Branch.

=== Police Commissioner (2021) ===
In February 2021, Mitra was again appointed as the Police Commissioner of the Kolkata Police in the period prior to the 2021 Assembly Elections in West Bengal by Mamata Banerjee on the recommendation of the Election Commission. In August 2021, Mitra received the Police Medal for outstanding service to the West Bengal government. Mitra continued being the police commissioner after the conclusion of the elections until he retired from the Indian Police Service in December 2021.

== Other interests ==
Mitra has an interest in heritage structures. In 2004, Mitra helped rescue and restore a run-down building on Ripon Street. The building had once been occupied by a monk who sought to claim the identity of a wealthy landlord through a series of legal battles, which were dubbed the Bhawal case. In 2015, he helped restore the Police Training School which previously served as one of India's first mental asylums, built in a unique architecture style that was pioneered by Jeremy Bentham in the 18th century.

== Literary works ==
Mitra's M Phil dissertation has been published as a book entitled In Search of an Identity: The History of Football in Colonial Calcutta, 1880–1950.

In 2019 he collaborated with his wife, Monabi Mitra, in writing Under The Banyan Tree: The Forgotten Story of Barrackpore Park, narrating the two hundred year-old history of Government House Barrackpore.

== Personal life ==
Soumen Mitra is married and resides in Kolkata. His wife, Monabi Mitra, is a professor of English at Scottish Church College, Kolkata and a crime novelist.
