= Anuj Sharma (police officer) =

Indian Police Service officer

Anuj Sharma PMMS PPM IPS
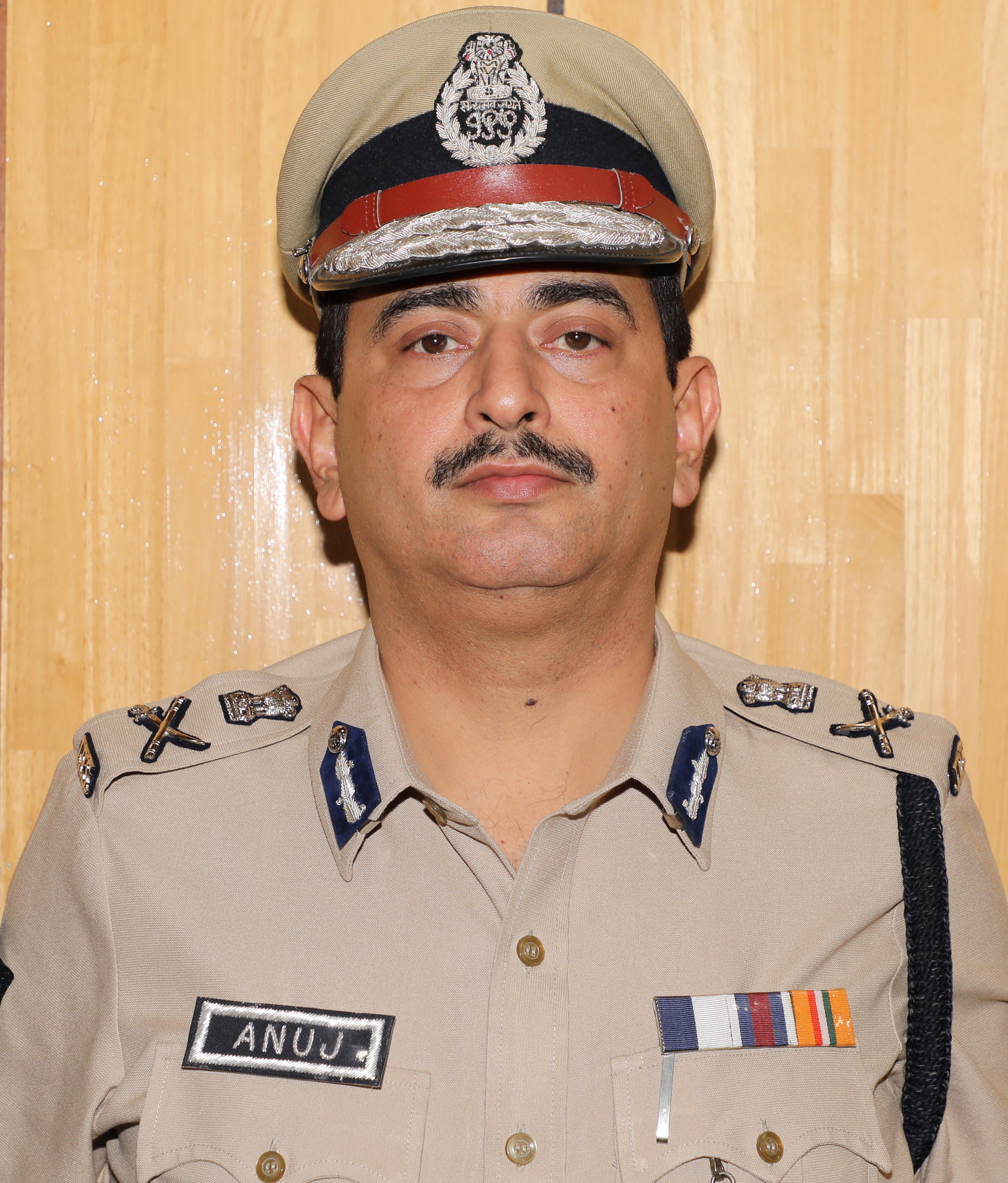
- Sharma in 2019

40th Police Commissioner of Kolkata
- In office 26 May 2019 – 7 February 2021
- Preceded by: Rajesh Kumar, IPS
- Succeeded by: Soumen Mitra, IPS
- In office 19 February 2019 – 5 April 2019
- Preceded by: Rajiv Kumar, IPS
- Succeeded by: Rajesh Kumar, IPS
- Born: 27 March 1968 (age 58); Uttar Pradesh, India
- Education: B.A., M.A.
- Alma mater: Lucknow University
- Police career
- Service: Indian Police Service
- Department: Kolkata Police; West Bengal Police
- Service years: 1991–Present
- Status: Serving
- Rank: Director General of Police
- Badge no.: 19911023
- Awards: President's Police Medal (for Distinguished Service) (2016); Police Medal for Meritorious Service (2007); 50th Anniversary Independence Medal (1997); 75th Independence Anniversary Medal

Anuj Sharma (born 27 March 1968) is an officer of the Indian Police Service. He was the 40th Kolkata Police Commissioner, having served from 19 February to 5 April 2019 and from 26 May 2019 to 7 February 2021. On 26 May 2019, Anuj Sharma was reinstated again as the Kolkata Police Commissioner replacing Dr. Rajesh Kumar.

== Education ==
Anuj Sharma completed school education at La Martinière College, Lucknow in 1985. Sharma completed his BA and MA in Economics at Lucknow University in 1987 and 1989 respectively.

== Career ==
Sharma qualified for the 1991 batch of the Indian Police Service. He was part of the 44th regular recruit training group at Sardar Vallabhbhai Patel National Police Academy.

He served as a Probationary Officer from 1991 to 1992, Deputy Inspector General (DIG) of Police, Burdwan range from 1 June 2006 to 1 July 2008, DIG HQrs from 2 July 2008 to 5 August 2009, and DIG and Criminal Investigation Department (CID) of West Bengal from 6 August 2009 to 20 July 2011.

Sharma served as the Inspector General of Police (IGP) Coastal Security West Bengal from 21 July 2011 to 18 June 2012. He served as the IGP of the North Bengal region 19 June 2012 to 19 March 2013, and handled the Gorkha unrest in Darjeeling. He was then the IGP of Law and Order from May 2013 to Jan 2016. In 2016, he received promotion to the rank of Additional Director General (ADG) & Inspector General of Police and served as ADG, Law & Order from January 2016 to February 2019.

He was removed as the Commissioner of Police by the Election Commission of India on 5 April 2019, and was replaced by Rajesh Kumar. However, on 26 May 2019, Sharma was reinstated back as the Commissioner of Police. At present he is DGP Armed Police, West Bengal.

== Awards ==
In 2007, Sharma received the Police Medal for Meritorious Service (PMMS). In 2016, Sharma was awarded the President's Police Medal for Distinguished Service (PPMDS).

== See also ==
- Kolkata Police
- Surajit Kar Purkayastha
- Soumen Mitra
