= Surajit Kar Purkayastha =

State Security Advisor of West Bengal and former Indian police officer

Surajit Kar Purkayastha IPS
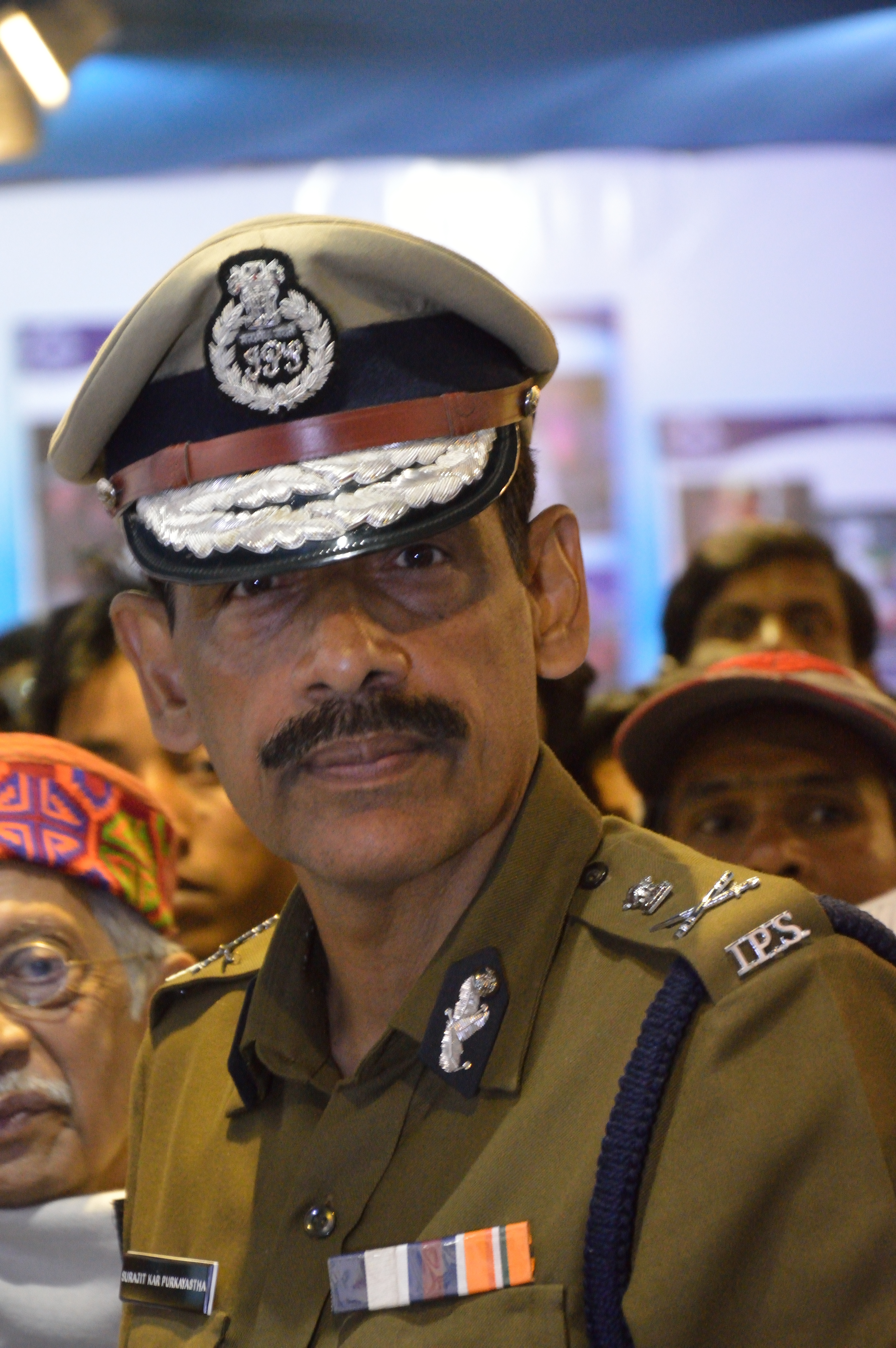
- Purkayastha as Police commissioner of Kolkata in 38th International Kolkata Book Fair at Milan Mela Complex in 2014
- Born: 1 January 1957 (age 69); West Bengal, India
- Citizenship: India
- Education: Mechanical Engineering and PGDIT
- Alma mater: IIT Kharagpur, IIFT New Delhi
- Spouse: Sharmistha
- Police career
- Country: India
- Allegiance: Indian Police Service
- Department: West Bengal Police; Kolkata Police
- Service years: 1985–2018
- Status: Retired
- Rank: Director General of Police
- Badge no.: 19851025
- Awards: President's Police Medal (for Distinguished Service); Police Medal for Meritorious Service and Chief Minister's Police Medal for outstanding service 50th Anniversary Independence Medal

West Bengal State Security Advisor
- In office 1 June 2018 – 31 May 2021
- Chief Minister: Mamata Banerjee
- Preceded by: Position established
- Succeeded by: Manoj Malaviya (2023) (as State Police Advisor)

Director General of Police of West Bengal
- In office 30 May 2016 – 31 May 2018
- Preceded by: G. M. P. Reddy
- Succeeded by: Virendra

36th Police Commissioner of Kolkata
- In office 14 February 2013 – 13 February 2016
- Preceded by: Ranjit Kumar Pachnanda
- Succeeded by: Rajeev Kumar

Surajit Kar Purkayastha (Bengali: সুরজিৎ কর পুরকায়স্থ; born 1 January 1957) is a retired senior Indian Police Service officer of 1985 West Bengal cadre who served as the State Security Advisor of West Bengal from 1 June 2018 to 31 May 2021. Prior to that, he served as Director General of Police of West Bengal and was the 36th Police Commissioner of Kolkata.

== Education ==
Purkayastha holds a Mechanical engineering degree from Indian Institute of Technology, Kharagpur also completed PGDIT from Indian Institute of Foreign Trade, New Delhi and after completion of his studies he joined Calcutta Electric Supply Corporation.

== Police career ==
Purkayastha is an officer of 1985 West Bengal cadre, who completed his Indian Police Service training in Burdwan district. His first posting was at Bolpur subdivision as SDPO in Birbhum district. He has also worked as Additional Superintendent of Police in South 24 Parganas district and also as Addl. SP, Asansol and Addl SP, Barrackpore. He later worked in Kolkata Police in various posts like DC Security Control, DCDD, DC Traffic, etc. After that he became the Superintendent of Police of Howrah and then went to Iran as a Research and Analysis Wing (R&AW) officer and stayed there for 5 years. He also held the ranks of DIG-Vigilance, DIG PR, IG-South Bengal, IG-Law and Order. Then he became ADG- Law and Order before assuming the office of Police Commissioner of Kolkata.

== As Police Commissioner of Kolkata ==
On 13 February 2013, Purkayastha was appointed as the 36th Police Commissioner of Kolkata replacing Ranjit Kumar Panchananda. He served as the Commissioner for three years and was succeeded by Rajeev Kumar.

== As the Director General of Police ==
After serving as Police Commissioner of Kolkata for three years, Purkayastha was appointed as the DGP of the state succeeding G. M. P. Reddy and served as the State Police chief for two years until 31 May 2018 when he was succeeded by Virendra.

== As the State Security Advisor ==
After his retirement, the state government created a post for Purkayastha -- State Security Advisor, on the lines of the National Security Advisor (NSA).

== See also ==
- IPS
- Police
- Soumen Mitra
