= Mukundgarh =

- city
- Location in Rajasthan, India Mukundgarh (India)
- Coordinates: 27.95°N 75.2167°E
- Country: India
- State: Rajasthan
- District: Jhunjhunu
- Elevation: 349 m (1,145 ft)

Population (2011)
  - Total: 18,469

Languages
  - Official: Hindi
- Time zone: UTC+5:30 (IST)
- PIN: 333 705
- Telephone code: +91-1594 / 01594
- Vehicle registration: RJ-18

Mukundgarh is a small city. Mukundgarh is a municipality and Subdistrict in Nawalgarh Tahasil Jhunjhunu district in the Indian state of Rajasthan. It is part of the Shekhawati region. It lies a few kilometres from Nawalgarh.

Mukundgarh town was established by Thakur Mukund Singh Saheb in the 18th century. Mukundgarh was renamed from Shahabsar.

The main attractions include the Mukundgarh Fort, Ganeriwal Haveli, Kanodia Haveli and Saraf Haveli. These are old fresco-rich mansions that are still well-preserved. A few temples worth visiting are the Natwar Naresh Ji Temple, Shiv Ji Temple, and Gopinath Ji Temple built by the Shekhawat Thakurs.

The town has a vibrant and colorful culture, with various festivals and celebrations held throughout the year. Mukundgarh hosts the annual Gangaur festival, a traditional Rajasthani event dedicated to the Goddess Parvati, Ganesh Mahotsav and Ashwin Navratri.

There is a temple in Shri Bawliya Baba mandir, in Mukundgarh, where a wick is burning inside. It can only be seen from the left side. However, if you enter inside the Garbhgrah(Sanctum Sanctorum) of the temple, then the burning wick will not be visible.

Ganesh Mahotsav is celebrated in the town on a large level for 10 days from Ganesh Chaturthi by:

1. Swami Vivekanand Seva Sangh, near municipality building or lal kua
2. Shri Nav Ganesh Mahotsav, behind the Mukundgarh Fort

During Ashwin Navratri(as per Hindu calendar), the people of the town establishes Goddess Durga statues for 9 days.

Some famous education points in the town are as follows:

1. Seth Shree Sagarmal Bagrodia Schools and ITI
2. Kanoria Schools and Colleges
3. Gurukripa Education Point
4. Ramkumari Group of Educations
5. Kesri Devi Gyan Mandir
6. Gigi Devi Chokhani Bal Mandir
7. Mukundgarh Public School
8. Kids World Public School
9. All Govt Schools

== Geography ==
Mukundgarh is located at 27.95°N 75.2167°E. It has an average elevation of 349 metres (1148 feet).

== Demographics ==
The Mukundgarh Municipality has population of 18,469 of which 9,314 are males while 9,155 are females as per report released by Census of India, 2011. The population of children aged 0-6 is 2732 which is 14.79% of total population of Mukundgarh. the female sex ratio is 983 against state average of 928. Moreover the child sex ratio in Mukundgarh is around 852 compared to Rajasthan state average of 888. The literacy rate of Mukundgarh city is 73.28% higher than the state average of 66.11%. In Mukundgarh, male literacy is around 85.60% while the female literacy rate is 61.05%.

== See also ==
- Shekhawati
- Thikanas of Shekhawati
- Shyam Sunder Surolia
