= Prasun Mukherjee =

Former police commissioner, India

33rd Police Commissioner of Kolkata
- In office 30 November 2004 – 16 October 2007
- Preceded by: S. K. Chakroborty
- Succeeded by: Goutam Mohan Chakraborty

15th President of the Cricket Association of Bengal
- In office 27 September 2006 – 29 July 2008
- Preceded by: Jagmohan Dalmiya
- Succeeded by: Jagmohan Dalmiya

Prasun Mukherjee (born 1950) the former Commissioner of Police in the city of Kolkata (Kolkata Police), West Bengal, India and a senior Indian Police Service (IPS) officer. In 2006 he was elected President of the Cricket Association of Bengal but lost the next election and was replaced by Jagmohan Dalmiya in 2008.

== Early life ==
Born in 1950, he earned a degree in mathematics from Patna University and qualified for the Civil Services and was allotted the Indian Police Service (IPS) in 1973, with West Bengal Cadre. During his career so far in the IPS, he has held the following posts:

- As Supernumerary ASP while under field training in Jalpaigiri
- ASP & Sub Divisional Police Officer (SDPO), Arambagh
- Additional Superintendent of Police (Addl SP), Birbhum
- Deputy Commissioner of Police (DCP), Detective Department (II), Calcutta Police
- DCP, 1st Battalion, Calcutta Armed Police
- DCP, North Division, Calcutta Police
- SP, Howrah
- Special Superintendent (SS) of Police, Criminal Investigative Department (C.I.D.), West Bengal
- DCP, Detective Department (I), Calcutta Police
- Deputy Inspector General (D.I.G.), C.I.D.( Operations), West Bengal
- D.I.G., C.I.D., West Bengal
- D.I.G.( Headquarters), West Bengal
- Inspector-General of Police (Law & Order), West Bengal
- IGP, South Bengal Zone, Kolkata
- IGP, Enforcement Branch, West Bengal
- Additional Commissioner of Police, Kolkata Police
- Additional Director General & IG of Police, Railways, West Bengal
- Police Commissioner of Kolkata
- Additional Director General & IG of Police (Telecom), West Bengal
- Director General, Bureau of Police Research & Development, Ministry of Home Affairs, Govt. of India

He took over as the Commissioner of Police on 30 November 2004, and on 17 October 2007, was transferred as Additional Director General of Police, Telecom, West Bengal. Previously, he has also held the post of the 'Secretary of the IPS Officers' Association of West Bengal for eight years in two stints.

== The Rizwanur Rahman Case ==
His name hit the headlines while he attempted to endorse the reason for the mysterious death of Rizwanur Rahman, a graphic design instructor at a multimedia teaching private institute. Rahman was allegedly harassed by the top Kolkata Police officials just before his death on 21 September 2007. Mukherjee certified his death as "definitely a suicide or an accident", even before a post-mortem examination report was available. Rahman was a 30-year-old Muslim male from a lower-middle-class background, who married a 23-year-old wealthy Hindu woman under provisions of the Special Marriage Act, 1955; the civil law applicable for registered marriage of persons from two different communities. The woman's father, who was previously under scrutiny for illegal cricket betting, reportedly sought help from Mukherjee through Snehashish Ganguly, elder brother of Sourav Ganguly, a renowned cricketer in his own right. Snehashish is one of the Directors of the firm owned by the woman's family. It is said the request was for getting his daughter back under the custody of father although she was of appropriate age to marry as an adult and legally allowed to live with her husband. The interference between the two consenting adults took place from 31 August till the death of Rahman on 21 September 2007. On 8 September, Rahman was physically separated from his wife with pressure from top police officials. After a fortnight of the separation, while Rahman filed a case with an NGO, and was planning to move to court, his severed body was found next to the railway tracks.

Mukherjee attended a press conference on 23 September to endorse the supposed duty of police officials to interfere in people's personal matters. He remarked that "police can interfere in cases where a marriage has taken place between families who are poles apart in social standing". He claimed to have done such things in the past, and said he would do so in the future too. He also asked the press, "who else will do it? The Public Works Department?"

He walked out of the said conference when asked whether he is aware of several laws regarding freedom of adult couples and protection of inter-religious marriages. Later, some police officials confessed that during the harassment, they were aware that Rahman was innocent of any crime, but were just carrying out orders from "the top".

The case generated huge media outcry, and in 2011, has even been linked to the electoral defeat of the ruling government, hither-to considered invincible.

== Transfer from the post of Police Commissioner ==
As of early October 2007, several eminent social workers and intellectuals demanded Mukherjee's removal from the post of The Commissioner of Police. The government delayed to take any action presumably due to his close personal relations with the former Chief Minister Buddhadeb Bhattacharjee, who previously assisted him in attaining the post of the President of the Cricket Association of Bengal. Buddhadeb Bhattacharya was also the Minister of Police, and has a long history of praising the police force for all their actions.

After a lot of speculations, Mukherjee was merely transferred from his post of the Commissioner of Police, on 17 October 2007, primarily due to media and public pressure. The Chief Minister announced that the action of transfer is a punishment in reality, and blamed the delay in his decision on a court case which was going on in the Kolkata High Court. He also added that suspension or removal of an IPS officer cannot be done until the results of the investigation into the case by the Central Bureau of Investigation (CBI) are submitted to the High Court of Calcutta.

== Interests ==
Mukherjee has expressed interest in wildlife and nature conservation, and was one of the founder members of the NGO Nature Environment & Wildlife Society (NEWS), Calcutta in 1992. He has been the President of NEWS since 1996 and the organization has grown to become one of the leading NGO's working in this field. Mukherjee is also the Editor-in-Chief of the NEWS's quarterly colour magazine 'ENVIRON', focusing on conservation of wildlife & nature.

Mukherjee has been the President of the West Bengal Athletic Association for the past three years, during which time he encouraged the involvement of sports-persons and corporate sector personalities in supporting the activities of athletes.

Police appointments
Preceded by S. K. Chakravarti	Commissioner of Police, Kolkata; 2004-17 Oct 2007;	Succeeded by Gautam Mohan Chakraborty
