= Saket Gokhale =

Indian political activist

Member of Parliament, Rajya Sabha
- In office 18 July 2023 – 2 April 2026
- Preceded by: Luizinho Faleiro
- Succeeded by: Rajeev Kumar
- Constituency: West Bengal

Personal details
- Born: 31 January 1987 (age 39)
- Party: Trinamool Congress
- Known for: RTI Activism

Saket Gokhale (born 31 January 1987) is an Indian RTI activist and politician, and the National Spokesperson of Trinamool Congress. He joined TMC in 2021. He had also worked as a foreign correspondent at the Financial Times and at National Public Radio (NPR). He served as member of India's Upper House of Parliament i.e. Rajya Sabha, representing the state of West Bengal from 2023 till 2026.

== Legal affairs ==
In December 2022, he was arrested over a tweet for posting alleged misinformation about 2022 Morbi bridge collapse. After getting bail from a metropolitan court in Ahmedabad, he was re-arrested over the same tweet in a matter of few hours. On 10 December, he was freed on bail.

In January 2023, Gokhale was arrested again by the Enforcement Directorate (ED) over charges of money laundering, as he had allegedly diverted crowdfunded money for personal expenses and investments. The Supreme Court granted him bail in April 2023.

On 30 June 2024, the Delhi High Court directed Saket Gokhale to apologize and pay Rs 50 lakh damages to former diplomat Lakshmi Puri, the wife of Union minister Hardeep Singh Puri, for his defamatory tweets against her over the purchase over the purchase of a property in Switzerland. Hearing the defamation lawsuit filed by the former assistant secretary general of the United Nations, Justice Anup Jairam Bhambhani also restrained the TMC Member of Parliament from publishing any more content on any social media or electronic platform concerning his imputation.
