= Kolkata Police =

Law enforcement agency responsible for Kolkata metropolitan region

Kolkata Police কলকাতা পুলিশ
- Crest of Kolkata Police

- Flag of Kolkata Police
- Abbreviation: KP/KPF; ক: পু
- Motto: "With You – Always" (Bengali: তোমার সহিত – সর্বদা)

Agency overview
- Formed: 1856; 170 years ago
- Annual budget: ₹4,390.722 crore (US$469.1 million) (2025–26)

Jurisdictional structure
- Operations jurisdiction: Kolkata, West Bengal, India
- Kolkata Police Jurisdiction Area
- Area: 204.77 sq mi (530.4 km^{2})
- Population: 62,80,544 (within 200.71 km²)
- Legal jurisdiction: As per operations jurisdiction
- Governing body: Department of Home and Hill Affairs, Government of West Bengal
- Constituting instrument: The Calcutta Police Act, 1866 & Calcutta (Suburban Police) Act, 1866
- General nature: Gendarmerie; Local civilian police

Operational structure
- Headquarters: 18, Lalbazar Street, Kolkata - 700001
- Police officers: 37,400
- Police Commissioner responsible: Ajay Kumar Nand, IPS, Police Commissioner of Kolkata
- Divisions: 10: North and North Suburban Division; Central Division; Eastern Suburban Division; South Division; Port Division; South East Division; South Suburban Division; South West Division; East Division; Bhangar Division

Facilities
- Police Stations: 91
- Cars & Bikes: 4000+: Harley-Davidson Street 750; TATA Nexon.ev; Mahindra TUV 300; Mahindra Rakshak; Mahindra Marksman
- Dogs: 54
- Horses: 65

Website
- www.kolkatapolice.gov.in

The Kolkata Police (Bengali: কলকাতা পুলিশ) is the territorial police force responsible for law enforcement and crime prevention within the metropolitan area of the city of Kolkata, West Bengal. It is one of the two primary police forces in West Bengal, the other being the West Bengal Police. Kolkata Police is the oldest Police Commissionerate established under the British Indian administrative system. The Commissionerate system was introduced in the Presidency towns under Act XIII of 1856 and headed by a Commissioner of Police.

Established in its current form by the legislature of British India in 1856, the main operational area covered by the Kolkata Police is the Kolkata Metropolitan Region, excluding the neighbouring cities of Howrah (covered by the Howrah City Police), Barrackpore (covered by the Barrackpore City Police), Chandannagar (covered by the Chandannagar City Police) and the neighbouring locality of New Town (covered by the Bidhannagar City Police)

The primary functions of the Kolkata Police Force are maintaining law and order in the city, traffic management, prevention and detection of crime and co-ordinating various citizen-centric services for the people of Kolkata. As of 2024, Kolkata Police has ten divisions covering 91 police stations. It has a strength of approximately 37,400 and a territorial jurisdiction of c. 530.34 km^{2} (204.77 sq mi). In addition to general policing, the Kolkata Police has several specialist branches and nine battalions of the Armed Police.

== History ==
=== Early years (17th century) ===
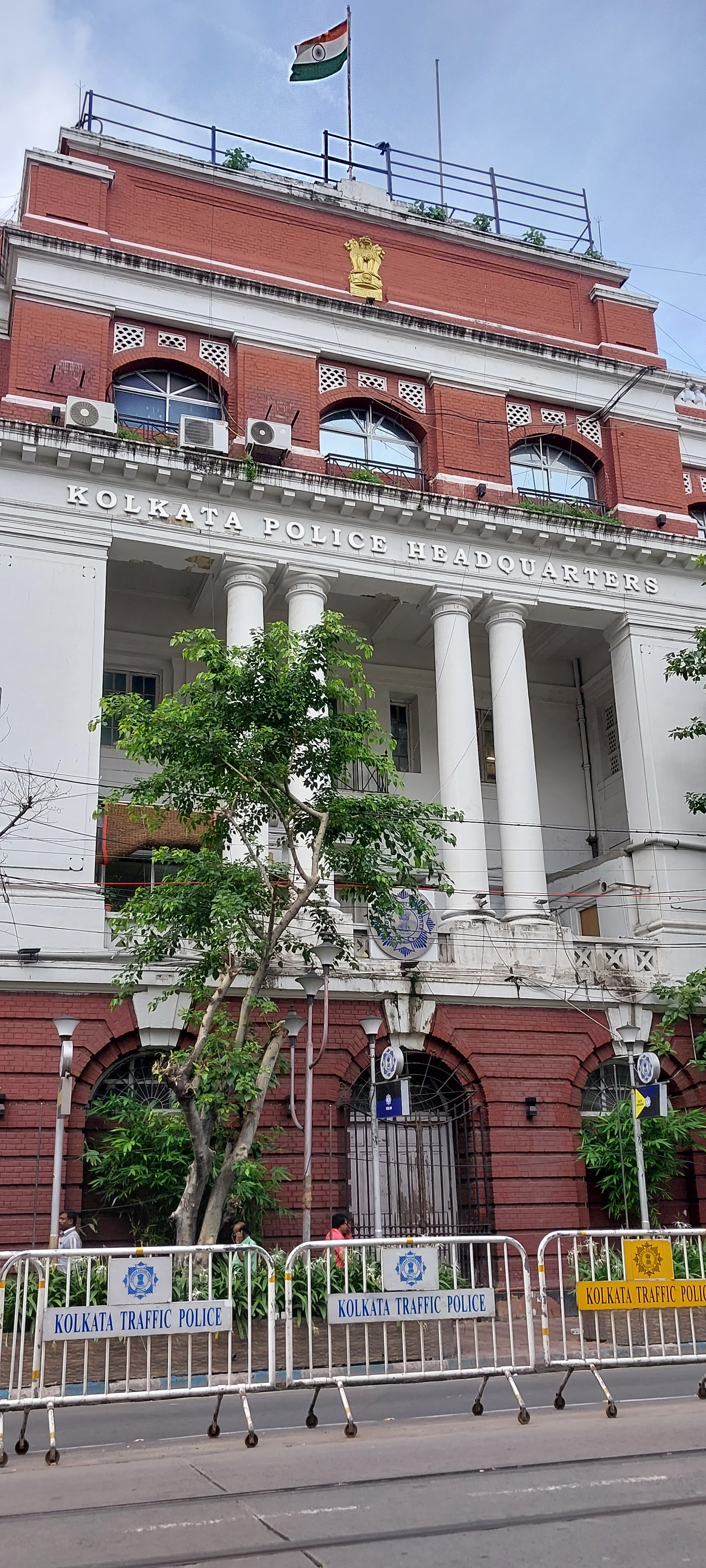
Kolkata Police HQ at Lalbazar Street

The history of the present structure of policing in Kolkata goes back to East India company times, when the city was known as "Calcutta", and was an early settlement of the English East India Company. Calcutta was founded on the eastern banks of the Hooghly by an Englishman, Job Charnock in 1690. Policing in Calcutta's earliest days was confined to the Mughal administration and their local representatives. Bengal was still technically a part of the Mughal Empire, but the Nawabs of Bengal, based in Murshidabad in Northern South Bengal, were its effective rulers. The watch and ward functions were entrusted to a Kotwal or town prefect who had 45 peons under him, armed with traditional weapons like staves and spears, to deal with miscreants.

=== East India Company Police (1720–1845) ===
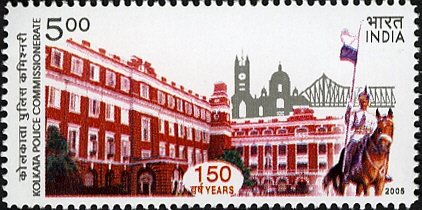
Kolkata Police Commissionerate - 150 years Commemorative Stamp issued in 2005

In 1720, the East India Company formally appointed an officer to be in charge of civil and criminal administration. He was assisted by an Indian functionary commonly known as black deputy or black zamindar. Under him were three naib-dewans, one of whom was in charge of the police. The settlement was divided into "thanas" (police stations) under "thanadars" who had in turn contingents of "naiks" and "paiks". A small contingent of river police was also formed. A statute passed in 1778 raised the strength of the police in Calcutta to 700 paiks, 31 thanadars and 34 naibs under a superintendent. In 1785 commissioners of conservancy were appointed for the town who also looked after watch and ward. Policing was still very loosely organised. In 1794, justices of peace were appointed for the municipal administration of Calcutta and its suburbs, under a chief magistrate who was directly in charge of the Police. In 1806 justices of peace were constituted as magistrates of 24 Parganas and parts of the adjacent districts within a 20-mile radius of the town.

=== Consolidation (1845–1866) ===
The middle decades of the 19th century witnessed a greater systematisation and institutionalisation of policing in Calcutta. A city magistrate named William Coats Blacquiere inaugurated a network of spies or goendas (Bengali: গোয়েন্দা). In 1845 a committee under J.H. Patton brought about key changes in police organisation which now began to be modelled on the London Metropolitan Police. A Commissioner of Police was appointed with powers of a justice of peace to preserve law and order, detect crime and apprehend offenders. In 1856 the Governor-General promulgated an Act treating the Calcutta Police as a separate organisation and S. Wauchope, who was then the chief magistrate of Calcutta, was appointed as the first Commissioner of Police.

1857 was a difficult time for the English East India Company. The year saw the first upsurge against British rule. The rebellion led to the dissolution of the East India Company in 1858. It also led the British to reorganise the army, the financial system and the administration in India. The country was thereafter directly governed by the crown as the new British Raj. Commissioner Wauchope handled the situation ably and was knighted for his achievement. During the incumbency of his successor V.H. Schalch the Calcutta Police Act and the Calcutta Suburban Police Act were enacted in 1866.

=== Modernisation (1866–1947) ===
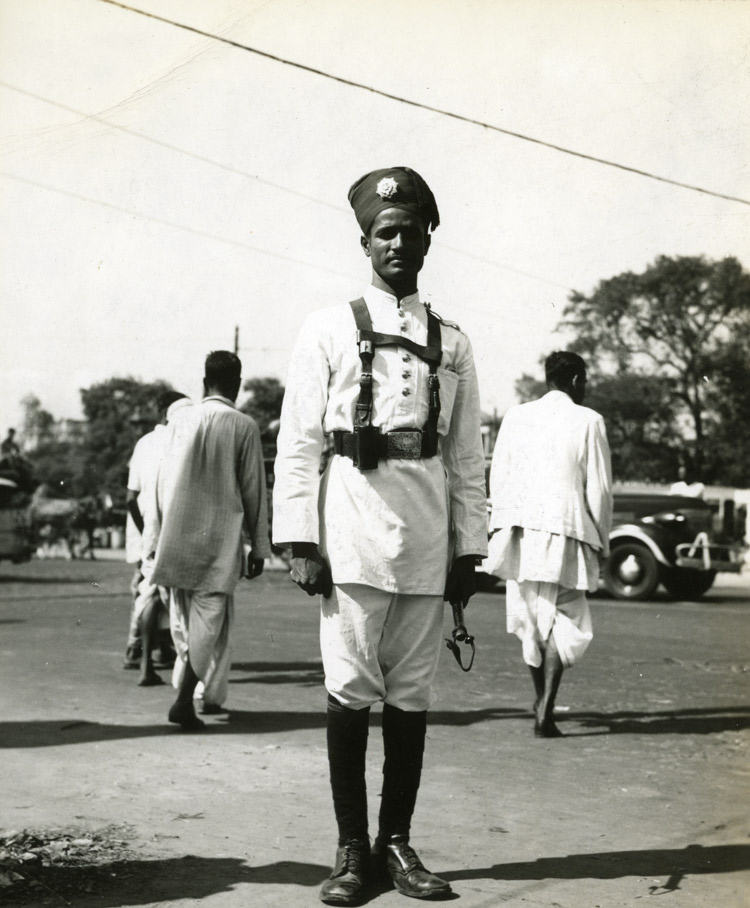
A Kolkata policeman in 1944

In 1868, Sir Stuart Hogg set up the Detective Department in Calcutta Police with A. Younan as the superintendent and R. Lamb as the first-class inspector. Hogg was both the Commissioner of Police and the Chairman of the Calcutta Municipal Corporation. Sir Frederick James Halliday, who was appointed as the Commissioner of Police in 1906, also introduced several changes in the administration of Calcutta Police including the system of running a Control Room. In response to the threat of the nationalist organisation Anushilan Samiti, Haliday oversaw the creation of the Special Branch in June 1909 on the recommendation of Sir Charles Augustus Tegart. For his numerous contributions to the growth of the city police, he is regarded as the father of modern Calcutta Police. Sir Charles Augustus Tegart headed the Detective Department was the first cadre of the Indian Police (IP) force in the organisation. He reorganised the city police force and made it efficient. A highly decorated officer, he was the Commissioner of Police from 1923 to 1931 and was admired for keeping the city free from crime. However, he was unpopular with freedom fighters and his encounters with revolutionaries are a part of popular Bengali folklore. The same time saw the rise of three Bengali police officers named Ramgati Banerjee, Sukumar Sengupta and Zakir Hussain. During the Salt March movement in 1930, the Calcutta Police was headed by Charles Tegart as Police Commissioner, Ramgati Banerjee as DC (South) and Sukumar Sengupta as DC (North). Later, Banerjee left his position and took up teaching as a profession, and Hussain left the job to become the First Inspector-General of East Pakistan. Sukumar Sengupta continued in the job to become the first Bengali Inspector General of Police, West Bengal soon after independence.

=== Post-independence (1947 onward) ===
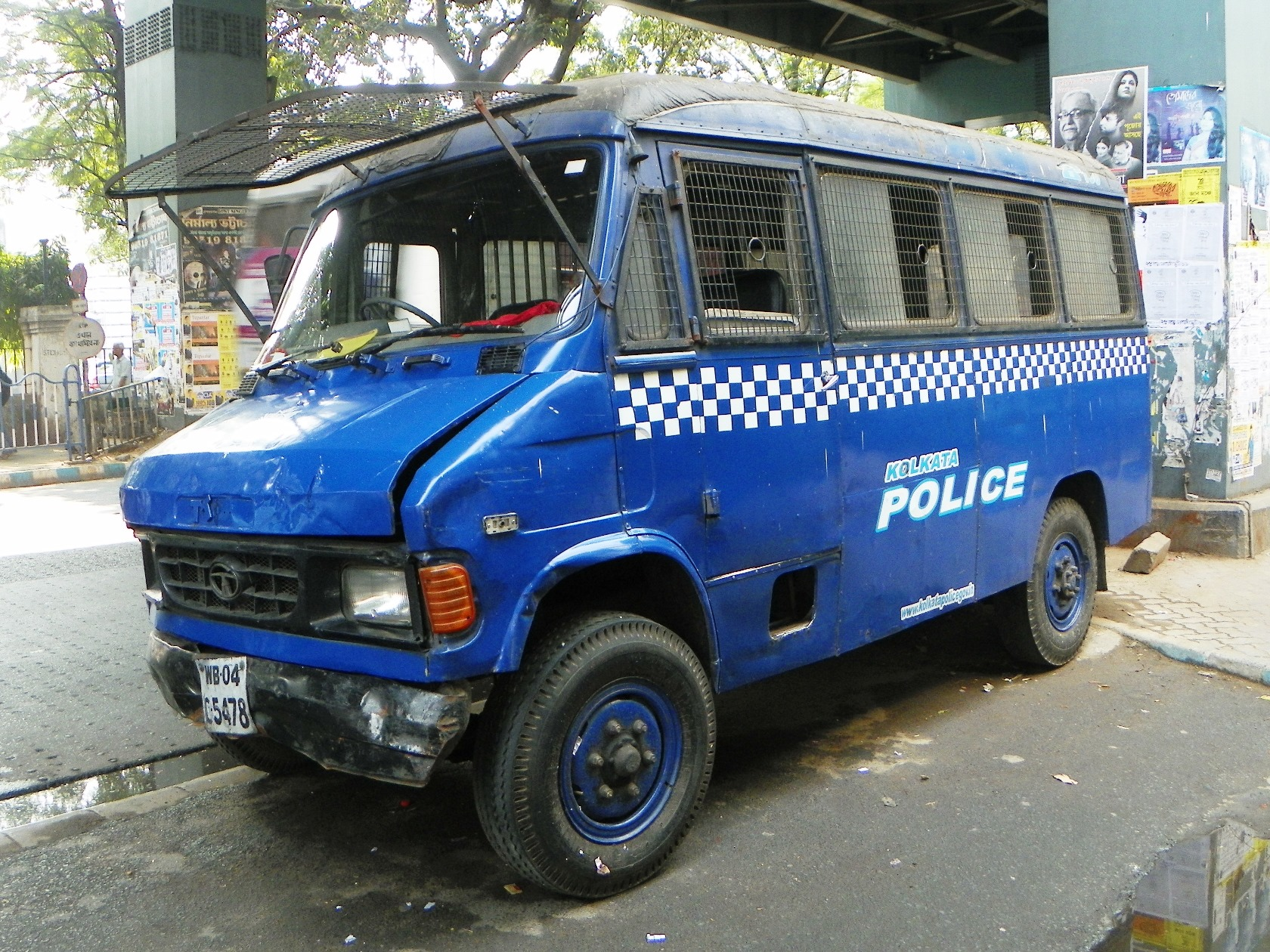
A Kolkata Police van

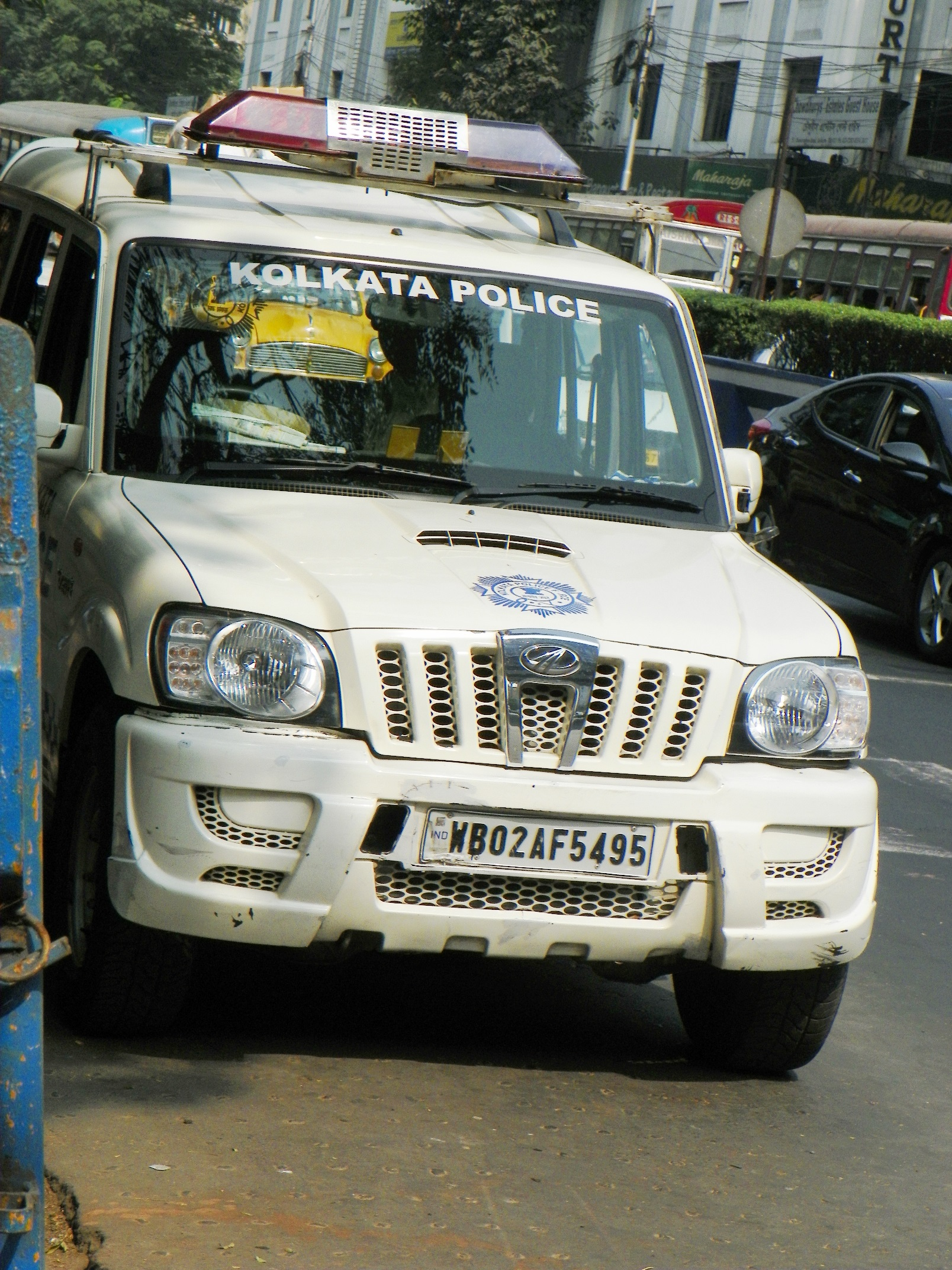
Kolkata Police vehicle parked at roadside

The colonial history of the Calcutta Police force was primarily repressive and anti-nationalist. After India gained independence from British rule in 1947, Calcutta Police was re-organised as an essential element of the Indian law enforcement agencies. Surendra Nath Chatterjee was the first Indian Commissioner of Police. As of 2024, Kolkata Police has ten divisions covering 91 police stations. It has a strength of approximately 37,400 and a territorial jurisdiction of c. 530.34 km^{2} (204.77 sq mi). There are nine battalions of armed forces as well as specialised branches.

== Emblem ==
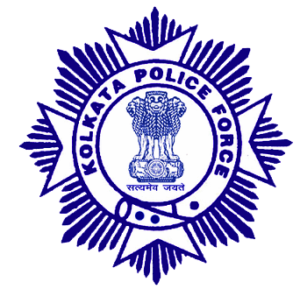
Emblem of Kolkata Police

The emblem of the Kolkata Police, as a vestige of the colonial era, signifies its heritage and allegiance, both of the past and the present, formerly to the British Crown and since 1947, to the Indian Union.

It comprises the Maltese Cross surrounded by the Brunswick star—also featured on the emblems of all British territorial police forces and in India, the Garhwal Rifles (formerly the Royal Garhwal Rifles) regiment of the Indian Army and the Madhya Pradesh Police. In the centre, the State Emblem is featured above the national motto—Satyameva Jayate—taken from the Mundaka Upanishad.

The emblem of the Kolkata Police also contains several symbolic elements as is described officially. At its center is the Ashoka Stambha, adopted from the Lion Capital of Ashoka at Sarnath. The 24-spoked wheel, known as the Dharma Chakra, represents righteousness and moral duty. Below it is the inscription “Satyameva Jayate”, meaning “Truth Alone Triumphs”. Between the two circles surrounding the Ashoka Stambha is the peacock, the national bird of India. The emblem represents truth, courage, and justice, reflecting the moral responsibility of law enforcement officers to uphold and set an example of lawful conduct.

== Organisational structure ==
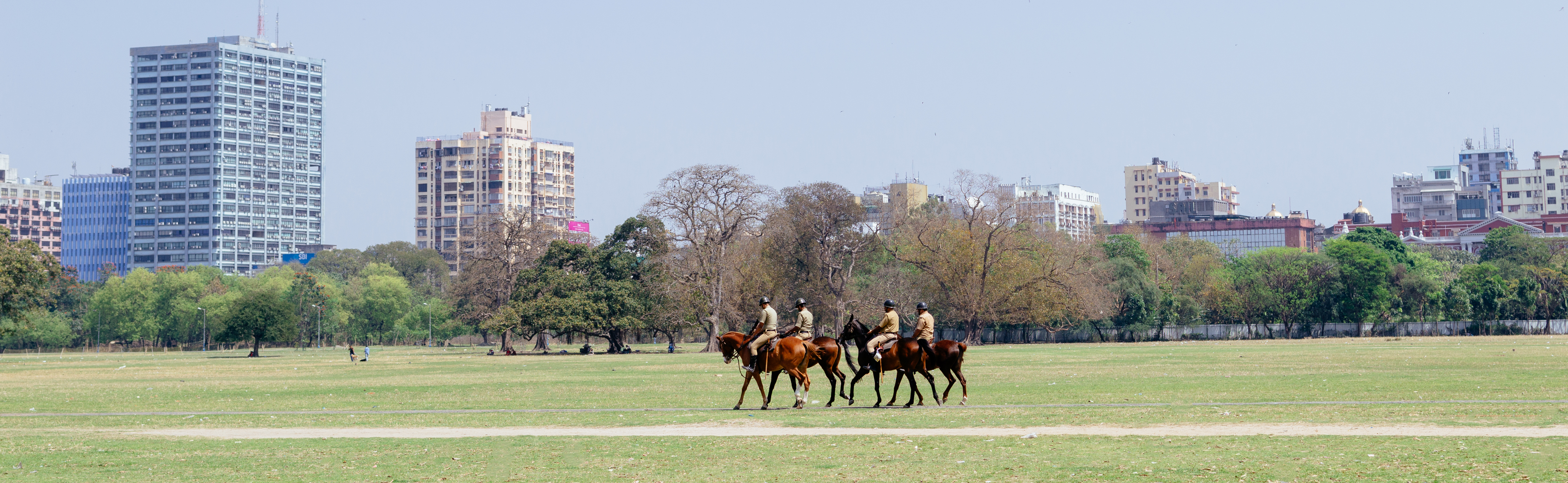
Officers of Kolkata mounted police riding across the Maidan Ground, Kolkata.

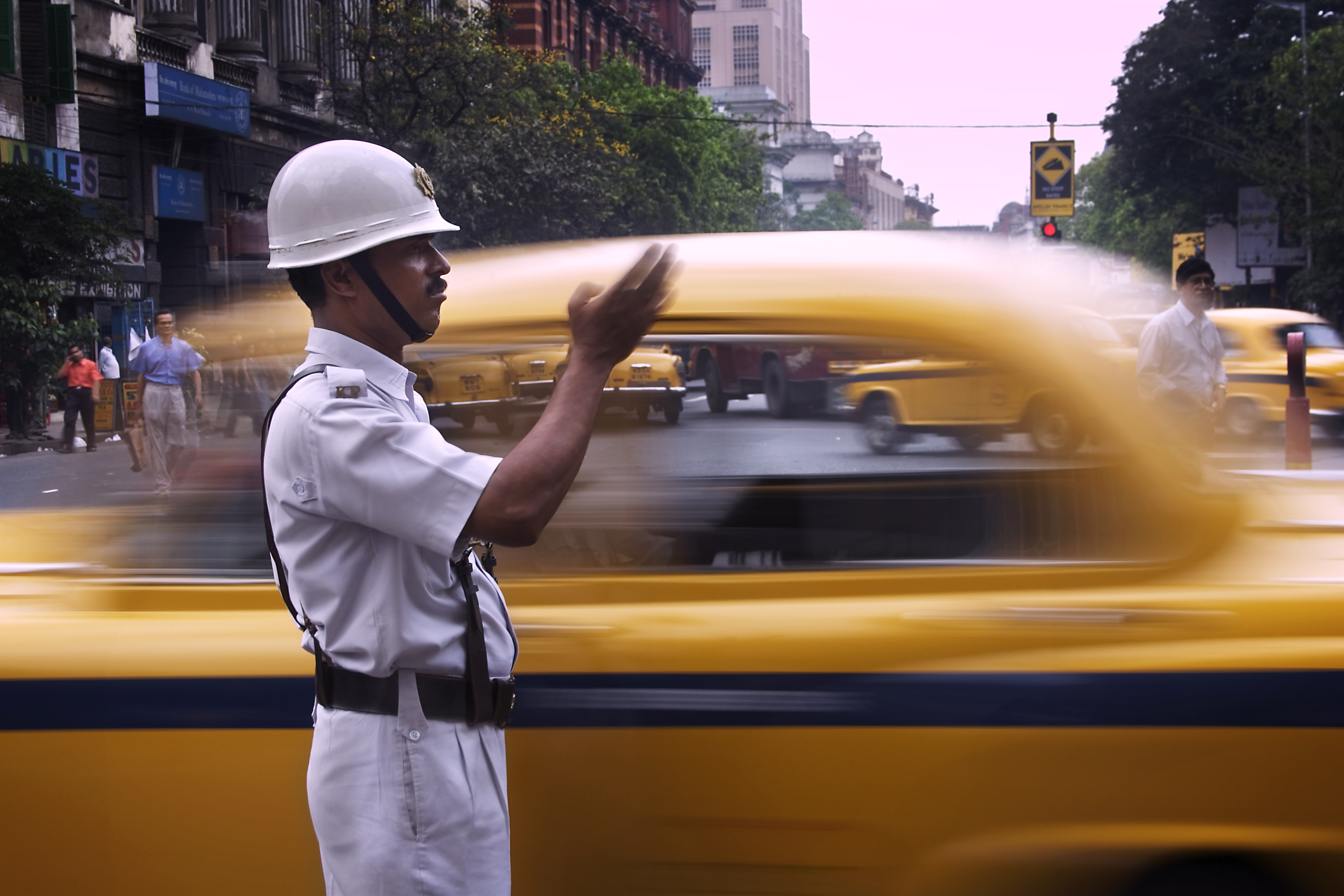
White uniformed Traffic Police directing traffic in Kolkata.

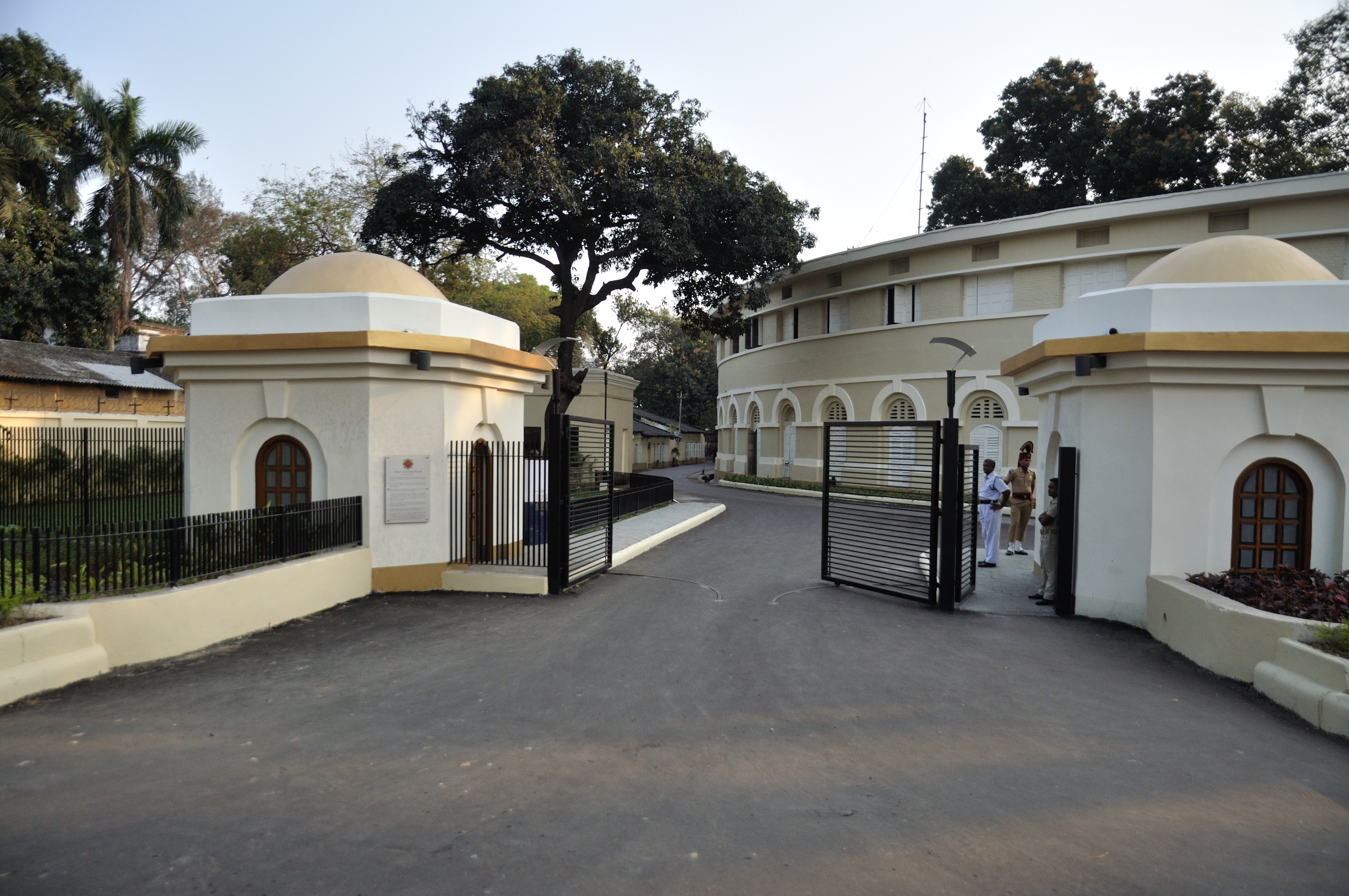
Police Training School, Kolkata

As of 2024, Kolkata Police has ten divisions covering 91 police stations. It has a strength of 37,400 approximately and a territorial jurisdiction of 530.34 km^{2} (204.77 sq mi). The commissioner is the chief of the Kolkata Police. The Commissioner is appointed by the Government of West Bengal and reports independently to the Home Minister of the State. The headquarters are at 18, Lalbazar Street, near B.B.D. Bagh area in Central Kolkata. The Commissioner is an Indian Police Service officer of the rank of Additional DG & IG of Police. IPS Ajay Nand is the present Commissioner. The State Government vests the Commissioner with the powers of a magistrate of First Class with limits within the suburbs of Kolkata. He has power to issue orders with his discretion.

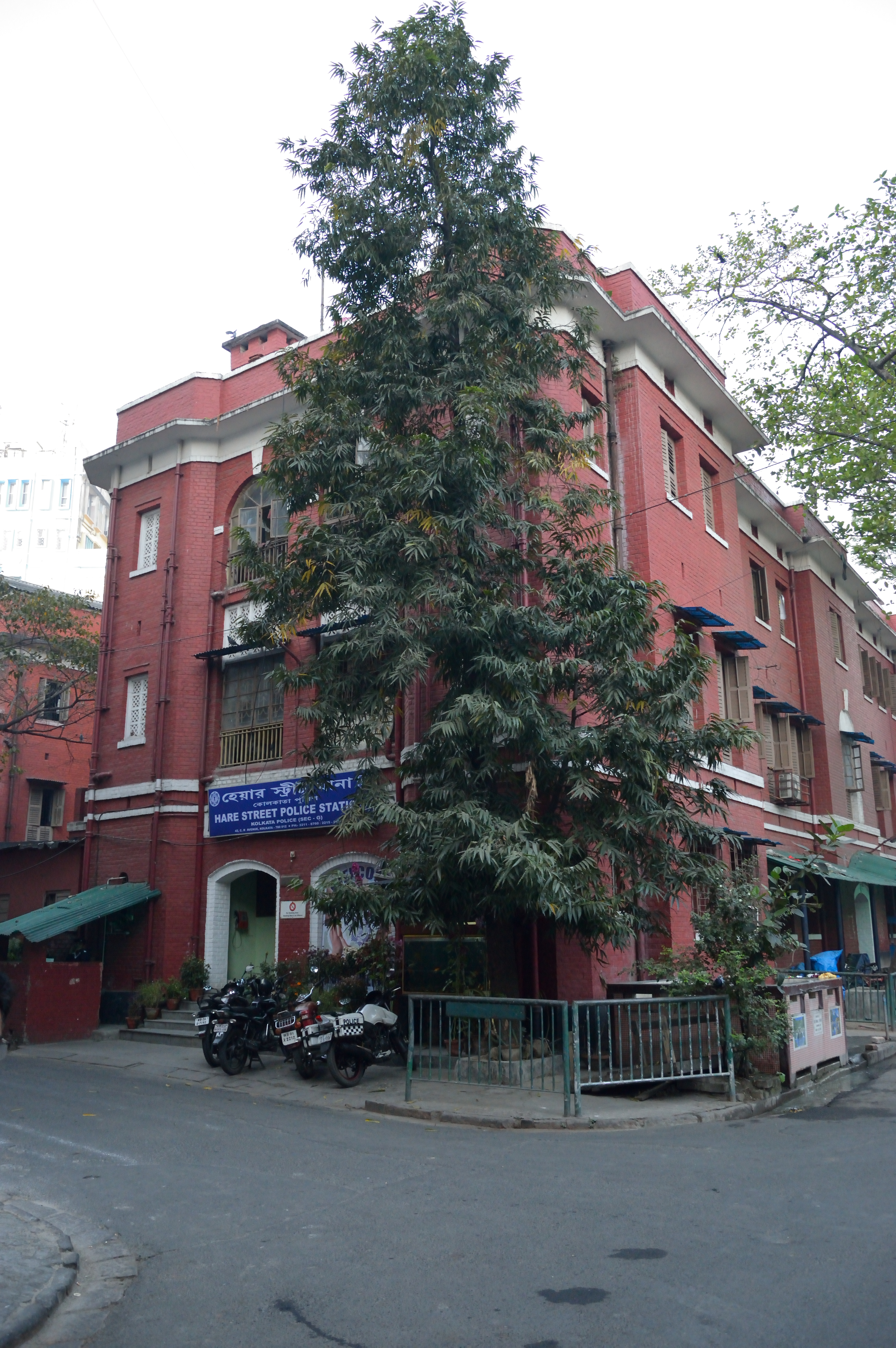
Hare Street Police Station

=== Units ===
Divisions

1. South Division
2. North and North Suburban Division
3. Central Division
4. Eastern Suburban Division
5. Port Division
6. South East Division
7. South Suburban Division (Jadavpur Division)
8. South West Division (Behala Division)
9. East Division
10. Bhangar Division

Branches

1. Detective Department
2. Special Branch
3. Enforcement Branch
4. Kolkata Traffic Police
5. Wireless Branch
6. Security Control Organisation

Other units

1. Police Training School
2. Home Guard Organisation
3. Special Task Force
4. The Kolkata Armed Police (KAP) are West Bengal's state armed police force or provincial state reserved constabulary for operations in Kolkata. The KAP is part of the KPF and consists of nine battalions and three special units. The special units are the RAF, the Commando Force (approximately 200 members) and the Combat Force.

=== Rank structure ===
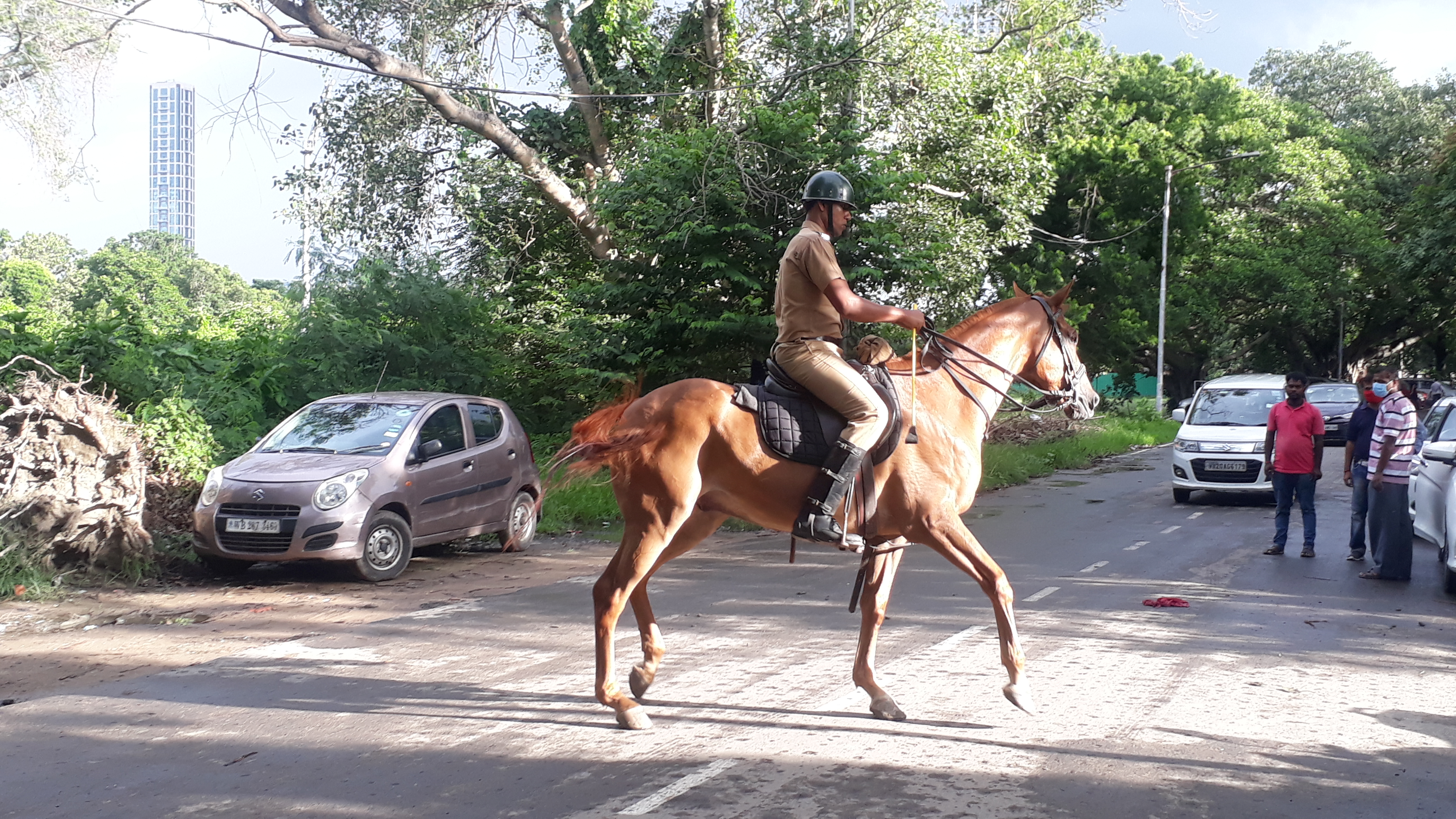
Mounted Police in Kolkata

The rank structure of the Kolkata Police, for the most part, resembles those of other Indian police forces. However, the ranks of Sergeant and Sergeant-Major are unique to the force. They were originally established as direct-entry ranks reserved for Europeans and Anglo-Indians during the British Raj, but were made available to Indians shortly after independence. Ronald Allen Moore, one of the final Anglo-Indian officers of the Kolkata Police (the erstwhile Calcutta Police) joined the force in the rank of Sergeant, retiring in the 1960s as a Senior Deputy Commissioner. Soon after, the rank of Sergeant-Major fell out of use and was abolished for the majority of the force. Nevertheless, the Kolkata Mounted Police retains the rank to this day.

The ranks of Sergeant and Sergeant-Major were represented by three chevrons and the national emblem (both on the arms) respectively until the 1990s, much like a Havildar/Sergeant and Company Havildar Major/Company Sergeant Major in the Indian Army, respectively. This made both ranks part of the non-commissioned officer group, and both ranks were below Assistant Sub-Inspector. However, in the 1990s, force-wide reforms were instated to put Sergeants at higher authority as compared to Assistant Sub-Inspectors, and Sergeant-Major as higher authority as compared to Sub-Inspectors. However, the ranks of Sergeant-Major and Sub-Inspector (both full and assistant) do not exist independently, as the Kolkata Mounted Police does not use the ranks of Sub-Inspector and Assistant Sub-Inspector, whereas other divisions do not use the rank of Sergeant-Major.

The Kolkata Police is unique in India in that it does not use the conventional five-pointed star for the insignia of ranks of Inspector and Assistant Commissioner. Instead, the four-pointed Star of the Order of the Bath—used for officer ranks in the Indian Army from its inception till 1950 (when India became a republic and adopted the five-pointed star in place of the Bath star) and also in the militaries/police forces of the United Kingdom and the wider Commonwealth—or the 'pip' (as it is called colloquially in the Commonwealth) is used. The pip, largely a legacy of the colonial era, was used for all ranks of the force (from Inspector to Commissioner, then equated to a Colonel instead of a Lieutenant-General like today) until 1947, when new regulations stipulated that higher officers of the force (at and above the ranks of Deputy Commissioner) were to be drawn from the Indian Police Service (the erstwhile Imperial Police) instead of directly being selected from the lower and middle ranks of the force itself. Consequently, the five-pointed star used by the Imperial Police (and later the Army and all other services) came into use. However, it has remained as the rank insignia for Inspectors and Assistant Commissioners, as holders of those ranks are drawn from the force itself.

Kolkata Police gazetted officer rank structure
Rank group	Indian Police Service				Kolkata Police
	Commissioner of Police	Additional Commissioner of Police	Joint Commissioner of Police	Deputy Commissioner of Police	Assistant Commissioner of Police	Inspector
Equivalent in state police	Director-General of Police	Inspector-General of Police	Deputy Inspector-General of Police	Superintendent of Police	Deputy Superintendent of Police

Kolkata Police junior ranks rank structure
NCOs				Enlisted
				No insignia
Sergeant Major	Sub-Inspector/Subedar/Wireless Supervisor	Sergeant	Assistant Sub-Inspector	Police Constable/Sepoy/Sowar/Syce

- The title of Subedar replaces the rank of Sub-Inspector in the Armed Police.
- The title of Wireless Supervisor replaces the rank of Sub-Inspector in the Police Control Room.
- Head Sowar, Syce and Sowar replace the rank of Police Constable in the Mounted Police.
- Sepoy replaces the rank of Police Constable in the Armed Police.

=== Jurisdiction ===
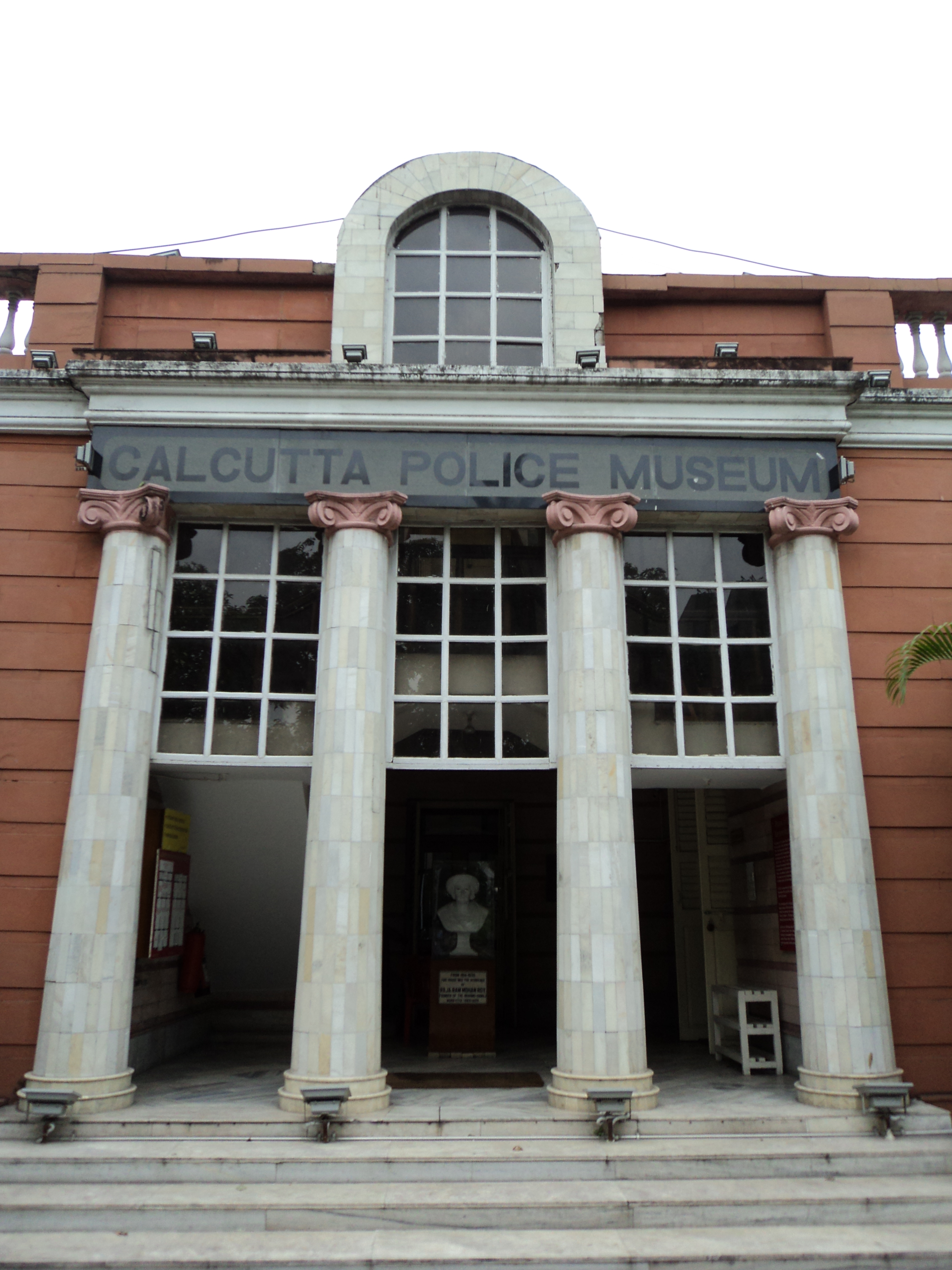
Kolkata Police Museum

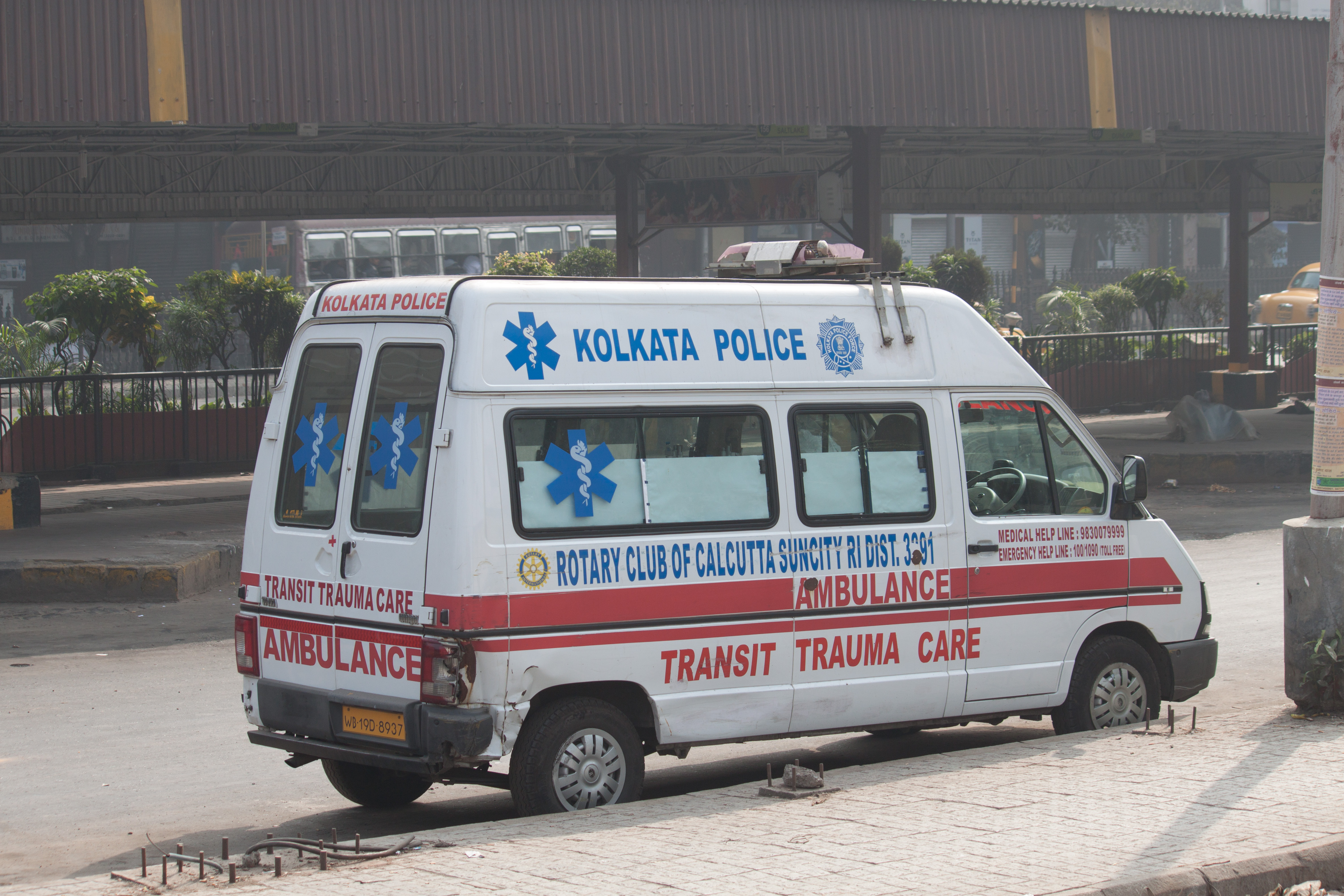
A Kolkata police ambulance

The jurisdiction of the Kolkata Police covers the area of Kolkata District and an adjacent area as well. That adjacent area, like Kolkata District, is within the boundaries of the Kolkata Municipal Corporation. The Kolkata Police's entire area comprises all 144 wards of the KMC. In March 2009 Kolkata police took 17 police stations of North and South 24-Pargana district under its wing. In September 2011 Kolkata police again extended their jurisdiction to 17 more police stations in the adjacent South 24-Parganas district in an effort to improve police service. A major expansion took place in January 2024 with Kolkata Police acquiring charge of Bhangore area in South 24 Parganas forming the 10th and new Bhangore Division of the force along with a new Traffic Guard at Bhangore. This added 8 new police stations to area covered by Lal Bazar

== Equipment ==
- M4 Carbine
- INSAS rifle in 5.56mm NATO
- OFB Excalibur Rifle
- Revolvers
- Pistol Auto 9mm 1A
- Ghaatak
- Heckler & Koch MP5
- Sterling Submachine Gun: Indian Version
- SLR: Indian Version of FN FAL
- 7.62mm SLR: With special tube attachment.
- Lee-Enfield .303 British Rifle : Indian Version
- OFB 12 Bore Pump Action Gun.
- 51mm Mortar
- 0.203 Riot Gun
- Gas Gun
- Grenade
- Colt XM177
- M16A2
- SIG SG 551

== Criticism and Controversies ==
The Kolkata Police has a history of failure to maintain law and order, as well as engaging in religious appeasement as per opinion of the opponent parties in West Bengal. The department has been severely criticized for being politically involved, along with targeting political critics and content creators.

The Kolkata Police was criticized in the investigation of suicide of Rizwanur Rahman in September 2007, who was involved in an interfaith marriage with the daughter of businessman Ashok Todi. Several officers, including then commissioner Prasun Mukherjee, were involved in torturing Rahman after being in cahoots with Todi. The case was subsequently transferred to the CBI after a State Government order.

Kolkata Police was also criticized for inaction in the Ekbalpur triple murder case.

=== Politically Motivated Actions ===
During the 2024 elections, the cyber division of Kolkata Police issued warnings to 2 X users to disclose their identity or face charges under Section 149 of CrPC, after posting a meme video of Trinamool Congress leader and CM Mamata Banerjee dancing. However, the warning was rescinded and the tweet by the department was deleted, after BJP leader Narendra Modi retweeted the similar meme created by the users and found it entertaining.

On 30 May 2025, following the Pahalgam Terror attack and the retaliatory strikes, the Kolkata Police arrested law student and influencer Sharmistha Panoli in Gurugram, after she posted a viral video which criticized Pakistan for its support towards Islamic terrorism and allegedly used disrespectful language towards the Islamic prophet Muhammad, prompting a backlash from the Islamic community across Muslim nations; Panoli claimed that some also issued death and rape threats to her. The department faced backlash across various social media platforms, such as Twitter, for targeting her after an arrest warrant was issued against her for hurting religious sentiments, but not taking action against those who issued death and rape threats. Subsequently, Panoli was granted bail, while her complainant, Wajahat Khan, who had a history of hurting religious sentiments of Hindus and hate speech, was arrested after absconding for days.

On 16 August 2025, during the trailer launch of The Bengal Files at a Kolkata hotel, which was initially planned at a movie theatre, the screening was abruptly halted by Kolkata Police. In response, director Vivek Agnihotri launched a scathing criticism against the West Bengal Government for stopping the screening for political reasons and labelled the action as dictatorship, despite being approved by the CBFC. Subsequently, senior officers of the department stated that Agnihotri did not have the permission for the screening.

=== Anti-Bicycle Policies and Actions ===
The Kolkata Police has been infamously known for its anti-bicycle policies by enforcing arbitrary rules and imposing blanket bans on bicycles on major roads and throughfares since 2008. The ban has been imposed to improve traffic flows, and violation of such bans has led to imposing a fine of Rs 100-300 or seizing of bicycles, along with harassment of riders at the hands of police officials. There have been protests against such bans, as bicycles have neither caused traffic congestion by traffic experts, nor the ban was approved by the State Government. The fines imposed against bicyclists do not conform to the violations in the Motor Vehicles Act, as the Act does not mention any penalties against bicyclists. Furthermore, traffic officers who impose penalties issue small slips, which are chits of plain paper a little bigger than postage stamps, with a traffic police stamp, which incensed corruption and bribery. As a result of the ban, Public Interest Litigations were filed in the Kolkata High Court in 2014 against the traffic police department, which subsequently reduced the ban of bicycles from 174 to 62 thoroughfares following the court's intervention. Despite not being mandated in the Motor Vehicles Act, the Kolkata Traffic Police has been involved in seizing and impounding bicycles of riders defying or violating the ban.

Since 2018, the Kolkata Police has been condemned for being iron-handed towards bicyclists at several instances, such as performing stunts, and riding on pedestrian sidewalks/footpaths. The department tried to raise the penalties from ₹ 100 to 1000 for violators performing stunts, but since bicyclists do not require licenses, it was resisted and not implemented. Furthermore, beginning November 2021, the department began to target bicyclists who are found drunk and began to charge riders under the section 510 of the Indian Penal Code (later section 24 of Bharatiya Nyaya Sanhita) instead of section 185 of the Motor Vehicles Act for public intoxication rather than drunken pedaling.

=== Handling of the 2024 Kolkata rape and murder ===
The Kolkata Police faced criticism for its handling of the 2024 Kolkata rape and murder and the protests that followed it, where in August 2024, a female doctor on night duty at R. G. Kar Medical College and Hospital in North Kolkata was raped and murdered. One civic police volunteer—who had a history of violence against women—was arrested by the Kolkata Police in connection with the murder. On the night of 14 August, during the initial protest, a mob comprising hundreds of vandals—widely accused of belonging to the ruling party of West Bengal, the [mob]—ransacked the hospital and in doing so, destroyed much of the physical evidence present within it. The Kolkata Police were accused of inaction against the mob. Following this, dissent and defamatory speech on social media (most famously on Twitter) aimed against the force and government's handling of the case was met with cease and desist notices sent by the Kolkata Police's cyber police station, under section 168 of the Bharatiya Nagarik Suraksha Sanhita (or the Code of Criminal Procedure). The Calcutta High Court transferred the case over to the purview of the Central Bureau of Investigation soon after the protests erupted. On 20 August, the Supreme Court took suo moto cognizance of the matter. The Court criticised the state government and its machinery (including the Kolkata Police), among other institutions involved in the incident.

On 14 September, Inspector Abhijit Mondal of the Kolkata Police was arrested by the CBI for destruction of evidence, compromising the scene of crime and delay in filing a first information report (FIR) as per demand of opponent parties of West Bengal. Three days later, the state government replaced Kolkata Police Commissioner Vineet Kumar Goyal on demand of the protestors and appointed Manoj Verma as Commissioner.

During the Durga Puja festivities in October 2024, nine protesters were arrested by the Kolkata Police at a puja pandal in Ballygunge for charges under various sections of the Bharatiya Nyaya Sanhita (or the Indian Penal Code), including unlawful assembly, assaulting an on-duty public servant and public mischief. The Calcutta High Court granted bail to the protesters, noting that prima facie neither were their actions politically or religiously motivated, nor was there any evidence of criminal intent as they did not harm anyone; setting the bond at ₹1,000.

== Recreation ==
Kolkata Police operates Police Athletic Club (abbreviated Police AC), a team that competes in the Premier Division of the Calcutta Football League.

== See also ==
- Divisions of Kolkata Police
- West Bengal Police
- CID West Bengal
- Bidhannagar Police Commissionerate
- Barrackpore Police Commissionerate
- Chandannagar Police Commissionerate
- Howrah Police Commissionerate
- Asansol–Durgapur Police Commissionerate
- Siliguri Police Commissionerate
- Indian Imperial Police
- Kolkata Police community policing initiatives
- Kolkata Police Friendship Cup
