= Bhawanipur Education Society College =

College in Kolkata, India

The Bhawanipur Education Society College
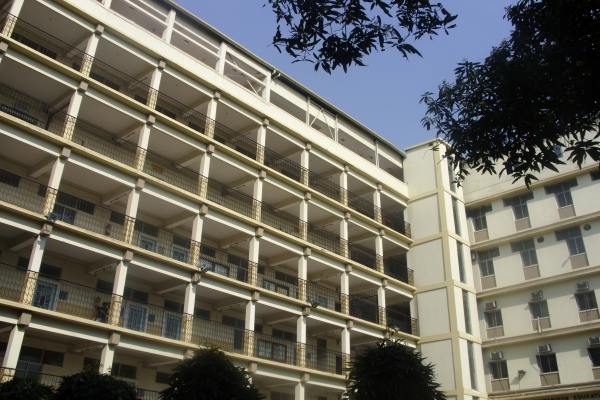
- Bhawanipur College main building
- Type: Private research university
- Established: 1966; 60 years ago
- Affiliations: University of Calcutta
- Chairman: Rajnikant Dani
- Teacher-in-charge: Dr. Subhabrata Gangopadhyay
- Location: Kolkata, West Bengal, India; 22.5380°N 88.3530°E
- Campus: Urban
- Website: www.thebges.edu.in
- Location in Kolkata Location in India

Bhawanipur Education Society College (or Bhawanipur College) is a private, co-educational, undergraduate college affiliated with the University of Calcutta in Kolkata, India. It is at 5, Lala Lajpat Rai Sarani (Elgin Road) of the Bhowanipore area of Kolkata. As per, December 2024, the Bhawanipore Gujarati Education Society College (BESC) will be upgraded to university status.

== History ==
The college was started in 1966 for boys and girls by the efforts and donation of money and land by Gujarati community living in Kolkata. The Six-storied building was constructed with major donations from other city-based Gujarati industrialists and businessman. The college is managed through The Bhawanipur Gujarati Education Society. The Society enjoys the status of linguistic Minority Educational Institutions under Article 30(1) of the Constitution of India.

It grew out of a school named J. J. Ajmera High School, established in 1928, which became a secondary school in 1958 and later a higher secondary school, founded in 1960 and run by the same trust. The college was known as Bhawanipur Gujarati Education Society College (BGES College) but since 2002, the word Gujarati has been dropped. Its popular name is Bhawanipur College.

Established by Gujaratis, a linguistic minority in West Bengal, it enjoys protection under Article 30 (1) of the constitution of India. Meant for educating children of the Gujarati community, it has, over the years opened its doors to all eligible students, irrespective of caste, creed, religion or language.*

Umang is the annual cultural fest and the college also conducts Model United Nation Conference which was started in 2016.

== Courses ==
=== Degrees ===
The following degrees are offered by the college:

- B.Com (Hons) & General
- B.B.A. (Hons)
- B.A. (Hons) English
- B.A. (Hons) Journalism and Mass Communication
- B.A. (Hons) Political Science
- B.A. (Hons) Sociology
- B.A. (Hons) History
- B.A. (Hons) Bengali
- B.Sc. (Hons) Mathematics
- B.Sc. (Hons) Chemistry
- B.Sc. (Hons) Physics
- B.Sc. (Hons) Economics
- B.Sc. (Hons) Computer Science
- B.Sc. (Hons) Electronics
- M.Com Accountancy and Finance
- M.A. English

A sister unit of the college The Bhawanipur Design Academy runs vocational courses in Design Fundamentals, Fashion, Interior, and Textile Design, and also Creative Art, Modelling, Personality Development and Foreign languages including French, Spanish, Chinese, etc.

== Notable alumni ==
- Dilip Sanghvi, one of the richest man in India & founder Sun Pharma
- Ridhima Ghosh, Tollywood actress
- Nusrat Jahan, former Member of Lok Sabha & Tollywood actress
- Jeet, Tollywood actor
- Vishal Vashishtha, TV actor
- Archana Vijaya, model, video jockey, TV & sports anchor
- Bipasha Basu, Bollywood actress
- Naman Shaw, TV actor
- Nicolette Bird, Bollywood actress
- Ashok Todi, Indian industrialist, head Lux Industries Group

== See also ==
- Education in India
- Education in West Bengal
- List of colleges affiliated to the University of Calcutta
