= List of colleges affiliated to the University of Calcutta =

Colleges affiliated with Calcutta University, India

The University of Calcutta, located in Kolkata, West Bengal, is one of the oldest and most renowned educational institutions in South Asia. It was established in 1857. There are several colleges and institutes that are affiliated to this university. At present, there are approximately 160 institutes which comes under this university, which are mostly located in the districts of Kolkata, Howrah, Hooghly, and South 24 Parganas.

== List of affiliated colleges ==
This is the list of colleges in Kolkata.

=== Kolkata ===
- Acharya Girish Chandra Bose College, Kolkata
- Acharya Jagadish Chandra Bose College, Kolkata
- Anandamohan College, Kolkata, day/evening college
- Asutosh College
- Bangabasi College, Kolkata
- Bangabasi Evening College, Kolkata
- Bangabasi Morning College, Kolkata
- Basanti Devi College, Kolkata
- Behala College, Kolkata
- Bengal Music College, Kolkata
- Bethune College, Kolkata
- Bhawanipur Education Society College, Kolkata
- Calcutta Girls BT College, Kolkata
- Calcutta Girls' College, Kolkata
- Charuchandra College, Kolkata
- Chittaranjan College, Kolkata
- City College, Kolkata
- City College of Commerce and Business Administration, Kolkata
- David Hare Training (IASE) College, Kolkata
- Debnarayan Shiksha Sansthan, Sonarpur
- Deshbandhu College for Girls, Kolkata
- Don Bosco College, Park Circus
- EI-Bethel College, Rasapunja
- Goenka College of Commerce and Business Administration, Kolkata
- Gokhale Memorial Girls' College, Kolkata
- Government College of Art & Craft, Kolkata
- Government Girls General Degree College, Ekbalpur, Kolkata
- Gurudas College, Kolkata
- Harimohan Ghose College, Kolkat
- Heramba Chandra College, Kolkata, day college
- Indian Institute of Social Welfare and Business Management, Kolkata
- Institute of Education for Women, Kolkata
- Institute of Jute Technology, Kolkata
- Jagdish Chandra Basu Sikshak Shikshan Mahavidyalaya, Kolkata
- Jogesh Chandra Chaudhuri College, Kolkata
- Jogesh Chandra Chaudhuri Law College, Kolkata
- Jogamaya Devi College, Kolkata, morning college for women
- Kamala Devi Sohanraj Singhvi Jain College of Education, Kolkata
- Khudiram Bose Central College, Kolkata
- Kidderpore College, Kidderpore
- Kishore Bharati Bhagini Nivedita (Co-ed) College, Kolkata
- Lady Brabourne College, Kolkata
- Loreto College, Kolkata
- Maharaja Manindra Chandra College, Kolkata, day college
- Maharaja Sris Chandra College, Kolkata, afternoon/ evening college
- Maharani Kasiswari College, Kolkata, morning college for women
- Matiaburj College, Kolkata
- Maulana Azad College, Kolkata
- Milli Al-Ameen College for Girls, Kolkata
- Muralidhar Girls' College, Kolkata
- Naba Ballygunge Mahavidyalaya, Kolkata
- Netaji Nagar College (Evening), Kolkata
- Netaji Nagar College for Women, Kolkata, morning college
- Netaji Nagar Day College, Kolkata
- New Alipore College, Kolkata
- Prafulla Chandra College, Kolkata, afternoon/ evening college
- Rabin Mukherjee College, Kolkata
- Rammohan College, Kolkata, morning college for women
- Rani Birla Girls' College, Kolkata
- Seth Anandram Jaipuria College, Kolkata
- Sammilani Mahavidyalaya, Kolkata
- Sammilani Teachers Training College, Barakhola
- Sanskrit College, Kolkata
- Sarsuna College, Kolkata
- Savitri Girls' College, Kolkata
- Scottish Church College, Kolkata
- Seth Soorajmull Jalan Girls' College, Kolkata
- Shyambazar Law College, Kolkata
- Sivanath Sastri College, Kolkata, morning college for women
- Shri Shikshayatan College, Kolkata
- Sir Gurudas Mahavidyalaya, Kolkata
- Sister Nibedita Government General Degree College for Girls
- South Calcutta Girls College, Kolkata
- South Calcutta Law College, Kolkata
- St. Paul's Cathedral Mission College, Kolkata
- St. Xavier's College, Kolkata
- State Institute of Physical Education For Women, Kolkata
- Surendranath College for Women, Kolkata
- Surendranath Evening College, Kolkata
- Surendra Lal Das Teachers Training College, Ananda Nagar
- Surendranath Law College, Kolkata
- Surendranath College, Kolkata
- Syamaprasad College, Kolkata, afternoon/ evening college
- Taradevi Harakhchand Kankaria Jain College, Kolkata
- The Heritage College, Anandapur
- Umes Chandra College, Kolkata
- Vedanta College, Phoolbagan
- Victoria Institution (College), Kolkata
- Vidyasagar College for Women, Kolkata
- Vidyasagar College, Kolkata
- Viharilal College for Home and Social Science, Kolkata
- Vijaygarh Jyotish Ray College, Kolkata
- Vivekananda College for Women, Kolkata
- Vivekananda College, Thakurpukur, Kolkata
- Women's Christian College, Kolkata
- Women's College, Kolkata

=== South 24 Parganas district ===
- Al Ameen Memorial Minority College, Baruipur, South 24 Parganas
- Bankim Sardar College, Tengra Khali, South 24 Parganas
- Baruipur College, Baruipur, South 24 Parganas
- Bhangar Mahavidyalaya, Bhangar, South 24 Parganas
- Bikash Bharati Law College, Joyrampur, Amtala, South 24 Parganas
- Budge Budge College, Budge Budge, South 24 Parganas
- Dhola Mahavidyalaya, Dhola, South 24 Parganas
- Dhruba Chand Halder College, Dakshin Barasat, South 24 Parganas
- Dinabandhu Andrews College, Garia, South 24 Parganas, Morning/Day College
- Fakir Chand College, Diamond Harbour, South 24 Parganas
- Jibantala Rokeya Mahavidyalaya, Mallikati, South 24 Parganas
- K. K. Das College, Garia, South 24 Parganas
- L.J.D. College, Punnyahat, PO Saharahat, South 24 Parganas
- Kultali Dr. B .R. Ambedkar College, Kultali, South 24 Parganas
- Magrahat College, Magrahat, South 24 Parganas
- Maheshtala College, Maheshtala, South 24 Parganas
- Panchur College, South 24 Parganas
- Parameswar Mahavidyalaya (B.Ed), South 24 Parganas
- Patharpratima Mahavidyalaya, Patharpratima, South 24 Parganas
- Rabindra Shiksha Sammilani Law College, Subhashgram, South 24 Parganas
- Raidighi B Ed College, Raydighi Abad, South 24 Parganas
- Raidighi College, Raydighi Abad, South 24 Parganas
- Ramakrishna Mission Blind Boys Academy, Narendrapur, South 24 Parganas
- Ramakrishna Mission Residential College, Narendrapur, South 24 Parganas
- Sadhan Chandra Mahavidyalaya, Harindanga, South 24 Parganas
- Sagar Mahavidyalaya, Harinbari, South 24 Parganas
- Saheed Anurup Chandra Mahavidyalaya, Burul, South 24 Parganas
- Sarisa B.Ed College, Sarisha, South 24 Parganas
- Sonarpur Mahavidyalaya, Rajpur Sonarpur, South 24 Parganas
- Shirakole Mahavidyalaya, Sirakol, South 24 Parganas
- Sibani Mandal Mahavidyalaya, Namkhana, South 24 Parganas
- Sukanta College, Bhangankhali, South 24 Parganas
- Sundarban Ashutosh B Ed College for Women, South 24 Parganas
- Sundarban Hazi Desarat College, Pathankhali, South 24 Parganas
- Sundarban Mahavidyalaya, Kakdwip, South 24 Parganas
- Sushil Kar College, Champahati, South 24 Parganas
- Vidyanagar College, Vidyanagar, South 24 Parganas

=== Howrah district ===
- Bijoy Krishna Girls' College, Howrah
- Azad Hind Fouz Smriti Mahavidyalaya, Domjur
- Bagnan College, Bagnan
- Dinabandhu Institution, Mandirtala
- Dr. Kanailal Bhattacharya College, Santragachi
- Gangabharpur Sikshan Mandir, Howrah
- Gangadharpur Mahavidyamandir, Gangadharpur, Howrah
- Jaypur Panchanan Roy College, Howrah
- Lalbaba College, Howrah
- Narasinha Dutt College, Howrah
- Panchla Mahavidyalaya, Howrah
- Prabhu Jagatbandhu College, Andul Mouri
- Puras-Kanpur Haridas Nandi Mahavidyalaya, Kolkata
- Ramakrishna Mission Shikshanamandira, Belur, Howrah
- Ramakrishna Mission Vidyamandira, Belur, Howrah
- Ramsaday College, Amta
- Sovarani Memorial College, Jagatballavpur
- Udaynarayanpur Madhabilata Mahavidyalaya, Udaynarayanpur
- Uluberia College, Uluberia

=== Hooghly district ===
- Bidhan Chandra College, Rishra, Rishra
- George School of Law, Konnagar, Hooghly
- Gourmohan Sachin Mondal Mahavidyalaya, Bireswarpur
- Mahitosh Nandy Mahavidyalaya, Jangipara
- Sree Agrasain College, Liluah
- Serampore College, Serampore
- Serampore Girls' College, Serampore
- Nabagram Hiralal Paul College, Konnagar
- Raja Peary Mohan College, Uttarpara
- Swami Niswambalananda Girls' College, Bhadrakali
- Vidyasagar Mahavidyalaya, Masat
