= Bidhan Chandra College =

Bidhan Chandra College may refer to:

- Bidhan Chandra College, Asansol
- Bidhan Chandra College, Rishra
