= Rupa Company =

Indian clothing manufacturer

Rupa & Company Limited
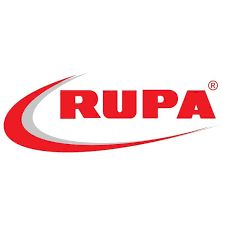
- Trade name: Rupa
- Traded as: BSE: 533552; NSE: RUPA
- Industry: Innerwear & outerwear
- Founded: 1968; 58 years ago
- Founders: PR Agarwala; GP Agarwala; KB Agarwala
- Headquarters: Kolkata, India
- Key people: PR Agarwala (chairman); GP Agarwala (vice chairman); KB Agarwala (managing director)
- Products: Clothing
- Brands: Frontline, Softline, Euro, Bumchums, Torrido, Thermocot, Macroman, Macrowoman, Footline, Jon
- Revenue: ▲₹1,474 crore (US$150 million) (FY22)
- Net income: ▲₹191 crore (US$20 million) (FY22)
- Website: rupa.co.in

Rupa & Company Limited is an Indian clothing company which makes knitted garments. The Company is primarily engaged in the manufacture of hosiery products in knitted undergarments casual wears and thermal wears. It produces innerwear, casual wear, thermal wear and sleepwear for men, women, and kids. While Frontline is its flagship brand, the Rupa family also consists of brands like Softline, Euro, Bumchums, Torrido, Thermocot, Macroman, Footline, and Jon. Rupa was founded and established by brothers PR Agarwala, GP Agarwala and KB Agarwala in 1968 when the erstwhile hosiery market was at a nascent stage and mainly addressed by unorganized players.

== Products ==
Rupa produces vests, briefs, drawers, Bermuda shorts, Capris, T-shirts, lounge wear, boxer shorts and sleepwear for men; and bras, panties, camisoles and leggings for women. It also manufactures baba suits, bloomers and slips for infants/toddlers, and lounge-wear, Bermuda shorts and T-shirts for kids. Thermal wear is another major category that Rupa caters to: It offers winter wear for both men and women.

== See also ==
- Lux Industries
