= Volini =

Brand of pain relief medical spray and cream

- Logo of Volini (top) and Volini Maxx (bottom)
- Product type: Medicine
- Current owner: Sun Pharma
- Produced by: Sun Pharma
- Country: India
- Related brands: Volini Maxx
- Ambassador: Virat Kohli
- Tagline: with 360 degree technology
- Website: www.volini.com

Volini is a brand of pain relief medical spray and cream manufactured, marketed and sold by Sun Pharma in India. The product was created by Ranbaxy Laboratories, but has been owned by Sun Pharma ever since Ranbaxy was acquired by the latter in 2014. The product's variant named Volini Maxx, was released on 29 August 2018.

Virat Kohli is the present brand ambassador of the product.
