= The Bhawanipur Gujarati Education Society School =

Coordinates: 22°32′10.76″N 88°20′52.39″E

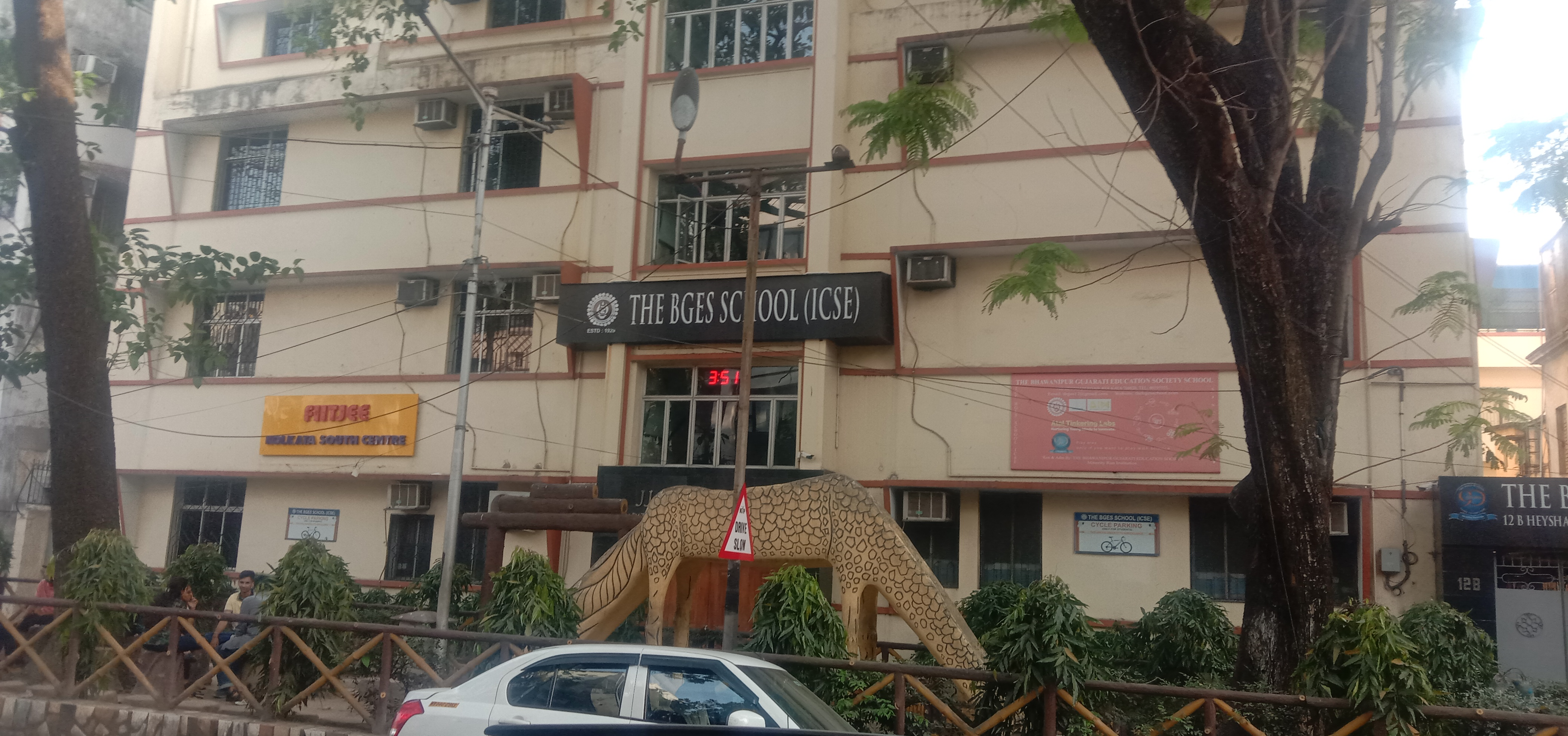

The Bhawanipur Gujarati Education Society School (BES School), also popularly known by its old name, J. J. Ajmera High School, is a private, co-educational, K-12, school of Kolkata. The school is located in the Bhawanipur area of Kolkata.

== History ==
The J. J. Ajmera High School or the Bhawanipur Gujarati Education Society School was founded in 1928. The Secondary School was founded in 1958 while the Higher Secondary School was founded in 1960. Later, the BES College was founded in 1966 by the Gujarati Society, Calcutta, which grew out of this school.

Both the school and college were started by a privately owned trust started by a Gujarati businessman living in Kolkata and even the land on which the school and college stands was donated by a few generous Gujarati businessman. The fund for construction of school building was donated by a gentleman after whom the school was named, J. J. Ajmera High School. The original purpose of the founders was to give their wards an education in Gujarati, so that they learn writing and speaking in their mother tongue and till almost a decade ago, the admission to school was restricted to only Gujarati speaking people, as per original rules of the trust. Since the beginning of the school in 1928 till 2001, the medium of study till class V was totally in Gujarati and from VI onwards in English and the second language was Gujarati. Bengali was taught as a subject only for two years Class V and VI. The school was at that time affiliated to WB Board till the year 2001 and students had to appear for Madhyamik examinations for passing out.

== Present day ==
However, since, 2002, the school is now open to the entire community and the medium of teaching is English; the second language offered has been changed to Hindi or Bengali. The teaching of the Gujarati language has been completely stopped. The School is a part of Bhawanipur Gujarati Education Society, which also operates one of the most popular colleges in Kolkata. The school is now affiliated to the ICSE Board, New Delhi and offers education right from primary to higher secondary, after which their students can select the stream for further studies in arts, science, commerce or fashion, which are offered by the Bhawanipur Education Society College, run by the same trust. The school also has a Computer training Centre, which is a joint venture with Aptech.

== Notable alumni ==
- Dilip Doshi - noted spin bowler
- Dilip Sanghvi - founder Sun Pharma, one of the richest men in India.

== See also ==
- List of schools in Kolkata
