= Peary Mohan Chatterjee =

Indian educationist

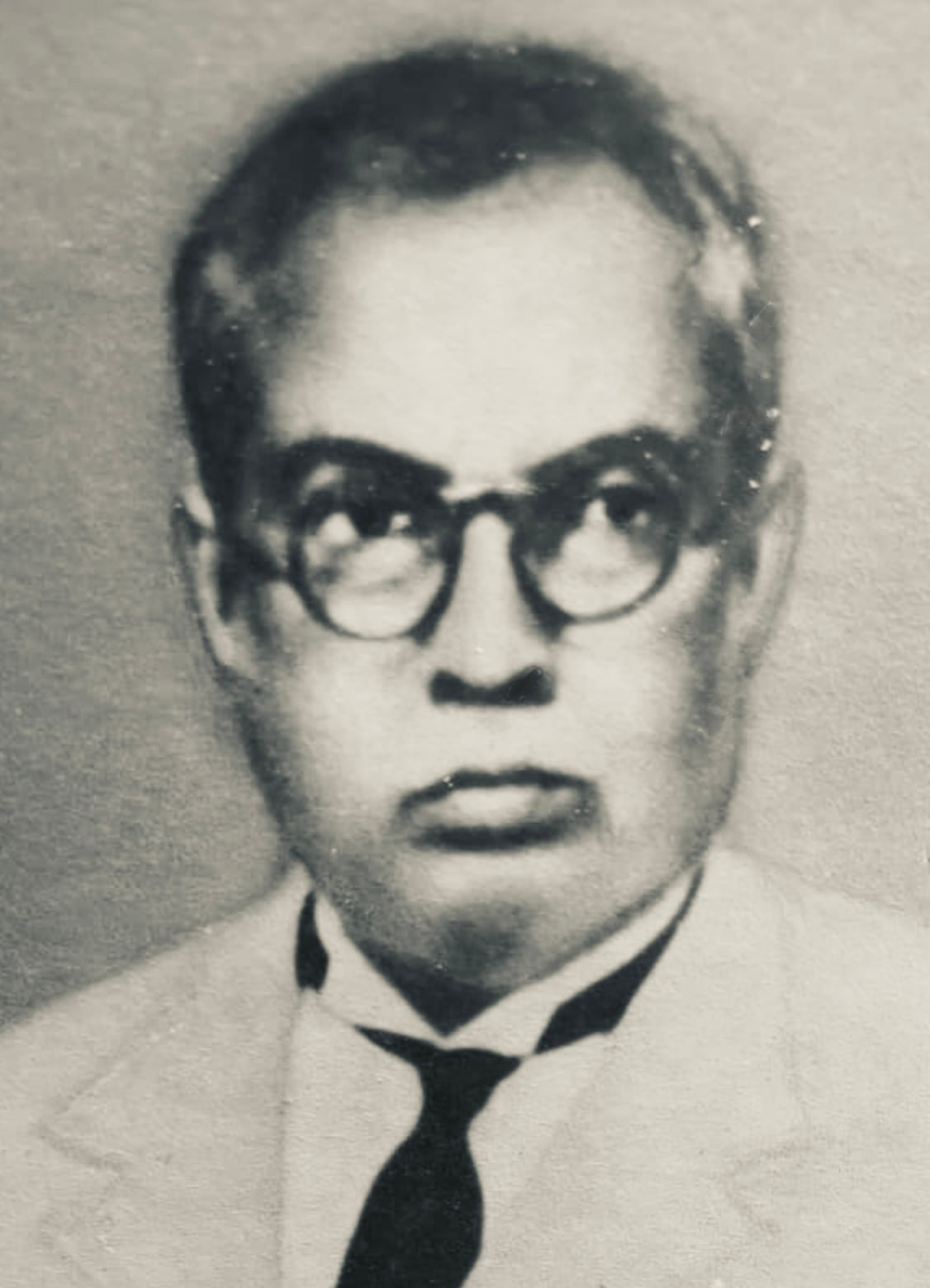
- Peary Mohan Chatterjee, 1932
- Born: 1 August 1883; Khulna, Bengal, British India
- Died: 24 December 1951 (aged 68); Bhowanipore, Calcutta
- Education: University of Calcutta
- Occupations: Educationist, Lawyer, Social Reformer
- Notable work: Founder, Beltala Girls' High School and South Calcutta Girls' College

Peary Mohan Chatterjee (1 August 1883 – 24 December 1951), was an Indian educationist and lawyer during the British colonial rule in India. He was the founder of Beltala Girls' High School and South Calcutta Girls' College.

== Early life and education ==
Peary Mohan Chatterjee was born in 1883 into a Bengali Hindu Brahmin family. His father, Krishna Mohan Chatterjee, was a lawyer. Chatterjee pursued a legal career, following in his father's footsteps. He studied at the University of Calcutta, where he earned a Bachelor of Laws and a Master of Arts degree.

He married Vidyutbala Devi in 1908.

== Notable Work ==
Peary Mohan Chatterjee was a prominent figure in early 20th-century colonial Bengal who championed girls' education. On July 2, 1920, he founded a girls' school at his South Calcutta residence from his library with only six girls, including his daughters Kanaklata Devi and Kamala Devi. In the face of considerable societal resistance and financial shortfalls, Chatterjee resolutely mortgaged his home to secure the necessary funds for the school's construction. The school was called Beltala Girls' High School, that proudly symbolized inclusivity by welcoming girls from diverse socio-economic backgrounds.

In 1922, Chatterjee, with the help of Chittaranjan Das and other lawyers, established the Beltala Girls Education Society. Das chaired the society, and Chatterjee served as the secretary..The society aimed to expand educational opportunities for women coming from middle-income families. This powerful initiative led to the establishment of South Calcutta Girls College, initially operating as a morning section of Beltala Girls' School before becoming an independent institution in 1932 and the first girls' college in South Kolkata.

Chatterjee believed in the intellectual freedom of women, and helped set up the library at South Calcutta Girls' College with the assistance of the founding members. The library, which started with 7,000 books, became a vital resource for young women, helping their educational and intellectual growth. Today, the college's library is named in honor of Peary Mohan Chatterjee, commemorating his enduring legacy in advancing women's education.
