= Jogesh Chandra Chaudhuri Law College =

Law college in Kolkata, India

- Type: Public
- Established: 25 January 1970; 56 years ago
- Founder: Ranadeb Chaudhuri
- Affiliations: University of Calcutta
- President: Jashadeb Chaudhuri
- Principal: Dr. Sunanda Goenka
- Location: 30, Prince Anwar Shah Rd, Badam Talla, Tollygunge, Kolkata, West Bengal 700033, India; 22°30′04.96″N 88°20′53.14″E
- Campus: Urban
- Website: www.jcclcsu.org www.jcclawcollege.in
- Location in Kolkata Jogesh Chandra Chaudhuri Law College (India)

The Jogesh Chandra Chaudhuri Law College (abbreviated as JCCLC) is a Government Sponsored Law College in south Kolkata offering degree courses in law. It is affiliated with the University of Calcutta.

== Notable alumni ==
- Mamata Banerjee, 8th Chief Minister of West Bengal
- Saugata Roy, Indian politician

== See also ==
- Jogesh Chandra Chaudhuri College
- List of colleges affiliated to the University of Calcutta
