= Taro Pharmaceuticals =

Generic pharmaceutical company

Taro Pharmaceutical Industries Ltd.
- Traded as: NYSE: TARO
- Industry: Pharmaceuticals
- Founded: 1950 in Haifa, Israel
- Headquarters: Haifa, Israel
- Key people: Uday Vijaykumar Baldota, CEO
- Revenue: US$ 862.94 million (2015)
- Operating income: US$ 527.63 million (2015)
- Net income: US$ 484.26 million (2015)
- Total assets: US$ 1,737.74 million (2015)
- Total equity: US$ 1,411.72 million (2015)
- Owner: Sun Pharma
- Number of employees: 1,339 (2015)
- Website: www.taro.com

Taro Pharmaceutical Industries is an Israeli research-based pharmaceutical manufacturer that was publicly listed in the New York Stock Exchange before it was acquired by Sun Pharma. The company has more than 180 of its own drugs sold all over the world, reaching the markets of over 25 countries. The company's products are mainly sold in the United States, Canada and Israel.

== Operations ==
The company's operations are managed in three sub-companies, including Taro Pharmaceutical Industries Ltd., Taro Pharmaceuticals Inc. and Taro U.S.A. The latter two are its subsidiaries.

== History ==
Taro (the name of the company was derived from the Hebrew words for "pharmaceutical industry") was founded in 1950 by a team of pharmacists and physicians in Haifa, Israel. In 1952 it was acquired by United States-based investors and began production and marketing Rokal and Rokacet pain relievers.

In 1957, Taro acquired licenses to produce third-party products for the Israeli market and launched production of its first three licensed products, Coumadin (also known under its generic name Warfarin), Percodan, and Percocet.

In 1960, Taro begins production of active pharmaceutical ingredients (APIs).

Taro had an initial public offering in 1961, listing its stock on the over-the-counter market in the United States. At the beginning of the 1980s Taro became interested in moving into the North American market, following the impending opening of the U.S. generics market through the Hatch-Waxman Act, that was passed in 1984 and provided a framework for the production and marketing of off-patent drugs in the United States. In preparation for this opening, Taro shifted its listing to the NASDAQ stock index in 1982.

In 1984, Taro acquired Canada-based K-Line Pharmaceuticals. K-Line specialized in generic topical medications for dermatological applications. This niche market then became Taro's primary focus in the North American market.

In 2006, Taro was delisted from NASDAQ, after it had to restate financial results downwards for the years 2004, 2005 and 2006

=== Acquisition by Sun Pharmaceuticals ===
In 2010, Sun Pharmaceuticals of India acquired a majority stake in the company. On 22 March 2012, the company's shares were re-listed on the NYSE.

In 2013, Sun Pharmaceuticals attempted to buy the remaining shares in the company (it owns 69% stake), but as the company's financial performance improved, shareholders rejected the offer and the company remained publicly listed.

On 17 January 2024, Taro Pharmaceutical Industries Ltd. announced a merger agreement with Sun Pharmaceutical, wherein Sun Pharma will acquire all outstanding Taro shares not already held by Sun Pharma or its affiliates for $43.00 per share. The acquisition was completed in June 2024.

=== FDA warnings ===
In February 2009, the US Food and Drug Administration (FDA) released a warning letter to Taro Pharmaceuticals pointing out some issues relating to the company's manufacturing facility in Brampton, Ontario, Canada. The manufacture of non-sterile cream and ointment finished products were inspected to be adulterated and did not conform to good manufacturing practices.

In February 2011, Taro Pharmaceuticals resolved the warning letters after a re-inspection from FDA which showed an acceptable regulatory status.

On January 10, 2020, The US Food and Drug Administration (FDA) announced a voluntary recall of 100 mg Lamotrigine (Generic for Lamictal) tablets manufactured by Taro Pharmaceuticals USA due to cross-contamination with Enalapril Maleate at a Taro Pharmaceuticals manufacturing facility.
