= Bhowanipore =

- Neighbourhood in Kolkata (Calcutta)
- Location in Kolkata
- Coordinates: 22.534°N 88.346°E
- Country: India
- State: West Bengal
- City: Kolkata
- District: Kolkata
- Metro Station: Rabindra Sadan, Netaji Bhavan and Jatin Das Park
- Municipal Corporation: Kolkata Municipal Corporation
- KMC wards: 70, 71, 72, 73
- Elevation: 36 ft (11 m)

Population
  - Total: For population see linked KMC ward pages
- Time zone: UTC+5:30 (IST)
- PIN: 700 020
- Area code: +91 33
- Lok Sabha constituency: Kolkata Dakshin
- Vidhan Sabha constituency: Bhabanipur

Bhowanipore (also Bhowanipur; Bengali: ভবানীপুর; Hindi: भवानीपुर) is a neighbourhood of South Kolkata in Kolkata district in the Indian state of West Bengal.

== History ==
In 1717, the East India Company obtained the right to rent from 38 villages surrounding their settlement from the Mughal emperor Farrukhsiyar. Of these, 5 lay across the Hooghly in what is now Howrah district. The remaining 33 villages were on the Calcutta side. After the fall of Siraj-ud-daulah, the last independent Nawab of Bengal, it purchased these villages in 1758 from Mir Jafar, and reorganised them. These villages were known en-bloc as Dihi Panchannagram and Bhowanipore was one of them. It was considered to be a suburb beyond the limits of the Maratha Ditch.

Bhowanipore existed as a dihi in 1765 and also absorbed a part of Dihi Chakraberia. The construction of Harish Mukherjee Road and Lansdowne Road (now Sarat Bose Road) and the extension of Hazra Road to Kalighat, opened up the area at the beginning of the 20th century. Artisans played a role in developing the neighbourhood and making it a populous native place. The kansaris (braziers), the shankharis (conch workers) and the telis (oil pressers); all had their paras. The goods were sold in pattis. Along with these artisans, Indian lawyers flocked to Bhowanipore, as the Sadr Diwani Adalat, the highest appellate court in those days, had shifted to the old Military Hospital Building here, and the District Judge's court was in Alipore.

In 1888, one of the 25 newly organized police section houses was located in Bhowanipore.

When the Bengal Renaissance started taking roots in 19th century Calcutta, it was initially limited to the predominantly Hindu 'Indian town' stretching north and north-east from the fringes of Burrabazar, with a somewhat later extension to south and south-east of the 'European town' to Bhowanipore, and some decades later to Ballygunge, which was then developing as a suburb.

In the first half of the 20th century, “in the milieu of relative urban prosperity... Calcutta’s rich citizens – those connected with jute, coal, tea, other industries, trade, money-lending and rentier income from urban property – did fabulously well for themselves.” Many of the mansions in Ballygunge, Bhowanipore and Alipore were built by the city's Bengali and the new Marwari elite who wanted to move from the “dirtier sections of north Calcutta to the more fashionable areas in the south”.

Again, it was in the first half of the 20th century that with the implementation of the Area Improvement Programme of Calcutta Improvement Trust Bhowanipore, an old residential suburb was upgraded to modern standards of town planning.

== Notable residents ==
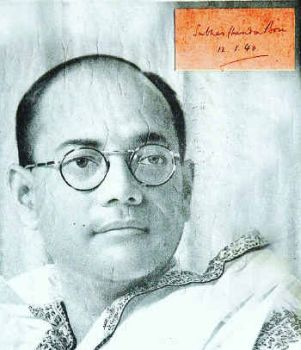
Netaji Subhas Chandra Bose was from Bhowanipore

- Mamata Banerjee - Former Chief Minister of West Bengal
- Bijon Bhattacharya, eminent theatre artist, director and famous Bengali play writer, also the husband of eminent international award-winning social worker and writer Smt.Mahasweta Devi.
- Subhas Chandra Bose, one of the frontline Freedom Fighters of British India, founder of the Forward Bloc and the Indian National Army
- Peary Mohan Chatterjee, educationist, lawyer and social reformer
- Deshbandhu Chittaranjan Das, renowned barrister and president of Swaraj Party
- Brajendranath De, early Indian member of the Indian Civil Service
- Tarun Kumar, actor
- Guru Dutt, renowned Indian film director, producer, actor, choreographer, and writer
- Anil Kumar Gain, statistician, Fellow of the Royal Statistical Society
- Alphonse François Lacroix, missionary and translator
- Ranjit Mallick, Bengali film actor
- Munna Mitra, first-class cricketer and Anglican clergyman
- Premendra Mitra, Author and Poet
- Ashutosh Mukherjee, vice-chancellor of the University of Calcutta
- Hemant Kumar Mukherjee, famous singer, composer, director and producer, lived near Kansari Para in his youth and attended Mitra Institution school of Bhowanipore area.
- Shyama Prasad Mukherjee, founder of Jan Sangh and first union industry minister of India
- Hana Catherine Mullens (1826–1861), European missionary, educator, translator and writer, notable for zenana missions
- Jaimin Rajani, singer-songwriter
- Satyajit Ray, world-renowned film-maker, composer and author
- Siddhartha Shankar Ray, former Chief Minister of West Bengal, Barrister
- Uttam Kumar, actor, composer and director

== Geography ==
=== Location ===
It is located south of the Lower Circular Road (now A.J.C. Bose Road). It is bounded by Lansdown Road (presently Sarat Bose Road) to the east, Hazra Road to the south and Tolly Nullah to the west. It consists of well-known and posh localities like Elgin Road, Gokhale Road, Woodburn Park, Bakulbagan Road, Harish Mukherjee Road, Townshend Road and parts of Chakraberia and Lansdowne.

=== Police district ===
Bhowanipur police station is part of the South division of Kolkata Police.

Tollygunge Women's police station has jurisdiction over all the police districts in the South Division, i.e. Park Street, Shakespeare Sarani, Alipore, Hastings, Maidan, Bhowanipore, Kalighat, Tollygunge, Charu Market, New Alipur and Chetla.

=== Places of interest ===
- Netaji Bhawan
- Bhowanipore Cemetery
- Nandan, West Bengal Film Centre
- Academy of Fine Arts, Kolkata
- Jain Temple
- Shree Swaminarayan Mandir
- Shree Laxminarayan Mandir
- Forum Courtyard Mall
- Sikh Gurudwara
- Nehru Museum

== Demographics ==
Business opportunities brought many Gujaratis to Calcutta about a century back and they opted to stay in the Lansdowne-Chakraberia-Puddapukur belt of Bhowanipore. The railways, the jute mills and the shipping industry brought in many Punjabis to Calcutta. The Harish Mukherjee Road area of Bhowanipore and Dunlop (in north Kolkata) were the biggest pockets of Punjabi settlement. With declining economic opportunities many of both the communities are leaving Kolkata. Writing about the Bhabanipur (Vidhan Sabha constituency), from where the West Bengal chief minister, Mamata Banerjee, contests, Hindustan Times said, "The constituency has a sizable population of Sikhs and Gujaratis. However, it is dominated by middle-class Bengalis."

For language and religion census data, available at the district level, see Kolkata district.

== Culture ==
Bhowanipore was also known as the Cinema Para, or the locality of the city which boasted of a string of cinema halls. The stretch started with Purna near Jadu Babu's Bazaar and was followed up by Bharati, Indira, Bijoli, Basusree, Kalika, and Ujjwala, right up to the recesses of the Kalighat Temple. They were primarily famous for their screenings of Bengali, English and Hindi movies. However, due to the lack of patronage and drying up of the Bengali film box office in the mid-90s, and the first decade of the 2000s, most of these halls have been closed down. Basusree, Indira and Bijoli are still operational, though the condition is not that well of, Bharati, Kalika, and Ujjwala have been demolished to make way for multi-storied buildings that host malls, educational institutes, and marriage halls. Purna has been closed down for more than a decade now, and there is little hope that it will be opened again.

The area also has the 23 Palli Durga Mandir, a small Temple which houses an Ashta Dhaatu Murti of Durga, and near the well known Kalighat Kali Temple, and the Nakuleshwar Bhairav Temple, considered one of the holiest of the holies in Hindu religion.

== Healthcare ==
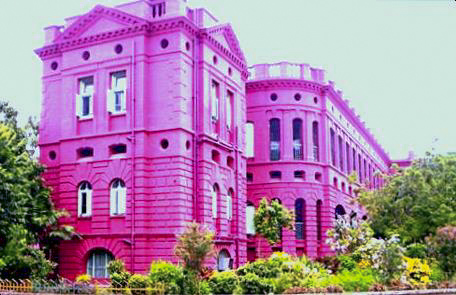
SSKM Hospital

- Chittaranjan National Cancer Institute
- SSKM Hospital
- Sambhunath Pandit Hospital
- Health Point Hospital
- Ramrikdas Haralalka Hospital
- Anandalok Hospital
- Fortis Medical Centre, Kolkata
- Bangur Institute of Neurosciences

== Education ==
- Asutosh College, S. P. Mukherjee Road
- Mitra Institution, Bhowanipore Branch
- South Suburban School (Main)
- Sir Ramesh Mitra Girls High School
- Chakraberia High School
- Adarsh Hindi High School
- Gokhale Memorial Girls' College
- St.Helen School
- Bhowanipore Girls High School
- Vidyanjali International School
- Khalsa High School
- Hartley High School, Sarat Bose Road
- Acharya Jagadish Chandra Bose College, Elgin Road
- Bhawanipur Education Society College, Elgin Road
- Bhawanipur Gujarati Balmandir
- J. J. Ajmera High School, Heysham Road
- Julien Day School, Elgin Road and Ramesh Mitra Road.
- St. John's Diocesan Girls' Higher Secondary School
- Cathedral Mission High School, Elgin Road
- South Calcutta Girls' College
- IPGME&R and SSKM Hospital, Acharya Jagadish Chandra Bose Road
- United Missionary Girls' High School

== Sports ==
A club named Bhawanipore FC, founded by Nani Mitra in 1910, stands at the entrance of the Maidan near the Rani Rashmani Statue and presently managed by the Sangbad Pratidin group, represents Bhawanipore in both the domestic and regional tournaments. The club is two time runners-up in the I-League 2nd Division in 2014–15 and 2019–20.. They have won Three Cooch Behar Cups (1923, 1927, 1929), One Ogilvie Cup (1944), One Bordoloi Trophy (2013) and One Naihati Gold Cup (2022). They have also come second in one IFA Shield(1948), Four Calcutta Football League (1952, 2016-17, 2017-18, 2022) Currently Bhawanipore FC plays in Calcutta Football League Premier Division.

Separately the field hockey team of Bhawanipore Club won the Calcutta Hockey League twice (1953 and successfully defended the title in 1954)
