= Munna Mitra =

English cricketer and clergyman

Personal information
- Full name: Avijit Mitra
- Born: 6 July 1953 (age 73); Bhowanipore, West Bengal, India
- Batting: Right-handed
- Bowling: Right-arm off break

Domestic team information
- Years: Team
- 1974–1975: Oxford University

Career statistics
Competition	First-class
Matches	6
Runs scored	157
Batting average	13.08
100s/50s	–/–
Top score	30
Catches/stumpings	2/–
- Source: ESPNcricinfo, 15 June 2020

Avijit 'Munna' Mitra (born 6 July 1953) is an Indian-born English clergyman, educator and former first-class cricketer.

Mitra was born in West Bengal at Bhowanipore in July 1953. Moving to England as a child, he was educated in Birmingham at King Edward's School, before going up to Keble College, Oxford. While studying at Oxford, he played first-class cricket for Oxford University in 1974 and 1975, making six appearances. He scored 157 runs in his six matches, at an average of 13.08 and a high score of 30.

After graduating from Oxford, Mitra became a schoolmaster at King Edward's School, Birmingham. He left in July 1981 to teach at Highgate School. Mitra also took holy orders in the Church of England, featuring regularly in the Church Times Cricket Cup. From 1988 to 1996, he taught classics at Abingdon School, where he was also a housemaster and a cricket coach, before moving to the Bluecoat School. He was head of boarding at King's School, Rochester before becoming associate priest at Hempstead. Mitra still teaches part-time at Rochester Grammar School for Girls, in addition to being a priest-vicar at Rochester Cathedral.
