= Bengal Music College =

Music training college in Kolkata, India

- Type: Music college
- Established: 1940; 86 years ago
- Affiliations: University of Calcutta (since 1956)
- President: Sovandeb Chattopadhyay
- Principal: Manasi Majumder (Teacher-in-charge)
- Location: D/1, C.I.T.Sken-72, Gariahat Rd, Dhakuria, South End Park, Kolkata, West Bengal, 700029, India; 22.5111359°N 88.3666656°E
- Campus: Urban
- Website: Bengal Music College
- Location in Kolkata Bengal Music College (India)

The Bengal Music College (BMC) is a music training college in Kolkata, India, established in 1940 by Nanigopal Bandhopadhyay, the college has been affiliated with the University of Calcutta since 1956. It offers intermediate, undergraduate (honours and general), and postgraduate degrees in Indian classical music.

The college started a Master of Music course in 2003, and in 2009 it also started a Ph.D. program, affiliated with the University of Calcutta.

== Courses ==
- Hindusthani Classical Music
- Rabindra Sangeet
- Bengali Songs

=== Post graduate ===
- Hindusthani Classical Music
- Rabindra Sangeet
- Bengali Songs

== See also ==
- List of colleges affiliated to the University of Calcutta
- Education in India
- Education in West Bengal
