= Beltala Girls' High School =

Coordinates: 22.5257°N 88.3511°E

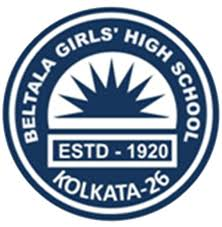

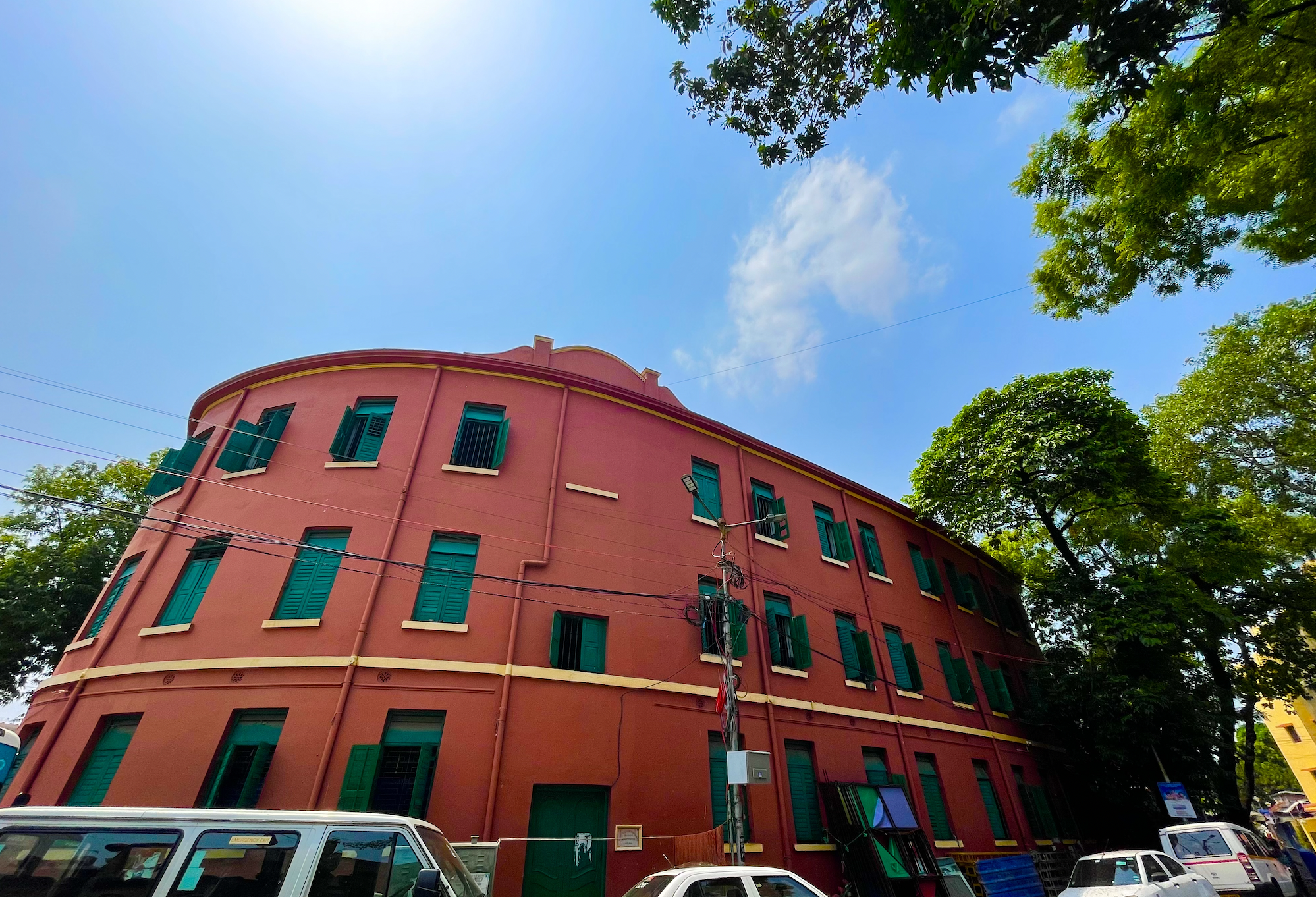
- Beltala Girls' High School

Location
- 17, Beltala Rd, Bakul Bagan; Kolkata, West Bengal 700026; India

Information
- School type: Government school
- Established: 2nd July, 1920
- Founder: Peary Mohan Chatterjee
- School board: WBBSE & WBCHSE
- Authority: Government of West Bengal
- Headmistress: Ajanta Mukhopadhyay
- Gender: Girls
- Language: Bengali and English
- Campus: Urban
- Affiliation: West Bengal Board of Secondary Education and West Bengal Council of Higher Secondary Education

Beltala Girls' High School is a school in Hazra, Kolkata, India. It is a girls' school and is affiliated with the West Bengal Board of Secondary Education for Madhyamik Pariksha (10th Board exams), and to the West Bengal Council of Higher Secondary Education for Higher Secondary Examination (12th Board exams). The school was established in 1920 by Peary Mohan Chatterjee, an Indian educationist and lawyer, at his Bhowanipur residence, initially with only six girls.

== See also ==
- List of schools in Kolkata
