= State Institute of Physical Education For Women =

- Type: Undergraduate college
- Established: 1975; 51 years ago
- Affiliations: University of Calcutta
- Location: 5B, Judges Ct Rd, Alipore, Kolkata, West Bengal, 700027, India; 22.5223845°N 88.3346°E
- Campus: Urban
- Website: http://www.sipew.org/
- Location in Kolkata State Institute of Physical Education For Women (India)

State Institute of Physical Education For Women, established in 1975, is an undergraduate women's college for physical education in Kolkata, West Bengal, India. This college is affiliated to the University of Calcutta. This college offers B.P. Ed and M.P.Ed degree.

== See also ==
- List of colleges affiliated to the University of Calcutta
- Education in India
- Education in West Bengal
