= South Calcutta Girls' College =

- Type: Undergraduate college
- Established: 1932; 94 years ago
- Affiliations: University of Calcutta
- Location: 72, Sarat Bose Rd, Lansdown, Garcha, Ballygunge, Kolkata, West Bengal, 700025, India; 22.529030555°N 88.35298333°E
- Campus: Urban
- Website: South Calcutta Girls' College

- Location within Kolkata Location within India

South Calcutta Girls College is an undergraduate women's college in Kolkata, India. It is affiliated to the University of Calcutta. It is the first girls' college in South Kolkata and the third oldest in West Bengal.

== Courses offered ==
The college offers B.A. (Hons.) in Bengali, Education, English, History, Journalism and Mass Communication, Philosophy, Political Science, Sanskrit and Sociology. It also offers B.Sc. (Hons.) in Botany, Economics, Geography, Zoology and Psychology with B.Sc. General subjects such as Mathematics, Chemistry and Statistics.

== Facilities ==
The college has a central library, PEARY MOHAN CHATTERJEE LIBRARY with over 23,000 books for all subjects. The college also owns a canteen which supplies healthy food at a low price. The college has its own hostel facility which accommodates about 50 students every term. The college has its own Gymnasium for the students. The college also has large laboratories for students taking up Geography, Journalism, Chemistry, Botany, Zoology and Psychology. The college takes up interested students for NSS.

== History ==
The college was established by a group of lawyers led by the notable lawyer and educator, Peary Mohan Chatterjee. Founded in 1932 as an independent institution, it originated in 1922 as part of the Beltala Girls Education Society, as a morning section of Beltala School. The society was chaired by freedom fighter Deshbandhu Chitta Ranjan Das, while Chatterjee served as the secretary. The college was established with the objective of providing higher education to girls from middle-income families, distinguishing itself as the first institution in South Kolkata to offer advanced studies exclusively for women and the third oldest girls' college in West Bengal.

In 1956, South Calcutta Girls' College was granted affiliation by the University of Calcutta. Since then, the college has grown and expanded, offering undergraduate and postgraduate courses in a variety of disciplines such as arts, science, and commerce.

== Notable alumni ==
- Pratima Barua Pandey

== Notable faculty ==
- Chittaranjan Das

== See also ==
- List of colleges affiliated to the University of Calcutta
- Education in India
- Education in West Bengal
