= Dinabandhu Institution =

Institute in Howrah, India

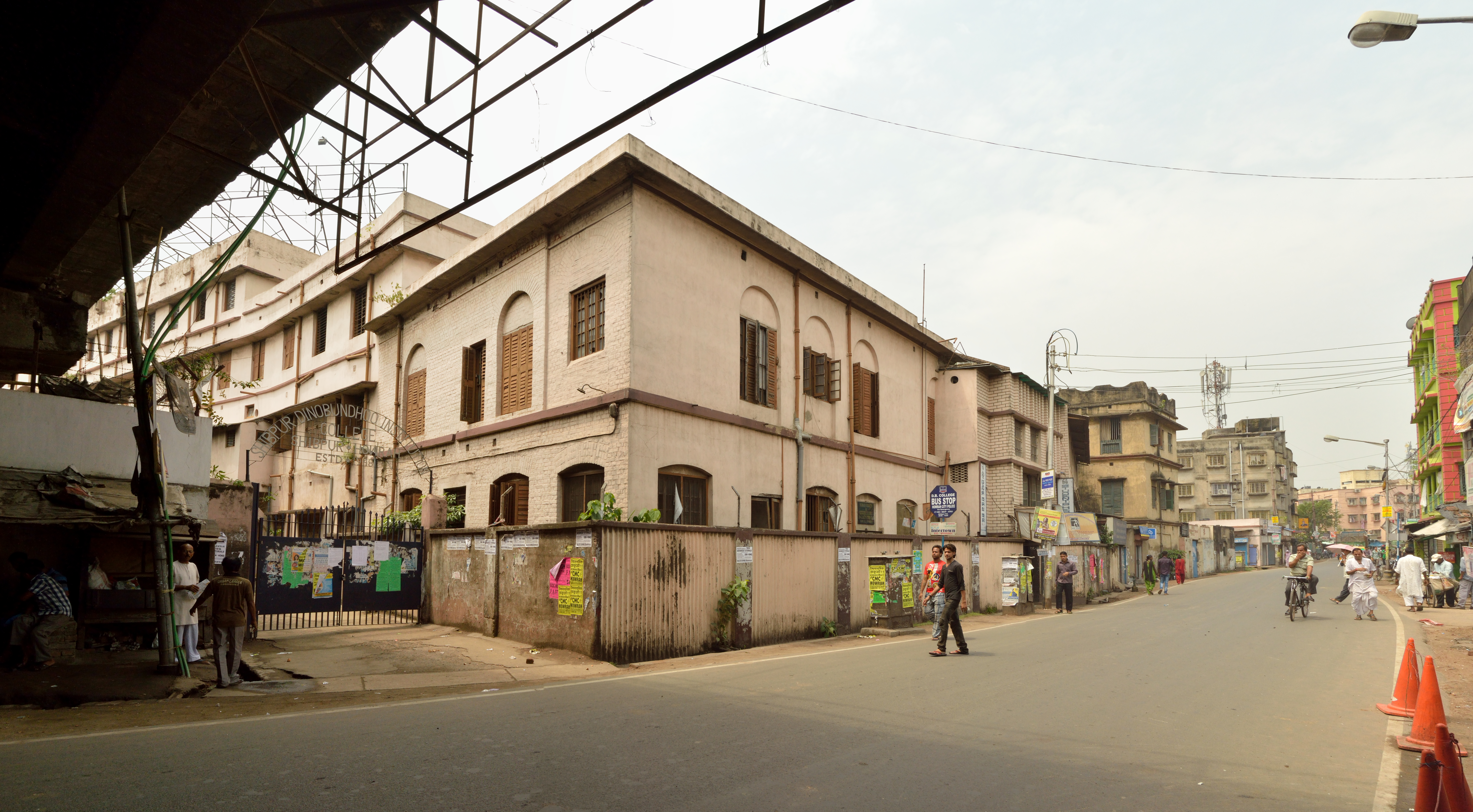
- Type: Undergraduate college
- Established: 1948; 78 years ago
- Affiliations: University of Calcutta
- President: Sri Braja Mohan Majumder
- Principal: Dr.Manideep Chandra
- Location: 412, 1, Grand Trunk Road, South, Shibpur, Howrah, West Bengal, 711102, India; 22.5624195°N 88.3188142°E
- Campus: Urban
- Website: https://sdbic.ac.in/
- Location in West Bengal Dinabandhu Institution (India)

Dinabandhu Institution, also known as Shibpur Dinobundhoo Institution, established in 1948, is a research based undergraduate college in Howrah, India. It is affiliated to University of Calcutta.

== Departments and courses ==
The college offers different undergraduate and postgraduate courses and aims at imparting education to the undergraduates of lower- and middle-class people of Howrah and its adjoining areas.

=== Science ===
Science faculty consists of the departments of Chemistry, Physics, Mathematics, Computer Science & Application, Botany, Zoology, and Economics.

=== Arts & Commerce ===
Arts and Commerce faculty consists of departments of Bengali, English, Sanskrit, Urdu, History, Political Science, Philosophy, Sociology, and Commerce.

== Accreditation ==
Recently, Dinabandhu Institution has been awarded B+ grade by the National Assessment and Accreditation Council (NAAC). The college is also recognized by the University Grants Commission (UGC).

== See also ==
- List of colleges affiliated to the University of Calcutta
- Education in India
- Education in West Bengal
