= Ashok Todi =

Indian industrialist (born 1958)

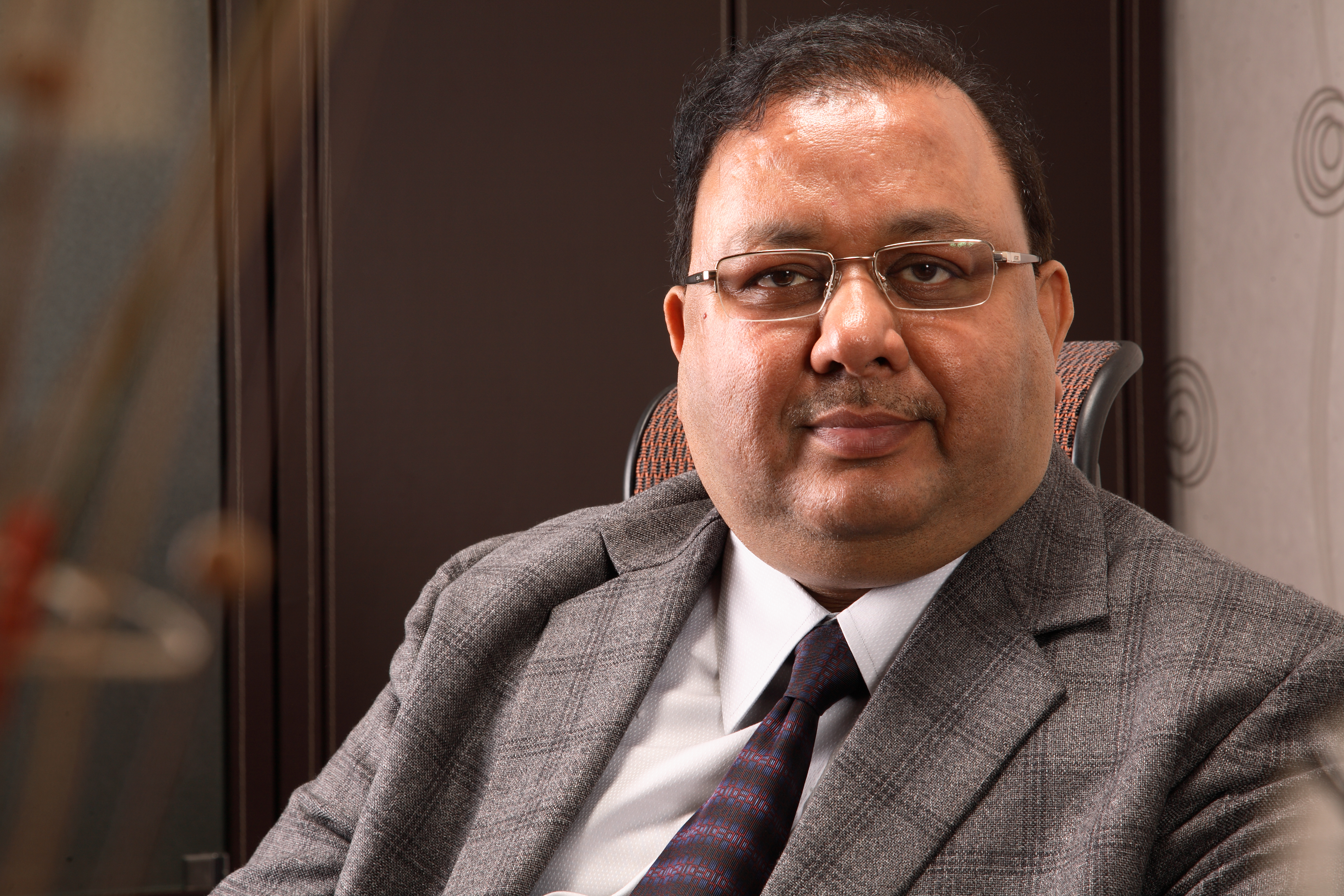
- Todi in 2013

Personal details
- Born: 17 September 1958 (age 68)
- Parent: Giridhari Lal Todi (father)
- Education: Bhawanipur College
- Occupation: Industrialist (Lux Industries)

Ashok Todi (born 1958) is an Indian industrialist, heading the Kolkata-based Lux Industries group, an innerwear garment manufacturer.

== Career ==
Ashok Todi was born into a Hindu Marwadi business family, the son of industrialist Giridhari Lal Todi.

=== Lux Industries Limited ===
Lux Industries Limited is an innerwear company of India with three brands in its portfolio - Lux Innerwear, GenX Style Inners, and ONN Premium Inners. Lux Cozi is the main brand of Lux Industries Limited. The company launched a consumer coupon scheme in 1992 called "Mazedar Mauka". From 1 product, the company's product range has expanded to more than 150 products today. Ashok is:

- The Chairman of Lux Industries Limited;
- Director of Biswanath Hosiery Mills Limited; and,
- Director of Todi Hosiery Limited

Todi took over as the chairman of the company on 1 October 2007. By a quirk of fate, this was exactly the time when he became embroiled in a murder case.

== Controversy ==
In September 2007, Todi became embroiled in a controversy regarding the death of Rizwanur Rahman, who was allegedly in a relationship with Todi's daughter, and by some accounts is said to have been secretly married to her. The case remains under investigation as of 2021.
