= Prahlad Rai Agarwala =

Indian businessman

- Born: May 11, 1938 (age 87); Shekhawati, India
- Education: University of Calcutta
- Occupation: Businessman
- Organization(s): Rupa & Company
- Known for: Manufacturing and export of a range of clothing and other products
- Spouse: Shanti Devi Agarwal
- Children: 2 (Ramesh Agarwal, Suresh Agarwal)
- Awards: Padma Shri in 2022
- Website: rupa.co.in

Prahlad Rai Agarwala is an Indian businessman based in Kolkata, West Bengal, engaged in the manufacturing and export of a range of clothing and other products including inner wear, casual wear, kids wear, winter wear and footwear.

== Early life and education ==
Agarwala was born in 1938 and the obtained a bachelor's degree in law from University of Calcutta.

== Career ==
Agarwala founded the "Rupa" brand of knit wear owned by the hosiery company Rupa Company along with Ghanshyam Prasad Agarwala and Kunj Bihari Agarwal in 1968. It became one of India's largest knitwear brands.

In 1962, Prahlad Rai Agarwala sett up Binod Hosiery, however it proved to be unsuccessful.

== Recognition ==
In the year 2022, Govt of India conferred the Padma Shri award, the third highest award in the Padma series of awards, on Agarwala for his distinguished service in the field of trade and industry. The award is in recognition of his service as a "textile business leader, flag bearer of Make in India running Rupa & Co, one of India's largest clothing manufacturer and exporter".

He is also the Honorary Consul of Republic of Columbia. In 2011, Agarwala was awarded the lifetime achievement award in the 7th Reid & Taylor awards for retail excellence organized by the Asia Retail Congress.
