= Vivekananda College, Thakurpukur =

Public college in Calcutta, India

Vivekananda College
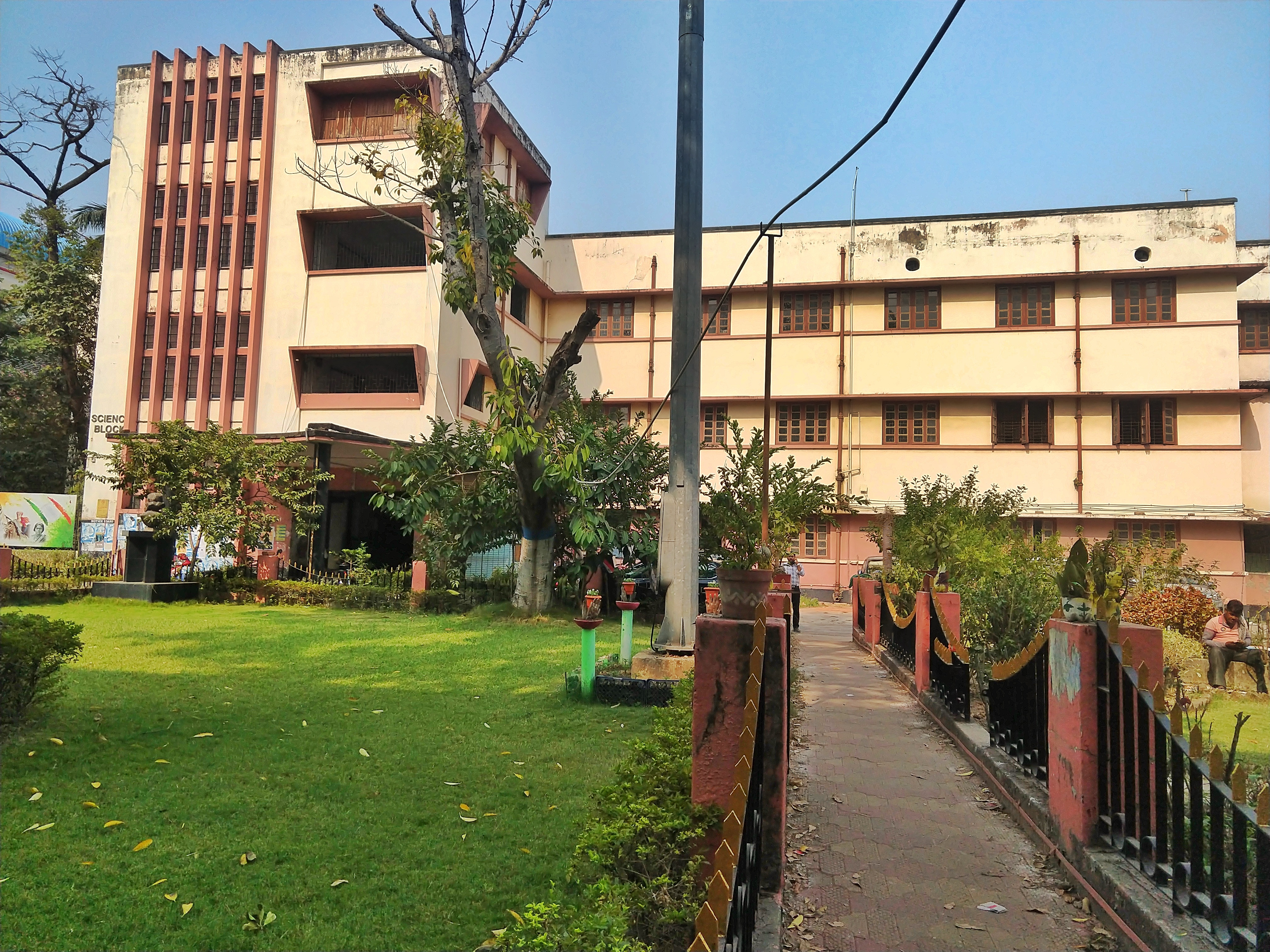
- UG Science Block of Vivekananda College
- Former name: Barisha College
- Motto in English: From darkness, lead us to the light
- Type: Public
- Established: 21 August 1950; 76 years ago
- Accreditation: NAAC "A+"
- Affiliations: University of Calcutta; UGC
- President: Smt. Ratna Chateerjee
- Principal: Prof. Nabakishore Chanda
- Students: 4,423
- Location: 269, Diamond Harbour Road, Thakurpukur, Kolkata, West Bengal 700063, India; 22°27′51.941″N 88°18′28.55″E
- Campus: Urban (6.17 acres)
- Website: vivekanandacollegekolkata.ac.in//

- Location within Kolkata Location within India

Vivekananda College is a state government-aided public college, affiliated to the University of Calcutta, located in southwest Kolkata, close to the Thakurpukur metro station. The college offers both post-graduate and under-graduate courses in a number of subjects of science, arts and commerce. Founded in 1950 as Barisha College, it was established under the dispersal scheme of the state government to reduce the pressure of students from the then East Pakistan, now Bangladesh.

In 2013-14, it was ranked 1 in the ranking of India Today's Nielsen survey as the best science college in Kolkata. The college is affiliated to Calcutta University, under UGC and accredited by NAAC.

== History ==
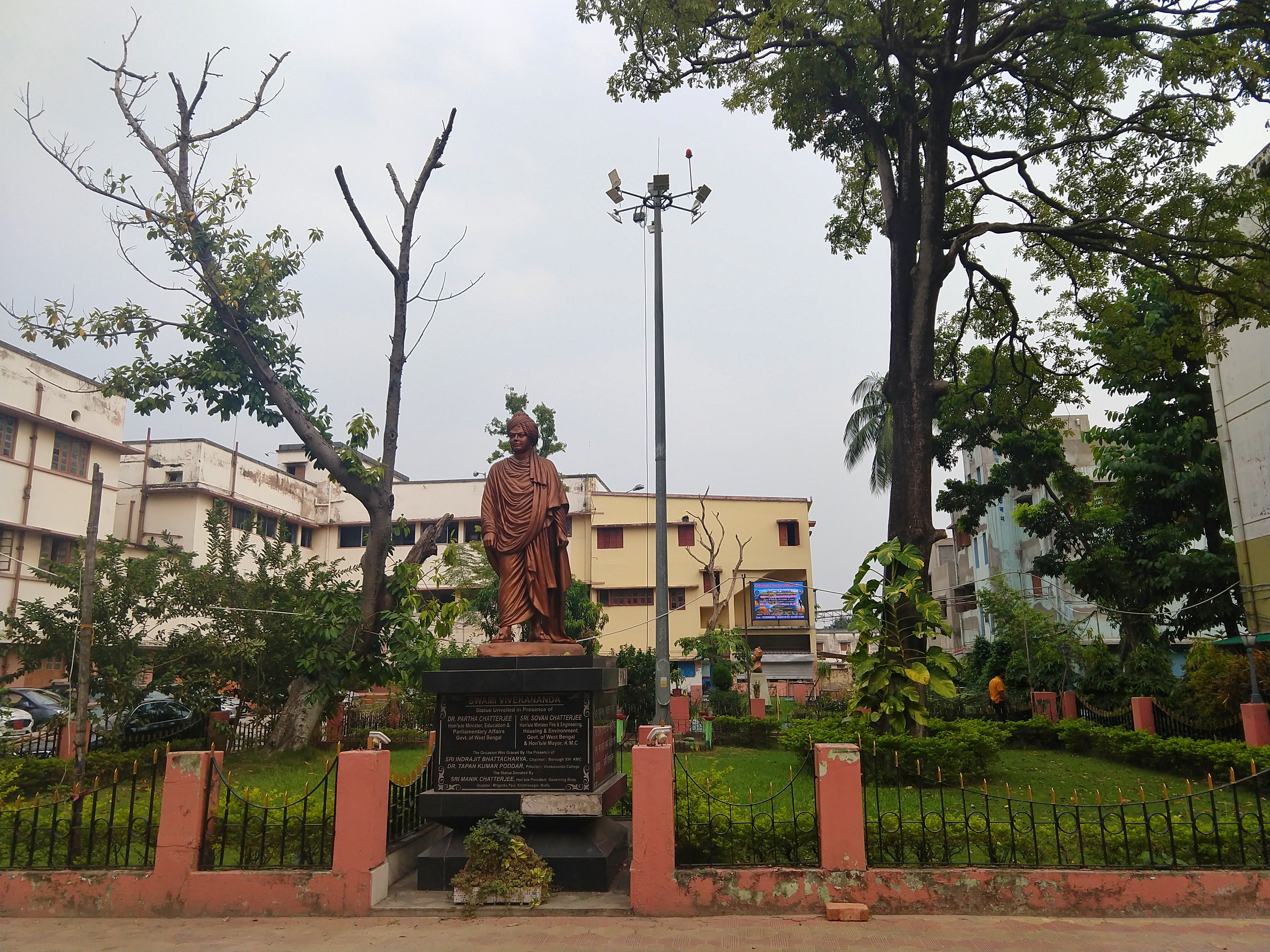
Statue of Swami Vivekananda in Vivekananda College

In 1950, it was established as Barisha College, an Intermediate College, under the state government's dispersal scheme to reduce the pressure of students from East Pakistan, present-day Bangladesh, on colleges in the Kolkata metropolis. It was first set up at Barisha High School and later shifted to its newly constructed premises near the school premises in 1953. In this time, between 1952-53, Jibanananda Das joined as an English professor in this college. He was appointed as a temporary professor of the then Barisha College, sometime in November 1952 and worked till February 1953.

In June 1956, after the college came under the sponsorship of the State Government, it was upgraded to a degree College and also brought under the Refugee Education Scheme of the Ministry of Rehabilitation of the Government of India. Afterwards, the college was renamed as "Vivekananda College" after the sacred name of Swami Vivekananda, an Indian Hindu monk, philosopher, author and religious teacher.

As the number of students increased rapidly and the lack of accommodation fell sharply, it was again shifted in 1959 to new spacious premises at Thakurpukur having a sprawling campus area of about 6.17 acres of land where the present college buildings were constructed with capital grants retrieved from the Ministry of Rehabilitation. In 1961, 29 August, the women's section of the original college building of Barisha got a status of separate independent college, named as Vivekananda College for Women. On 12 January 1963, Swami Vivekananda's birth centenary ceremony was celebrated at Vivekananda College. The program was inaugurated by the then State Government Minister Saila Kumar Mukherjee. Eminent poet, novelist and editor Achintya Kumar Sengupta was also present there on that occasion.

== Academics ==
It is a co-educational College offering Undergraduate (UG) courses in Arts, Science and Commerce streams. The college offers a three year B.Sc. Honours and General courses in 12 varied subjects namely Physics, Chemistry, Mathematics, Zoology, Botany, Environmental Science, Computer Science, Economics, Electronics, Biochemistry, Statistics and Geography. The college offers a three year B.A. Honours and General courses in varied subjects like English, Bengali, History, Political Science, Sanskrit, Philosophy, Journalism & Mass Communication. In addition, three other subjects like Human Rights, Women Studies and Film studies are also taught as B.A. General course. The college offers a three year B.Com. Honours and General course in Accounting and Finance.

This college also offers Postgraduate (PG) programmes in several courses affiliated to University of Calcutta from the session 2016-17. Those courses are M.A. in Bengali, History and M.Sc. in Physics, Zoology.

Apart from this traditional molds of course pattern, Vivekananda college has introduced some short-term self-financing courses with UGC-sponsored vocational courses like Bioinformatics, Financial accounting, Secretarial practice, Journalism, Mass communication, Film studies, Photography etc. The college offers a six month Certificate Course on Basic Photography in self-finance mode. The college also offered skill oriented programmes on Ornamental Fish Culture and Photojournalism & Videography, under UGC sponsorship.

=== Publishing ===
The college, since 2007, has been regularly publishing its peer-reviewed research journal Bodhi. Each volume of the journal consists of three separate issues: Bodhi Artham (a journal of Economics, Commerce and Management), Bodhi Kala (a journal of Humanities) and Bodhi Bijnana (a journal of Science). The journal has the ISSN 2277-4831.

=== Accreditation and recognition ===
Vivekananda College is recognized by the University Grants Commission (UGC). In 2004, Vivekananda College was awarded "B++" status in the first cycle of the college's accreditation by the National Assessment and Accreditation Council (NAAC). In 2016, it was re-accredited and awarded "Grade A" status in the second cycle of the college's accreditation by the National Assessment and Accreditation Council (NAAC). Vivekananda College has a campaign of ‘Clean and Green Campus’ recognised by NAAC Peer team on 2014 State-wise Analysis of Accreditation Reports.

In 2013-14, it was ranked 1st in the ranking of India Today's Nielsen survey as the best science college in Kolkata. All-over India, Vivekananda College was ranked 27th by the India Today Group's survey on best colleges in science stream and 1st among the colleges in West Bengal in 2017.

== Notable faculties ==
- Jibanananda Das - an Indian poet, writer, novelist and essayist in the Bengali language.
- Jibendra Singha Roy - a Bengali writer.

== See also ==
- List of colleges affiliated to the University of Calcutta
- Education in India
- Education in West Bengal
