= Fakir Chand College =

College in West Bengal

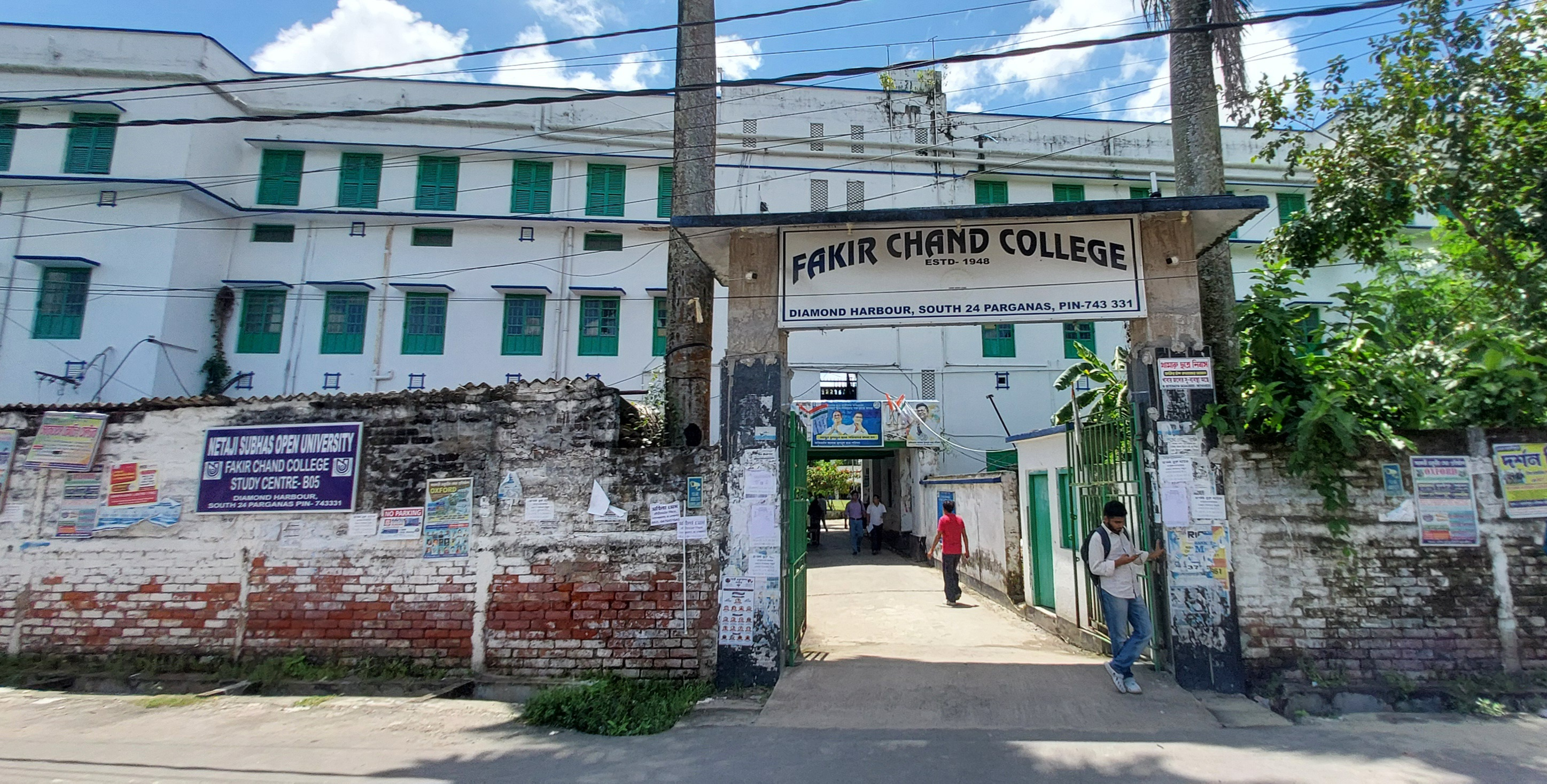
- Type: Public (Govt. Aided, UGC recognized & NAAC accredited)
- Established: 1948; 78 years ago
- Affiliations: University of Calcutta
- President: Dr. Sujit Kumar Mandal
- Principal: Dr. Somen Chanda
- Academic staff: 100+
- Administrative staff: 50+
- Undergraduates: 5500+
- Postgraduates: 100+
- Location: Ward no:16, College Rd, Diamond Harbour town, West Bengal, 743331, India; 22.1965897°N 88.1787858°E
- Campus: Urban
- Website: https://fccollege.ac.in/

- Location in West Bengal Fakir Chand College (India)

Fakir Chand College in Diamond Harbour, West Bengal, India, is a liberal arts, science and commerce Government college, situated 45 kilometres (28 mi) from Kolkata. It is affiliated to the University of Calcutta. It employs almost 100 teaching staff (50 full-time and 50 part-time, guest or visiting faculty), 50 support staff and 5,500 students. It is the oldest and largest college in the South 24 Parganas district of West Bengal. Recently, in November 2016, it has been accredited with a B++ grade by the National Assessment and Accreditation Council (NAAC), under UGC, MHRD, Govt. of India. It also has a B.Ed. department and postgraduate section offering M.A., M.Sc., and, M.Com courses under the University of Calcutta.

There are three streams of study in the college, arts, science and commerce. The college is a study center of IGNOU, Netaji Subhas Open University and University of Calcutta. The college has one N.C.C. and two N.S.S. units.

== Graduation ==
=== Science ===
- Physics
- Chemistry
- Mathematics
- Computer Science
- Electronics
- Geography
- Botany
- Zoology
- Economics

=== Language and Literature ===
- Bengali
- English
- Sanskrit

=== Social Science ===
- Education
- History
- Philosophy
- Political Science
- Music
- Physical Education

=== Commerce ===
- Finance and Accounts

=== Biological Science ===
- Zoology
- Botany

== Post Graduation ==
- Education
- Bengali
- History
- Mathematics

== Teacher Training Course (B.Ed.) ==
- Bengali
- English
- Education
- History
- Physical Education
- Visual Arts
- Music
- Mathematics
- Physics
- Chemistry

== History ==
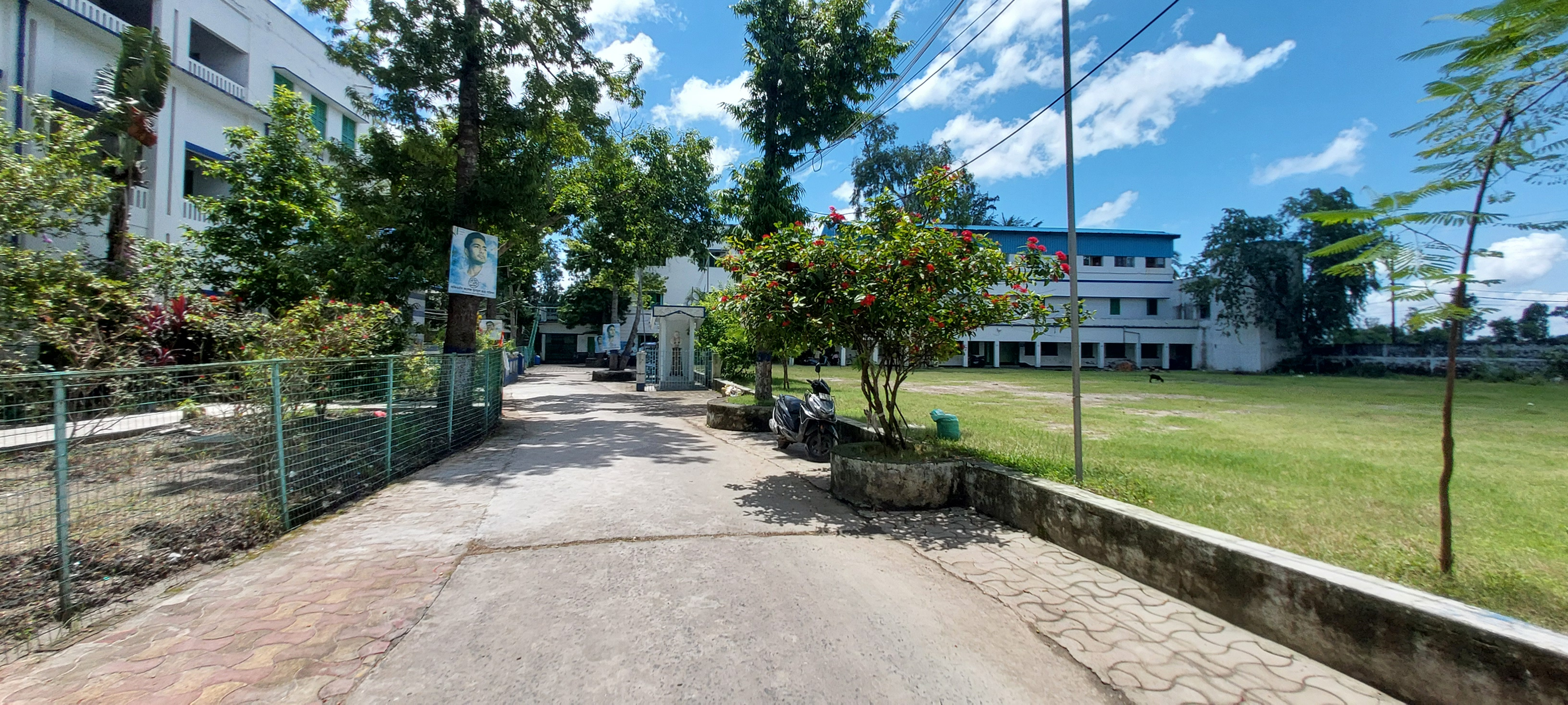
Fakir Chand College campus

Fakir Chand College stands today in Diamond Harbour in the southern part of West Bengal. It is the culmination of the vision of one man to bring higher education facilities to the people of this area. About 100 kilometres (62 mi) from south to north, there was no college before independence. The academically inclined would have to travel to Kolkata. This was a difficult proposition, physically and financially, for many.

The setting up of the college was envisioned as far back as 1925, but it was possible to set it up only in 1948, when Calcutta University planned a decentralisation of higher education. Jagadish Chandra Halder, a local businessman, set up Fakir Chand College in the memory of his father. The beginning was with intermediate courses in arts and science. In the 1955-56 academic year, undergraduate courses in arts were introduced. The years from 1958 to 1966 were vital years when undergraduate courses in science and commerce, and the B.Ed. course, were introduced during the tenure of principal A.C.Roy. In 1969, Prof. Hari Rakhal Biswas took over as principal and he introduced a sound system of administration, heralding a new era in the history of the college.

== Notable alumni ==
- Pratik Ur Rahaman, Bengali politician

== Notable faculty ==
- Jibanananda Das, Guest Faculty, Department of English
- Pannalal Halder, Nominee for Fakir Chand College ( P. G Section)

== Library ==
The college library was established by Jagadish Chandra Halder, in memory of his father, in 1948 at Diamond Harbour Boys School. In 1952, it was moved to the ground floor of the present main campus of Fakir Chand College. Initially, it only had a collection of books of arts subjects. It now has a large collection of books, reference materials, and journals of arts, science, and commerce subjects and photocopying facilities. Enough space was allotted to accommodate the library in the second floor of the college.

The library has a collection of more than 52,191 volumes and is divided into three broad sections – the UG, PG, and the B.Ed sections.

An online public access catalog is available.

== See also ==
- List of colleges affiliated to the University of Calcutta
- Education in India
- Education in West Bengal
