= Uluberia College =

- Type: Undergraduate college
- Established: 1948; 78 years ago
- Founders: Haripada Ghosal
- Affiliations: University of Calcutta
- Principal: Dr. Debasish Pal
- Location: Uluberia, West Bengal, 711315, India; 22.4694283°N 88.1067941°E
- Campus: Urban
- Website: www.uluberiacollege.in
- Location in West Bengal Uluberia College (India)

Uluberia College (Bengali: উলুবেড়িয়া কলেজ) is an undergraduate college in Uluberia, in Howrah district, West Bengal, India. The college is affiliated with the University of Calcutta.

== History ==
Uluberia College was established in 1948 by educationist Haripada Ghosal, with local donations.

== Departments and courses ==
The college offers different undergraduate and postgraduate courses and aims at imparting education to the undergraduates of lower- and middle-class people of Uluberia and its adjoining areas.

=== Science ===
Science faculty consists of the UG departments of Chemistry, Physics, Mathematics, Computer Science & Application, Botany, Zoology, Physiology, Microbiology, and Economics.Also science faculty consists of the PG department of Pure Mathematics.

=== Arts & Commerce ===
Arts and Commerce faculty consists of departments of Bengali, English, Education, Sanskrit, History, Geography, Political Science, Philosophy, and Commerce.

== Accreditation ==
Recently, Uluberia College has been re-accredited and awarded B++ grade by the National Assessment and Accreditation Council (NAAC). The college is also recognized by the University Grants Commission (UGC).

== See also ==
- List of colleges affiliated to the University of Calcutta
- Education in India
- Education in West Bengal
