= Bidhan Chandra College, Rishra =

College in Rishra, West Bengal

Bidhan Chandra College
- Type: Undergraduate college
- Established: 1957; 69 years ago
- Academic affiliations: University of Calcutta
- Principal: Dr. Ramesh Kar
- Location: 31, Grand Trunk Rd, Rishra, West Bengal 712248, India; 22°43′20.62″N 88°21′08.96″E
- Campus: Urban
- Website: https://bccrishra.ac.in/

Bidhan Chandra College, also known as Rishra College, is present at Rishra, in the Hooghly district, West Bengal, India. It offers undergraduate courses in arts, Commerce and sciences and postgraduate courses in a few subjects. It is affiliated to University of Calcutta. It was established in 1957.

== Accreditation ==
In 2016 the college was awarded B grade by the National Assessment and Accreditation Council (NAAC). The college is recognized by the University Grants Commission (UGC).

== See also ==
- List of colleges affiliated to the University of Calcutta
- Education in India
- Education in West Bengal
