= Dilip Shanghvi =

Indian businessman (born 1955)

- Born: 1 October 1955 (age 71); Amreli, Gujarat, India
- Education: University of Calcutta
- Occupations: Founder and MD of Sun Pharmaceuticals
- Spouse: Vibha Shanghvi
- Children: Two

Dilip Shanghvi (born 1 October 1955) is an Indian billionaire businessman. Shanghvi is the founder of Sun Pharmaceuticals, a pharmaceutical company. The Government of India awarded him the civilian honor of the Padma Shri in 2016. India Today magazine ranked him 8th in India's most powerful people of 2017 list. According to Forbes, as of May 2025, Shanghvi is the fifth richest person in India with an estimated net worth of US$28.9 billion.

He was the recipient of the EY Entrepreneur of the Year Award, India, 2005.

== Early life ==
Dilip Shanghvi was born in 1955 in a Jain family from Gujarat, India. He was raised in Kolkata, where his father ran a small wholesale business trading generic medicines. Shanghvi studied at J. J. Ajmera High School. and later earned a Bachelor of Commerce degree from the University of Calcutta. During his early years, he helped his father manage the family’s pharmaceutical trading business, gaining firsthand experience of the industry. This background inspired him to start manufacturing his own medicines rather than just selling other companies’ products.

== Career ==
After working in his father’s pharmaceutical distribution business in Kolkata, Dilip Shanghvi decided to start manufacturing his own medicines. In 1983, he founded Sun Pharmaceutical Industries with a small loan from his father, focusing initially on psychiatric drugs. The company began with a single manufacturing facility in Vapi, Gujarat.

Sun Pharma steadily expanded its product range and market reach over the next decade. By 1993, profits had grown significantly, allowing Shanghvi to invest in dedicated research and development facilities.

Under his leadership, Sun Pharma became known for its strategy of acquiring other companies to fuel growth. The most notable was the $4 billion acquisition of Ranbaxy Laboratories in 2014, which made Sun Pharma India’s largest pharmaceutical company and among the top global generic drug makers.

Despite facing regulatory challenges and a drop in profits between 2014 and 2018, Shanghvi steered the company through recovery. By 2023, Sun Pharma reported profits exceeding ₹8,000 crore, with strong growth in its specialty medicines segment.

In the FY 26, Sun Pharma's net profit stood at Rs 11,479 crores, and revenues were Rs 58,220 crores.

Shanghvi has also overseen international acquisitions, including US-based Ocular Technologies in 2016 and Concert Pharmaceuticals in 2023, expanding Sun Pharma’s global footprint in specialty drugs.

== Community ==
In January 2018, the Indian government appointed Shanghvi to the Reserve Bank of India's 21-member central board committee. He is chairman of the board of governors at IIT Bombay. He was made a trustee of the Rhodes scholarship programme at Oxford University in 2017.

== Personal life ==
Dilip Shanghvi was born into a Jain Family from Gujarat and follows the Jain faith. His family later moved to Kolkata. Due to a misinterpretation, he is sometimes described as a Vaishnav because of his visits to the Shrinathji temple but by birth he is Jain and also visits Hindu temples along with the Jain temples. The surname "Shanghvi" itself is associated with Jainism, and is derived from a term meaning "leader of the Jain community". He is married to Vibha Shanghvi, and they have two children, Aalok and Vidhi. Despite his wealth, Shanghvi is known for maintaining a low public profile and avoiding the limelight. He has a son, Aalok, and a daughter, Vidhi, both of whom work for Sun Pharmaceuticals.

Shanghvi is a devotee of Shrinathji and makes regular pilgrimage with his family to the deity's abode in the city of Nathdwara in Rajasthan. Photos and idols of the deity adorn Sun Pharma's factory and offices.

== Book ==
In 2019, journalist Soma Das authored The Reluctant Billionaire, the first and only biography of Dilip Shanghvi. Published by Penguin Random House, the book was nominated for Tata Literature Award in the Best Business Book category in November 2019.

Business standard called the book "an excellent read" and suggested in a review that "Soma Das has been able to capture brilliantly the essence of Dilip Shanghvi"

== See also ==
- List of billionaires
