= Diamond Harbour, India =

City in West Bengal, India

Diamond Harbour
- City
- Diamond Harbour
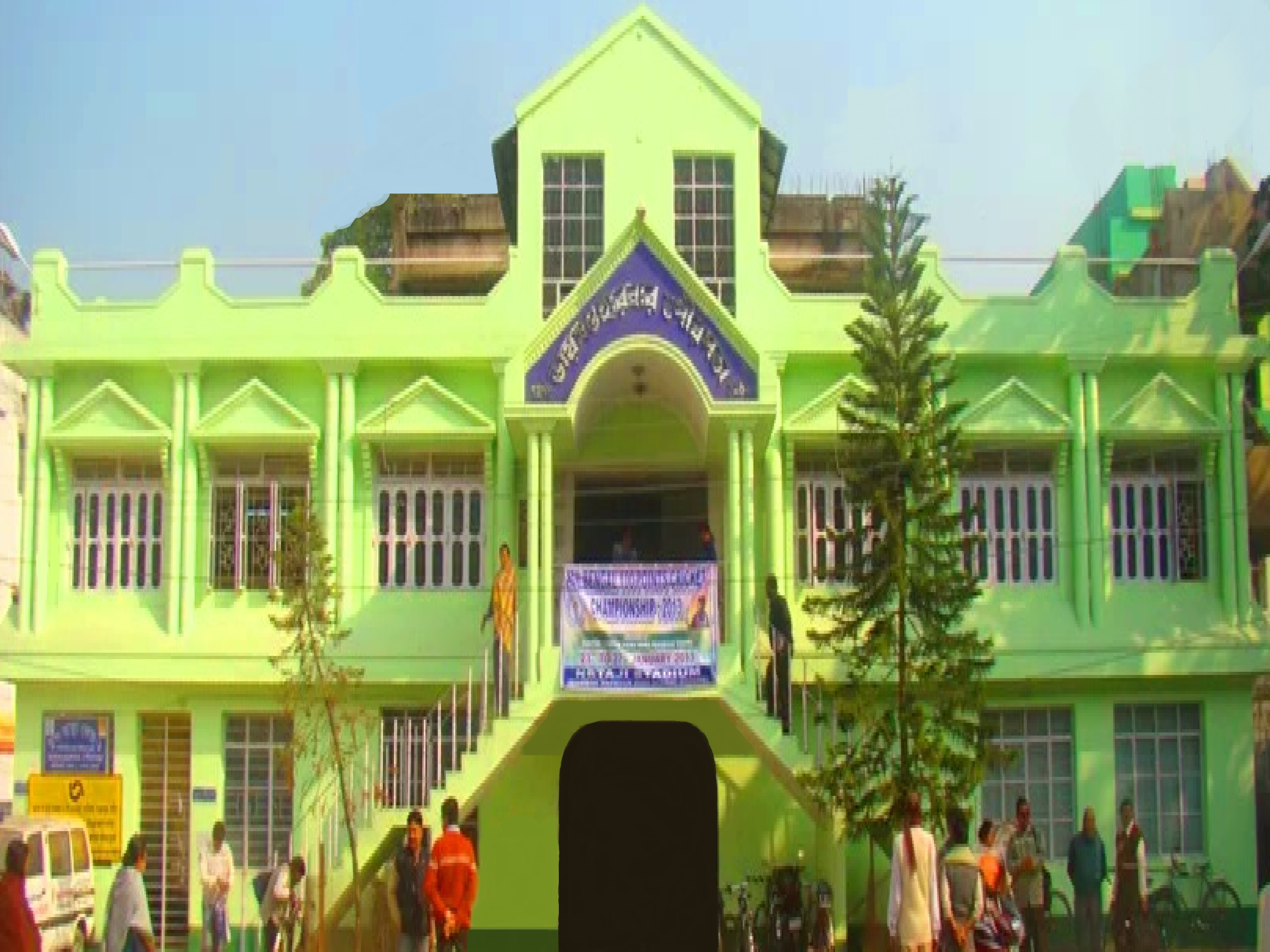
- Diamond Harbour Municipality
- Interactive map of Diamond Harbour
- Location in West Bengal Location in India Location in Asia Location in Earth
- Coordinates: 22°11′34″N 88°11′22″E
- Country: India
- State: West Bengal
- Division: Presidency
- District: South 24 Parganas

Government
  - Type: Municipality
  - Body: Diamond Harbour Municipality

Area
  - Total: 10.36 km^{2} (4.00 sq mi)
- Elevation: 7 m (23 ft)

Population (2011)
  - Total: 41,802
  - Density: 4,035/km^{2} (10,450/sq mi)

Demographics
  - Literacy: 85.93 per cent
  - Sex ratio: 986 ♂/♀

Languages
  - Official: Bengali
  - Additional official: English
- Time zone: UTC+5:30 (IST)
- PIN: 743331
- Telephone code: +91 3174
- Vehicle registration: WB-19, WB-20, WB-95, WB-96, WB-97, WB-98
- Lok Sabha constituency: Diamond Harbour
- Vidhan Sabha constituency: Diamond Harbour
- Website: diamondharbourmunicipality.org

Diamond Harbour (Bengali: [ˈɖae̯mɔɳɖ ˈhaɾbaɾ]) is a city and a municipality of South 24 Parganas district in the Indian state of West Bengal. It is the headquarters of Diamond Harbour subdivision.

== History ==
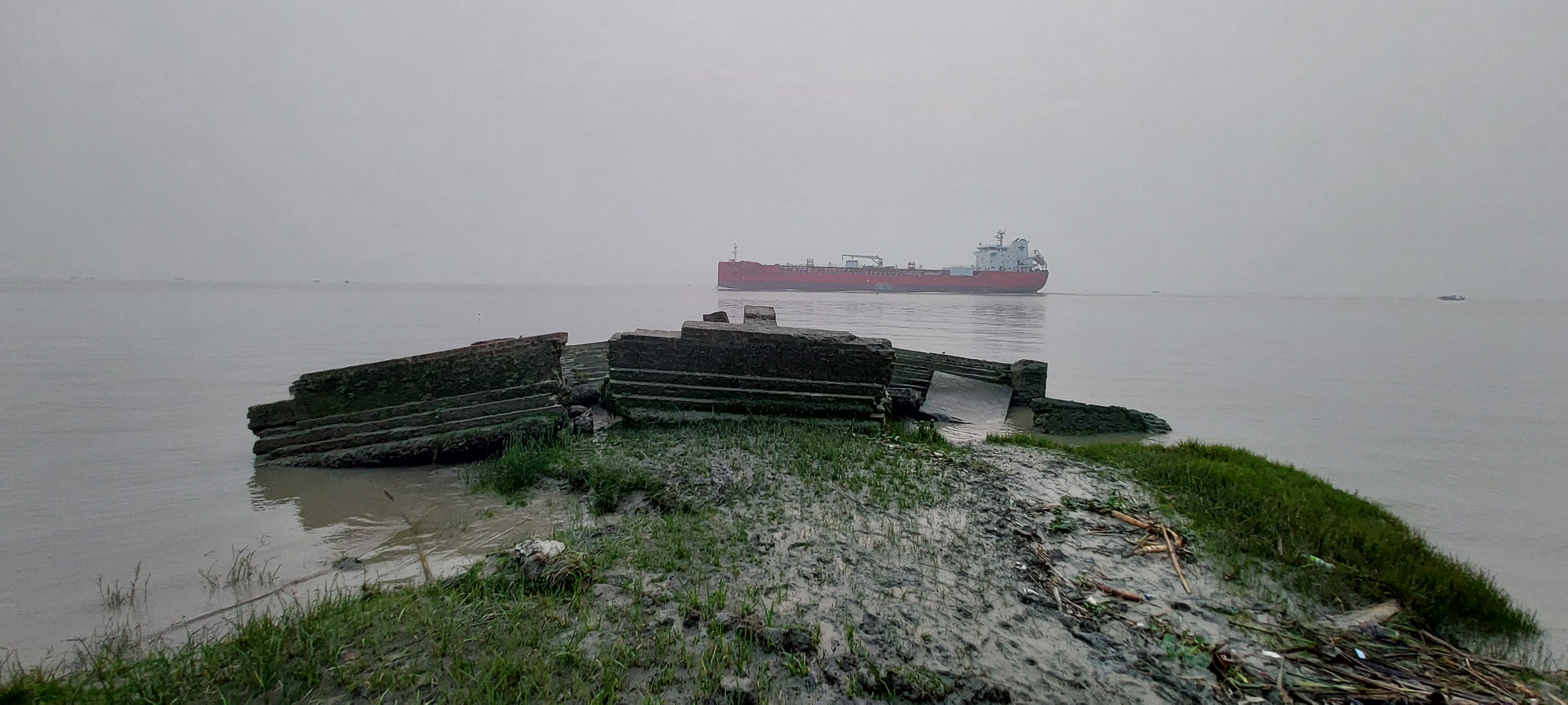
Ruins of Chingrikhali Fort on the banks of Hooghly River

Diamond Harbour was originally known as Hajipur, as it was situated on the banks of the Hajipur creek. The name Diamond Harbour was applied by the British, who used it for both river and sea shipping. The area was known since 16th and 17th-century Portuguese river pirates, (harmad). There was a fort named Chingrikhali Kella, reportedly built by Portuguese pirates during 1600s, presently dilapidated.

== Geography ==
Cities and towns in the western part of Diamond Harbour subdivision (including Falta, Diamond Harbour I & II, Kulpi CD blocks) in South 24 Parganas district
M: municipal city/ town, CT: census town, R: rural/ urban centre, N: neighbourhood, H: historical place/ religious centre
Owing to space constraints in the small map, the actual locations in a larger map may vary slightly

=== Area overview ===
Diamond Harbour subdivision is a rural subdivision with patches of urbanisation. Only 14.61% of the population lives in the urban areas and an overwhelming 85.39% lives in the rural areas. In the western portion of the subdivision (shown in the map alongside) there are 11 census towns. The entire district is situated in the Ganges Delta and the western part, located on the east bank of the Hooghly River, is covered by the Kulpi Diamond Harbour Plain, which is 5–6 metres above sea level. Archaeological excavations at Deulpota and Harinarayanpur, on the bank of the Hooghly River indicate the existence of human habitation more than 2,000 years ago.

Note: The map alongside presents some of the notable locations in the subdivision. All places marked in the map are linked in the larger full screen map.

=== Location ===
Diamond Harbour is located at 22°11′34″N 88°11′22″E. It has an average elevation of 7 metres (23 ft).

=== Climate ===
Köppen-Geiger climate classification system classifies its climate as tropical wet and dry (Aw).

The overall climate of Diamond harbour is warm and humid. The summer temperature often crosses 35 °C when it drops 15 °C. The highest temperature ever was 43.0 °C, recorded on 21 May 2002. The lowest temperature dropped was 8.2 °C, on 13 January 2003. The annual average rainfall is 1600 mm. The air is moderately humid, around 76%.

Climate data for Diamond Harbour (1991–2020, extremes 1978–2020)
Month	Jan	Feb	Mar	Apr	May	Jun	Jul	Aug	Sep	Oct	Nov	Dec	Year
Record high °C (°F)	33.2 (91.8)	38.0 (100.4)	40.6 (105.1)	41.9 (107.4)	43.0 (109.4)	40.4 (104.7)	38.0 (100.4)	38.5 (101.3)	37.5 (99.5)	37.4 (99.3)	35.6 (96.1)	32.6 (90.7)	43.0 (109.4)
Mean daily maximum °C (°F)	25.4 (77.7)	29.1 (84.4)	32.7 (90.9)	34.0 (93.2)	34.3 (93.7)	33.5 (92.3)	32.1 (89.8)	32.2 (90.0)	32.4 (90.3)	32.3 (90.1)	30.2 (86.4)	26.8 (80.2)	31.3 (88.3)
Mean daily minimum °C (°F)	13.9 (57.0)	17.9 (64.2)	22.8 (73.0)	25.8 (78.4)	26.8 (80.2)	27.2 (81.0)	26.8 (80.2)	26.8 (80.2)	26.5 (79.7)	24.6 (76.3)	19.9 (67.8)	15.1 (59.2)	22.8 (73.0)
Record low °C (°F)	6.8 (44.2)	9.8 (49.6)	14.1 (57.4)	18.0 (64.4)	18.0 (64.4)	21.4 (70.5)	23.2 (73.8)	21.5 (70.7)	20.4 (68.7)	18.5 (65.3)	13.3 (55.9)	9.7 (49.5)	6.8 (44.2)
Average rainfall mm (inches)	15.0 (0.59)	27.8 (1.09)	28.8 (1.13)	46.5 (1.83)	125.1 (4.93)	258.6 (10.18)	386.1 (15.20)	365.1 (14.37)	300.8 (11.84)	147.5 (5.81)	29.4 (1.16)	8.3 (0.33)	1,739 (68.46)
Average rainy days	1.1	1.3	1.7	2.9	6.1	12.2	16.7	17.0	13.2	6.1	1.6	0.5	80.4
Average relative humidity (%) (at 17:30 IST)	69	66	67	77	78	84	86	86	86	81	75	73	77
Source: India Meteorological Department

== Demographics ==
=== Population ===
Historical population
Year	Pop.	±%
1951	9,818	—
1961	10,135	+3.2%
1971	13,072	+29.0%
1981	20,259	+55.0%
1991	30,266	+49.4%
2001	37,234	+23.0%
2011	41,802	+12.3%
Source: Census of India

According to the 2011 Census of India, Diamond Harbour had a total population of 41,802, of which 21,050 (50.36%) were males and 20,752 (49.64%) were females. It had a population density of 4,035 inhabitants per square kilometre (10,450/sq mi) with a sex ratio of 986 females for every 1000 males. There were 3,688 persons in the age range of 0 to 6 years which is 8.82% of the total population. The Scheduled Castes numbered 5,221 (12.49%) and the Scheduled Tribes numbered 72 (0.17%). The total number of literate persons was 32,753 (85.93% of the population over 6 years) out of which males numbered 17,193 (89.57% of the male population over 6 years) and females numbered 15,560 (82.25% of the female population over 6 years). Diamond Harbour had a total of 10,048 households as per report released by 2011 Census of India.

=== Language ===
Languages of Diamond Harbour (2011)
1. Bengali (99.1%)
2. Hindi (0.82%)
3. Urdu (0.03%)
4. Others (0.01%)

At the time of the 2011 Census of India, 99.14% of the population spoke Bengali, 0.82% Hindi and 0.03% Urdu as their first language.

=== Religion ===
Religion in Diamond Harbour (2011)
Religion	Percent
Hinduism	85.98%
Islam	13.75%
Christianity	0.11%
Sikhism	0.10%
Buddhism	0.01%
Jainism	0.01%
Others or not stated	0.04%

According to the 2011 Census of India, 85.98% of the population is Hindu, 13.75% Muslim, 0.11% Christian, 0.10% Sikh, 0.01% Buddhist and 0.01% Jain. 0.04% did not state a religion in the census.

== Civic administration ==
=== Municipality ===
Diamond Harbour Municipality covers an area of 10.36 km^{2} (4.00 sq mi). It has jurisdiction over the entire city of Diamond Harbour. The municipality was established in 1982; 44 years ago. It is divided into 16 administrative wards. According to the 2022 municipal election, it is being controlled by the All India Trinamool Congress.

=== Police stations ===
Diamond Harbour police station covers an area of 134 km^{2} (52 sq mi). It has jurisdiction over parts of the Diamond Harbour Municipality, and the Diamond Harbour I and Diamond Harbour II CD blocks.

Diamond Harbour women police station has jurisdiction over parts of the Diamond Harbour Municipality, and the Diamond Harbour I and Diamond Harbour II CD blocks.

=== CD block HQ ===
The headquarters of the Diamond Harbour I CD block are located at Diamond Harbour.

== Transport ==
Diamond Harbour is on the National Highway 12. Diamond Harbour railway station is on the Sealdah–Diamond Harbour line of the Kolkata Suburban Railway.

=== Commuters ===
With the electrification of the railways, suburban traffic has grown tremendously since the 1960s. As of 2005–06, more than 1.7 million (17 lakhs) commuters use the Kolkata Suburban Railway system daily. After the partition of India, refugees from East Pakistan/ Bangladesh had a strong impact on the development of urban areas in the periphery of Kolkata. The new immigrants depended on Kolkata for their livelihood, thus increasing the number of commuters. Eastern Railway runs 1,272 EMU trains daily.

== Education ==
- Diamond Harbour Government Medical College and Hospital, established in 2019, is a full-fledged tertiary referral government medical college.
- Diamond Harbour Government Polytechnic, established in 2014, offers diploma, undergraduate and postgraduate degree courses in Engineering and Technology and other allied fields.
- Diamond Harbour Women's University, established in 2013, is the first university of the state for women.
- Fakir Chand College, established in 1948, is affiliated with the University of Calcutta. It offers honours courses in Bengali, English, Sanskrit, history, political science, philosophy, economics, geography, education, mathematics and accounting & finance, and general degree courses in arts, science, and accounting & finance.

== Healthcare ==
Diamond Harbour Subdivisional Hospital, with 250 beds, is the major government medical facility in the Diamond Harbour subdivision.

== Notable people ==
- Kibu Vicuña, Head coach of the Diamond Harbour Football Club ( 2022 - Present)

== Gallery ==
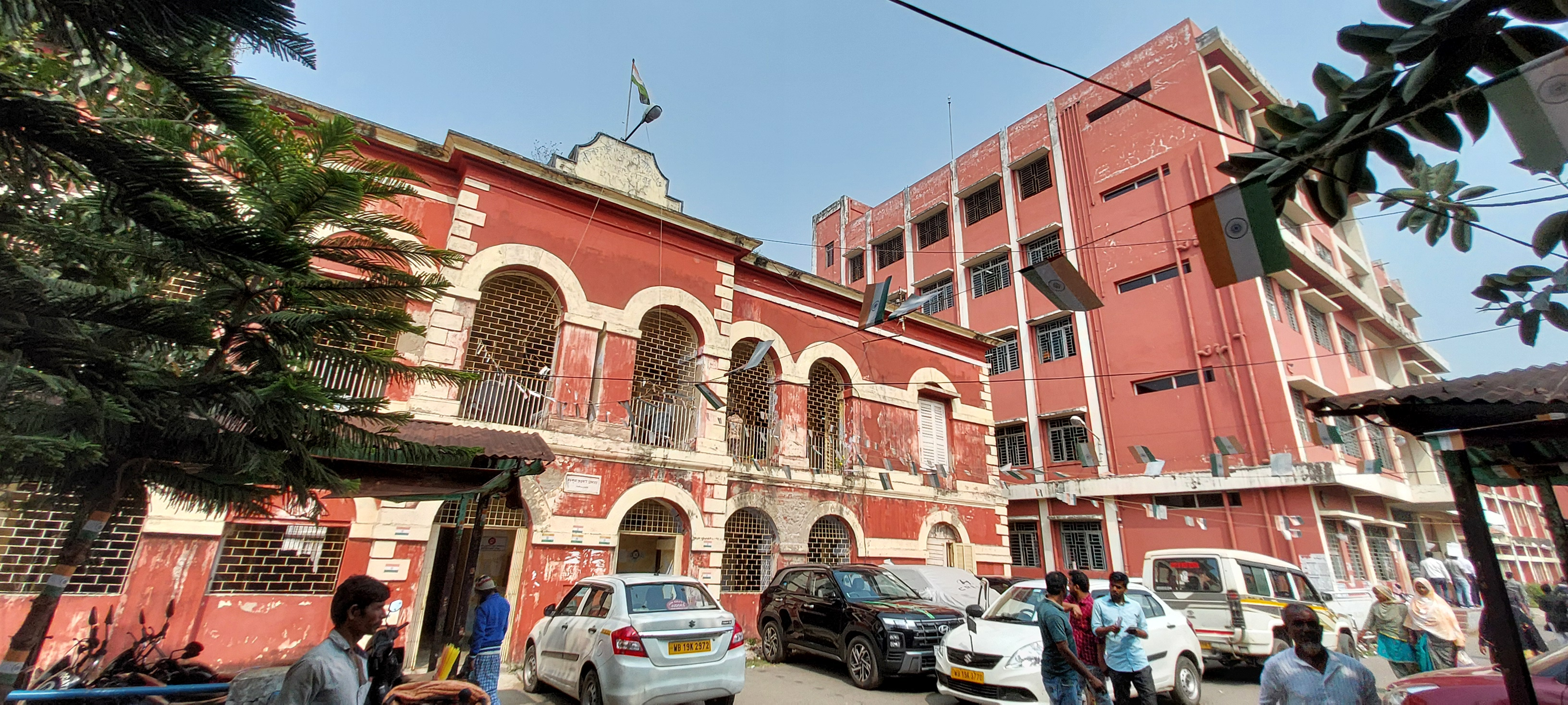
Diamond Harbour Sub-divisional Court

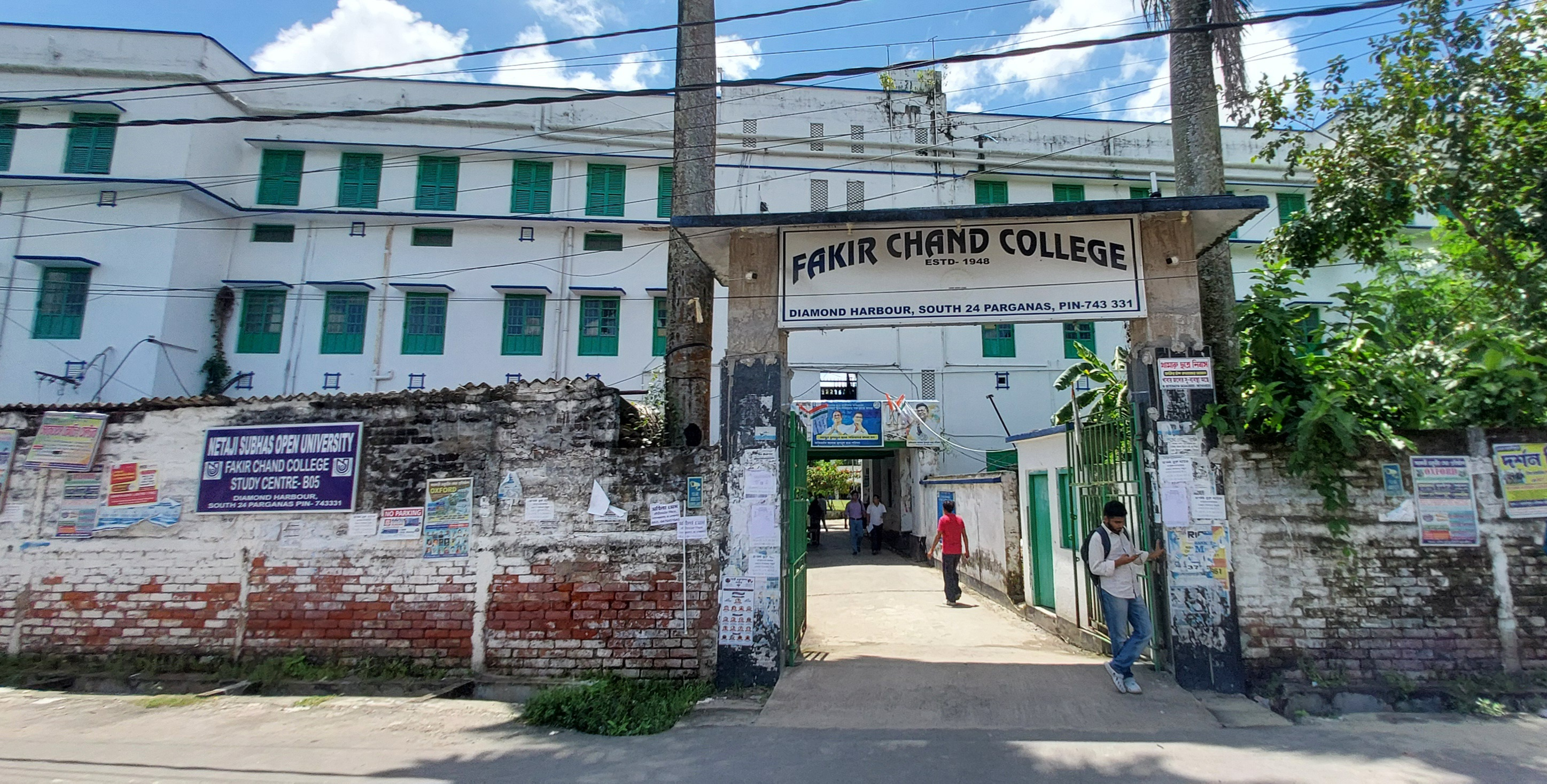
Fakir Chand College of Diamond Harbour

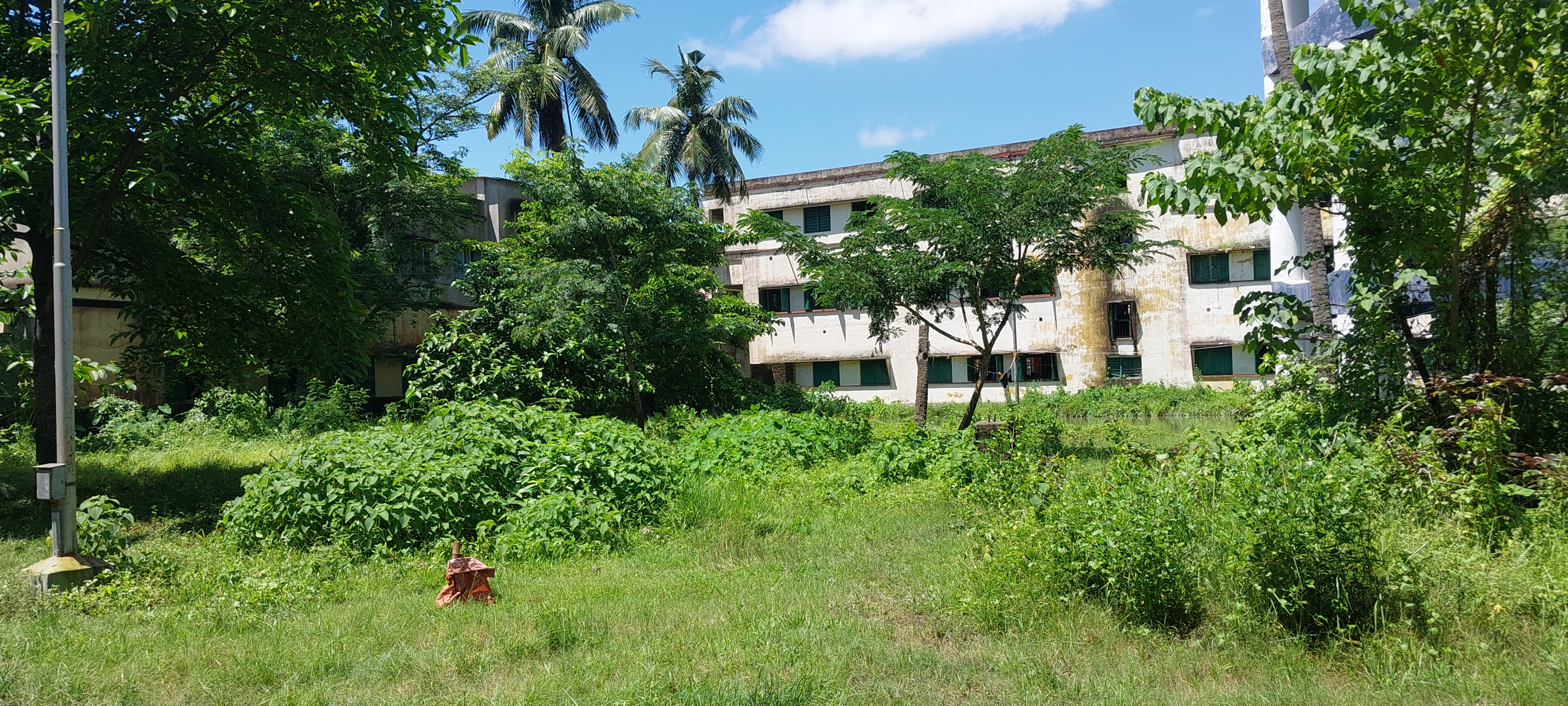
Diamond Harbour High School

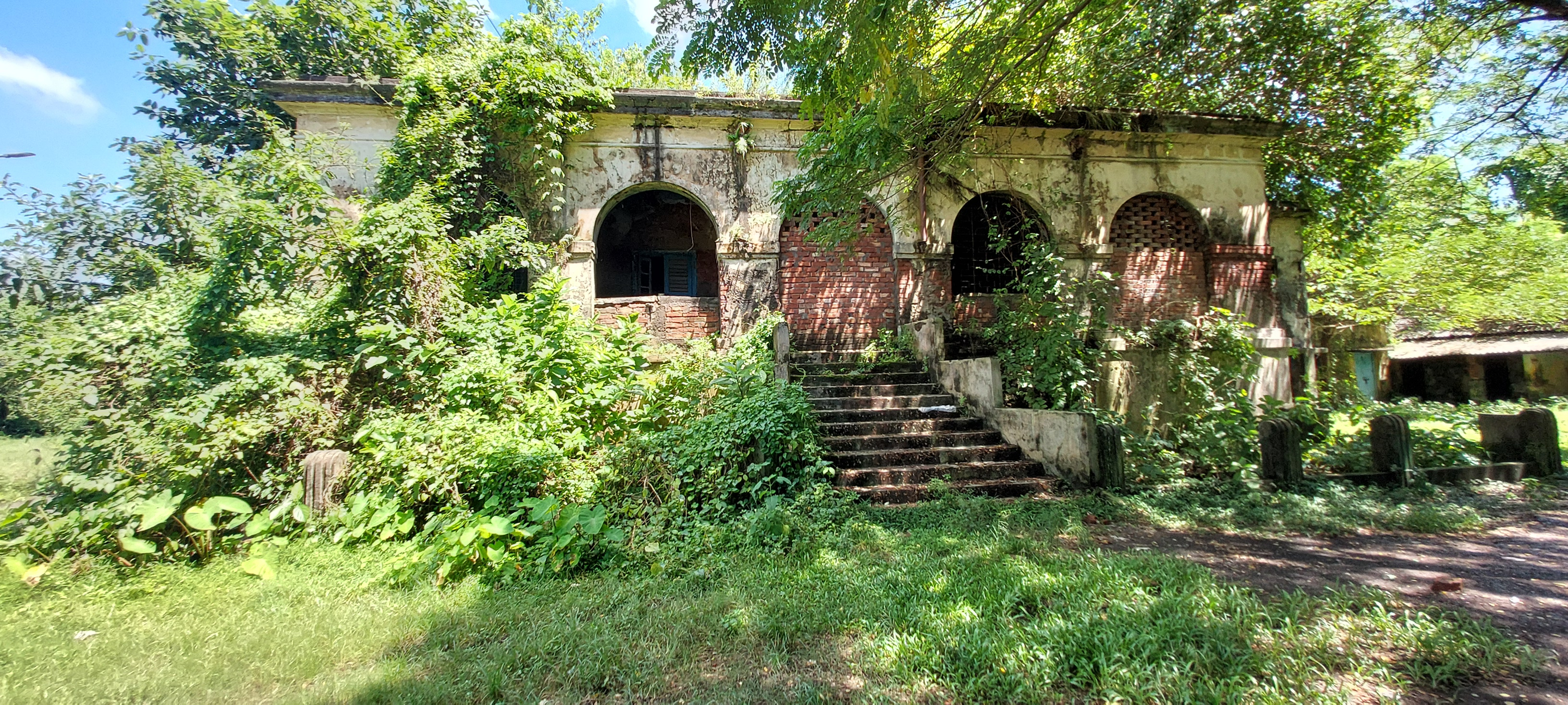
Old Court building, Diamond Harbour

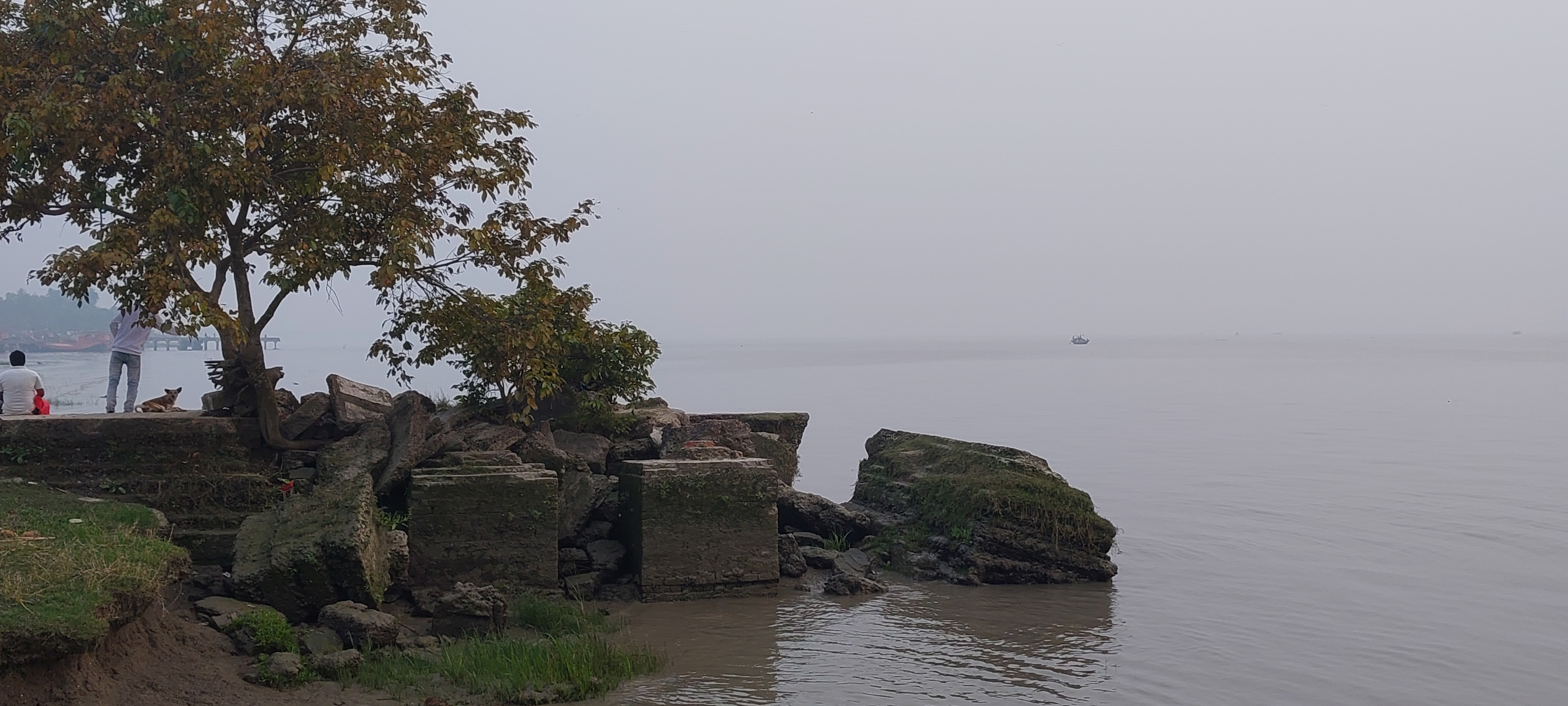
Ruined Portuguese fort of Diamond Harbour

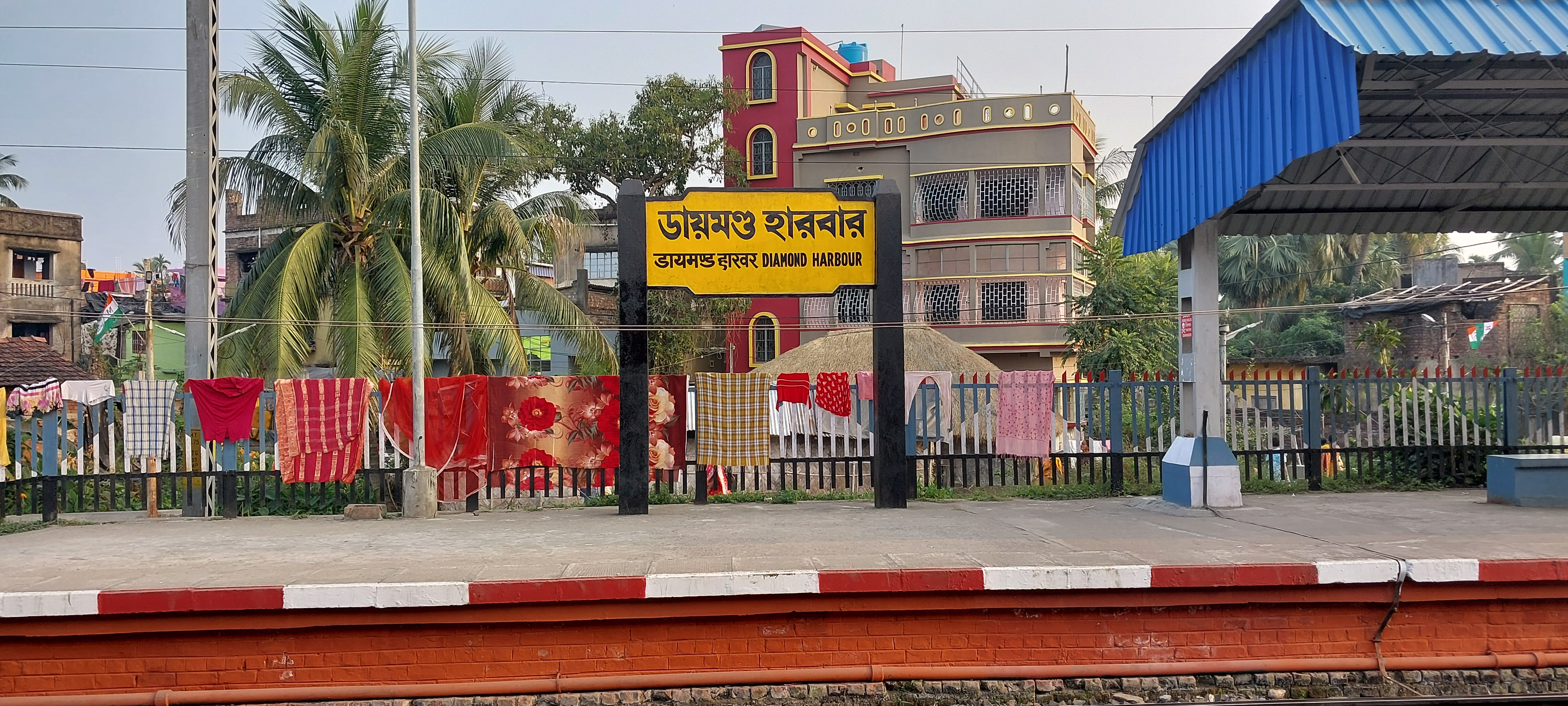
Diamond Harbour railway station

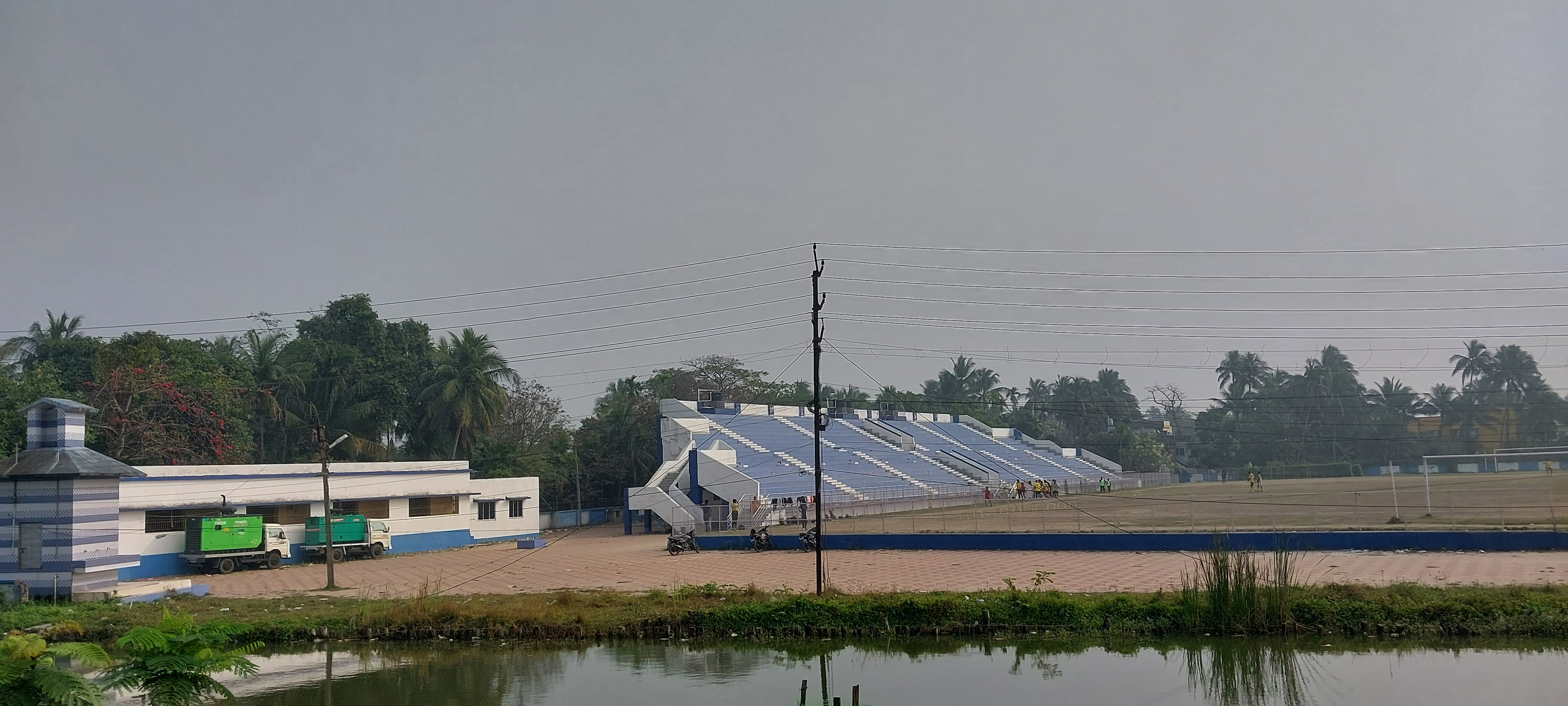
Diamond Harbour stadium

== See also ==
- Jaynagar Majilpur
- Budge Budge
- Maheshtala
- Howrah
- Basirhat
- Barasat
- Tamluk
