= Lux Industries =

Indian hosiery company

Lux Industries Limited
- Formerly: Biswanath Hosiery Mills Ltd. (1957–1995)
- Type: Public
- Traded as: BSE: 539542; NSE: LUXIND
- Industry: Innerwear
- Founded: 1957; 69 years ago
- Founder: Girdharilal Todi
- Headquarters: Kolkata, West Bengal, India
- Key people: Pradip Kumar Todi (MD); Ashok Todi (Chairman)
- Brands: Lux Champion, Lux Nitro, Lux Venus, Lux Venus Her, Lux Venus Rainwear, Lux Inferno, Lyra - Womenwear, Lux Cozi, Lux Parker, ONN, Lux Cott's Wool, Lux Classic, GenX, Lux Amore, Lux Karishma, Lux Lovely
- Revenue: ₹ 2312 cr (FY 2021–22)

Lux Industries Limited, previously known as Biswanath Hosiery Mills, is an Indian apparel manufacturing company headquartered in Kolkata. It manufactures innerwear and various kinds of hosiery and fashion wear products for men, women and children.

== History ==
Lux Industries was set up as the Biswanath Hosiery Mills in 1957 by Girdharilal Todi. His sons took over the operating responsibilities in 1964. It launched the Consumer Coupon Scheme in 1992 (Mazedar Mauka). In the same year, Lux employed celebrity brand ambassadors. In 1992, Lux launched their first television commercial with the famous yeh andar ki baat hai tagline. The following year saw the company launch their export operations, with offices in the Middle East, Europe, and Africa.

In 1995, the company changed its name to Lux Industries Limited. This was followed in short order by the establishment of over 500,000 retail outlets across India, and offices in Kolkata, Delhi, Agra, Indore, Mumbai, Ludhiana, Jaipur, and Roorkee. Bollywood actor Sunny Deol was signed on as Lux's brand ambassador in the year 2000. In 2001, Lux went public and for the first time, ownership of the company was available outside of the Todi family. In 2003, the company launched its IPO. In 2010, Bollywood actor Shah Rukh Khan was signed as a brand ambassador for Lux. In 2018, Bollywood actor Amitabh Bachchan was signed as a brand ambassador for Lux.

On 24 January 2022, capital markets regulator SEBI barred 14 entities for indulging in insider trading and ordered impounding ill-gotten gains of Rs 2.94 crore in the matter of Lux Industries Ltd. Those banned by Sebi included executive director and son of the managing director, Udit Todi, according to an interim order. The surveillance alert system of Sebi had detected suspicious trading pattern in the scrip of Lux around the announcement dated 25 May 2021 regarding the audited financial results for the quarter and financial year ended 31 March 2021, wherein substantial increase in profits both on a quarter-on-quarter as well as a year-on-year basis was observed. The ban on Udit Todi and others was revoked by SEBI in November 2023 and the insider trading charges were dropped.
