= Sun Pharma =

Indian multinational pharmaceutical company

Sun Pharmaceutical Industries Limited
- Type: Public
- Traded as: BSE: 524715; NSE: SUNPHARMA; BSE SENSEX constituent; NSE NIFTY 50 constituent
- ISIN: INE044A01036
- Industry: Pharmaceuticals
- Founded: 1983; 43 years ago
- Founder: Dilip Shanghvi
- Headquarters: Mumbai, Maharashtra, India
- Area served: Worldwide
- Key people: Dilip Shanghvi (MD)
- Products: Pharmaceutical drugs; generic drugs; antiviral drugs; over-the-counter drugs; vaccines; diagnostics; contact lenses; animal health; dietary supplements; protein supplements
- Revenue: ▲₹52,578 crore (US$5.5 billion) (2025)
- Operating income: ▲₹15,271 crore (US$1.6 billion) (2025)
- Net income: ▲₹11,984 crore (US$1.3 billion) (2025)
- Total assets: ▲₹92,100 crore (US$9.6 billion) (2025)
- Total equity: ▲₹72,485 crore (US$7.6 billion) (2025)
- Owner: Dilip Shanghvi family (54.48%)
- Number of employees: 41,000+ (2023)
- Website: sunpharma.com
- Footnotes; Financials as of 31 March 2025.

Sun Pharmaceutical Industries Limited (d/b/a Sun Pharma) is an Indian multinational pharmaceutical company headquartered in Mumbai. It manufactures and sells pharmaceutical formulations and active pharmaceutical ingredients (APIs) in more than 100 countries. It is the largest pharmaceutical company in India and the fourth largest specialty generic pharmaceutical company in the world.

Around 70% of Sun Pharma’s revenue is generated from international markets. The US and India are the largest markets, accounting for over 60% of the company's turnover. Manufacturing is across 43 locations in India, the US, Asia, Africa, Australia and Europe. The products cater to therapeutic segments covering psychiatry, anti-infectives, neurology, cardiology, diabetology, gastroenterology, ophthalmology, nephrology, urology, dermatology, gynaecology, respiratory, oncology, dental and nutritionals. Its active pharmaceutical products include baricitinib, brivaracetam, and dapaglifozin.

== History ==
Sun Pharmaceutical Industries Ltd. was established by Dilip Shanghvi in 1983 in Calcutta, West Bengal with five psychiatry products and a two-person marketing team.

Sun Pharma was listed on the stock exchange in 1994 in an issue that was oversubscribed 55 times. The founding family continues to hold a majority stake in the company.

In 1996, Sun purchased a bulk drug manufacturing plant at Ahmednagar from Knoll Pharmaceuticals. Other notable acquisitions include plants of Gujarat Lyka Organics (1996), MJ Pharma (1996), and Tamil Nadu Dadha Pharmaceuticals Limited (1997). Also in 1997, Sun Pharma initiated their first foray into the international market with the acquisition of Caraco Pharmaceuticals based in Detroit.

In 1998, Sun acquired a number of respiratory brands from Natco Pharma. It acquired Melmet Labs (1999), Pradeep Drug Company (2000), Phlox Pharma (2004), a formulation plant in the US and Hungary from Valeant Pharma and Able Labs (2005), and Chattem Chemicals (2008).

In 2010, the company acquired a controlling stake in Taro Pharmaceuticals, amongst the largest generic dermatology companies in the US, with operations across Canada and Israel.

In 2012, Sun announced acquisitions of two US companies: DUSA Pharmaceuticals, a dermatology device company; and generics business of URL Pharma.

In 2014, Sun Pharma entered into a licensing agreement with Merck & Co. Inc. to acquire rights for Tildrakizumab (MK- 3222) for treatment of chronic plaque psoriasis.

To access sterile injectable capacity in the US, it acquired Pharmalucence in the US in the same year.

On 6 April 2014, Sun Pharma announced the acquisition of Ranbaxy Laboratories in a US$4 billion transaction to create the world's fifth-largest specialty generic pharmaceutical company by sales. In December 2014, the Competition Commission of India approved Sun Pharma's $3.2 billion bid to buy Ranbaxy Laboratories, but ordered the firms to divest seven products to prevent adverse impact on market competition.

In March 2015, Sun Pharma announced it had agreed to buy GlaxoSmithKline's opiates business in Australia.

In 2016, Sun Pharma acquired 14 prescription brands from Novartis in Japan to enter the Japanese market. It also acquired Ocular Technologies to strengthen its branded ophthalmic portfolio and Biosintez to enhance its presence in the Russian market.

Sun Pharma launched its first branded ophthalmic product in the US, BromSite in 2016. In 2017, the company launched its specialty product Odomzo and then in 2018 another specialty product Ilumya (tildrakizumab-asmn) was launched to treat moderate-to-severe plaque psoriasis.

In 2019, Sun Pharma acquired Pola Pharma in Japan to strengthen its global dermatology presence. The company entered the Greater China market by partnering with China Medical System Holdings as well as launched a speciality product, Cequa, in the United States for the treatment of dry eyes.

In 2023, Sun Pharma acquired a late-stage American biotechnology company Concert Pharmaceuticals, and a 60% stake in animal healthcare company Vivaldis Animal Health and Foods.

In September 2023, Sun Pharma went into a licensing agreement with Pharmazz Inc.

In January 2024, Sun Pharma entered into a definitive merger with Taro Pharmaceuticals to acquire the remaining stake in Taro Pharma for $347.73 million.

In March 2025, it was announced Sun Pharma had acquired the Waltham, Massachusetts headquartered immunotherapy and targeted oncology treatment company, Checkpoint Therapeutics for $355 million.

In April 2026, Sun Pharma acquired US based Organon & Co. at $11.75 billion.

== SPARC ==
In 2007, Sun Pharma demerged its innovative R&D arm, and listed it separately on the stock market as the Sun Pharma Advanced Research Company Ltd. (NSE: SPARC, BSE: 532872). In 2013, SPARC declared revenue of ₹873 million. SPARC focuses on new chemical entities (NCE) research and new drug delivery systems and offers an annual update of its pipeline (NDDS).
