= Left Front government in West Bengal =

Communist rule of western Bengal region, ruled late 20th and early 21st century

Communist Party of India (Marxist)
- 1977–2011
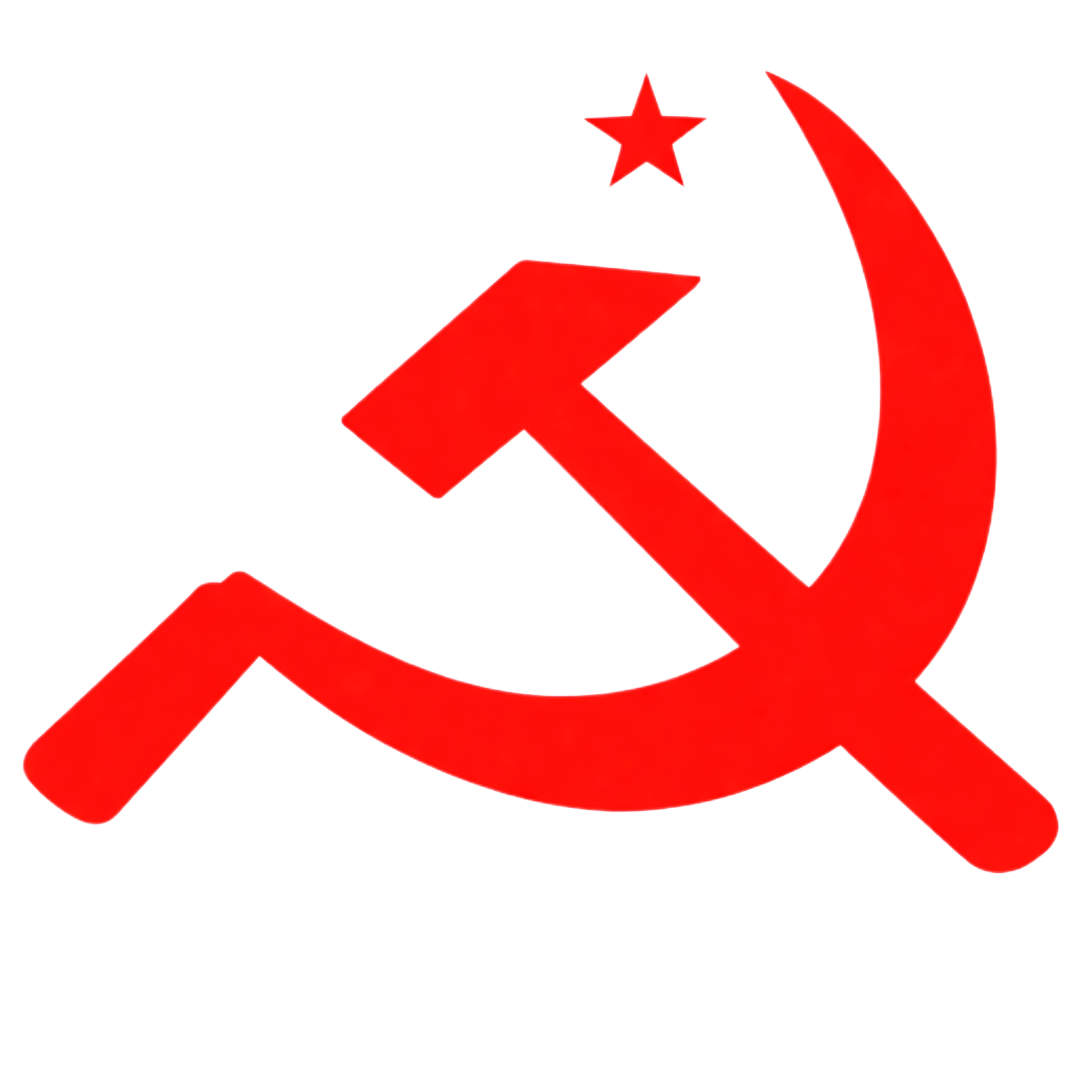
- Capital: Calcutta
- Common languages: Bengali, English
- Religion: None
- Government: Democracy
  - 1977–2000: Jyoti Basu
  - 2000–2011: Buddhadeb Bhattacharjee
- Historical era: Post Independence politics of West Bengal
  - Established: 1977
  - Disestablished: 2011
Preceded by	Succeeded by
Indian National Congress; Bangla Congress	Trinamool Congress

The 34 years of Left Front led Government in West Bengal during 1977–2011 refers to the consequently winning of the Communist Party of India (Marxist)-led Left Front in the West Bengal Legislative Assembly elections and democratically forming Government for seven terms starting from 1977 to 2011 (34 years) in the Indian state of West Bengal. This period (1977–2011) is the longest serving of any democratically elected communists-led Government in the world. The "34 years of Left Front rule in West Bengal" is a well used political term coined by politicians in the West Bengal politics as well as politics of India.

It was started from 1977, when Left Front, led by Communist Party of India (Marxist) won 1977 Assembly elections in Indian state of West Bengal with 2/3rd majority suppressing Janata Dal and Indian National Congress. Left Front of West Bengal included Communist Party of India (Marxist), All India Forward Bloc, Revolutionary Socialist Party, Marxist Forward Bloc, Revolutionary Communist Party of India and the Biplabi Bangla Congress, while Communist Party of India, West Bengal Socialist Party and Democratic Socialist Party joined in later years. Jyoti Basu was sworn in as Chief Minister of West Bengal after being elected from Satgachhia constituency. The Left Front ruled the state for seven consecutive terms 1977–2011, five with Jyoti Basu as Chief Minister and two under Buddhadev Bhattacharya. The rule ended in 2011, when Trinamool Congress historically defeated Left Front in 2011 Assembly elections.

== Left Front and the politics of West Bengal ==
=== Left Front ===
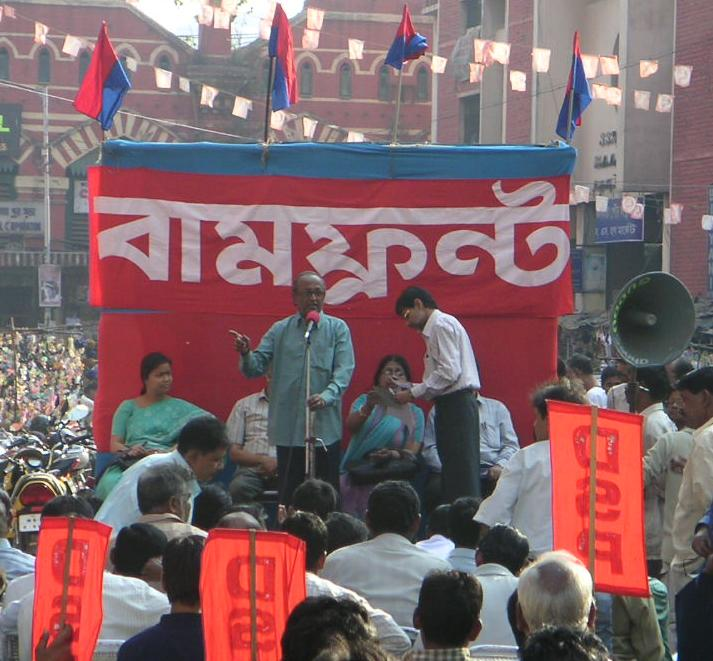
An electoral meeting of Left Front. Banner states 'Bamfront', Bengali of 'Left Front'.

The Left Front (Bengali: বাম ফ্রন্ট; baam front) is a left-leaning alliance of left and communist political parties in of West Bengal. It was formed in January 1977, which subsequently won 1977 West Bengal Legislative Assembly election in June 1977 and formed Government in the state. The alliance won every election after that up to 2011 and formed Governments for consequent 7 times.

The Left Front includes:

- Communist Party of India (Marxist)
- Communist Party of India
- All India Forward Bloc
- Revolutionary Socialist Party
- Revolutionary Communist Party of India
- Marxist Forward Bloc

=== Elections ===
Assembly elections
Year	Total seats	Winning Party/alliance				Opposition				Others	Remarks	Ref(s)
Year	Total seats	Party/alliance	Seats contested	Seats won	Vote share	Party/alliance	Seats contested	Seats	Vote share	Others	Remarks	Ref(s)
1977	294	Left Front: CPIM; AIFB; RSP; RCPI; MFB; BBC; Independent	CPIM- 224; AIFB- 36; RSP- 23; RCPI-4; MFB-3; BBC-2; Ind-1	Total: 231: CPIM- 178; AIFB- 25; RSP- 20; RCPI-3; MFB-3; BBC-2; Ind-1	45.61%	JNP	289	29	20.02%	INC(R) won 20 seats among 290 contested with 23.02%vote share; CPI won 2 seats among 63 contested with 2.62%vote share; SUCI won 4 seats among 29 contested with 1.48%vote share; IUML won 1 seats among 32 contested with 0.38%vote share; WPI won 1 seats among 2 contested with 0.2%vote share	The election marked the beginning of the 34-year Left Front rule in West Bengal. Jyoti Basu became chief minister and First Basu Ministry formed. Prafulla Chandra Sen became leader of opposition.	
1982	294	Left Front: CPIM; AIFB; RSP; CPI; RCPI; MFB; BBC; WBSP; DSP	CPIM- 209; AIFB- 34; RSP- 23; CPI-12; RCPI-3; MFB-2; BBC-1; WBSP and DSP-10	Total: 231: CPIM- 174; AIFB- 28; RSP- 19; CPI-7; RCPI-2; MFB-2; WBSP and DSP-6	52.78%	Indian National Congress (I)	250	49	35.73	IC(S)-4 seats; SUCI- 2 seats; Independent-1	Jyoti Basu became chief minister and Second Basu Ministry formed. Siddhartha Shankar Ray became leader of opposition.	
1987	294	Left Front: CPIM; AIFB; RSP; CPI; RCPI; MFB; BBC; WBSP; DSP	CPIM- 212; AIFB- 34; RSP- 23; CPI-12; RCPI-3; MFB-2; BBC-1; WBSP and DSP-7	Total: 231: CPIM- 187; AIFB- 26; RSP- 18; CPI-11; RCPI-1; MFB-2; WBSP and DSP-6	38.49	Indian National Congress (I)	250	49	35.73	IC(S) won 4 seats; SUCI won 2 seats; 1 independent candidate won	Jyoti Basu remained chief minister and Third Basu Ministry formed. Siddhartha Shankar Ray remained leader of opposition.	
1991	294	Left Front: CPIM; AIFB; RSP; CPI; RCPI; MFB; BBC; WBSP; DSP	CPIM- 204; AIFB- 34; RSP- 23; CPI-12; RCPI-3; MFB-2; BBC-1; WBSP and DSP-6; and allies: Janata Dal-8; CRLI-1; ABGL-1	Total: 244: CPIM- 182; AIFB- 29; RSP- 18; CPI-6; RCPI-1; MFB-2; WBSP and DSP-6; Janata Dal-1	48.57	Indian National Congress (I)	250	49	35.73	IC(S) won 4 seats; SUCI won 2 seats; 1 independent candidate won	Jyoti Basu remained chief minister and Third Basu Ministry formed. Siddhartha Shankar Ray remained leader of opposition.	
1996		Left Front			INC							
2001		Left Front			INC							
2006		Left Front			INC							
2011		Left Front			INC							
Parliamentary elections
Year	Total seats	Party wise results									Remarks	Ref(s)
Year	Total seats	Seats contested			Seats won			Vote share			Remarks	Ref(s)
Local body elections
Year	Type	Bodies won (by parties/alliance)									Remarks	Ref(s)

=== Major opposition parties ===
- Janata Dal

- Indian National Congress

- All India Trinamool Congress

=== Political controversies ===
==== 1979 Marichjhanpi Massacre ====
The massacre in Marichjhanpi, which took place under CPI(M) rule in Bengal between January 26 and May 16, 1979, relates to the eviction of refugees from the reserved island of Marichjhanpi, Sunderbans, who had fled from East Pakistan thereby leading to the death of a sizable population among them.

Out of the 14,388 families who deserted [for West Bengal], 10,260 families returned to their previous places ... and the remaining 4,128 families perished in transit, died of starvation, exhaustion, and many were killed in Kashipur, Kumirmari, and Marichjhapi by police firings (Biswas 1982, 19).

After leading the Left Front government for consecutive five terms, Jyoti Basu retired from active politics and Buddhadeb Bhattacharjee was appointed as his successor. In 2000, the Left Front came back to the power with Buddhadeb Bhattacharjee again assuming the office of the Chief Minister.

The state's economic recovery gathered momentum after economic reforms in India were introduced in the early 1990s by the central government, aided by election of a new reformist Chief Minister Buddhadeb Bhattacharjee in 2000. About during 2007, armed activists, and Maoists have been organizing terrorist attacks in some parts of the state, while clashes with the administration have taken place at several sensitive places on the issue of industrial land acquisition.

==== Singur Tata Nano controversy ====
The Buddhadeb Bhattacharjee government wanted to set up a Tata Nano factory in Singur, Hooghly. Tata Motors started constructing a factory to manufacture a car, Tata Nano which was estimated to cost $2,500. The small cars were scheduled to roll out of the factory by 2008. Singur was chosen by the Tata Motors among six sites offered by the West Bengal state government. The project faced massive opposition from displaced farmers. The unwilling farmers were given political support by West Bengal's then-opposition leader Mamata Banerjee. Banerjee's "Save Farmland" movement was supported by civil rights and human rights groups, legal bodies, and social activists like Medha Patkar, Anuradha Talwar, Arundhati Roy and Magsaysay and Jnanpith Award-winning author Mahasweta Devi. Leftist activists also shared the platform with Banerjee's Trinamool Congress. The Tatas finally decided to move out of Singur on 3 October 2008. On 7 October 2008, the Tatas announced that they would be setting up the Tata Nano plant in Sanand in Gujarat after Ratan Tata received a call from the then Chief Minister of Gujarat, Narendra Modi.

==== Nandigram violence ====
The Nandigram violence was an incident in Nandigram, West Bengal where, under the orders of the Left Front government, more than 4,000 heavily armed police stormed the Nandigram area with the aim of stamping out protests against the West Bengal government's plans to expropriate 10,000 acres (40 km^{2}) of land for a Special Economic Zone (SEZ) to be developed by the Indonesian-based Salim Group. The area of Nandigram had turned into an internal-security threat for the country. The Trinamool Congress, collaborating with the Maoists, had isolated the entire area from the rest of the country, by cutting up all the roads and blocking them by tree trunks. Weapons were being collected and stored for an armed rebellion. The villagers were brainwashed against the Government and the progressive scheme. However, the shootings, in recent developments have proved to be a conspiracy of the TMC and Maoists alike. Indeed, the police had to resort to firing when the armed mob refused to disperse even after much persuasion and tear gassing and started attacking the police. The then Chief Minister, Buddhadeb Bhattacharya was awarded a clean-chit for non-involvement in the Nandigram violence by the CBI. The police shot 13 villagers dead and one died from a very suspicious knife-attack, thus sparking controversies whether the police were, in the least, the ones to fire. At least 30 police officers were injured in the incident.

The SEZ controversy started when the government of West Bengal decided that the Salim Group of Indonesia would set up a chemical hub under the SEZ policy at Nandigram, a rural area in the district of Purba Medinipur. The villagers took over the administration of the area and all the roads to the villages were cut off.

== Land reforms and agriculture ==
Left Front is considered for the most successful land reforms in India. While land reform had not made much headway in most of India, West Bengal has achieved many notable land reforms compared to it in fields like redistributing agricultural land ownership, regulating sharecropping relationships, and distributing homestead plots.

=== Operation Barga ===
In the first term of Left Front government, one of the main key priorities were land redistribution and the most effective was Operation Barga. Introduced in 1978, it was a comprehensive and radical measure for land reforms which was further formalised through two legislation in 1979 and 1980. The operation sough to actively identify and record bargardars (trans: sharecroppers) by present occupational status without any reliance on ancestral records, producing official documentation for enforcement of the rights of bargardars to crop share from landlords and priority rights to lands in cases of both voluntary sale of land and forced sale of ceiling surplus lands. The effects of Operation Barga included:

- The number of recorded bargardars increased from 0.4 to 1.2 million by 1982, and resulted in the coverage of 50%+ output share concessions towards bargardars to increase from 10% to over 50% among registered bargardars and over 33% for unregistered bargardars.
- The number of landless rural households decreased by 35% during this period.
- Through Operation Barga, more than 1.39 million acres of land was acquired by the government and about 1.1 million acres of land was distributed among 2.54 million relatively land-poor households including 1.4 million share-croppers and 3.04 lakh poor peasants of the state. This counts about 8% of arable land and 34% of agricultural households. About 800,000 acres of land were distributed to 1.5 million heads of households between 1978 and 1982.
- Between 1977 and 1980, the Government oversaw the identification of nearly 1 million acres of ceiling surplus land and its subsequent redistribution.
- The implementation of the operation is noted to have improved the social status, dignity and prestige that was unheard of in the previous political regime. From 1978 to 1988 gram panchayats, the representation of bargadars, landless labourers and cultivators (with landholding of below 3 acres) increased from 1.8% to 11.3%, from 4.8% to 16.8% and from 21.8% to 30.2%. This also gave security and decision-making power to the poor and the bargadars.
- In addition it accounted for approximately 36% of agricultural growth during the period as a consequence of greater production incentives due to a lack of eviction threat and increased output stake.
- The operation is also credited to have created a cushion against farmers' suicides in West Bengal by improving the economic stability of farmers and decreasing economic inequality.

West Bengal accounted for 20% of total land redistribution in the country even though it accounts just 3.5% of total Indian land. Up to the year 2000, 1.6 million bargadars have been officially recorded as 86% of sharecroppers existing in the state. Also about a third of total cultivators in the state have been recorded as bargadars. Almost 9,00,000 bargadars were recorded between 1978 and 1988. But between 1988 and 1997 the process slowed down coming to less than 90,000 bargadars. As of September 1999, nearly 296,000, households had benefited by receiving homestead.

=== Patta land ===
One of further successful land redistribution was done by pattas. Land has been redistributed among 2.745 million 'pattadars'. Barga and patta both had covered 41.3% of the rural population of West Bengal. The state alone accounted for 47% of all India beneficiaries. Between 1993 and 1999 around 95,000 acres were given to pattadars. 6.25 lakh joint patta and 1.65 lakh female patta have been distributed.

=== Major land reforms, acts and timeline ===
There were numerous acts with a number of significant amendments from the LF Government. Some of them are,

- West Bengal Town and Country (Planning & Development) Act, 1979
- West Bengal Land Reform (Amendment) Act 1981
- The West Bengal Inland Fisheries Act, 1984
- West Bengal Thika Tenancy (Acquisition and Regulation) Act, 2001
- East Kolkata Wetlands (Conservation and Management) Act, 2006

In the 1990s, the land reforms process slowed down. Those who were given land or cultivation rights through land reforms could not hold it because of rising input prices and falling output prices (see Agriculture, 1990s) resulting difficulty in cultivation. As a result, 13.23% of pattadars and 14.37% of bargadars gave up their cultivation rights or had lost their land. The number of landless rural households was also increasing throughout the 1990s, i.e. from 39.6% in 1987–88 to 41.6% in 1999–2000. Small cultivators faced more land loss specially in regions where large-scale operation was the most profitable. In 1999–2000, rural-urban inequality increased more precisely. The village consumption per capita was 52% of per capita urban consumption in West Bengal compared to 56% as of all India and nearly 80% of agriculturally advanced states like Punjab, Haryana.

Land reform stats (up to 2001)
Ceiling-Surplus Reform
Declared surplus land	1.37 million acres
Vested surplus land	1.28 million acres
Redistributed ceiling-surplus land	1.04 million acres (7.8% of arable land)
Households to receive ceiling surplus land	2.54 million
Tenancy Reform
Land covered by tenancy reform	1.1 million acres
Tenancy beneficiaries	1.49 million
Total Beneficiaries Under All Reforms
Households receiving homestead plots	296,000
Total beneficiary households under ceiling surplus, tenancy, and homestead plots	Up to 4,316,000 (58.6% of agric. households)

Irrigated area expanded from 32% to about 70% from 1977 to 2006. Up to 2006, Scheduled Caste beneficiaries in West Bengal were 1.04 million (49.5% of all India) and Scheduled Tribe beneficiaries in West Bengal were 0.53 million (62% of All India).

Up to 2011, homestead land has been distributed to over 3.24 lakh landless labourers. In the 7th term (2006–2011), Left Front government brought land from willing farmers at a price 25% higher than the market price and redistributed them. 739.37 acres of land were purchased and redistributed to 5476 poor and landless families in the rural areas.

=== Agriculture ===
==== 1977–1990 ====
In the earlier terms of LF Government, agricultural production, grew at a spectacular rate, specially in the 1980s. West Bengal emerged as the largest rice producing state in India contributing more than 15 per cent of national production. The agricultural growth jumped from an annual average of 0.6% between 1970–1980 to over 7% between 1980 and 1990. In the 80s, West Bengal moved from being a food importer to a food exporter and became the largest producer of rice outstripping the states of Andhra Pradesh and Punjab which had previously held the status. During the 1980s, overall foodgrains had a growth rate of 5.81%, which was only 0.96% in 1979.

==== Boro cultivation ====
Left Front introduced high yielding boro rice cultivation. Boro was an extremely labour-intensive form of rice cultivation carried on by small cultivators in small plots of land using mainly family labour. Due to land reforms and Operations Barga, Boro cultivation was successful among farmers. This gave advantage to the farmers by raising more than one crop in a given year. Also the requisite water for boro cultivation was available from minor irrigations like shallow tube well. During the 1980s boro cultivation grew at an average annual rate of 12 per cent. Total factor productivity growth for the period was more rapid in West Bengal (3.93% annually) than in any other major Indian state.

==== 1990–2009 ====
The agricultural growth significantly slowed down in the 1990s due to a number of reasons. Boro cultivation could not be expanded due to unavailability of water and stopped. Demand and productivity both did not increased and West Bengal failed to export its rice to other states and abroad due to poor marketing strategies. Foodgrains input prices increased but the profit was less. Growthrate of foodgrain decreased to 2.13% in 1994. As a result, the percentage of cultivators in the rural workforce in 1991 fell from 38% in 1991 to 25.4% in 2001. At the same time, growth of boro cultivation slowed down to 5 per cent. The overall agricultural growth became around 2% in the 1990s.

Despite overall agricultural slowdown in the 1990s, 2000s were more competitively more better. During the 7th LF government, agriculture has grown at 3.1% in West Bengal from 2006–07 to 2009–10, compared to only 2.1% at the national level. West Bengal produced 14.3 million tons of rice in 2009–10, which was the highest for any state in the country, accounting for 16% of all-India production.

Types of occupational in field of agriculture in Rural West Bengal (1991)
Type of work	1991	2001
Cultivator	38.4%	25.4%
Agri worker	32.3%	33%
Non-agri worker	29.3%	41.6%

In 2006, the index of cropping intensity in West Bengal was 180, the second highest in India. The area under high yielding seeds increased from 28% to 96%. About 83% of the gross cropped area consisted different types of high yielding crops. West Bengal became also the first among all states in the production of vegetables (12.8 million tons in 2009–10). The LF government spent Rs. 400 crore to procure potatoes at an assured price of Rs. 3.50 per kg to prevent the losses of potato growers.

== Political reforms ==
=== Panchayat raj ===
"Democratic decentralisation" of rural power has been one of the most prominent achievements of the Left Front in West Bengal. Left Front and Jyoti Basu are credited to have been successful in the introduction of grassroots democracy and self governing units in West Bengal which substantially improved bureaucratic transparency, irrigation work, rural infrastructure and political participation and as a result standards of living.

The Left Front government amended and implemented the provisions of the Panchayat Act. On 4 June 1978, local body elections were resumed after 14 years and the first direct elections were held to elect 56,000 representatives from 15 zila parishads, 324 panchayat samitis and 3,242 gram panchayats in West Bengal. On 4 June 1978 three-tier panchayat local bodies were elected across the state, by elections in which the Left Front won a landslide victory. By 1993, the number of representatives was expanded to over 71,000 representatives.

Other efforts of taken during successive Left Front Governments was:

- Woman reservation was extended up to 50% from 33%.
- Around 35% of Government expanditure was done through the three-tier panchayat system.
- The Gram Sangsad was formed in 1992 to ensure people's participation in the panchayat system.
- Panchayat system helped to extend the rural infrastructure.

=== Other political developments ===
Seeing distribution of central government funds as unjust and politicized, the Left Front government began measures to pressure the central government to change its approach towards the state governments. These movements eventually resulted in the Sarkaria Commission.

The Left Front government was also credited with coping with the refugee situation created by the Bangladesh Liberation War and severe floods.

== Industry ==
=== Overall ===
West Bengal had its major industries in Kolkata, Durgapur, Howrah, Hooghly, Bakreshwar and the mineral-rich western highlands. From 1977, Left Front's industrial policy focused on small companies and thus bigger industries suffered until 1994 when again an industrial policy was announced but based on economic liberalization. This policy revamped the major industries in the 2000s.

Overall industrial stats
Parameters	Year-wise percentage				Ref(s)
Share in (organised) industrial production in India	1980–1981	1989–1990	1997–1998	2007–2008	
Share in (organised) industrial production in India	11.53%	5.79% (▼5.74%)	5.10% (▼0.69%)	3.90% (▼1.20%)	
Share in (organised) industrial employment in India	1977–1978	1997–1998	2001–2002	2007–2008	
Share in (organised) industrial employment in India	–	8.30%	7.00% (▼1.30%)	4.90% (▼2.10%)	

=== 1977–1993 ===
Total Investment projects implemented
1977–1981	₹1737.6 million
1982–1988	₹7740.1 million

After coming to power, the Left Front government announced industrial policy of in 1978 which gave high priority to small scale Industries and cottage industries to generate employment in industry and curtailed the monopoly power of big business companies, specially the multi-nationals in the organized sector. The Government declared than no new investment by multi-nationals would be allowed in the state. For an industrial rejuvenation in the state, LF government came up with a four-point demand from the center: "(i) more licenses should be granted for investment in the private sector in the state; (ii) government investment in the public sector should be increased; (iii) fund allocated for development in the state should be increased; and (iv) a host of regulations hindering establishment of new industries in the state should be relaxed". Jyoti Basu even made efforts to mobilize non-Congress chief ministers from a number of other states, to put collective pressure on the government at the center, but with no success.

In this period, industrial parameters steadily grew down. But Left's industrial policies was not the only cause of this industrial downfall. The other major causes for industries growing down in this period were:

- Until 1990, state's major industrial control was under the Central Government. States where the political party in Government was aligned with the central government took the maximum benefit of this pro-business attitudinal change. West Bengal having non-aligned LF Government did not much importance and big industries were started to be taken away to other states. The contradicting Congress-led central government at that time delayed new projects in the state like the for the clearance of making thermal power plant in Bakreshwar, the state had to wait seven years fue to procrastination at the center. West Bengal got a "relief from centre's control" after the economic reforms of 1991. By 1991, the economy had suffered major losses due to issues beyond the state's control.
- Industrialists did not show interest in starting new business in the state because of the militant trade unionism in the industry, which was primarily supported by the 1960s United Front government. There were 894 instances in 1969 and 340 instances in 1971 of work stoppage due to industrial disputes. In 1977 there were 397 instances of work stoppage happened in which 206 were strikes and the remaining 191 were lockouts. In the successive Governments Left Front government stopped supporting militant labor movements. It began to promote bilateral negotiations between labor and the management avoiding confrontation. Following the years the total number of major industrial disputes came down to 208 (78 strikes and 130 lockouts) in 1980 and 213 (21 strikes, 192 lockouts) in 1991. Though numerous factories suffered for this and have either closed down or have laid off a large number of workers.
- During the 1980s due to the central Government, massive retrenchment of labor happened in organized industry all across the country in which West Bengal lost 177,000 in the 80s but created only 91,000 new jobs after the reform in 90s.
- Production cost was higher than other states.

Parameters	Year-wise percentage				Ref(s)
Production cost per ₹1,000 of Gross Output	1976–1977	1980–1981	1985–1986	1989–1990	
Production cost per ₹1,000 of Gross Output	₹843	₹877 (▲₹34)	₹925 (▲₹48)	₹941 (▲₹16)	

- Another cause was managerial incompetence. Companies like Kesoram Cotton Mills and Metal Box, Hind Motors have closed for this reason.
- Due to Central Government's freight equalisation scheme coal and other natural resources were carried at equivalent prices across the country. Many industries were shifted out to other parts of India from West Bengal.

Parameters	Year-wise percentage (1977–1993)				Ref(s)
Share of West Bengal in the ex factory value of (organised) industrial output	1977–1978	1980–1981	1987–1988	1990–1992	
Share of West Bengal in the ex factory value of (organised) industrial output	10.5%	9.8% (▼0.7%)	7.2% (▼2.6%)	6.0% (▼1.2%)	

In many cases, experienced displaced workers started their own factories in small sheds. These small entrepreneurs have emerged as sub-contractors of bigger factories from which they had been laid off. As a result, numerous small industrial establishments came in the unorganized sector. This led to the solution of employment problem but overall the economic condition of industrial workers became deteriorated. In the 1990s, West Bengal had turned into a small-scale, production-dominated economical state, most of these units were unregistered. The share of unregistered manufacturing in the manufacturing state domestic product (SDP) of the state almost gone to 60% in the 1990s from an average of 30% in the 1980s. 89.2% of total industrial employment was generated by the small scale industries compared to Gujarat, Maharashtra and all India who stood at 70.07%, 67.3% and 81.12%. The number of informal sector manufacturing units also increased, specially in the rural areas. Most of them did not have any well-defined property live on illegally encroached government or railway land or pavements of city streets to sell their ware. But due to poor quality, untimely delivery and sales services the local and small scale industries never grow or compete at the national level. Though in 1981–87, growth rate of manufacturing was below 2 per cent, it grew to above 3 per cent during 1987–94. Jessop & Company, Braithwaite, Burn & Company, Indian Standard Wagon, GKW (then Guest Keen Williams) and Metal Box were some companies who were very much affected. Workers were paid only minimum wages.

In 1978 while amounts of per capita industrial investment in private sector were ₹670 for all-India, and ₹428 in West Bengal, in 1994 the figures stood at ₹9,177 for all-India, and ₹4,376 in West Bengal, compared to ₹22,776 in Gujarat, ₹12,385 in Maharashtra. Though new companies were created at this period like Shree Cement (1979), Balrampur Chini Mills (1979), Orient Cement (1979), Skiper Limited (1981), Century Plyboard (1982), Kolpona Industries (1985), Haldia Petrochemicals(1985), Himadri Chemical And Industry (1987), Magma Finkorp (1988), Tata Metalics (1990) etc.

Number of registered (organised) factories in various types of Industries in West Bengal (1977–1993)
Type of industries	1977	1980	1986	1990
Tea	261	266	273	278
Cotton Textiles	255	275	293	305
Jute Mills	74	73	77	78
Chemical Products	350	390	501	533
Iron & Steel	4	4	N.A.	N.A.
Engineering Industries	2663	2971	3667	4149
Total	5837	6421	8064	8960

Though, the employment problem was solved due to both of the organised and unorganised sectors.

Workers employed per year (1977–1993)
Type of industries	1977	1980	1986	1990
Tea	23,840	26,606	26,612	24,923
Cotton Textiles	52,161	55,206	55,930	45,815
Jute Mills	230,187	244,052	242,900	222,214
Chemical Products	31,485	34,201	35,961	34,147
Iron & Steel	40,632	41,328	NA	NA
Engineering Industries	318,439	334,738	350,766	360,610
Total	826,000	875,000	901,000	881,000

The per capita net state domestic product (NSDP) declined to 7th in 1990-91 having 6th in 1980–81.

=== 1994–2000 ===
In 1994 the LF government announced a new industrial policy based on economic liberalization. In the new industrial policy, the LF Government declared that it would welcome foreign multi-national investment and technology. Priority was given to both public and private investment (domestic and foreign) in industry. Private investment was to be allowed in the power sector, in some important sectors within manufacturing projects were to be launched as public-private joint ventures. Improvement and upgrading of industrial infrastructure would be indispensable. The government had also given special attention to "petrochemicals and downstream industries, electronics and information technology, iron, steel, metallurgical and engineering, textiles, leather and leather products, food processing, medicinal plants, rubber, palm oil and tea, manufacture of basic drugs, chemicals and pharmaceuticals, minerals and mine based industries, gems, jewellery and promotion of tourism and tourism related activities". The Left Front government made a deliberate effort to project itself as a 'business friendly' Government. The new industrial policy of 1994 was acclaimed as much pro-industry and it was more practically implemented and turned more favourable towards industrialisation during Buddhadeb Bhattacharjee's chief ministerial rule.

In this period many major industrial changes took place. West Bengal Industrial Development Corporation was established. Promotional campaigns were undertaken in collaboration with various Chambers of Commerce and industries. Mitsubishi and Chatterjee Soros Fund Management from abroad and Tata Group within the country collaborated with the state in a public-private joint venture at the Haldia Petro Chemical Project successfully. In 1991–2001, ₹197752.0 million were implemented in industrial projects.

After 1991, the Central Government gave much control to the state government. After 1991, industries which are exempt from industrial licensing, had to file an Industrial Entrepreneur Memoranda (IEM) with Secretariat of Industrial Approvals (SIA). Between August 1991 and October 2006, 3844 IEMs are proposed with an investment amount of ₹85,968 Crores, in which 475 IEMs were really implemented with an investment amount of ₹28,963 Crores. West Bengal did comparatively better at implementation than other states. But despite the industrial policies, West Bengal only attracted only 4.73% of all applications for investment in the private sector in the period of 1991 to 2003, the share of proposed investment was even lower at 3.85%, in which 35.4% of the planned investment was actually implemented, compared to Maharashtra and Gujarat which attracted one third of the whole investment and 55% was implemented in Gujarat. Over the period August 1991 – January 2003, per capita investment in the private sector was ₹1952 in West Bengal compared to ₹20,725 in Gujarat. Again one of the main causes of no industries coming to state was militant unionism, which was still higher than other states. Also production cost per ₹1000 of gross output was still much higher, which was ₹883 in 1994–1995 compared to Gujrat, Maharashtra and Tamil Nadu having ₹818, ₹820 and ₹827 as costs.

Parameters	Year-wise percentage		Ref(s)
Production cost per ₹1,000 of Gross Output	1994–1995	1999–2000	
Production cost per ₹1,000 of Gross Output	₹883	₹878 (▼₹05)	

The manufacturing growth started to increase in the 1990s and stood at 6.75% compared to 4.24% in the 1980s, which is the second highest growth rate in the 1990s, only next to Karnataka.

=== Industrialisation drive in 2000s ===
The economic decline stopped in 2000–2001. After 2003, industries in the state started to come up in much higher pace and West Bengal became rapidly competitive with Gujarat and Tamil Nadu. The state saw a re-emergence of manufacturing sector that was declining through the 80s and 90s. West Bengal only accounted 3.8 per cent of the total number of industrial appeals implemented in India in 1992–1999 which increased to 12.2 per cent in 2000–2004 due to new scheme of incentives announced in 2000, replacing the old schemes of 1993 and 1999. About 24 lakhs jobs were created during 2005–2011, in West Bengal, highest in India at that time, while Gujarat only created 14.9 lakh jobs. West Bengal had 12% industrial growth, highest in India at that time. The credit of the mass industrial shift was mostly gone to the then Industry minister Nirupam Sen and chief minister Buddhadeb Bhattacharjee.

In 2006, chief minister Buddhadeb Bhattacharjee announced, the government has ensured industrial investment of Rs 6,000 crore for 2006. Before that in 2002–2005 ₹86400.5 million industrial projects were iimplemented. Between 2006 and 2010, over Rs. 36000 crore was spent to materialize 1313 large and medium industrial units. Production cost per Rs.1000 of gross output came down to ₹794, compared to Gujrat which was at ₹810.

Parameters	Year-wise percentage			Ref(s)
Production cost per ₹1,000 of Gross Output	2002–2003	2005–2006	2008–2009	
Production cost per ₹1,000 of Gross Output	₹860	₹607 (▼₹253)	₹794 (▲₹187)	

The industrial drive resulted:

- The industrialization drive created direct employment opportunities for 1.41 lakh people. 322 units were materialized in 2010, 80% of which were medium scale enterprises.
- Employment at the IT sector expanded from 32000 in 2006 to 105000 in 2010.
- The number of new small-scale units in the state has increased from 19884 in 2010 to 23000 in 2011 making employment opportunities for 2.2 lakh persons.
- The state saw about Rs 5,000 crore worth of FDI per year, the third highest after Maharashtra and Tamil Nadu.

Left Front Government ensured investment of Rs 10 billion for the modernisation of IISCO steel plant. The sevent LF Government aimed revival of Bengal Chemicals, Gluconate, Infusion India, as well as the fertilizer industry and the Mining and Allied Machinery Corporation. In addition to this, many big industrialization projects were planned and many were executed, though some of them were pulled off. Some of the notable are:

- Japanese company Mitsubishi Chemical Corporation built purified terephthalic acid (PTA) PTA plant at Haldia in April 2000, with an investment of 1475 crore, which was the single-largest Japanese foreign direct investment (FDI) then. In 2006, the plant doubled its production capacity last year, with more investment of Rs 1,450 crore. In 2005, MCC also decided to invest Rs 1,665 crore for setting up another PTA plant in West Bengal. The two plants would slated to produce 12.7 million tonnes of main raw material for polyester annually.
- Tata group started ₹1 lakh small cars project. The project started executing but resulted pulling out due to Tata Nano Singur controversy.
- The LF Government had an agreement with Indonesia's largest conglomerate Salim Group in 2006, after chiefs minister's visit to Indonesia in 2005. The Salim Group-promoted New Kolkata International Development Pvt Ltd agreed to build a multi-product and chemical lab on an area of about 9,000 hectares in Nandigram SEZ with an investment of Rs 48,000 crore, which is largest investment project in the state ever. The project was not successful due to mass protests followed by Nandigram violence and Maoist insurgency.
- The consumer electronics and home appliances gaint Videocon group had decided to invest to create IT and bio-tech special economic zone (SEZ) in Siliguri as a joint venture with a Thailand-based firm. LF Government allocated 100 acres plot for the SEZ project.
- Jindal Steel agreed to invest ₹35,000 crore in coal-mining and making steel plants and power generating units. Though the project was drafted in February 2007, the project was planned in a 4500-acre area of Shalboni, which was a Maoist-operated area. Due to Maoist insurgency in that area and global economic meltdown, the project got held up to March 2010.
- In October 2007, Videocon group decided to invest 15,000–20,000 crore to make 3-million tone steel plant and 12000 MW thermal power plant at Jamuria over a land of 1,800 to 2,000 acres.

Though, after the change of the Government in 2011, many industrial projects stopped and were pulled of. Videocon pulled off its Jalpaiguri SEZ project in 2012 stating "latest business outlook of the region" as a cause. Videocon's steel plant and power plant project was also pulled off in 2013 due to problems regarding to coal linkage and Government's interdiction in land acquisition for industrial projects.

== Economy, poverty and employment ==
The state was primarily dependent on agriculture and industry. In 2006, the GDP of the state (at $23 billion or Rs 2,300 crore) stood as the third highest in the country. The per capita growth is second only to Karnataka at 5.4 per cent. West Bengal also has the second highest compounded average growth rate in the country – 5.49 per cent against a national average of 4.41 per cent. During the last LF Government, the state's OTR to GSDP share was between 4.22–4.59% which, according to this CAG report, was "lower than the target of 6.8 percent recommended by the 12th Finance Commission". The state's gross fiscal deficit as a percentage of the GSDP was 4.2% in 2010–11. The GSDP growth rate at 2011–12 was 4.17 percent. In the 2010–11, during the 7th LF Government, Bengal's debt-GDSP ratio stood at its peak in 2010–11 at 41.9 percent, as per IIM Calcutta conducted survey, which was the highest in the country. According to the ranking of states' per capita income at current prices, West Bengal's rank was 15th in 2011. Bengal's revenue deficit as a percentage of the GSDP was 3.75 percent in 2010–11. Debt to revenue receipt ratio came down to 396.47 percent in 2010–11. The share of social service sector expenditure in the state's total expenditure was 9.8 percent in 2010–11. Share of capital expenditure as a percentage of total expenditure was 3.61 percent in 2010–11. West Bengal stood below the national average with respect to per capita consumption, housing, electrification, per capita consumption of electricity and poverty. In 1980–81 per capita income of West Bengal was 51 per cent of that of Kolkata, in 2000–01 it has gone down to 48.3 per cent. West Bengal State Domestic Product consisted of 31% in Agriculture, 4% in Fishery, 4% in Const, 26% in Services, 14% in Manufacturing, 14% in Trade and business and 7% in others. The share of the primary sector in the State Domestic Product declined from 32.9 per cent in 1999–2000 to 26.9 per cent in 2005–06. The share of the secondary sector increased from 14.8 per cent to 16.9 per cent. The share of the tertiary sector grew from 52.3 per cent to 56.2 per cent. This showed a shift from agriculture and rural manufacturing to low-quality employment in urban and rural areas. From 1999 to 2005, the annual rate of growth (%) of employment was 3.63 in agriculture, 2.72 in Mining and quarrying, 1.53 in Manufacturing, -9.22 in electricity and water, 9.75 in construction, 3.6 in Trade, hotels and restaurants, 3.63 in transport and 3.3 in labour force.

In 2001, West Bengal was a population of 80.2 million and a population density of 904 persons per square kilometer and the most densely populated. Agriculture is the mainstay for the majority of the population, comprises the largest sector of the economy, and utilizes the great majority of the state's land. Seventy-two percent of the states' population lives in rural areas and 53% of the labor force is engaged in agricultural production. Agriculture generates 31% of the state domestic product. The quintile distribution of rural per capita income in West Bengal in 1993–94 was lower than the all India level. In 1997–1998 state's total debt/GSDP was 22.97.

Share of investment in public sector in India	1970–1979	1980–1989	1990–1999	2007–2008
Share of investment in public sector in India	10.7%	10.5% (▼1.30%)	– (▼)	10.46% (▲)

Parameters	1990–1991	1998–1999	Ref(s)
Total liabilities/Revenue receipts	191.53	304.86	
Interest payments/revenue receipts	15.46	31.82	

Poverty in West Bengal decreased heavily during the Left Front rule. The decreasing was the largest after Kerala.

Parameters	1983–1984	1993–1994	1999–2000	2004–2005	Ref(s)
Poverty ratio (in percentage)	32.32	22.41 (▼9.91)	14.86 (▼7.55)	11.20 (▼3.66)	
Poverty line (in Rs)	105.91	247.53 (▲141.62)	409.22 (▲161.69)	449.32 (▲40.1)	

Parameters	1983	1993	2000	2011	Ref(s)
Urban-Rural Per Capita Consumption Ratio in West Bengal	1.60	1.70	1.90		

== Infrastructure ==
During the premitive Left Front tenures, the physical infrastructure downgraded. West Bengal ranked 8th in 1970–71, 9th in 1980–81 and 17 in 1990–91 which was only ahead of one state Assam.

=== Power and electricity ===
In the 90s, West Bengal was below the national average with respect to per capita consumption, housing, electrification, per capita consumption of electricity.

== Education ==
The literacy rate in West Bengal jumped from 38% in 1977 to 68% in 2001 and 74% in 2011. 14 new universities, more than 200 new degree colleges and engineering colleges (while 5 new universities, 73 new degree colleges and 36 new engineering colleges were established under the 7th LF government) were established throughout LF successive governments. Net enrolment ratio in primary education reached 98.95% in 2009–10. Drop-out rate declined to 8.66% in 2009–10 which was below national average.

== Healthcare ==
During the successive LF Governments, parameters of healthcare differed and were average in results. After 1977, LF tried to initiate the Chinese barefoot doctor model in the state. But, the project met with resistance and had to be abandoned. Then they tried to build a three-tier health service system for the rural areas. The doctors would be placed in the primary, subsidiary and the sub-divisional or district hospitals and the state-run medical college hospitals would act as referral hospitals. Budgets were allocated and some sort of infrastructure was built up. But, the LF government failed to post doctors in the rural areas. Overall, the healthcare saw a degradation, until 1987, when CPI(M) leader Prasanta Sur took office as health minister and reformed the ministry. Before that there had been several cases of death and mutilation of new born babies by dogs and cats. Basic services are not available in most rural hospitals for want of doctors. According to state government figures, of the 40,000 registered medical practitioners, 69% are located in urban areas though 73% of the population lives in rural areas. Even the drug control administration was in shambles. Licence were issued to unscientific and banned drugs. According to Jana Swap, the joint secretary of the Health Services Association, numerous drug companies dealt with the doctors' unions which are affiliated to the party and resulted uninterrupted trade of unscientific, irrational and even banned drug formulations in pharmaceutical markets.

There were some notable achievements during LF term in healthcare:

- At the end of 2009, 73% of all patients in West Bengal undergo treatment from the public health system, compared to national average of 40%.
- The decline in infant mortality rate in West Bengal was the second fastest in the country.
- The 7th LF government created health insurance schemes, benefiting 25 lakh workers in the unorganized sector from 56 categories and professions.

== Other indexes ==
- The Human Development Index was noted to have improved at a much faster rate than in other states, growing from being the lowest in the country in 1975 to above the national average in 1990.
- The death rate in West Bengal stood at 6.2 in 2009, which was the lowest among all states in the country.
- Annual population growth rate in West Bengal reduced from 1.77% between 1991–2001 to 1.39% between 2001 and 2011, which was the fourth lowest in the country at that time. Child sex ratio in West Bengal at 950 in 2011 was the second highest in the country.
- Food subsidy was increased by Rs. 434 crore to provide cheap rice to the poor.
- LF Government started supplying rice at Rs. 2 per kg from March 2009 and provided rice to 2.65 crore poor in the state. Rice offtake from the ration shops increased to 96% in 2011. Sugar, edible oil and pulses were also supplied through the PDS at prices 10% lower than market prices during the festival time.
