= Sushil Barman =

Indian politician

Member of the West Bengal Legislative Assembly
- In office 2 May 2021 – 4 May 2026
- Preceded by: Binay Krishna Barman
- Succeeded by: Nisith Pramanik
- Constituency: Mathabhanga

Personal details
- Born: 10 July 1968 (age 58) Mathabhanga, West Bengal
- Party: Bharatiya Janata Party
- Education: Mathabhanga College
- Profession: Politician

Sushil Barman is an Indian politician from BJP. In May 2021, he was elected as the member of the West Bengal Legislative Assembly from Mathabhanga. {{Election box begin|title=2026 West Bengal Legislative Assembly election: Mathabhanga (SC)

== Career ==
Barman is from Ghoksadanga, Mathabhanga, Cooch Behar district. His father's name is Keshari Mohan Barman. He passed H.S. Pass from Mathabhanga College, in 1988. He contested 2021 West Bengal Legislative Assembly election from Mathabhanga Vidhan Sabha and won the seat on 2 May 2021.
