= Politics of West Bengal =

Overview of the political landscape, history, and governance of West Bengal, India

- Emblem of India
- Polity type: Unitary parliamentary constitutional democracy
- Constitution: Constitution of India

Legislative branch
- Name: West Bengal Legislative Assembly
- Type: Unicameral
- Meeting place: Writers' Buildings, Kolkata
- Lower house
- Name: Vidhan Sabha
- Presiding officer: Rathindra Bose, Speaker of the West Bengal Legislative Assembly

Executive branch
- Head of state
- Title: Governor
- Currently: R. N. Ravi
- Appointer: President of India
- Head of government
- Title: Chief Minister
- Currently: Suvendu Adhikari
- Appointer: Governor
- Cabinet
- Name: West Bengal Council of Ministers
- Current cabinet: Adhikari ministry
- Leader: Chief Minister
- Appointer: Governor

Judicial branch
- Name: Calcutta High Court

Politics of West Bengal refers to the political landscape, history, and governance of the state of West Bengal in eastern India. West Bengal has one of the most politically active and contested electoral histories in the country, shaped by over three decades of Left Front rule, fifteen years of All India Trinamool Congress (AITC) governance under Mamata Banerjee, and the historic 2026 victory of the Bharatiya Janata Party (BJP), which ended AITC's rule and made the BJP the first right-wing party to govern the state.

== Overview ==
West Bengal is a unicameral legislature state governed through the West Bengal Legislative Assembly, which has 294 seats. The state sends 42 members to the Lok Sabha (lower house of the Parliament of India) and 16 members to the Rajya Sabha (upper house). The state capital, Kolkata, serves as the seat of government and has historically been a major centre of political thought, trade unionism, and intellectual activism in India.

As of 2026, the ruling party is the Bharatiya Janata Party (BJP) under Chief Minister Suvendu Adhikari, who assumed office on 1 June 2026 following the BJP's landslide victory in the 2026 West Bengal Legislative Assembly election.

== Historical background ==
=== Colonial era and independence movement ===
The political consciousness of Bengal dates to the British colonial period. Bengal was the epicentre of the Indian independence movement, home to figures such as Subhas Chandra Bose, Rabindranath Tagore, and Bipin Chandra Pal. The Partition of Bengal (1905) by Lord Curzon galvanised mass political mobilisation and gave rise to the Swadeshi movement. The 1947 Partition resulted in massive refugee influxes into West Bengal, shaping its demographic and political character for decades.

=== Congress dominance (1947–1967) ===
After independence in 1947, the Indian National Congress held political power in West Bengal. The period was marked by refugee crises and the early spread of communist ideology among factory workers and peasants in the industrial belt around Kolkata.

=== Left Front era (1977–2011) ===
The Left Front, led by the Communist Party of India (Marxist) (CPI(M)), came to power in 1977 under Chief Minister Jyoti Basu and ruled West Bengal for 34 consecutive years — the longest uninterrupted tenure of any democratically elected communist government in the world.

Key milestones include:

- Operation Barga (1978): A landmark land reform programme that registered sharecroppers, securing their rights.
- Panchayati Raj: Decentralisation of power to village-level governance, strengthening grassroots participation.
- Singur–Nandigram crisis (2007–08): The Left Front government's push for industrialisation through land acquisition led to violent protests at Singur (Tata Nano plant) and Nandigram, severely eroding its support base.

Chief Ministers during this period:

Chief Minister	Tenure
Jyoti Basu	1977–2000
Buddhadeb Bhattacharjee	2000–2011

=== Trinamool Congress era (2011–2026) ===
The All India Trinamool Congress (AITC), founded by Mamata Banerjee in 1998, swept to power in the 2011 West Bengal Legislative Assembly election, ending 34 years of Left Front rule. Mamata Banerjee became the first woman Chief Minister of West Bengal.

AITC retained power in 2016 and 2021. However, growing anti-incumbency, concerns over law and order, the RG Kar Medical College rape and murder case (2024), corruption allegations, and Hindu consolidation created conditions for the BJP's 2026 breakthrough.

=== BJP era (2026–present) ===
In the 2026 West Bengal Legislative Assembly election, held on 23 and 29 April 2026, the BJP won a historic landslide with 207 of 294 seats and a 46% vote share, ending AITC's 15-year rule. The AITC was reduced to 80 seats. Suvendu Adhikari was sworn in as Chief Minister on 9 May 2026, with the full cabinet sworn in on 1 June 2026. This made the BJP the first right-wing party ever to form a government in West Bengal.

== Major political parties ==
Party	Abbreviation	Ideology	Current Status (2026)
Bharatiya Janata Party	BJP	Hindu nationalism, conservatism	Ruling party (2026–present)
Mamata All India Trinamool Congress	MAITC / MTMC	Populism, Bengali sub-nationalism	Principal opposition
Communist Party of India (Marxist)	CPI(M)	Marxism–Leninism	Marginalised; part of Left Front
Indian National Congress	INC	Social democracy, centrism	Minor presence
Indian Secular Front	ISF	Minority rights, secularism	Regional; South Bengal focus
All India Forward Bloc	AIFB	Socialism	Negligible presence
Democratic Trinamool Congress	DTC	new party formed after assembly elections 2026.	

== Electoral history ==
=== Legislative Assembly elections ===
Election Year	Winner	Seats Won	Chief Minister
1977	Left Front	231	Jyoti Basu
1982	Left Front	238	Jyoti Basu
1987	Left Front	251	Jyoti Basu
1991	Left Front	243	Jyoti Basu
1996	Left Front	203	Jyoti Basu
2001	Left Front	199	Buddhadeb Bhattacharjee
2006	Left Front	235	Buddhadeb Bhattacharjee
2011	AITC	184	Mamata Banerjee
2016	AITC	211	Mamata Banerjee
2021	AITC	215	Mamata Banerjee
2026	BJP	208	Suvendu Adhikari

=== 2026 West Bengal Legislative Assembly election ===
The 2026 election was held in two phases on 23 and 29 April 2026, with results declared on 4 May 2026. The BJP won 207 seats with a 46% vote share, while the AITC was reduced to 80 seats with 41% vote share. The election recorded a historic voter turnout of approximately 94%, the highest ever for any state assembly election in India. Suvendu Adhikari was sworn in as Chief Minister on 9 May 2026 at Raj Bhawan, Kolkata.

The election was marked by disputes over electoral rolls, allegations of voter roll irregularities under the Special Intensive Revision (SIR) drive, and post-election violence. A repoll was ordered in the Falta constituency on 21 May 2026, with results declared on 24 May 2026.

=== Lok Sabha representation ===
West Bengal elects 42 members to the Lok Sabha. In the 2024 Indian general election, the AITC won 29 seats and the BJP won 12 seats. With the BJP's 2026 state victory, the state's central political alignment has shifted significantly.

== Key political figures ==
=== Current figures ===
- Suvendu Adhikari — Chief Minister of West Bengal (since 9 May 2026); BJP leader; former AITC heavyweight who joined BJP in 2020; won from Bhabanipur in 2026, defeating Mamata Banerjee.
- Samik Bhattacharya — BJP West Bengal State President; Rajya Sabha member since 2024; key architect of the BJP's 2026 campaign.
- Rathindra Bose — Speaker of the 18th West Bengal Legislative Assembly (BJP); elected 14 May 2026.
- Mamata Banerjee — Leader of Opposition; founder and chairperson of AITC; Chief Minister of West Bengal 2011–2026; known as Didi.
- Sovandeb Chattopadhyay — Leader of Opposition in the 18th West Bengal Legislative Assembly (AITC).

=== Historical figures (post-independence) ===
- Jyoti Basu — Chief Minister 1977–2000; one of India's longest-serving Chief Ministers; declined the offer to become Prime Minister of India in 1996.
- Buddhadeb Bhattacharjee — Chief Minister 2000–2011; attempted industrial liberalisation; lost power due to the Singur–Nandigram unrest.
- Mamata Banerjee — Chief Minister 2011-2026; Only Women To hold the Office. Transferred Secretariat From Writers' Building to Nabanna (building).

== Key political issues ==
=== Post-poll violence ===
West Bengal has a documented history of post-election violence. The 2021 West Bengal post-poll violence drew national attention and led to NHRC intervention. The 2026 election was similarly marked by allegations of electoral malpractice and violence.

=== Electoral roll controversy (2026) ===
The Special Intensive Revision (SIR) of electoral rolls prior to the 2026 election was highly contested. Deletions were disproportionately high in Muslim-majority constituencies, which typically backed the AITC. The precise impact on electoral outcomes remains debated.

=== Central–state relations ===
Tension between the West Bengal state government and the Union Government was a recurring theme under the AITC regime, particularly around funds release under centrally sponsored schemes, CBI jurisdiction, and gubernatorial appointments. Under the BJP state government, these frictions are expected to reduce significantly.

=== Identity and minority politics ===
The state's large Matua community (Hindu refugees from Bangladesh) and significant Muslim minority (approximately 27% of the population) make identity politics and minority welfare central to electoral strategy. Hindu consolidation was a key factor in the BJP's 2026 sweep. The CAA and its implementation remain politically significant.

=== Law and order and corruption ===
The West Bengal School Service Commission recruitment scam, the Narada sting operation, and the RG Kar Medical College rape and murder case (2024) significantly damaged the AITC's image and contributed to its 2026 defeat.

== Governance structure ==
- Governor — Constitutional head, appointed by the President of India. Currently R. N. Ravi.
- Chief Minister — Head of elected government; exercises effective executive authority. Currently Suvendu Adhikari (BJP).
- Cabinet — Adhikari ministry; sworn in on 1 June 2026.
- Legislature — 18th West Bengal Legislative Assembly; Speaker: Rathindra Bose (BJP); Leader of Opposition: Ribrata Banerjee (AITC).
- Judiciary — Calcutta High Court is the apex court for the state, with jurisdiction also extending to Andaman and Nicobar Islands.

== See also ==
- Government of West Bengal
- West Bengal Legislative Assembly
- Chief Ministers of West Bengal
- 2026 West Bengal Legislative Assembly election
- All India Trinamool Congress
- Bharatiya Janata Party – West Bengal
- Elections in West Bengal
- Left Front (West Bengal)
