= Tapas Maity =

Indian politician (born 1980)

Member of the West Bengal Legislative Assembly
- Incumbent
- Assumed office 2026
- Preceded by: Kalyan Ghosh
- Constituency: Domjur

Personal details
- Born: 1980 (age 45–46)
- Party: All India Trinamool Congress (until 2026); Democratic Trinamool Congress (from 2026)
- Profession: Politician

Tapas Maity (born 1980) is an Indian politician from West Bengal. He is a member of the West Bengal Legislative Assembly from Domjur representing the Democratic Trinamool Congress.

== Early life and education ==
Maity was born to Sankar Maity. He is engaged in business activities and is also associated with social and political work. His spouse is engaged in business. He completed Higher Secondary education from the Board of Open Schooling and Skill Education in 2024.

== Political career ==
Maity won the Domjur seat in the 2026 West Bengal Legislative Assembly election as a candidate of the All India Trinamool Congress. He received 1,34,036 votes and defeated Gobinda Hazra of the Bharatiya Janata Party by a margin of 42,177 votes.
