= 2021 West Bengal post-poll violence =

2021 Post-poll violence in West Bengal, India

2021 Post-poll violence in West Bengal
- Part of Political unrest in West Bengal
- Date: 2 May 2021 – June 2021
- Location: West Bengal, India (notably North 24 Parganas, Birbhum, Cooch Behar, Kolkata, and other districts)
- Caused by: Political rivalry between All India Trinamool Congress (AITC) and Bharatiya Janata Party (BJP); Alleged electoral fraud and post-election retribution
- Methods: Rioting; Arson; Targeted violence; Looting; Intimidation; Bombing
- Status: Ongoing investigations
- Result: Calcutta High Court ordered a CBI investigation into incidents of post-poll violence; National Human Rights Commission (NHRC) reported lapses in law and order

Parties
| Supporters of Bharatiya Janata Party (BJP); Supporters of Indian National Congress (INC); Supporters of Communist Party of India (Marxist) (CPI(M)) | Supporters of All India Trinamool Congress (AITC) |

Lead figures
| Dilip Ghosh (BJP); Adhir Ranjan Chowdhury (INC); Surjya Kanta Mishra (CPI(M)) | Mamata Banerjee (Chief Minister of West Bengal, AITC) |

Number
| Unknown number of opposition supporters | Unknown number of TMC supporters |

Casualties
- Deaths: At least 62 confirmed deaths
- Injuries: Dozens reported; exact numbers unconfirmed
- Arrested: Multiple arrests made; exact numbers vary by district

Large scale post-poll violence erupted after the declaration of results of 2021 West Bengal Legislative Assembly election, where the Trinamool Congress, known as TMC or AITC, led by Mamata Banerjee, won defeating the Bharatiya Janata Party (BJP). Many BJP workers were killed by the perpetuators linked to the ruling TMC party, though some TMC workers also died. The violence also led to deaths and rapes of women, and many BJP workers' families were forced to flee the state.

The Calcutta High Court ordered to handover all the cases by NHRC to central agency, CBI for a court monitored investigation, due to ineffectiveness of ruling state government and the local police. Many women, including minor girls, were allegedly raped by TMC goons as their family members voted against them. The political rivalry between the ruling AITC (TMC) and the opposition BJP played a role in the violence. However, the BJP claimed that the violence was targeted against BJP workers and Hindu voters, due to Muslim appeasement policy of TMC.

In May 2026, after the BJP won the West Bengal elections and formed the state government, it reopened 59 cases related to violence against BJP workers following the 2021 Assembly polls, and many criminals linked to the TMC were arrested. Some Bengali actors said that they had wrongly supported TMC in 2021 on social media posts linked to post-poll violence, due to coercion and fear of TMC goons.

== Background ==
In June 2019, 2 All India Trinamool Congress (AITC) workers were killed in Bengal. The party had blamed Bhartiya Janta Party (BJP) for it.

Indian Home Minister and BJP member Amit Shah said that more than 300 BJP members were killed due to the political violence as of December 2020 and that "investigation in those cases hasn't moved an inch".

== Major violent incidents after the 2021 polls ==
Politically motivated violence in West Bengal took place since the 2021 West Bengal elections.

After the announcement of results of the 2021 West Bengal Legislative Assembly election, declaring that the incumbent All India Trinamool Congress government would be returning to power for the third time, violence broke out in some parts of West Bengal. In reality it was continuation of the violence which took place across the state during the election.

The BJP claimed that at least six of its workers were killed during attacks by workers of the ruling All India Trinamool Congress. Five AITC workers were also allegedly killed in these attacks. The governor summoned the Director of General Police and Kolkata Police Commissioner to discuss the situation. Congress leader Jitin Prasada alleged that Congress members were attacked and even women and children weren't spared from the attacks by AITC. He called out Mamata Banerjee to stop this violence immediately. Leaders of CPI (M) alleged that their workers had also been attacked by the AITC. In Khanakul, an AITC worker was reportedly hacked to death.

Union Ministry of Home Affairs sought a report from the Government of West Bengal over incidents of post-election brutality against opposition political workers in the state.

Udayan Guha, AITC candidate from Dinhata and former Dinhata MLA was attacked by miscreants in Dinhata on 6 May. Guha suffered a hand fracture and other injuries. AITC blamed BJP for this attack. FIR was lodged against 15 men and among them 4 were arrested by 10 May. Nearly one month after undergoing surgery, Guha returned to Dinhata from Kolkata. He questioned the role of the police, as those accused in the attack on him were still elusive.

On 5 May, after taking oath as the Chief Minister for a third term, Mamata Banerjee reinstated state police officers who were transferred by the Election Commission. On 10 May, a five-judge special bench of Calcutta High Court expressed satisfaction over the action taken by the newly formed Mamata Banerjee government in West Bengal to restore normality after post-results violence in pockets of the state.

Senior minister in Assam government Himanta Biswa Sarma claimed that hundreds of BJP worker's families had crossed the West Bengal-Assam border to seek shelter in Assam away from the violence against them. He called this violence as "ugly dance of Democracy".

Many women, including a minor girl, were allegedly raped by TMC workers as their family members voted against them. Allegedly, a 60-year-old woman was raped, and her daughter-in-law was beaten up by AITC goons; their account moved to the Supreme Court.

In September 2021, Manas Dhurjati Saha, BJP candidate from Magrahat Paschim who was allegedly beaten up by AITC workers and sustained serious head trauma died in hospital. The BJP demanded a CBI probe into the issue.

In May, a BJP worker had died due to Cardiac arrest and AITC workers helped his family cremate him but BJP workers did not even respond to help pleas. There were multiple other instances where after the natural death of BJP workers, AITC workers and leaders helped them to cremate or bury them respectfully.

In Bankra Mishra Para in Domjur, defector BJP workers were purified by sprinkling Ganga water in the presence of the All India Trinamool Congress MLA Kalyan Ghosh himself before joining AITC which attracted criticism from BJP. Another 200 members from BJP who had joined the party shortly before the elections rejoined the AITC claiming that "BJP wasn't on their side in the day of danger" and returned to their AITC.

In an organizational meeting of the BJP, two factions of the party clashed with each other in the presence of Dilip Ghosh and Sukanta Majumdar. The protesters alleged that the state BJP leadership did not come to their rescue when they were assaulted by AITC workers in post-poll violence.

As of April 2022, at least 303 BJP workers and local leaders who left Bengal in 2021 were yet to return to their homes. They were waiting for state's assurances before moving back.

== Casualties ==
- BJP's Claims: The BJP alleged that at least six of its workers were killed in post-poll violence, claiming that AITC supporters were behind the attacks. Several BJP workers were reportedly injured.
- AITC's Claims: The AITC, on the other hand, claimed that five of its workers were killed and accused the BJP of inciting violence. AITC's allegations focused on the BJP's provocative behavior towards party offices and workers.

== Violence and Attacks ==
- Types of Violence: The violence included physical assaults, attacks on party offices, vandalism, and arson. Several political party workers were subjected to physical harm, and there were reports of homes and properties being damaged. The intensity of the violence raised concerns over the safety of political activists, especially in rural areas of West Bengal.
- Widespread Nature: The violence was reported across various districts in West Bengal, particularly in rural areas where political tensions were high. Reports of unrest from districts such as South 24 Parganas and Howrah district indicated the extent of the violence.

== Political Reactions ==
- State Government: The AITC government, under Mamata Banerjee, condemned the violence but denied any involvement from its supporters. The party argued that the violence was orchestrated by BJP supporters in retaliation to their defeat. Banerjee herself called for peace and denounced the attacks on party workers.
- Opposition's Response: The BJP blamed the AITC for orchestrating the violence and claimed it was an attempt to intimidate opposition workers and suppress dissent. The Indian Home Ministry was urged to intervene, though no direct action was taken.

== Legal and Administrative Actions ==
The West Bengal Governor, Jagdeep Dhankhar, called for an investigation into the incidents, asking the state police to take action. The National Human Rights Commission (NHRC) also intervened and sent a team to investigate the violence, concerned about human rights violations, particularly the attacks on women and children. Despite multiple reports, the investigation made limited progress in addressing accountability.

=== Media and Public Perception ===
The media coverage of the violence was intense, with national and international outlets reporting on the scale of the violence and the political implications for the state. Al Jazeera and Reuters reported on the escalating nature of the violence, especially in regions outside Kolkata. Public opinion was divided, with supporters of the AITC accusing the BJP of exaggerating the incidents, while BJP supporters claimed that the violence was systematic and targeted.

== Human Rights and Gendered Impact ==
There were numerous reports of women being targeted in the violence, which drew significant criticism from human rights organizations. Cases of sexual violence were also reported, adding a grave dimension to the post-poll violence. The NHRC and other groups called for swift action to prevent such attacks and protect women involved in the political struggle.

== Aftermath ==
Following the violence, there were calls for judicial inquiry, and protests broke out in parts of the state. The situation remained tense for several weeks after the elections, with ongoing political and social repercussions. Protests against the violence were held across the state, including in Kolkata, calling for justice for the victims and an end to the political instability.

== Investigation ==
The BJP leadership of East Burdwan had submitted a list to the police demanding the return of refugee workers of their party. According to police sources, most of the people mentioned in the lists, provided by the BJP in each police station in the district, have been sent back to their home. DSP (Headquarters) Souvik Patra said "There are many on the list who have gone out (of the state) for work. They works all year in the outlying states. They have also been included in this list. It is being represented as if they are not able to return home." Aminul Islam Khan, SDPO of South Burdwan (Sadar), said "Those who do not want to return home are also being put on the list of refugee people."

BJP members had also brought an elderly man, who had gone to attend his grandson's initiation ceremony, to the National Human Rights Commission in Kolkata.

BJP alleged that their workers had been tortured by AITC activists of Bhagabanpur constituency in Purba Medinipur. But it was later learned that in reality AITC supporters were oppressed by BJP workers under the influence of Rabindranath Maity, BJP MLA of the said constituency. A huge crowd attended AITC's rally in Bhagabanpur on 10 July to protest against BJP, state irrigation minister Somen Mahapatra calling it a "reign of terror".

Frances Haugen, a former Facebook employee, revealed before the United States Senate that RSS users, groups and pages had used Facebook to spread violence and communal unrest across West Bengal by promoting anti-Muslim narratives on the platform.

On 3 January 2022, the CBI rejected 21 cases of molestation and rape after it failed to gather enough evidence. But it continues to investigate 39 cases of rape and molestation, 52 cases of murder or unnatural death and has submitted 10 charge sheets for murders/unnatural deaths. On 28 January 2022, 7 people were sent to judicial custody for 14 days for conspiring and murdering BJP worker Manik Moitra during the post poll violence. The CBI had earlier filed a charge sheet against six accused in the case.

=== Investigations after May 2026 ===
In May 2026, after the BJP won the West Bengal elections and formed the state government, it began registering and reopening cases related to violence against BJP workers following the 2021 Assembly polls. Many criminals linked to TMC face charges as the West Bengal Police reopened 59 cases related to the 2021 post-poll violence, registering 181 fresh FIRs.

In May 2026, some Bengali actors, who supported TMC on social media posts linked to the 2021 post-poll violence, claim that they were coerced into supporting TMC due to fear for the safety of their families.
