= Rajib Banerjee =

Indian politician

- রাজীব ব্যানার্জী
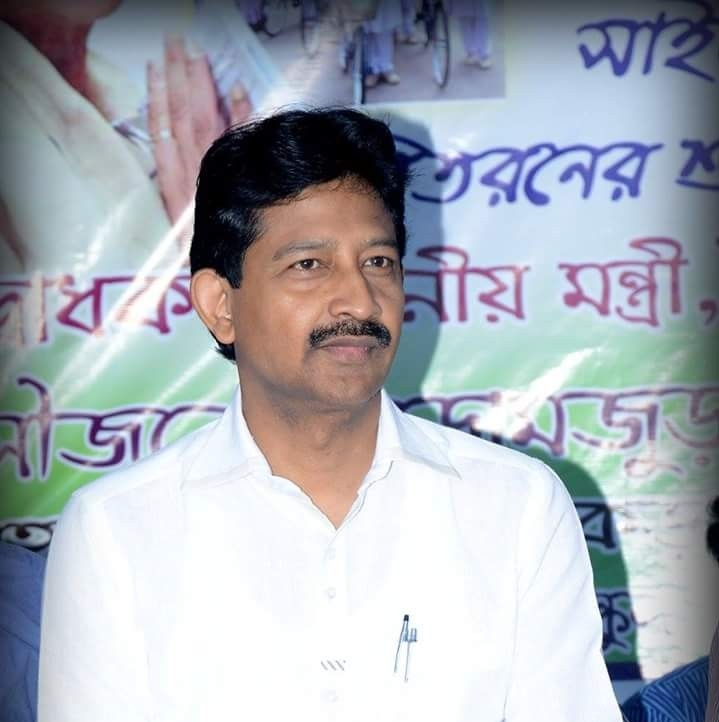

Minister of Forest, Government of West Bengal
- In office 2019 – 22 January 2021
- Governor: Jagdeep Dhankhar
- Chief Minister: Mamata Banerjee
- Preceded by: Binay Krishna Barman

Member of West Bengal Legislative Assembly
- In office 2011–2021
- Preceded by: Mohanta Chatterjee
- Succeeded by: Kalyan Ghosh
- Constituency: Domjur

Minister of Irrigation and Waterways Government of West Bengal
- In office 2011–2018
- Chief Minister: Mamata Banerjee
- Preceded by: Mamata Banerjee (as I/C)
- Succeeded by: Suvendu Adhikari

Personal details
- Born: 1974
- Party: All India Trinamool Congress (2005–2021, 2021–present); Bharatiya Janata Party (2021)
- Education: St. Xavier College
- Occupation: Social Worker; Politician

Rajib Banerjee (b 1974) is an Indian politician who served as the Minister for Forest Affairs in the Government of West Bengal. He was a former Minister in charge of Irrigation & Waterways (2011–2018), and Tribal affairs & backwards classes (2018–2019). He was elected to West Bengal Vidhan Sabha as MLA of Domjur seat in 2011 and 2016 as a member of Trinamool Congress.

== Early life and education ==
Banerjee is from Rashbehari, Howrah district, West Bengal. He is the son of the late Dhananjoy Banerjee. He completed his MBA at IIME in 1995. He also did a Diploma in Computer Application at St. Xavier's Computer Centre in the year 1990 and Honours Graduate from St. Xavier's College in the year 1988.

== Career ==
Banerjee became an MLA for the first time winning the Domjur Assembly constituency representing All India Trinamool Congress in the 2011 West Bengal Legislative Assembly election. In 2011, he polled 1,01,042 votes and defeated his nearest rival, Mohanta Chatterjee of the Communist Party of India (Marxist), by a margin of 24,986 votes. He retained the seat for Trinamool Congress, in the 2016 West Bengal Legislative Assembly election, defeating Protima Dutta, an independent candidate, by a margin of 1,07,701 votes. In the 2021 West Bengal Legislative Assembly election, he contested Domjur on a BJP ticket and lost to Kalyan Ghosh of the Trinamool Congress.

On January 29, 2021, he resigned his MLA post of Domjur assembly constituency. Next day he joined Bharatiya Janata Party. He rejoined All India Trinamool Congress on 31 October 2021.

Political offices
Preceded by	Minister of Tribal Affairs and backward classes in the West Bengal Government; 2018 – 2019	Succeeded by Binay Krishna Barman
Preceded by	Minister for Forest Affairs in the West Bengal Government –	Succeeded by
State Legislative Assembly
Preceded by Mohanta Chatterjee; Communist Party of India (Marxist)	Member of the West Bengal Legislative Assembly from Domjur Assembly constituency 2011 –	Incumbent
