= Department of Forests and Wildlife =

Department of Forests and Wildlife may refer to one of the following state government departments in India:

- Department of Forests and Wildlife (Kerala)
- Department of Forest and Wildlife (Punjab)

== See also ==
- Department of Forest Affairs (West Bengal), India
- Department of Wildlife Protection, Government of Jammu and Kashmir, India
