= Matua festiva =

Conservation status
- Data Deficit (NZ TCS)

Scientific classification
- Kingdom: Animalia
- Phylum: Arthropoda
- Subphylum: Chelicerata
- Class: Arachnida
- Order: Araneae
- Infraorder: Araneomorphae
- Family: Gnaphosidae
- Genus: Matua
- Species: M. festiva

Binomial name
- Matua festiva Forster, 1979

Species of spider

Matua festiva is a species of ground spider endemic to New Zealand.

== Taxonomy ==
This species was described by Ray Forster in 1979 from female specimens. The holotype is stored in Canterbury Museum.

== Description ==
The female is recorded at 7.7mm in length. It is most similar to Matua valida.

== Distribution ==
This species is only known from Canterbury, New Zealand.

== Conservation status ==
Under the New Zealand Threat Classification System, this species is listed as "Data Deficient" with the qualifiers of "Data Poor: Size", "Data Poor: Trend" and "One Location".
