= Ma Mati Manush =

Bengali political slogan

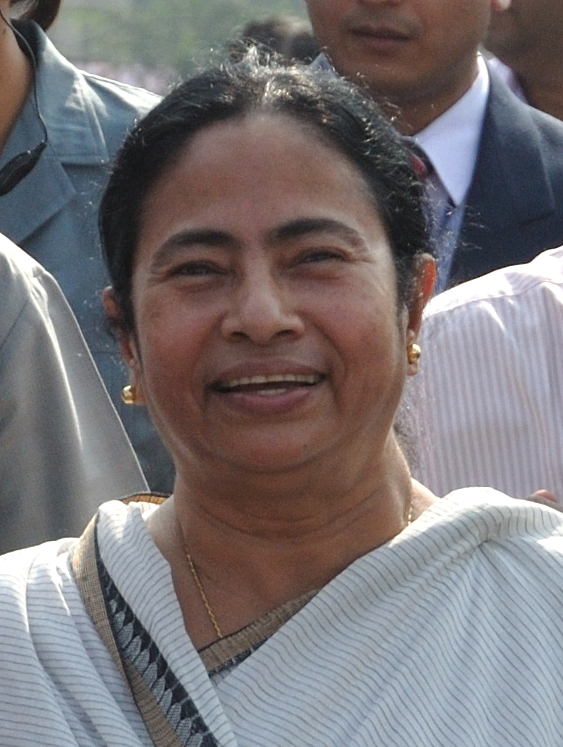
Mamata Banerjee, Chief Minister of West Bengal, popularized the slogan.

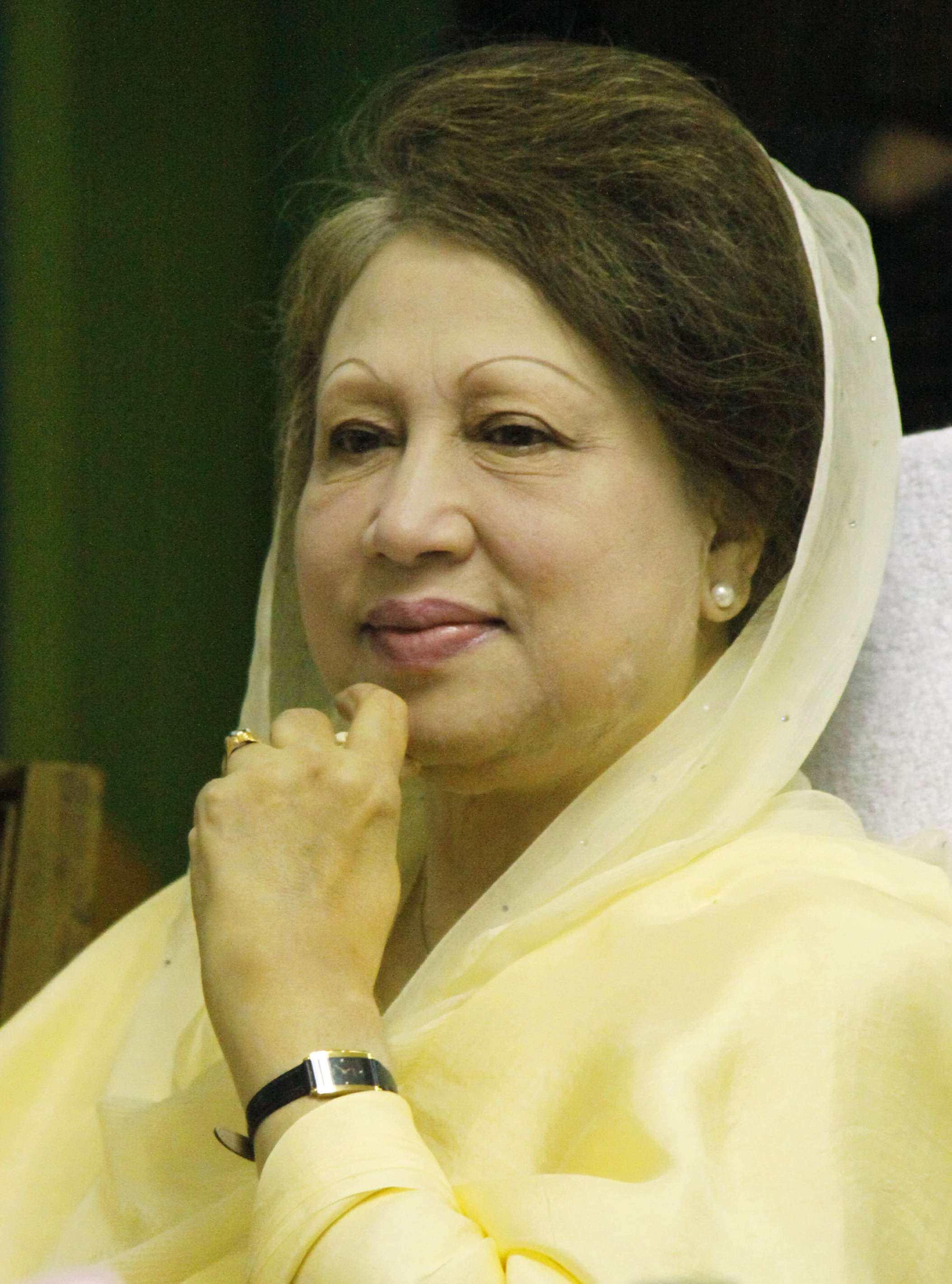
Khaleda Zia, former Prime Minister of Bangladesh, first coined the slogan.

Maa Mati Manush (Bengali: মা মাটি মানুষ,) is a Bengali political slogan, coined by All India Trinamool Congress chief and former Chief Minister of West Bengal Mamata Banerjee. The term is translated as "Mother, Motherland, and People". It became very popular in West Bengal during the 2009 General election and 2011 state assembly election. The slogan was widely used by the political party in almost all of its political and election campaigns. Original source of the slogan was traced back to Khaleda Zia of BNP, Bangladesh. She had coined this slogan as her party tagline during 1991 election in Bangladesh.

Later, Mamata Banerjee wrote a book in Bengali with the same title. Multiple Bengali theatre groups produced dramas with this slogan in the title. A song was also recorded, with the same title, to glorify the theme. According to a report published in June 2011, it was one of the six most popular political slogans in India at that time.

== History ==
With all humility, we congratulate the people of Bengal. This is the victory of the Maa Mati Manush of Bengal. This is the time to celebrate for the people of Bengal.

— Mamata Banerjee after winning 2011 Assembly election of West Bengal

This slogan was coined by All India Trinamool Congress chief Mamata Banerjee as their "war cry" before 2009 General election of India. and eventually became the signature slogan of Banerjee and her party. The three words of the slogan "Ma", "Mati" and "Manush" which mean "Mother", "(Mother)land" and "People" respectively were three powerful emotional elements.

=== Political campaigns and elections ===
The slogan was widely used by the political party in almost every one of their political and election campaigns; these campaigns also condemned acts under the existent government, including Nandigram violence, Singur Tata Nano controversy, land acquisition issues, death of Rizwanur Rahman, the Sachar Commission report, and even in the common daily life issues like protests against power cuts, protests against rail accidents etc. Nandigram, Singur issues and this slogan were the main weapons of All India Trinamool Congress against the ruling Left Front government of West Bengal.

== Influence ==
This simplistic slogan had bigger impact and influence on common people than the theoretical jargons used by the Left Front parties. According to a report published in Indian newspaper Daily News and Analysis, this slogan helped "Trinamool Congress chief Mamata Banerjee virtually flatten the ruling Left Front in West Bengal Lok Sabha and civic polls". After winning the assembly election Banerjee dedicated the victory to Ma Mati Manush. According to a minister of West Bengal and also a leader of Trinamool Congress, Banerjee rode to success on this slogan and it was a "political coinage".

== Adaptations ==
=== Book ===
After the slogan became popular, Mamata Banerjee published a book of poems titled Ma Mati Manush. The poems of this book were mainly political in nature. The book was published by the Dey's Publishers of Kolkata.

=== Song ===
A song was also recorded to glorify the theme Ma Mati Manush. The song was written by Anindya Chatterjee, lead vocalist of the Bengali band Chandrabindoo, and focused on communal harmony. The first two lines of the song were– "Eta Ma Mati Manusher din. Eta Ma Mati Manusher gaan (This is the day of Ma Mati Manush, It is the song of Ma Mati Manush)."

=== Film poster ===
In 2009, the slogan was used in the posters of Bengali film Krishna. Shankar Roy, the director of the film told in an interview– "Yes, we were inspired by Trinamool’s slogan, which for us means revolt against corruption".

=== Theatre ===
The popularity of the slogan gave rise to a number of jatras (street plays) as well. In 2009, Uttam Opera of West Bengal staged a jatra titled Ma Mati Manush Kadche... Agnikanya Aschhe. In the same year, Shilpilok Opera staged another jatra, named Ma Matir Lorai.

=== Political magazine ===
In February 2011, Trinamool Congress launched their party magazine Ma Mati Manush and attempted to reach as many people as possible through the magazine. This magazine was also a "brainchild" of Mamata Banerjee. The chief editor of the magazine was Subrata Bakshi who was at that time a legislator of the state too.

== Criticism ==
- Ex-Chief Minister of West Bengal and senior political leader of Communist Party of India (Marxist) called the slogan a jatra. Incidentally a play with the same title was written in the 1970s when Communist Party of India defeated Indian National Congress in West Bengal.
- In April 2011, West Bengal's communist party politician Gautam Deb complained that Banerjee "stole" this slogan from Bangladesh. He said the same slogan was coined and widely used by Begum Khaleda Zia and her political party Bangladesh Nationalist Party in the 1991 general election of Bangladesh.
