= Matua =

Matua may refer to:

== People ==
- Hotu Matuꞌa, legendary first settler and chief of Easter Island and ancestor of the Rapa Nui people
- Matua (priest) (fl. 1838), High Priest of Mangareva
- Fred Matua (1984–2012), American football player
- Henare Matua (c.1838–1894), New Zealand tribal leader, reformer, and politician

== Places ==
- Matua (island), in the Kuril Islands chain
- Matua, New Zealand, a suburb of Tauranga

== Other uses ==
- Matua (spider), a spider genus
- Matua Mahasangha, a sect of Hinduism in Bengal
- Matua, a social caste of the Chamorro people
