= Binay Krishna Barman =

Indian politician

Member of the West Bengal Legislative Assembly
- In office 2016–2021
- Constituency: Mathabanga

Minister of Forest Affairs, West Bengal
- In office 2013–2019
- Succeeded by: Rajib Banerjee

Minister of Tribal Affairs and backward classes, West Bengal
- In office 2019–2021

Personal details
- Party: All India Trinamool Congress
- Occupation: Politician

Binay Krishna Barman is an Indian Politician from the state of West Bengal. He is a two term member of the West Bengal Legislative Assembly. He was chairman of All India Trinamool Congress Coochbehar District (2019-2021).

== MLA from Mathabhanga constituency ==
He served as the Member in the West Bengal Legislative Assembly (MLA) representing the Mathabhanga (Vidhan Sabha constituency) from 2011. He is from the All India Trinamool Congress.

Political offices
Preceded by Rajib Banerjee	Minister of Tribal Affairs and backward classes in the West Bengal Government; 2019 –	Succeeded by
State Legislative Assembly
Preceded by Ananta Roy	Member of the West Bengal Legislative Assembly from Mathabhanga Assembly constituency 2011 –	Incumbent
