= Dinesh Chandra Dakua =

Indian politician (1929 or 1930 – 2025)

Dinesh Chandra Dakua (1929 or 1930 – 20 August 2025) was an Indian politician, belonging to the Communist Party of India (Marxist) (CPI(M)). He represented the Mathabhanga constituency in the West Bengal Legislative Assembly 1967–1969 and 1977–2006. He was a cabinet minister in the West Bengal state governments between 1987 and 2006, first as Minister for Scheduled Caste and Tribes Welfare and later as Minister of Tourism.

== Legislator ==
Dakua was active in the students movement 1948–1950. As a lawyer, he practised law in Mathabhanga Court.

He contested the Mathabhanga seat in the 1962 West Bengal Legislative Assembly election as the Communist Party of India candidate. He finished in second place with 15,482 votes (45.20%). He stood as the CPI candidate in the 1963 by-election for the Cooch Behar parliamentary seat, finishing in fourth place with 17,760 votes (7.83%).

Dakua was elected to the West Bengal Legislative Assembly in the 1967 election, standing as a CPI(M) candidate and winning the Mathabhanga seat with 26,872 votes (64.26%). Dakua lost the Mathabhanga seat in the 1969 West Bengal Legislative Assembly election, finishing in second place with 22,478 votes (48.52%). He contested the Mathabhanga seat in the 1971 election, finishing in second place with 18,386 votes (38.89%). He again finished in second place in the 1972 election, obtaining 18,173 votes (39.80%).

He returned to the West Bengal Legislative Assembly following the 1977 West Bengal Legislative Assembly election, winning the Mathabhanga seat as the CPI(M) candidate. He was re-elected in 1982, 1987, 1991, 1996 and 2001.

== Minister ==
Dakua was named as the Minister for Scheduled Castes and Scheduled Tribes in the Third Left Front government, formed after the 1987 West Bengal Legislative Assembly election. He became the first West Bengal state government minister from the Rajbanshi people.

He was again named as the Minister-in-Charge of the Department of SC/ST Welfare in the Fourth Left Front government, formed after the 1991 election. In the Fifth Left Front government, formed after the 1996 West Bengal Legislative Assembly election Dakua's post was changed to Minister-in-Charge of the Department S.C., S.T. & OBC Welfare.

Dakua was named as the Minister of Tourism in the Sixth Left Front government, formed after the 2001 West Bengal Legislative Assembly election. He remained in the role as Minister of Tourism until 2006. CPI(M) denied Dakua a ticket to contest the 2006 West Bengal Legislative Assembly election. The Mathabhanga seat was instead given to Ananta Roy, chairman of the zilla parishad. The move reportedly caused dissent in the party in the area, with the Dakua camp arguing that Roy was an outsider living in the Cooch Behar assembly constituency. In parallel to his ministerial functions, he was a member of the All India Kisan Council.

== Views of Rajbanshi statehood movement ==
Dakua was actively involved in social and cultural associations of the Rajbanshi people. But he was a prominent opponent of the movement for a Rajbanshi state, labelling the movement as 'separatist'. He argued that Rajbanshi should be considered as a dialect of the Bengali language, rather than a separate language.

In August 2002, following the killing of 5 CPI(M) workers by the Kamtapur Liberation Organisation (KLO), Dakua and CPI(M) West Bengal Forest Minister Jogesh Burman protested against the CPI(M) state leadership, accusing them of having ignored their warnings on KLO activities. Dakua and Burman argued that additional funds should have been assigned to the underdeveloped districts, and that the "poverty and backwardness of the locals had been prompting them to indulge in various criminal activities".

== Later life and death ==
Dakua's house was attacked in the wave of post-poll violence in the wake of the 2016 West Bengal Legislative Assembly election.

Dakua died at a government hospital in Kolkata, on 20 August 2025, at the age of 95.
