= Mathabhanga Assembly constituency =

Mathabhanga (SC)
- Constituency No. 2 for the West Bengal Legislative Assembly
- Interactive Map Outlining Mathabhanga (SC) Assembly Constituency

Constituency details
- Country: India
- Region: East India
- State: West Bengal
- District: Cooch Behar
- Lok Sabha constituency: Cooch Behar (SC)
- Established: 1951
- Reservation: SC

Member of Legislative Assembly
- 18th West Bengal Legislative Assembly
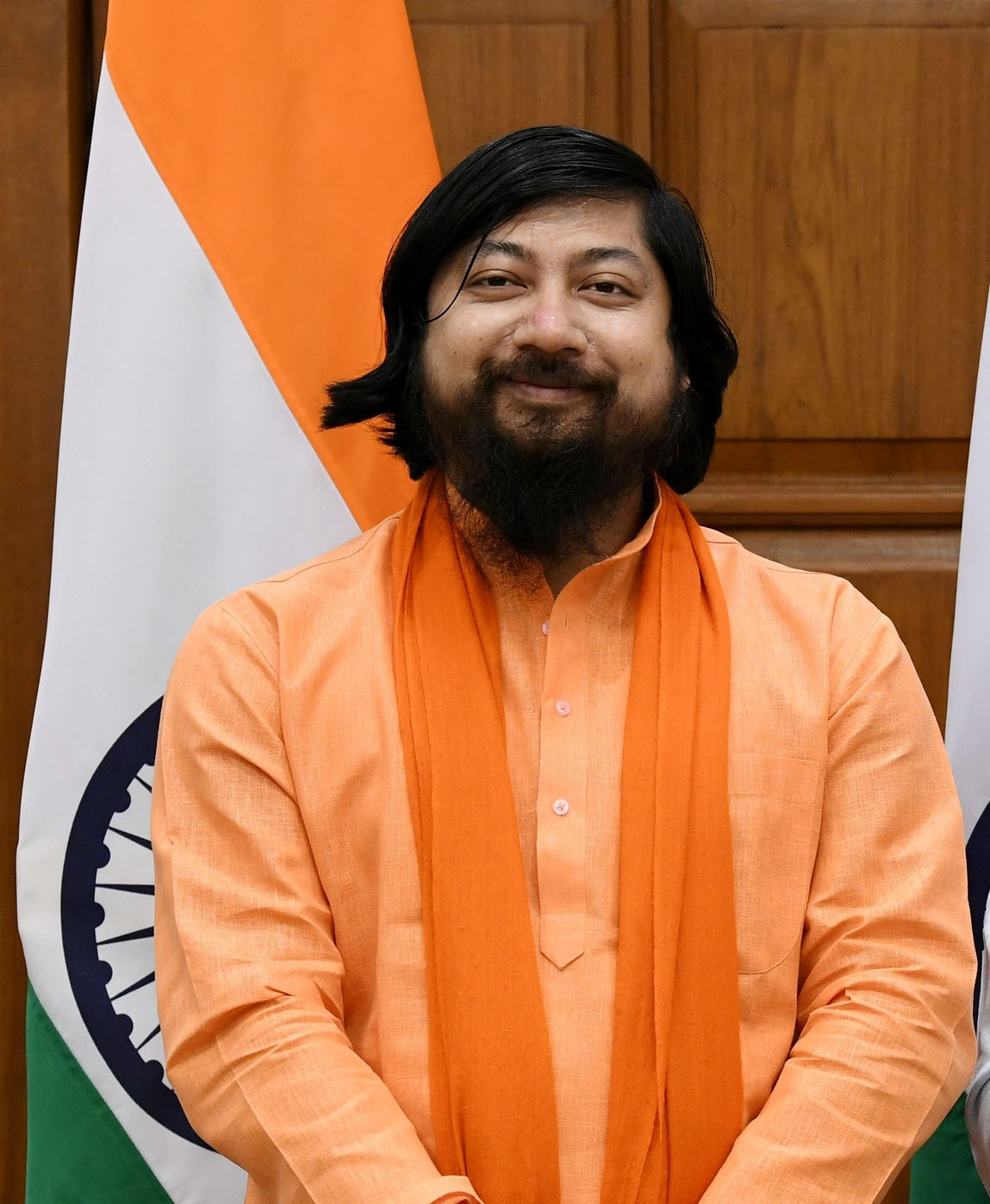
- Incumbent Nisith Pramanik
- Party: Bharatiya Janata Party
- Elected year: 2026
- Preceded by: Sushil Barman

Most Successful parties from Mathabhanga (SC) assembly
1. Communist Party of India (Marxist) (8 times) (44.5%)
2. Indian National Congress (6 times) (33.3%)
3. All India Trinamool Congress (2 times) (11.1%)
4. Bharatiya Janata Party (2 times) (11.1%)

Mathabhanga (SC) Assembly constituency is an assembly constituency in Cooch Behar district in the Indian state of West Bengal. It is reserved for scheduled castes.

== Overview ==
As per orders of the Delimitation Commission, No. 2 Mathabhanga Assembly constituency (SC) covers Mathabhanga municipality, Mathabhanga II community development block, and Hazrahat I, Hazrahat II and Pachagarh gram panchayats of Mathabhanga I community development block.

Mathabhanga Assembly constituency is part of No. 1. Cooch Behar (Lok Sabha constituency) (SC).

== Members of the Legislative Assembly ==
Year	Name	Party
1951	Sarada Prasad Pramanick	Indian National Congress
1957	Sarada Prasad Pramanick	Indian National Congress
1962	Mahendra Nath Dakua	Indian National Congress
1967	Dinesh Chandra Dakua	Communist Party of India (Marxist)
1969	Birendranath Roy	Indian National Congress
1971	Birendranath Roy	Indian National Congress
1972	Birendranath Roy	Indian National Congress
1977	Dinesh Chandra Dakua	Communist Party of India (Marxist)
1982	Dinesh Chandra Dakua	Communist Party of India (Marxist)
1987	Dinesh Chandra Dakua	Communist Party of India (Marxist)
1991	Dinesh Chandra Dakua	Communist Party of India (Marxist)
1996	Dinesh Chandra Dakua	Communist Party of India (Marxist)
2001	Dinesh Chandra Dakua	Communist Party of India (Marxist)
2006	Ananta Roy	Communist Party of India (Marxist)
2011	Binay Krishna Barman	All India Trinamool Congress
2016	Binay Krishna Barman	All India Trinamool Congress
2021	Sushil Barman	Bharatiya Janata Party
2026	Nisith Pramanik	Bharatiya Janata Party

== Election results ==
=== 2026 ===
In the 2026 West Bengal Legislative Assembly election, Nisith Pramanik of BJP defeated Dr. Sablu Barman of TMC by 57090 votes.

2026 West Bengal Legislative Assembly election: Mathabhanga (SC)
Party	Candidate	Votes	%	±%
BJP	Nisith Pramanik	143,340	59.27	▲6.4
AITC	Dr. Sablu Barman	86,250	35.66	▼5.01
CPI(M)	Khagen Chandra Barman	4,030	1.67	▼1.93
IND	Dr. Harekrishna Sarkar	1,168	0.48	New entry
INC	Kshitendra Nath Barman	1,118	0.46	New entry
BSP	Mritunjoy Biswas	1,097	0.45	New entry
IND	Mihir Sarkar	883	0.37	New entry
KPP(U)	Premananda Barman	755	0.31	▼0.29
IND	Provakar Roy	684	0.28	New entry
IND	Haradhan Roy	465	0.19	▼0.35
SUCI(C)	Bikash Barman	337	0.14	▼1.3
IND	Kangsa Raj Barman	325	0.13	New entry
IND	Goutam Barman	288	0.12	New entry
AMB	Subodh Barman	192	0.08	▼0.15
NOTA	Nota	913	0.38	▼0.29
Majority		57,090	23.61	▲11.41
Turnout		241,845	97.07	▲10.71
Registered electors		249,135		▲0.45
BJP hold		Swing	5.7	

=== 2021 ===
2021 West Bengal Legislative Assembly election: Mathabhanga
Party	Candidate	Votes	%	±%
BJP	Sushil Barman	113,249	52.87	
AITC	Girindra Nath Barman	87,115	40.67	
CPI(M)	Ashok Barman	7,718	3.6	
NOTA	None of the above	1,443	0.67	
Majority		26,134	12.2	
Turnout		214,203	86.36	
BJP gain from AITC		Swing		

=== 2016 ===
West Bengal assembly elections, 2016: Mathabhanga (SC) constituency
Party	Candidate	Votes	%	±%
AITC	Binay Krishna Barman	96,383	48.1	▲1.74
CPI(M)	Khagen Chandra Barman	64,465	32.17	▼11.13
BJP	Sushil Barman	31,258	15.6	▲8.89
NOTA	None of the above	1,980	0.99	
Majority		31,918	15.93	▲12.77
Turnout		200,385	87.27	▲0.49
AITC hold		Swing		

=== 2011 ===
In the 2011 election, Binay Krishna Barman of Trinamool Congress defeated his nearest rival Ananta Roy of CPI(M).

West Bengal assembly elections, 2011: Mathabhanga (SC) constituency
Party	Candidate	Votes	%	±%
AITC	Binay Krishna Barman	78,249	46.94	
CPI(M)	Ananta Roy	72,925	43.74	
BJP	Sushil Barman	11,308	6.78	
Independent	Mantu Barman	2,919		
BSP	Tilak Chand Barman	1,954		
Independent	Hare Krishan Sarkar	1,079		
Majority		5,324	3.19	
Turnout		166,710	85.97	
AITC gain from CPI(M)		Swing		

.# Trinamool Congress did not contest the seat in 2006.

=== 2006 ===
In the 2006 state assembly elections, Ananta Roy of the Communist Party of India (Marxist) won the Mathabhanga seat defeating Hem Chandra Barman of the Bharatiya Janata Party (BJP). Contests in most years were multi cornered but only winners and runners are being mentioned. Dinesh Chandra Dakua of CPI(M) won the seat six times in a row from 1977 to 2001, and also in 1967. He defeated Binoy Krishna Barman of the Trinamool Congress in 2001, Jatindranath Barman of the Indian National Congress in 1996, Prasenjit Barman of Congress in 1991, Jatindranath Barman of Congress in 1987, Hitendra Nath Pramanik of Congress on 1982 and Pratap Singha in 1977.

=== 1972 ===
Birendranath Roy of Congress won in 1972, 1971 and 1969. Dinesh Chandra Dakua of CPI(M) won in 1967. Mahendra Nath Dakua of Congress won in 1962. Sarada Prasad Pramanick of Congress won in 1957 and in independent India's first election in 1951.
