= Domjur Assembly constituency =

Domjur
- Constituency No. 184 for the West Bengal Legislative Assembly
- Interactive Map Outlining Domjur Assembly Constituency

Constituency details
- Country: India
- Region: East India
- State: West Bengal
- District: Howrah
- Lok Sabha constituency: Serampore
- Established: 1951
- Total electors: 216,262
- Reservation: None

Member of Legislative Assembly
- 18th West Bengal Legislative Assembly
- Incumbent Tapas Maity
- Party: Democratic Trinamool Congress
- Elected year: 2026

Domjur Assembly constituency is a legislative assembly constituency in Howrah district in the Indian state of West Bengal.

== Overview ==
As per orders of the Delimitation Commission, No. 184 Domjur Assembly constituency is composed of the following: Bally Jagachha community development block and Bankra I, Bankra II, Bankra III, Makardah II, Narna, Shalap I and Shalap II gram panchayats of Domjur community development block.

Domjur Assembly constituency is part of No. 27 Sreerampur (Lok Sabha constituency). Domjur was earlier (until 2008) part of Howrah (Lok Sabha constituency).

== Members of the Legislative Assembly ==
Year	Name	Party
1951	Tarapada Dey	Communist Party of India
1957	Tarapada Dey	Communist Party of India
1962	Tarapada Dey	Communist Party of India
1967	A.H.Mondal	Indian National Congress
1969	Joykesh Mukherjee	Communist Party of India (Marxist)
1971	Joykesh Mukherjee	Communist Party of India (Marxist)
1972	Krishnapada Royl	Indian National Congress
1977	Joykesh Mukherjee	Communist Party of India (Marxist)
1982	Joykesh Mukherjee	Communist Party of India (Marxist)
1987	Joykesh Mukherjee	Communist Party of India (Marxist)
1991	Padma Nidhi Dhar	Communist Party of India (Marxist)
1996	Padma Nidhi Dhar	Communist Party of India (Marxist)
2001	Padma Nidhi Dhar	Communist Party of India (Marxist)
2006	Mohanta Chatterjee	Communist Party of India (Marxist)
2011	Rajib Banerjee	All India Trinamool Congress
2016	Rajib Banerjee	All India Trinamool Congress
2021	Kalyan Ghosh	All India Trinamool Congress
2026	Tapas Maity	All India Trinamool Congress

== Election results ==
Vote share of Winning candidates
2026	52.73%
2021	52.00%
2016	67.76%
2011	54.07%
2006	53.30%
2001	51.95%
1996	51.81%
1991	52.54%
1987	56.46%
1982	58.30%
1977	65.12%
1972	49.92%
1971	60.32%
1969	58.45%
1967	48.60%
1962	49.44%
1957	60.30%
1951	54.96%

=== 2026 ===
2026 West Bengal Legislative Assembly election: Domjur
Party	Candidate	Votes	%	±%
AITC	Tapas Maity	134,036	52.73	▲0.73
BJP	Gobinda Hazra	91,859	36.14	▲1.13
CPI(M)	Dulu Das	19,834	7.8	▼1.27
NOTA	None of the above	1,183	0.47	▼0.36
Majority		42,177	16.59	▼0.4
Turnout		254,187	94.37	▲10.5
AITC hold		Swing		

=== 2021 ===
West Bengal assembly elections, 2021: Domjur
Party	Candidate	Votes	%	±%
AITC	Kalyan Ghosh	130,499	52.0	
BJP	Rajib Banerjee	87,879	35.01	
CPI(M)	Uttam Bera	22,768	9.07	
Independent	Sumanta Kayal	2,855	1.14	
NOTA	None of the above	2,082	0.83	
Majority		42,620	16.99	
Turnout		250,978	83.87	
AITC hold		Swing		

=== 2016 ===
2016 West Bengal Legislative Assembly election: Domjur
Party	Candidate	Votes	%	±%
AITC	Rajib Banerjee	148,768	67.76	
Independent	Protima Dutta	41,067	18.70	
BJP	Jayanta Das	15,489	7.05	
Independent	Kailash Naskar	3,187	1.45	
NOTA	None of the above	2,710	1.23	
IUC	Sabila Begum Sardar	2,438	1.11	
Independent	Surojit Naskar	2,084	0.95	
Independent	Pratima Dutta	1,965	0.89	
Independent	Jayanta Mondal	1,849	0.84	
Majority		107,701	49.06	
Turnout		219,557	84.53	
AITC hold		Swing		

=== 2011 ===
2011 West Bengal Legislative Assembly election: Domjur
Party	Candidate	Votes	%	±%
AITC	Rajib Banerjee	101,042	54.07	
CPI(M)	Mohanta Chatterjee	76,056	40.70	
BJP	Parthasarathi Baksi	4,210	2.25	
IUC	Sabila Begum	1,526	0.82	
Independent	Subrata Das	1,393	0.75	
Independent	Nirmal Mondal	1,322	0.71	
Independent	Jugal Hazra	870	0.47	
Independent	Jayanta Mondal	459	0.25	
Majority		24,986	13.37	
Turnout		186,878	86.25	
Swing to AITC from CPI(M)		Swing		

=== 2006 ===
2006 West Bengal Legislative Assembly election: Domjur
Party	Candidate	Votes	%	±%
CPI(M)	Mohanta Chatterjee	100,736	53.30	
AITC	Rajib Banerjee	70,032	37.05	
Independent	Kazi Safi Uddin	12,998	6.88	
LJP	Kamal Kanta Bhowmik	1,768	0.94	
Independent	Monoranjan Panja	971	0.51	
Independent	Sekh Abdul Momin	839	0.44	
Independent	Amal Chandra Das	702	0.37	
Independent	Partha Pratim Dey	596	0.32	
Majority		30,704	16.25	
Turnout		188,999		
CPI(M) hold		Swing		

=== 2001 ===
2001 West Bengal Legislative Assembly election: Domjur
Party	Candidate	Votes	%	±%
CPI(M)	Padma Nidhi Dhar	94,502	51.95	
AITC	Brajamohan Majumder	78,258	43.02	
BJP	Rabindra Nath Chakraborty	4,676	2.57	
Independent	Sk. Gorai	1,601	0.88	
Independent	Sekh Abdul Momin	943	0.52	
PDS	Jahangir Sk.	650	0.36	
Independent	Biplab Das	274	0.15	
Independent	Panchu Bagani	268	0.15	
Independent	Partha Pratim Bandyopadhyay	268	0.15	
Independent	Samsul Hoque Laskar	235	0.13	
Independent	Jamadar Sirajul	218	0.12	
Majority		16,244	8.93	
Turnout		182,086	70.67	
CPI(M) hold		Swing		

=== 1996 ===
1996 West Bengal Legislative Assembly election: Domjur
Party	Candidate	Votes	%	±%
CPI(M)	Padmanidhi Dhar	95,319	51.81	
INC	Bhabani Prasad Bhattacharyya	82,649	44.92	
BJP	Manjusri Dey	5,405	2.94	
Independent	Gopal Ghosh	240	0.13	
Independent	Kisalay Hait	221	0.12	
AMB	Siddheswar Mukhopadhaya	155	0.08	
Majority		12,670	6.89	
Turnout		187,625	80.58	
CPI(M) hold		Swing		

=== 1991 ===
1991 West Bengal Legislative Assembly election: Domjur
Party	Candidate	Votes	%	±%
CPI(M)	Padmanidhi Dhar	75,590	52.54	
INC	Sachin Ray	59,320	41.23	
BJP	Saroj Kumar Ghosh	8,310	5.78	
Independent	Monohar Chakraborty	417	0.29	
AMB	Siddheswar Mukherjee	247	0.17	
Majority		16,270	11.31	
Turnout		146,508	75.13	
CPI(M) hold		Swing		

=== 1987 ===
1987 West Bengal Legislative Assembly election: Domjur
Party	Candidate	Votes	%	±%
CPI(M)	Joykesh Mukherjee	65,477	56.46	
INC	Sachin Ray	49,763	42.91	
Independent	Amar Majumder	523	0.45	
Independent	Siddheswar Mukherjee	202	0.17	
Majority		15,714	13.55	
Turnout		117,836	77.12	
CPI(M) hold		Swing		

=== 1982 ===
1982 West Bengal Legislative Assembly election: Domjur
Party	Candidate	Votes	%	±%
CPI(M)	Joykesh Mukherjee	50,617	58.30	
INC	Mahadeb Manna	34,725	39.99	
JP	Nandlal Chakraborty	947	1.09	
Independent	Siddheswar Mukhopadhyay	279	0.32	
Independent	Lakshi Kanta Baidya	256	0.29	
Majority		15,892	18.31	
Turnout		88,633	68.65	
CPI(M) hold		Swing		

=== 1977 ===
1977 West Bengal Legislative Assembly election: Domjur
Party	Candidate	Votes	%	±%
CPI(M)	Joykesh Mukherjee	37,364	65.12	
INC	Krishna Pada Roy	12,788	22.29	
JP	Sailen Parbat	7,228	12.60	
Majority		24,576	42.83	
Turnout		58,213	61.15	
Swing to CPI(M) from INC		Swing		

=== 1972 ===
1972 West Bengal Legislative Assembly election: Domjur
Party	Candidate	Votes	%	±%
INC	Krishna Pada Roy	30,550	49.92	
CPI(M)	Joykesh Mukherjee	29,675	48.49	
INC(O)	Debendra Nath Mondal	979	1.60	
Majority		875	1.43	
Turnout		62,775	69.80	
Swing to INC from CPI(M)		Swing		

=== 1971 ===
1971 West Bengal Legislative Assembly election: Domjur
Party	Candidate	Votes	%	±%
CPI(M)	Joykesh Mukherjee	34,485	60.32	
INC	Rebati Ranjan Mukhopadhyay	15,568	27.23	
Bangla Congress	Amjan Ali Sardar	4,384	7.67	
INC(O)	Sankar Prosad Bandopadhyay	1,851	3.24	
RCPI	Nirdhan Sardar	880	1.54	
Majority		18,917	33.09	
Turnout		59,808	69.47	
CPI(M) hold		Swing		

=== 1969 ===
1969 West Bengal Legislative Assembly election: Domjur
Party	Candidate	Votes	%	±%
CPI(M)	Joykesh Mukherjee	35,946	58.45	
INC	Ahmed Hossain Mondal	24,966	40.59	
PBI	Siddeswar Mukhopdhyay	425	0.69	
NDF	Sukumar Chowdhury	166	0.27	
Majority		10,980	17.86	
Turnout		62,537	76.51	
Swing to CPI(M) from INC		Swing		

=== 1967 ===
1967 West Bengal Legislative Assembly election: Domjur
Party	Candidate	Votes	%	±%
INC	A. H. Mondal	28,271	48.60	
CPI(M)	J. Mukherjee	27,462	47.21	
Independent	A. G. Chattapadhayaya	2,440	4.19	
Majority		809	1.39	
Turnout		59,892	78.93	
Swing to INC from CPI		Swing		

=== 1962 ===
1962 West Bengal Legislative Assembly election: Domjur
Party	Candidate	Votes	%	±%
CPI	Tara Pada Dey	25,770	49.44	
INC	Ahmad Hossain Mondal	24,961	47.89	
ABJS	Radha Raman Mitra	1,395	2.68	
Majority		809	1.55	
Turnout		53,423	65.62	
CPI hold		Swing		

=== 1957 ===
1957 West Bengal Legislative Assembly election: Domjur
Party	Candidate	Votes	%	±%
CPI	Tarapada De	25,236	60.30	
INC	Biswaratan Ganguly	15,904	38.00	
Independent	Haripada Sinha	712	1.70	
Majority		9,332	22.30	
Turnout		41,852	65.54	
CPI hold		Swing		

=== 1951 ===
1951 West Bengal Legislative Assembly election: Domjur
Party	Candidate	Votes	%	±%
CPI	Tarapada Dey	16,947	54.96	
INC	Santosh Mukherjee	6,076	19.70	
Independent	A. C. Chatterjee	2,255	7.31	
Independent	Dhon Krishna Bandopadhyaya	2,129	6.90	
Independent	Baburali Sardar	1,855	6.02	
FBL(RG)	Bejoy Krishna Kundu Chowdhury	945	3.06	
HM	Karuiri Sudhir	406	1.32	
KMPP	Monindra Nath Ghosh	126	0.41	
Independent	Jatindra Nath Pan	96	0.31	
Majority		10,871	35.26	
Turnout		30,835	59.19	
CPI win (new seat)				
