= Nandigram violence =

2007 land acquisition protests in West Bengal, India

Nandigram Violence
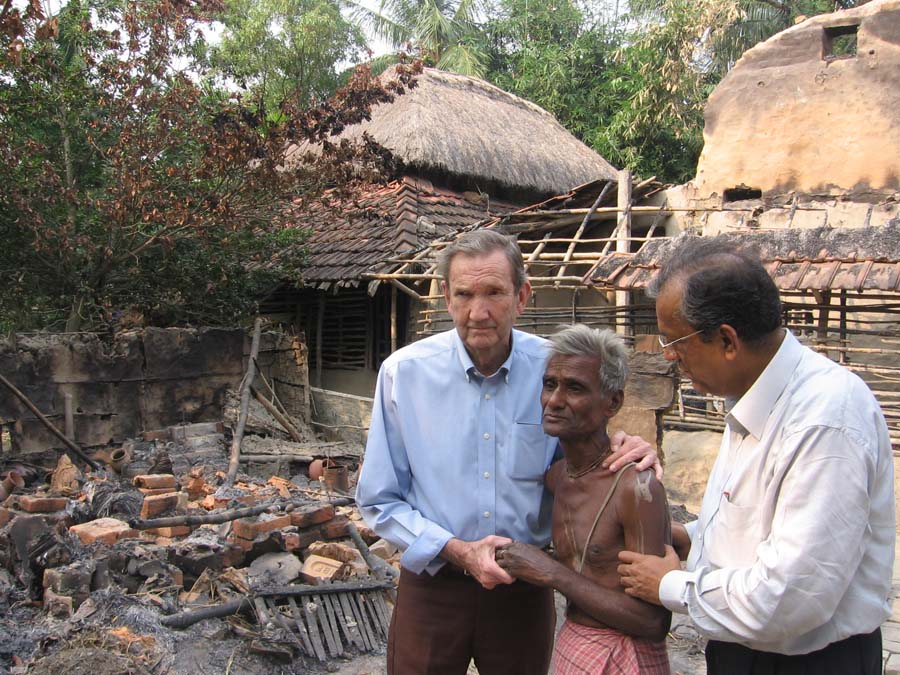
- Condition of the village after the violence
- Date: 2007–2008
- Location: Nandigram, West Bengal, India
- Caused by: Land acquisition for a project by the WB Government led by the Left Front to create a special economic zone in 2007.
- Methods: Riots, arsons, vandalism, murders, gang rape
- Result: Left Front government withdraw the land acquisition.; Fall of the Left Front in West Bengal.; TMC came into power in 2011.

Parties
Government of West Bengal led by the Left Front: West Bengal Police; Communist Party of India (Marxist); All India Forward Bloc; Left front; Supported by: Salim Group; Unsupported by: Revolutionary Socialist Party	Bhumi Uchhed Pratirodh Committee: All India Trinamool Congress; Communist Party of India (Maoist); Socialist Unity Centre of India (Communist); Indian National Congress; Bharatiya Janata Party; Jamiat Ulema-e-Hind	Marxist-Leninist Groups: Communist Party of India (Marxist-Leninist) Liberation; (PCC-CPIML); CPIML New Democracy

Lead figures
Buddhadeb Bhattacharjee (CPIM)	Mamata Banerjee (TMC); Suvendu Adhikari	Kartik Paul (CPIML)

Casualties
- Deaths: 14 died in police shooting 100+ civilians killed in violence

Violence erupted in Nandigram, West Bengal, India, in 2007 due to the land acquisition for a project taken up by the Left Front-led Government of West Bengal to create a chemical hub, a type of special economic zone (SEZ). The policy led to an emergency in the region, and 14 people died in a police shooting.

According to Criminal Investigation Department (CID) reports, the Nandigram violence saw a Maoist insurgency in the area during the protests. However, the Home Secretary of West Bengal stated that the presence of Maoists could not be confirmed in Nandigram. The Central Bureau of Investigation (CBI) later exonerated the Buddhadeb Bhattacharya government of responsibility for the shootings. However, Buddhadeb Bhattacharya had said earlier "They (the opposition) have been paid back in the same coin," supporting the violence in Nandigram by his own party workers.

== Background ==
The SEZ controversy began when the government of West Bengal decided that a chemical hub would be established in a Nandigram SEZ by the Salim Group of Indonesia. The SEZ policy required the expropriation of 10,000 acres (4,000 ha) of land owned by farmers in the region. The farmers gathered under the Bhoomi Raksha Committee, which was backed by Maoists. While the governor was airborne and unavailable, police entered the Nandigram area. Violence between demonstrators and police left at least 14 villagers dead and 70 injured. Mamata Banerjee and her All India Trinamool Congress party noted the issue, and the slogan Ma Mati Manush (Mother, Motherland and People) was used in their election campaigns.

The Bhumi Uchhed Pratirodh Committee (BUPC) blocked roads leading into the region from January to March 2007. Several FIRs were registered at the Nandigram and Khejuri police stations alleging arson and looting. The complaints could not be investigated by local police, who could not enter the villages during the standoff. Thousands of leftist supporters, attacked and driven from their homes, were housed in camps.

After the villagers' protests against the acquisition of land in Nandigram for the proposed chemical hub, the state government yielded to the BUPC demands and announced the project's cancellation in early March 2007. A police team was sent to prevent protesters from digging up roads; one police officer was killed while trying to repair a road, and 12 others were seriously injured.

== Protests and violence ==
=== Events of 14 March 2007 ===
The administration was directed to break up BUPC control of Nandigram, and an operation with over 3,000 police officers was launched on 14 March 2007. News of the impending action leaked to the BUPC, who amassed about 5,000 villagers at the entrances to Nandigram. Official figures claimed that 14 farmers died in the firing, but over 100 were declared "missing".

The deaths in Nandigram sparked controversy about left-wing politics in India. Federal police said that they had recovered many bullets of a type not used by police, but in widespread criminal use. Few journalists could enter the area, their access being restricted by Communist Party of India (Marxist), or CPI(M), security checkpoints. Two people from a news channel were briefly abducted.

After the 14 March killings, volunteer doctors visited the Nandigram health centre, the district hospital at Tamluk and the SSKM Hospital and compiled a report. In a press release, West Bengal governor Gopal Krishna Gandhi criticized his government's handling of the Nandigram incident.

The scale of the action stunned the state, and the All India Trinamool Congress estimated the death toll at 50. West Bengal Minister of Public Works Kshiti Goswami of the Revolutionary Socialist Party (RSP) said that 50 people were taken to hospital, but it was impossible to determine how many were dead. CPI(M) members and supporters, and their families, were driven out of the area and their houses reportedly burnt by the BUPC. A week after the 14 March clashes, The Hindu estimated that about 3,500 persons had been displaced into relief camps as a result of BUPC threats.

The CPI(M) adopted the position that land would not be acquired without the consent of the people of Nandigram. They accused the Jami Raksha Committee, a coalition of activists who opposed land acquisition, of armed attacks on relief camps which led to three deaths, a series of murders and a gang rape. Amnesty International expressed concern that the West Bengal government had not taken the steps necessary to ensure that all persons under its jurisdiction were protected from forced eviction and displacement and those who were forcibly displaced were ensured the minimum essential levels of food, shelter, water and sanitation, health care and education, with the right to voluntary return or resettlement and reintegration.

The proposed SEZ was shelved after the 14 March police action. On 3 September, chief minister Buddhadeb Bhattacharjee expressed the government's preference for the sparsely populated island of Nayachar, 30 kilometres (19 mi) from Haldia, to set up the chemical hub.

CPI(M) cadres allegedly molested and raped 300 women and girls during the Nandigram violence.

=== November 2007 violence ===
A new round of violence occurred in November 2007 as the villagers who were displaced by the CPI(M) cadres returned home. The return of the villagers was marred by violence between the ruling party cadres the locals in Nandigram. The CPI(M) defended the violence, with its state chairman calling it "a new dawn" and the chief minister describing it as "paying (the BUPC, Trinamool and the maoists) back in their own coin".

On 12 November 2007, the National Human Rights Commission directed the West Bengal chief secretary to submit a report on conditions in Nandigram within 10 days. Film directors Aparna Sen and Rituporno Ghosh announced that they would boycott the Kolkata International Film Festival in protest of the renewed violence. Sen said, "Nandigram has become a slaughter house with blood being shed every day. CPI(M) might be at the helm of affairs but the state still belongs to us".

Parliament held an urgent discussion of Nandigram on 21 November 2007, suspending the regular question-hour sessions after two days of complete suspension of proceedings due to heated debates between CPI(M) and opposition-party members in both houses. CPI(M) was alienated in the issue by all the other ruling United Progressive Alliance allies considering the fierce nationwide sentiments against the massacre.

=== 2008 violence ===
In May 2008, fresh violence broke out between BUPC and CPI(M) supporters. Both sides exchanged fire and hurled bombs at each other. On 5 May, CPI(M) supporters stripped three female BUPC activists after the women refused to join a CPI(M) rally. The government ordered a CID West Bengal investigation of the incident. CPI(M) leaders denied the allegation, saying that it was part of a defamation campaign by political rivals. Union Information and Broadcasting Minister Priyaranjan Dasmunsi demanded that the panchayat polls, scheduled for 11 May, be postponed due to the unrest. Aparna Sen, along with a number of intellectuals from Kolkata, advocated the transfer of the officer in charge at Nandigram because of reported partisan behaviour.

== Response ==
Long-time West Bengal finance minister and CPI(M) leader Ashok Mitra criticized the government and his party, accusing the party's leadership of hubris and calling the CPI(M) "a wide-open field of flatterers and court jesters" dominated by "anti-socials". According to an Indian Express editorial, the party machinery had become the "sword arm of an industrialization policy that involves settling complicated property rights issues." Some of the men who fired at the villagers but were not police officers were later caught by security forces were claimed (by TMC) to be working for the CPI(M).

Novelist Sunil Gangopadhyay, friend of Chief Minister Buddhadeb Bhattacharjee, felt that industry was necessary but the state's violence was barbarous. Social activist Medha Patkar visited Nandigram on 7 December 2006 to protest the land acquisition.

== Electoral response ==
The electorate of Nandigram reacted against the government's policy of industrialization through farmland acquisition. For the first time since the Left Front government came to power, the opposition gained control of the East Midnapore zilla parishad by winning 35 out of 53 seats on 11 May 2008. The results were:

- All India Trinamool Congress: 35
- Socialist Unity Centre of India (Communist) (SUCI): 1
- Communist Party of India (Marxist) (CPI(M)): 14
- Communist Party of India (CPI): 2
- Democratic Socialist Party (Prabodh Chandra) (DSP): 1

Trinamool candidates won all four seats of the Nandigram I and II blocks. Sheikh Sufian (a BUPC leader backed by the Trinamool) defeated the rival CPI(M) candidate Ashok Jana by over 13,000 votes, and Pijush Bhunia (another Trinamool leader) defeated CPI(M) zonal-committee secretary Ashok Bera by over 2,100 votes.

In the 2011 legislative-assembly election, then incumbent chief minister Buddhadeb Bhattacharjee lost his seat and the Left Front lost power after 34 years. Mamata Banerjee and the All Indian Trinamool Congress used the Singur and Nandigram issues and their slogan, Ma Mati Manush, in their campaigns. Firoza Bibi of the All India Trinamool Congress (whose son was killed amidst the violence) won the Nandigram assembly by-election with a margin of 39,551 votes, defeating Left Front candidate Paramananda Bharati.

== See also ==
- Maoist involvement during Nandigram protests
