= Maoist involvement in the Nandigram violence =

Aspect of 2007–08 incidents in India

The 2007–2008 Nandigram violence was one of the major incidents which saw an alleged involvement of Maoists or more precisely the cadres, armed activists and guerrillas of Communist Party of India (Maoist). Trouble started after the Government of West Bengal led by Left front tried to acquire the agricultural land in Nandigram to allow Indonesia's Salim Group to set up a hub for chemical industries. Buddhadeb Bhattacharjee, the then chief minister of West Bengal, accused the Maoists for the violence during the Nandigram. Afterwards, they made a report that was submitted to the then Prime Minister Manmohan Singh. Afterwards in 2014, CPI (Maoists) confirmed that they were active during the Nandigram protests and termed it as "revolutionary people’s agitation".

== Insurgency, arms dealing and militant involvement ==
According to the West Bengal CID report, Maoists had set up base in Nandigram during December 2006, which was later confirmed by captured Maoist leader Madhusudan Mondal. The Maoists firstly collected villagers under Bhoomi Raksha Committee and built up their cadres. Afterwards they started to deal and supply arms to the villagers and the activists of Bhoomi Raksha Committee as well as TMC-led Bhumi Uchhed Pratirodh Committee and taught them to use the arms and also explosives. Initially they used muskets, pipe-guns and homemade bombs. There were about 200 armed persons in Nandigram including Naxals and were shipping arms and explosives using the canals leading in from the Bay of Bengal. The villagers of Sonachura block of Nandigram confirmed that during the Nandigram protests, more than 50 young people were taken and trained with arms in Jharkhand and Chhattisgarh. As per findings of IB, the Maoists were organising training camps in Jharkhand and using the state’s borders with Orissa to create violence in Nandigram. Bhangabera, the border of Nandigram was place of frequent tension and violence. Senior police officers also acknowledged that rebels were active in the coastal belt of the district. Raj Kanojia, IG (law & order) and additional director general, CID, said the police were aware of the presence of the Maoists in Nandigram and their tries to organise locals.

During heavy protests in May 2007, several vehicles containing relief materials and many vehicles containing the emblem of a particular religious organization used to enter Nandigram every week. Both vehicles contained sophisticated arms and ammunition. On parts of the roads they created deep dug trenches that helped the Maoists in stopping the Police and media from entering the place. These also come in handy for them take positions while resisting security forces. The committee activists destroyed other connecting roads to Nandigram and built the trenches at six major entry points Ranichak, Tekhali bridge, Taptatti Canal, Giribazar Pool, Talibhata and Bhangabera having installed high intensity explosives. Special action squad teams were also placed at Garchakraberia, Sonachura and Satengabazar equipped with mortars, self loading rifles, double barrel guns, country-made pistols and muskets. In the name of student of Jadavpur University, members of a Naxalite student’s union was entrusted with the responsibility of spreading propaganda against CPI(M). Temporary workshop had been set up in Sonachura to make country-made single-shooter pistols. According to DNA, a dozen 40-member special action squads had been formed, each of which is under two joint-commanders from the Trinamool and Maoist sides.

The intelligence report says, in October 2007, a group of six Maoist explosives and firearms specialists had reached Nandigram to train the activists. All six members of the group were in the most-wanted category, explosives and firearms specialists, with several cases of murder against them. The six-member team includes wanted Maoists like Ranjit Pal, Gauranga Chakraborty and Sangita Pal, who have multiple murder cases and wanted for many insurgency activities in the districts of West Midnapore, Bankura and Purulia. Those Maoists guerrillas were supplying arms and ammunition with minimum cost to BUPC, which includes AK47 rifles, Stengun, self loading rifles (SLRs) over 60 mortars of various ranges, high range mortars, landmines and most importantly detonator-connected high intensity explosive Neogel 90. In a mid-night three hours operation Maoists triggered off improvised explosive devices (IED) and set on fire CPI(M) panchayat office in Baita village neighbouring Nandigram in West Midnapore. In Bhangabera house of a CPI(M) worker was fired after he was killed. CPI(M) accused over 1500 CPI(M) families compelled to leave their homes, are unable to get back to Nandigram. People in Hazrakata complained about the Maoist presence in their areas. Maoist posters threatening CPI(M) leaders were found in the village recently.

As per a report submitted by the IB to the home department, a team of around eight most-wanted Maoist guerrillas had re-entered Nandigram in February 2008 to resurrect the terror and bloodshed. The team was led by a heavyweight leader of the CPI (Maoist), known as Narayan in guerrilla circles, then acting WB state secretary of the CPI (Maoist), after Himadri Sen Roy alias Somen was captured by West Bengal CID. The gang blocked and damaged many connecting roads to Nandigram. That time, the then Chief minister of West Bengal was to visite Nandigram. The re-entry of the Maoists created by fresh incidence of violence. The IB added that Narayan was organising locals in Nandigram, to strengthen his own position in the party and to spread maximum propaganda, by protesting Somen’s arrest.

On 9 December 2014, CPI (Maoists), Dandakaranya Special Zonal Committee, Maharashtra division released a two page pamphlet, where they confirmed that they were active during the Singur and Nandigram protests and openly claimed credit it terming as "revolutionary people’s agitation".

== Leaders ==
In March 2008, West Bengal CID arrested then state secretary of CPI (Maoist) Himadri Sen Roy alias Somen from a suburban railway station in North 24 Parganas district. After that, Narayan, who was slated to be the next acting state secretary of the CPI(Maoist), was wanted and searched both by West Bengal and Jharkhand for his involvement in various Naxal insurgency activities.

Ranjit Pal, a frontline Maoist commander, and his wife Jharna Giri, who surrendered in 2017 said, that they operated Nandigram during 2007 violence. According to the Police, after Maoist leader Kishanji was shot in an encounter, Ranjit Pal was running the Maoist activities in the area by recruiting and strengthening the Maoist cadre in the area.

One of the most wanted and top Maoist leader was Venkatesh Reddy namely Deepak, who was a close associate of CPI(Maoist) polit bureau member Kishanji and also a member of the Maoist Central Military Commission. He focused for Nandigram, Khejuri and Kolkata for last three to four years. He was active in West Bengal for the last 10 years and surrounding areas of the city for about 15 years now. Reddy was accused to be connected with several incidents of killing of security personnel and political rivals as well as arson in the Paschim Medinipur, during the protests. He was arrested in 2010 by West Bengal CID accused of several cases of murder, waging war against the country and under the Arms Act.

Madhusudan Mondal, who was the Maoist zonal committee secretary and a close associate of Maoist leader Reddy, who was arrested by the CID on 2 March. According to CID sources, Madhusudan Mondal was instrumental in organising the outfit's base on the city outskirts as well as arrange for funds, he was also main accused of the murder of TMC leader Nishikanta Mondal at Nandigram. Siddhartha Mondal, Sachin Ghoshal, Sanjay Mondal and Rajesh Mondal were other accused, arrested by Police under the Unlawful Activities Prevention Act, 1967.

== Alleged TMC-Maoist links ==
CPI (Maoist) released a single-page statement dated 31 December 2010, where they claimed that there was a "movement-oriented alliance with Trinamool Congress" and Mamata Banerjee was in telephonic contact with the Maoists at that time, for both Singur and Nandigram protests. They also said that they wanted to maintain and strengthen relationship with Banerjee. However, TMC denied those charges, alleging that the statement was planted by CPI(M) to malign their party.

In the 2014 pamphlet, CPI (Maoist) claimed that then Union Railway Minister and Trinamool Congress leader Mamata Banerjee had planned the violent agitations in Singur and Nandigram with help from the Maoists. The Trinamool Congress has, so far, denied this.

According to an intelligence officer, few local TMC leaders approached Maoists of Jharkhand and Andhra Pradesh to fight a proxy battle for them against CPI(M)'s armed goons. TMC rubbished those claims, stating that they had no need to seek help from Maoist-Naxalites of other states and their political rivals were blaming them "only to justify their planned violence." In 2010, the then minister Sisir Adhikari was accused of giving money to a Bangladeshi arms dealer to supply arms to BUPC activists to fight CPI(M) cadres. After some days West Bengal police's CID claimed that the then TMC MP Suvendu Adhikari was supplying arms to Maoists for countering CPI(M) during the Nandigram violence in 2007. Suvendu was accused of supplying over 1,000 rounds of ammunition to the guerillas. Madhusudan Mondal, the Maoist zonal committee secretary at Nandigram, also confessed that Suvendu had supplied arms to the rebels.

== See also ==
- Naxalite–Maoist insurgency
- Nandigram violence
- Communist Party of India (Maoist)
- All India Trinamool Congress
