= Matua (spider) =

Scientific classification
- Kingdom: Animalia
- Phylum: Arthropoda
- Subphylum: Chelicerata
- Class: Arachnida
- Order: Araneae
- Infraorder: Araneomorphae
- Family: Gnaphosidae
- Genus: Matua; Forster, 1979

Type species
- M. valida Forster, 1979

Species
- M. festiva Forster, 1979 – New Zealand; M. valida Forster, 1979 – New Zealand

Genus of spiders

Matua is a genus of South Pacific ground spiders that was first described by Raymond Robert Forster in 1979. As of May 2019 it contains only two species, both found in New Zealand: M. festiva and M. valida.
