= Matua valida =

Conservation status
- Not Threatened (NZ TCS)

Scientific classification
- Kingdom: Animalia
- Phylum: Arthropoda
- Subphylum: Chelicerata
- Class: Arachnida
- Order: Araneae
- Infraorder: Araneomorphae
- Family: Gnaphosidae
- Genus: Matua
- Species: M. valida

Binomial name
- Matua valida Forster, 1979

Species of spider

Matua valida is a species of ground spider endemic to New Zealand.

== Taxonomy ==
This species was described by Ray Forster in 1979 from male and female specimens. The holotype is stored in Otago Museum.

== Description ==
The male is recorded at 6.5mm in length whereas the female is 9.5mm. The carapace is coloured orange yellow. The abdomen is metallic silver.

== Distribution ==
This species is known from Central Otago and surrounding areas in the South Island of New Zealand. It primarily occurs in rocky areas.

== Conservation status ==
Under the New Zealand Threat Classification System, this species is listed as "Not Threatened".
