= Kalyan Ghosh (politician) =

Indian politician

Kalyan Ghosh (born 1961) is an Indian politician from West Bengal. He is a member of the West Bengal Legislative Assembly from Domjur Assembly constituency in Howrah district. He won the 2021 West Bengal Legislative Assembly election representing the All India Trinamool Congress party.

== Early life and education ==
Ghosh is from Domjur, Howrah district, West Bengal. He is the son of late Sukumar Ghosh. He studied Class 12 and passed the examinations conducted by the West Bengal Council for Higher Secondary Education in 1980 and later studied till second year BA at a college affiliated with the University of Calcutta in 1985. He and his wife run their own family business.

== Career ==
Ghosh won from Domjur Assembly constituency representing the All India Trinamool Congress in the 2021 West Bengal Legislative Assembly election. He polled 130,499 votes and defeated his nearest rival and two time MLA, Rajib Banerjee of the Bharatiya Janata Party, by a margin of 42,620 votes.
