= Department of Forests (West Bengal) =

State government department in West Bengal, India

Government department overview
- Jurisdiction: Government of West Bengal
- Headquarters: Aranya Bhavan, Block-LA, 10-A, Sector-III, Salt Lake, Kolkata-700106
- Minister responsible: Manoj Kumar Oraon , Cabinet Minister
- Deputy Minister responsible: Dibakar Gharami , MoS
- Government department executive: Debal Ray, IAS, Additional Chief Secretary
- Website: Official Website

Department of Forests is a department of the Government of West Bengal.

== Ministerial Team ==
This department is located at Arayna Bhawan at Salt Lake, Kolkata. It works for forest and wildlife conservation in West Bengal. Naturally, changes have also been made in the department, in consideration of the present day need of the administration to meet the whole gamut of functions of forest and wildlife management, consolidation of participatory forest management in different agro climatic regions and execution on a very large scale of activities related to social/farm/urban forestry in non-forest areas of the state. In 1974, West Bengal Forest Development Corporation Ltd was established for large scale harvesting of forest produces, creation of new eco-tourism centres, productions and marketing of forest products and such allied activities. The administration of West Bengal Forest Development Corporation Limited at various level is headed by the officers of the Forest Directorate on deputation.

The current Minister in charge is Vacant due to New Govt. of West Bengal Formed on 09 May 2026.
