= Law enforcement in India =

Law and order system of india

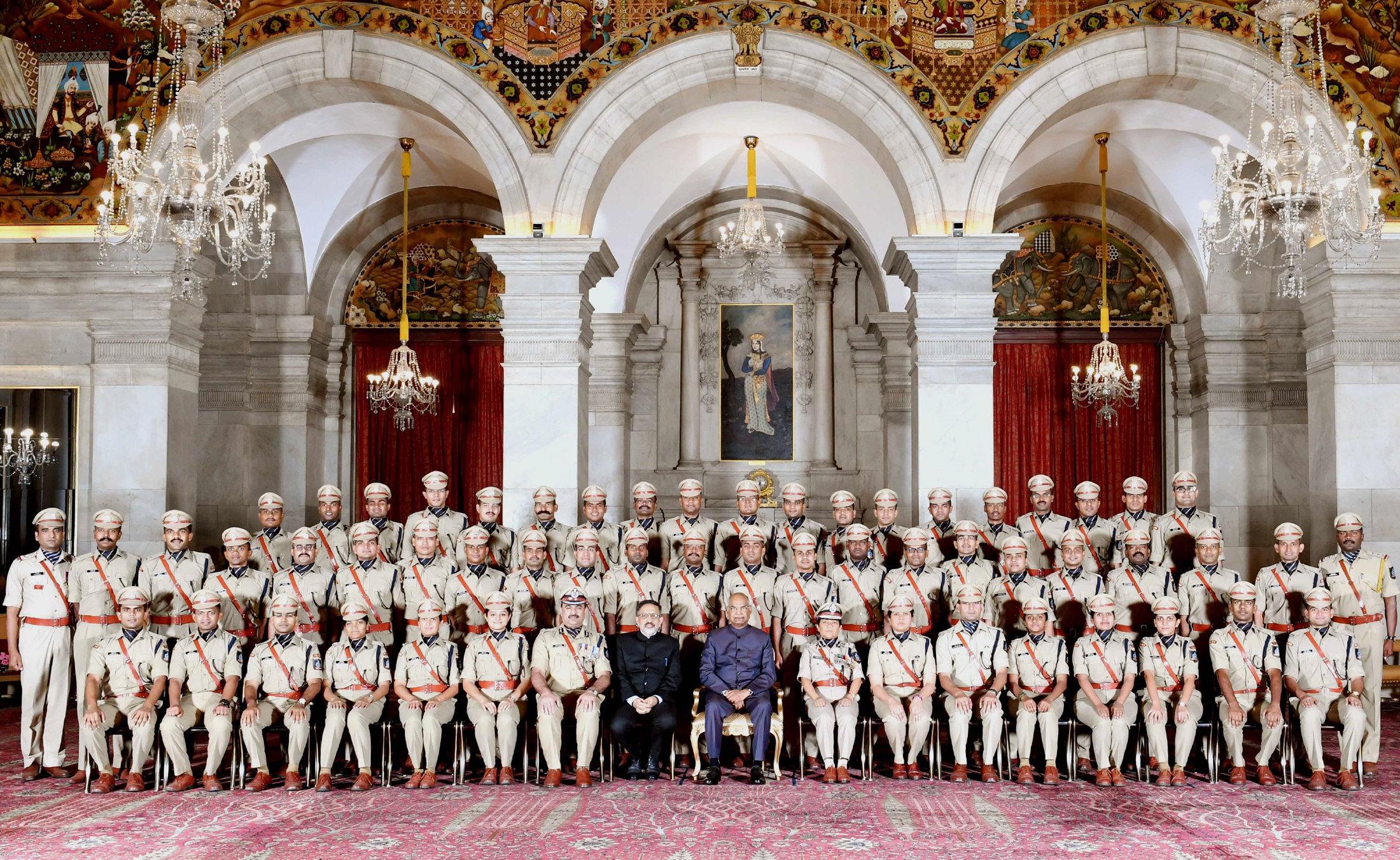
The former President of India Ram Nath Kovind with Indian Police Service Officers at the Rashtrapathi Bhavan in New Delhi, 2018.

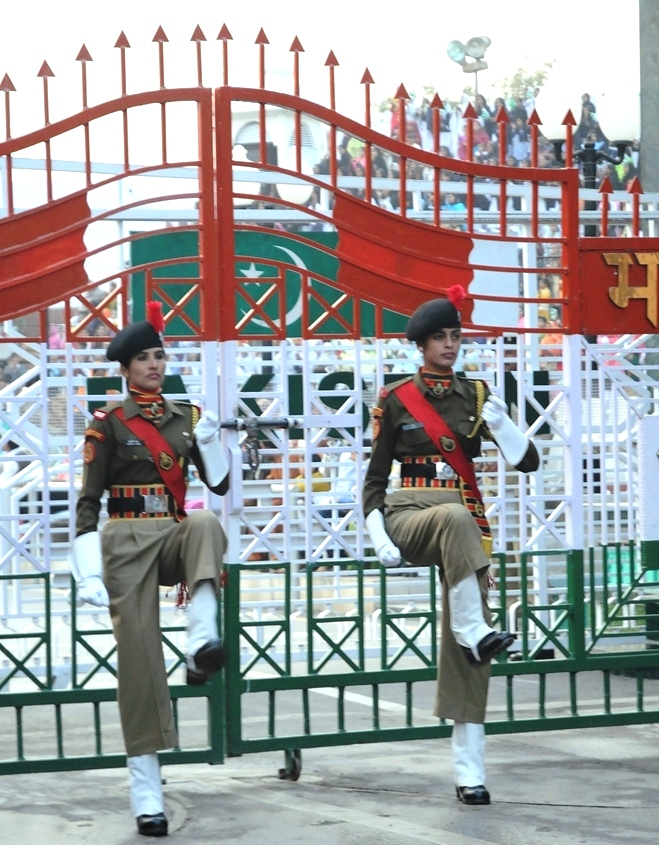
Female security personnel at India-Pakistan border.

Law enforcement in India includes a multi-layered structure with both federal and state/union territory-level agencies, including specialized ones with specific jurisdictions. Unlike many federal countries, the Constitution of India delegates the maintenance of law and order primarily to the states and territories. State governments have the legislative and administrative powers in matters relating to the police, public order, prisons, and prosecution.

Under the Constitution, police and public order are subjects governed by states. Each of the 28 states has its own police force. The center is also allowed to maintain its own police forces to assist the states with ensuring law and order. Therefore, it maintains seven central armed police forces and some other central police organizations for specialized tasks such as intelligence gathering, training, investigation, research and record-keeping. These central armed police forces have limited policing powers as they are meant for specialized roles, such as border guarding and internal security.

The Government of India supports State Governments by providing financial assistance for the modernisation of State Police Forces and by sharing intelligence inputs through central security and intelligence agencies to prevent crime and maintain law and order.

The Ministry of Home Affairs (MHA) is the national ministry responsible for internal security, domestic intelligence, border management and the coordination of central and state law enforcement agencies in India. It includes Central Armed Police Forces (CAPFs) and Central Police Organizations (CPOs).

Larger metropolitan cities have their own police forces under their respective state police (except the Kolkata Police, which is autonomous and reports to the state's Home Department). The Indian Police Service (IPS) is an All India Civil Service, which provides leadership at senior ranks across state police forces, central armed police forces, central investigative agencies, intelligence and regulatory bodies.

== Central agencies ==
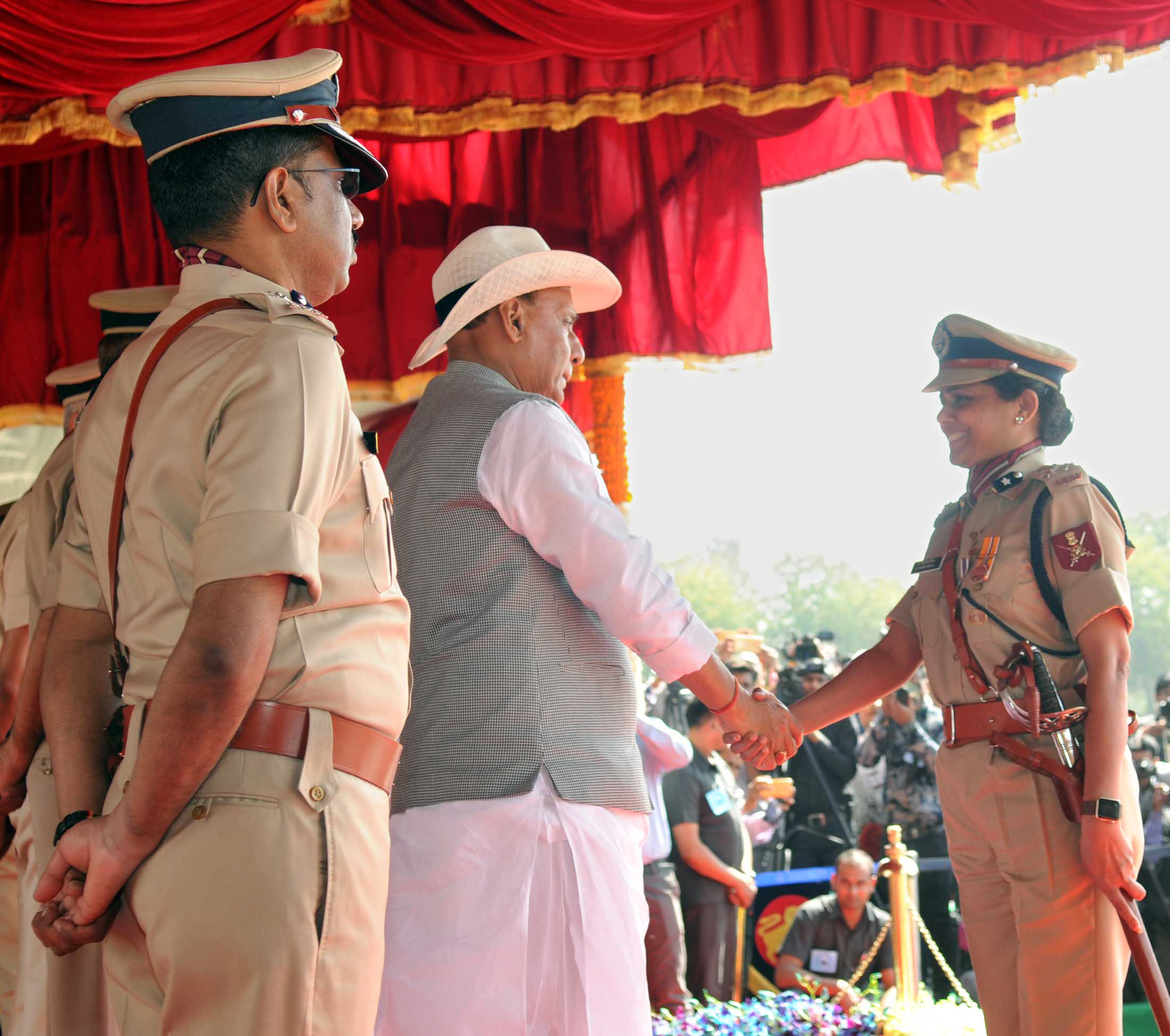
Union Home Minister Rajnath Singh presents medals and awards to CISF personnel and cadets.

The Central Government (Federal government of India) has established a number of Central Police Organizations (CPOs) to fulfill diverse law enforcement and security roles. These CPOs can be broadly categorized into two groups:

Central Armed Police Forces (CAPFs): These are armed police forces responsible for internal security, counter-insurgency operations, and border guarding. They include organizations such as the Assam Rifles, Central Reserve Police Force (CRPF), Border Security Force (BSF), Central Industrial Security Force (CISF), Indo-Tibetan Border Police (ITBP), and Sashastra Seema Bal (SSB).

Central Police Organizations (CPOs): This group comprises organizations that perform specialized functions such as police research and development, criminal investigation, intelligence gathering, police training and forensic science. These include:

- Bureau of Police Research and Development (BPR&D): Conducts research and development in police science and technology.
- Central Bureau of Investigation (CBI): Investigates serious crimes of national importance, corruption and economic crimes.
- Directorate of Coordination of Police Wireless (DCPW): Coordinates wireless communication among police forces.
- Intelligence Bureau (IB): Collects intelligence to counter internal security threats.
- National Investigation Agency (NIA): Specialized counter-terrorism law enforcement agency. It has nationwide jurisdiction and police powers over scheduled offences.
- Narcotics Control Bureau (NCB): Investigation and intelligence of narcotics crimes.
- National Crime Records Bureau (NCRB): Maintains a national database of crime statistics.
- National Institute of Criminology and Forensic Science (NICFS): Provides training and research in criminology and forensic science.
- National Disaster Response Force (NDRF): Responsible for disaster management and emergency services in times of calamities.

In addition, there are police training institutions, such as the Sardar Vallabhbhai Patel National Police Academy (SVPNPA) and the North Eastern Police Academy (NEPA). The Railway Protection Force (RPF) is controlled by the Ministry of Railways. Some intelligence and investigating agencies under the Ministry of Finance also do policing work. They collect and investigate economic offences pertaining to customs, excise, income tax, foreign exchange, money laundering, and narcotics smuggling. Some of these are the Central Economic Intelligence Bureau, the Directorate General of Revenue Intelligence, the Directorate of Enforcement, the Financial Intelligence Unit, the Directorate General of GST Intelligence, and the Directorate General of Income Tax (Investigation).

Most federal law-enforcement agencies are under the Ministry of Home Affairs. The head of each agency is typically an IPS officer. The Constitution entrusts states with the responsibility of maintaining law and order. The central government participates in policing via the Indian Police Service.

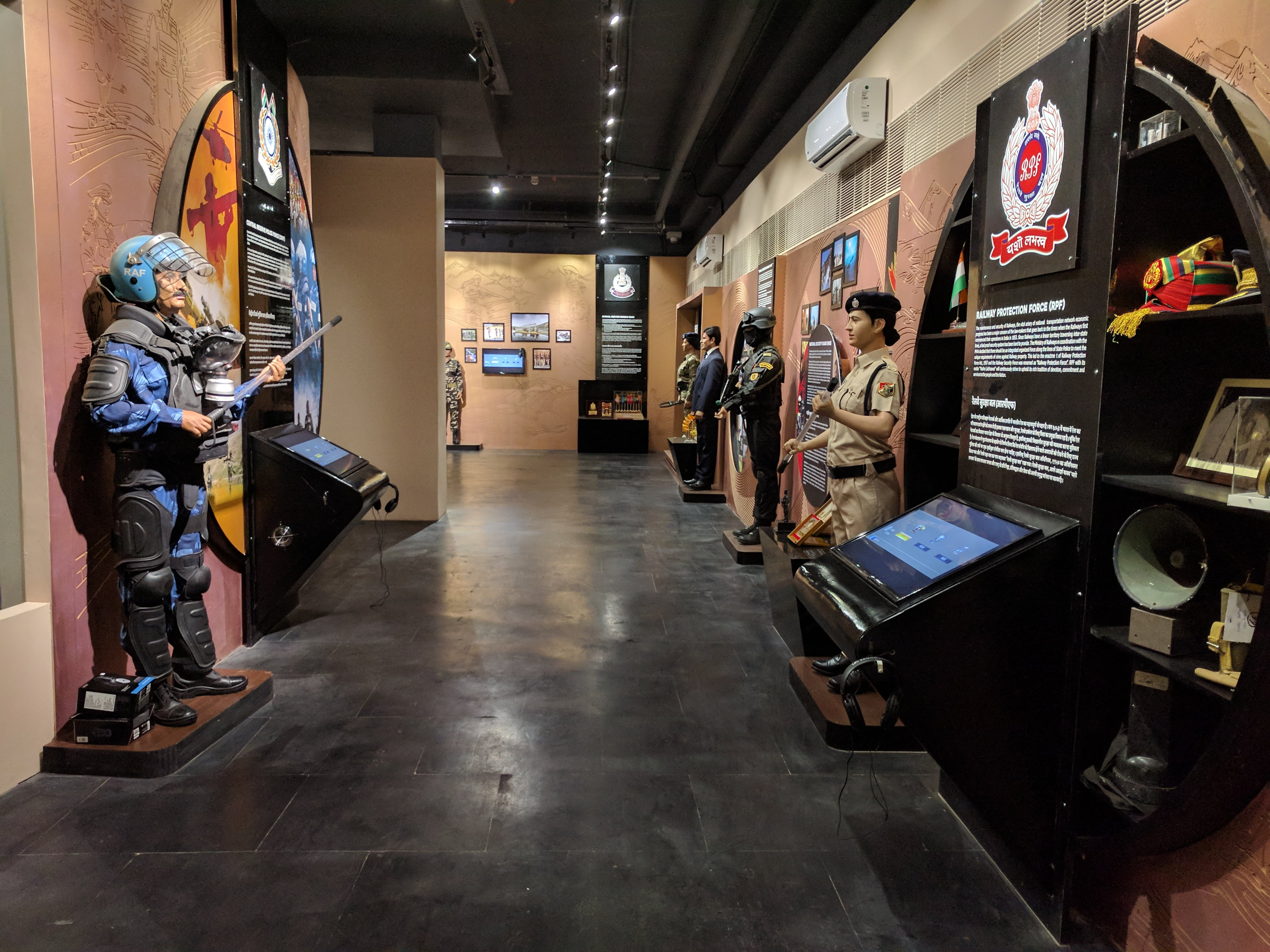
Exhibit of the Railway Protection Force, Rapid Action Force, National Security Guard, and Intelligence Bureau at the National Police Memorial and Museum in New Delhi.

Central police forces can assist a state's police force if requested by a state government. During the 1975–77 Emergency, the Constitution was amended on 1 February 1976 to permit the central government to deploy its armed police forces without state permission. The amendment was unpopular, and the use of the central police forces was controversial. After the Emergency was lifted, the Constitution was again amended in December 1978 to restore the status quo.

=== Central Armed Police Forces ===
==== Border Security Force ====
The Border Security Force (BSF) is responsible for policing India's land borders in peacetime and preventing trans-border crimes. A central police force under the Ministry of Home Affairs, its duties include VIP security, election supervision, guarding vital installations and counter-naxal operations.

The Indo-Pakistani War of 1965, which highlighted the inadequacy of the existing border-management system, led to the formation of the Border Security Force as a unified central armed police force mandated with guarding India's boundary with Pakistan. The BSF's policing capability was used in the Indo-Pakistani War of 1971, against the Pakistani Armed Forces, in areas which were the least threatened. During wartime or when ordered by the central government, the BSF is commanded by the Indian Army; BSF troops participated in the 1971 Battle of Longewala in this capacity. After the 1971 war (which led to the creation of Bangladesh), responsibility for policing the border with Bangladesh was assigned to the force.

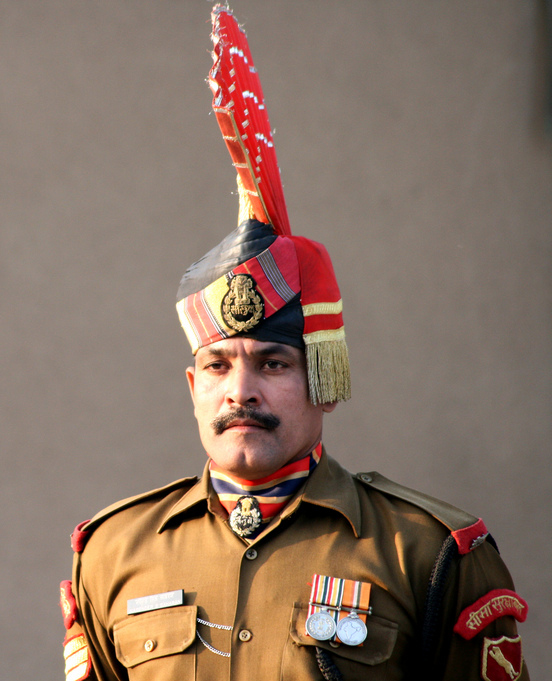
Indian Border Security constable in ceremonial uniform.

Originally charged with guarding India's external borders, the BSF has been tasked with counter-insurgency and counter-terrorism operations. When insurgency in Jammu and Kashmir broke out in 1989 and the Jammu and Kashmir state police and the thinly-deployed Central Reserve Police Force (CRPF) needed extra force to cope with spiraling violence, the central government deployed BSF at Jammu and Kashmir for combating Kashmiri militants.

BSF operates a Tear-Smoke Unit at its academy in Gwalior, Madhya Pradesh, which supplies tear gas and smoke shells for riot prevention to all state police forces. It operates dog squads, and runs the National Dog Training and Research Centre. The BSF, one of several Indian police forces which have its own air and water wings, provides helicopter, dog and other support services to the state police.

==== Central Industrial Security Force ====
The Central Industrial Security Force's (CISF) primary task is to provide industrial security. It guards industrial installations nationwide which are owned by the central government, secures seaports and airports, and provides security for certain non-governmental organizations. The CISF provides security for nuclear-power plants, space installations, mints, oil fields and refineries, heavy-engineering and steel plants, barrages, fertilizer units, hydroelectric and thermal power stations, and other installations partially (or wholly) run by the government.

==== Central Reserve Police Force ====
The Central Reserve Police Force's (CRPF) main objective is to assist states and union territories' law-enforcement agencies in maintaining law and order and containing insurgency. It is deployed as an anti-terrorist unit in several regions, and operates abroad as part of United Nations peacekeeping missions.

==== Indo-Tibetan Border Police ====
The 90,000-member Indo-Tibetan Border Police (ITBP) is responsible for security along the 2,115-kilometre (1,314 mi) Indo-Tibetan border and its surrounding areas. ITBP personnel are trained in maintaining law and order, military tactics, jungle warfare, counter-insurgency, and internal security. They were also deployed to Indian diplomatic missions located in Afghanistan.

==== National Security Guard ====
The National Security Guard (NSG) is a commando unit originally created for counter-terrorism and hostage-rescue missions. Founded in 1986, it is popularly known as the "Black Cats" for its uniform. Like most military and elite-security units in India, it avoids the media and the Indian public is largely unaware of its capabilities and operational details. The NSG draws its core members from the Indian Army, and the balance is support staff from other central police units. An NSG team and a transport aircraft is stationed at Indira Gandhi International Airport in New Delhi, ready to deploy in 30 minutes.

==== Sashastra Seema Bal ====
Sashastra Seema Bal (SSB), founded in 1963, is deployed at the Indo-Nepal and Indo-Bhutan borders. SSB, with over 82,000 personnel, is trained in maintaining law and order, military tactics, jungle warfare, counter-insurgency, and internal security. Its personnel are also deployed to the Intelligence Bureau (IB), Research and Analysis Wing (R&AW), Special Protection Group (SPG), National Security Guard. Officers begin as an assistant commandant (equivalent to deputy superintendent of police on a state force), and retire with the rank of inspector general (IG).

=== Special Protection Group ===
The Special Protection Group (SPG), the central government's executive protection agency, is responsible for the protection of the Prime Minister of India and their immediate family. The force was established in 1985, after the assassination of Indira Gandhi. It provides daily, round-the-clock security throughout India to the present Prime Minister and his family. It functions directly under the Cabinet Secretariat of India.

=== Central investigation and intelligence institutions ===
==== Central Bureau of Investigation ====
The Central Bureau of Investigation (CBI) is India's premier investigative agency, responsible for a wide variety of criminal and national security matters. Often cited as established with the Delhi Special Police Establishment Act, 1946, it was formed by the central government (which controls the Delhi police) with a resolution. Its constitutionality was questioned in the Gauhati High Court Narendra Kumar vs Union of India case on the basis that all areas of policing are exclusive to state governments, and the CBI is a central-government agency. The court ruled that despite the lack of legislation, the CBI is an authorized agency of the central government for national policing. Its ruling was upheld by the Supreme Court of India, which cited the CBI's national importance.

The bureau is controlled by the Department of Personnel and Training in the Ministry of Personnel, Public Grievances and Pensions of the government of India, usually headed by the Prime Minister as the Minister of Personnel, Public Grievances and Pensions. India's Interpol unit, the CBI draws its personnel from IPS officers throughout the country. Specializing in crimes involving high-ranking government officials and politicians, the CBI has also accepted other criminal cases because of media and public pressure (usually due to local-police investigative incompetence).

==== National Investigation Agency ====
The National Investigation Agency (NIA), the central agency combating terrorism, can deal with interstate terror-related crimes without permission from the states. The National Investigation Agency Bill 2008, creating the agency, was moved in Parliament by the Home Minister on 16 December 2008. The NIA was created in response to the 2008 Mumbai attacks as a central counter-terrorism agency. The NIA has nationwide jurisdiction to investigate offenses related to terrorism, national security, and other scheduled offences under the NIA Act of 2008. Also dealing with drug trafficking and currency counterfeiting, it draws its officers from the Indian Police Service (IPS), Indian Revenue Service (IRS), and various State Police Services.

==== Narcotics Control Bureau ====
The Narcotics Control Bureau (NCB) is responsible for anti-narcotics operations nationwide, checking the spread of contraband and the cultivation of drugs. Officers in the bureau are drawn from the IPS and IRS. It functions under administrative control of Ministry of Home Affairs of the Government of India.

=== Enforcement Directorate ===
The Enforcement Directorate (ED) is the law enforcement agency responsible for enforcing economic laws and combating financial crimes. It primarily investigates offenses under the Prevention of Money Laundering Act, 2002 and the Foreign Exchange Management Act, 1999. The agency operates under the Department of Revenue in the Ministry of Finance, Government of India.

=== Income Tax Department ===
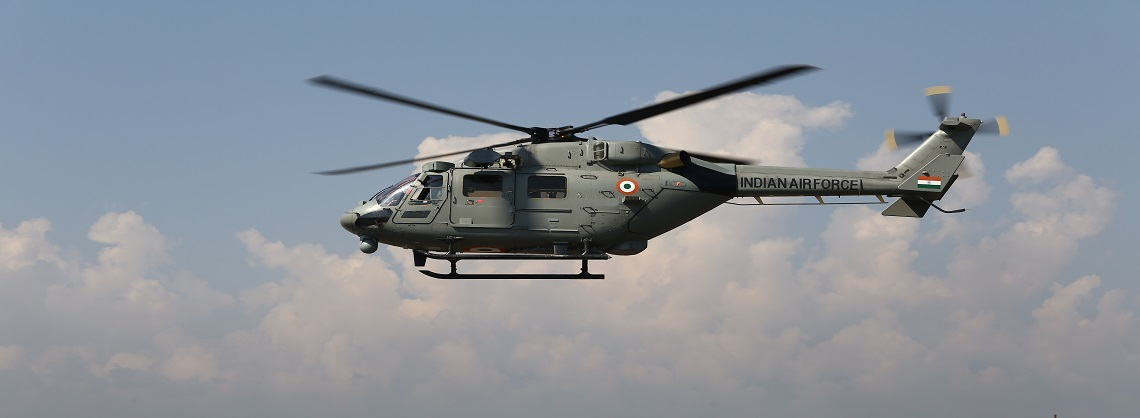
Directorate General of Income Tax Investigation helicopters are supplied by the Indian Air Force.

The Income Tax Department (ITD) is India's premier financial agency, responsible for a wide variety of financial and fiscal matters. The department is controlled by the Department of Revenue in the Ministry of Finance, headed by a minister who reports directly to the prime minister. The Central Board of Direct Taxes (CBDT) is also part of the Department of Revenue. It provides input for policy and planning of direct taxes, and is responsible for the administration of direct-tax laws through the Income Tax Department. The CBDT operates in accordance with the Central Board of Revenue Act, 1963. The board members, in their ex officio capacity, are also a division of the ministry dealing with matters relating to the levy and collection of taxes, tax evasion and revenue intelligence. It is India's official Financial Action Task Force on Money Laundering (FATF) unit. The Income Tax Department draws its staff from Indian Revenue Service officers nationwide, and is responsible for the investigation of economic crimes and tax evasion. Some special agents and agents can carry firearms.

The Directorate of Criminal Investigation (DCI) is headed by the Director General of Intelligence (Income Tax), which was created to address cross-border black money. The DCI conducts unobtrusive investigations of "persons and transactions suspected to be involved in criminal activities having cross-border, inter-state or international ramifications, that pose a threat to national security and are punishable under the direct tax laws." Commissioners of the ITD's intelligence directorate posted in cities such as Delhi, Chandigarh, Jaipur, Ahmedabad, Mumbai, Chennai, Kolkata, and Lucknow will also conduct criminal investigations for the DCI. The ITD's intelligence wing oversees the Central Information Branch (CIB), which has a repository of data on taxpayers' financial transactions.

==== Directorate of Revenue Intelligence ====
The Directorate of Revenue Intelligence (DRI) is an intelligence-based organization responsible for the coordination of India's anti-smuggling efforts. Officers are drawn from the Indian Revenue Service and Group B of the Central Board of Indirect Taxes and Customs.

==== Central Economic Intelligence Bureau ====
The Central Economic Intelligence Bureau (CEIB) is the intelligence agency responsible for gathering information and monitoring the economic and financial sectors for economic offenses and warfare.

==== Directorate General of GST Intelligence ====
The Directorate General of GST Intelligence (DGGI), formerly the Directorate General of Central Excise Intelligence (DGCEI), is an intelligence-based organization responsible for tax evasion cases related to central excise duty and Goods and Service Tax (GST). Officers are drawn from the Indian Revenue Service and Group B of the Central Board of Indirect Taxes and Customs.

==== Bureau of Police Research and Development ====
The Bureau of Police Research and Development (BPRD) was established on 28 August 1970 to modernize the police forces. It researches police issues, including training and the introduction of technology at the central and state levels.

==== National Crime Records Bureau ====
In 1979, the National Police Commission recommended the creation of agency to maintain criminal records and a database shareable at the federal and state levels. The National Crime Records Bureau (NCRB) was established by combining the Directorate of Coordination Police Computers, the Central Fingerprint Bureau, the Data Section of Coordination Division of the Central Bureau of Investigation, and the Statistical Section of the Bureau of Police Research and Development.

=== Central forensic institutions ===
==== Central Forensic Science Laboratory ====
The Central Forensic Science Laboratory (CFSL), a wing of the Ministry of Home Affairs, houses the only DNA repository in South and Southeast Asia. There are seven central forensic laboratories: in Hyderabad, Kolkata, Bhopal, Chandigarh, Pune, Guwahati and New Delhi. CFSL Hyderabad is a centre of excellence in chemical sciences, CFSL Kolkata in biological sciences, and CFSL Chandigarh in the physical sciences. The laboratories are primarily controlled by the ministry's Directorate of Forensic Science (DFS); the New Delhi lab is under the Central Bureau of Investigation, and investigates cases on its behalf.

==== National Institute of Criminology and Forensic Science ====
The National Institute of Criminology and Forensic Science (NICFS) was established on 4 January 1972 at the recommendation of a committee appointed by the University Grants Commission (UGC). In September 1979, the institute became a department of the Ministry of Home Affairs with a full-time director. It is headed by senior Indian Police Service officers. The institute trains in cybercrime investigations, and researches aspects of criminology and forensics (including cyber forensics). It is listed as a science and technology organization by the Department of Science and Technology.

== State police ==
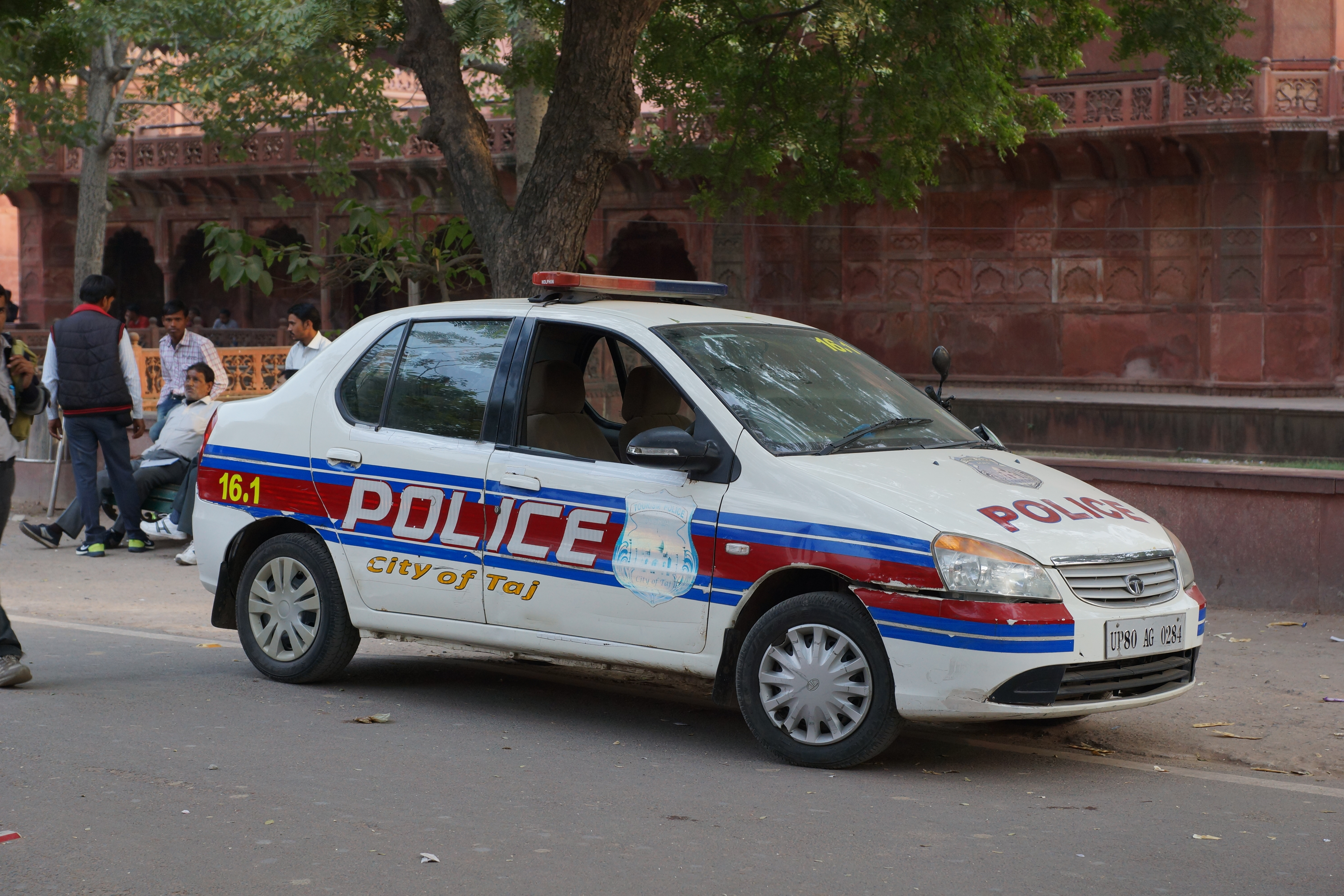
Agra Police Patrol Car

State police forces are organized under the purview of the state governments, with each state and union territory maintaining its own police force. The overarching authority for police matters lies with the state's home department, led by an additional chief secretary or principal secretary, also known as the home secretary, typically an IAS officer. The political head of the state Home Departments is generally the Chief Minister or the Home Minister of the state. The Police Act of 1861 provides the foundational framework for the organization and functioning of police forces in India. While there may be variations in equipment and resources among different state police forces, their organizational structure and operational patterns are generally similar.

Senior police officers answer to the police chain of command, and respond to the general direction of designated civilian officials. In the municipal force, the chain of command runs to the state home secretary rather than the district superintendent or district officials.

=== Organizational structure ===
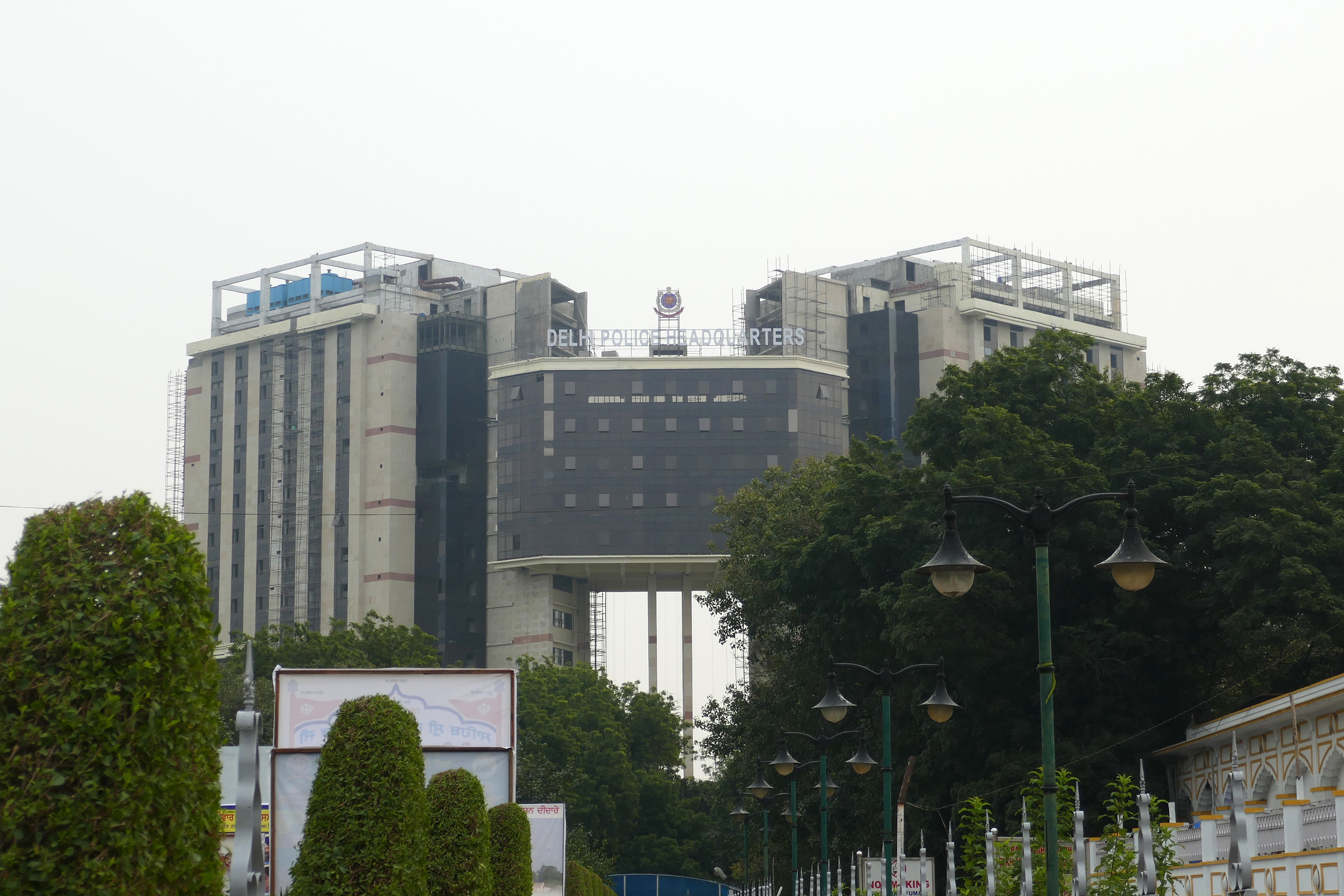
Delhi Police Headquarters

The state police is headed by an IPS officer with the rank of director general of police (DGP), who serves as the head of police force (HoPF). The DGP is assisted by two (or more) additional directors general of police (ADGs). Each ADGP is assigned specific domains of responsibility, such as law and order, crime investigation, intelligence, administration, training, or the command of armed police and other specialized units.

Other DGP rank officers in the state often head autonomous organizations outside the direct control of the DGP/HoPF, such as the state police recruitment board, fire and rescue services, police training academies, vigilance and anti-corruption bureau, prisons department, police housing corporation, and police welfare bureau.

==== Law and order (General police structure) ====
State Police Headquarters
Law and Order Wing
Police Zone
Police Range
Police District
Police Subdivision / Circle
Police Station
Police Outpost

The Law and Order wing of the state police, also known as the Civil Police or General Executive branch, is responsible for routine law enforcement, including maintenance of public order, crime prevention, patrol, and investigation. Organizational structures vary by state, but police forces are generally arranged below the Director General of Police (DGP) into zones, ranges, and districts. Police districts, headed by a Superintendent of Police (SP) or Senior Superintendent of Police (SSP), function as the primary operational units and are subdivided into sub-divisions, circles, and police stations for effective local policing.

A Deputy Superintendent of Police (DySP) supervises police stations at the sub-divisional level and is responsible for district-level special units, functioning under the overall supervision of the Superintendent of Police (SP). A police station is the primary grassroots unit for routine policing and is headed by an Inspector or, in rural areas, a Sub-Inspector, designated as the Station House Officer (SHO). A police station consists of personnel holding the ranks of Sub-Inspector, Assistant Sub-Inspector, Head Constable, and Constable. These officers perform routine policing duties such as patrolling, crime investigation, crime prevention, traffic management, and related functions.

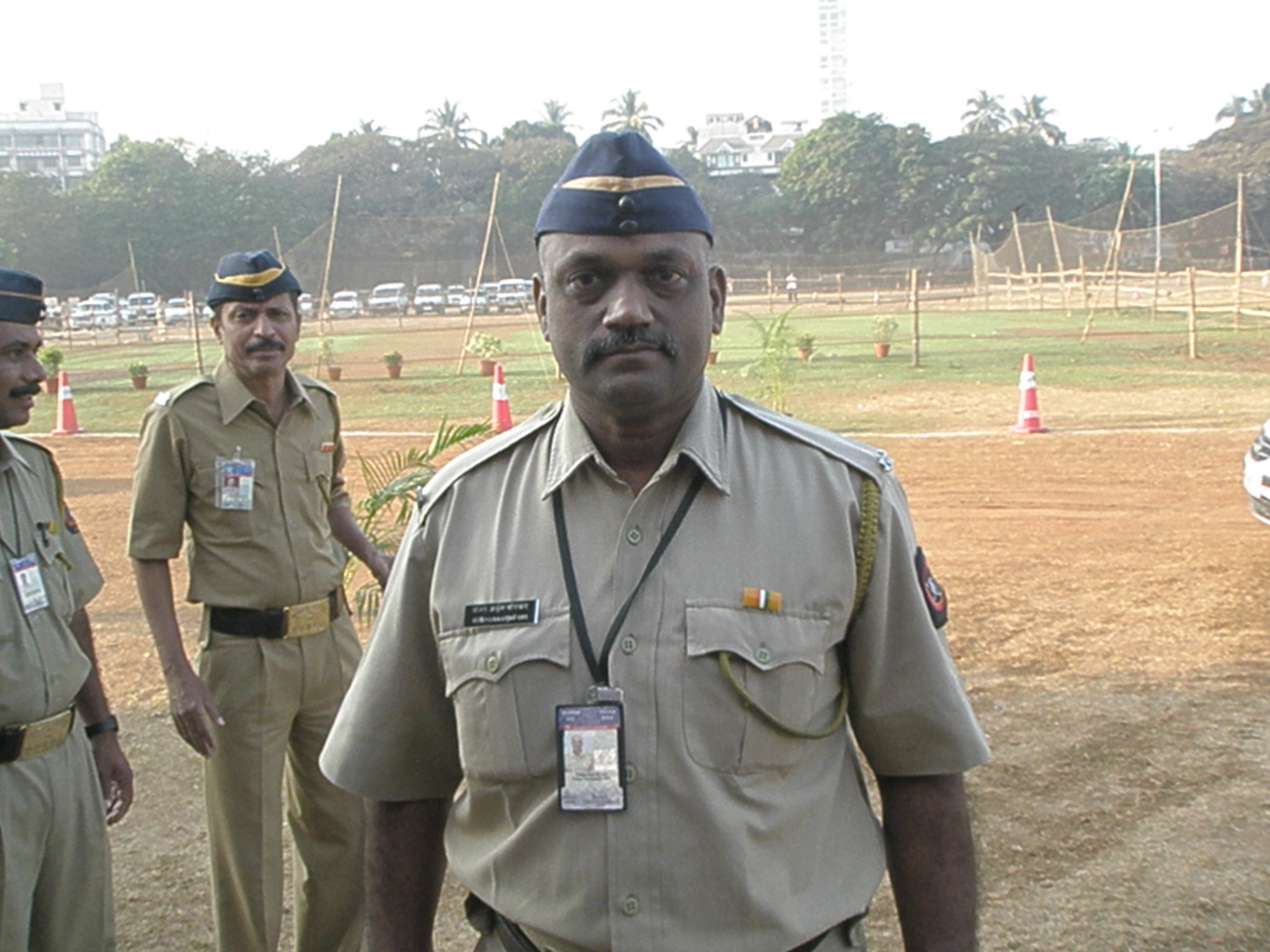
Police Constable in Mumbai

District SPs are not empowered as executive magistrates. The district magistrate/collector (DM, an IAS officer) exercises these powers, which include promulgating Section 144 of the Code of Criminal Procedure (CrPC) and issuing arms licenses. Special units under the civil police—such as mounted police, tourist police, highway police, coastal security, watch and ward, narcotics, women's, and cyber cells—vary in organization across states. They typically operate under the district police or at the state level.

=== Special Units (Other wings/departments) ===
Apart from the general law-and-order wing, state police organizations also maintain a number of specialized departments to handle specific functions. These include the Criminal Investigation Department (CID) or Crime Branch, Intelligence Wing or Special Branch, Police Training Wing, State Armed Police Forces, Police telecommunication, Special Task Force, Anti-Terror Squad, Government Railway Police, State Armed Police Forces, Police Technical Services, Forensic Division, State Crime Records Bureau, and Police Training Directorate, which are generally headed by officers of the rank of Additional Director General of Police (ADG) or Inspector General of Police (IGP).

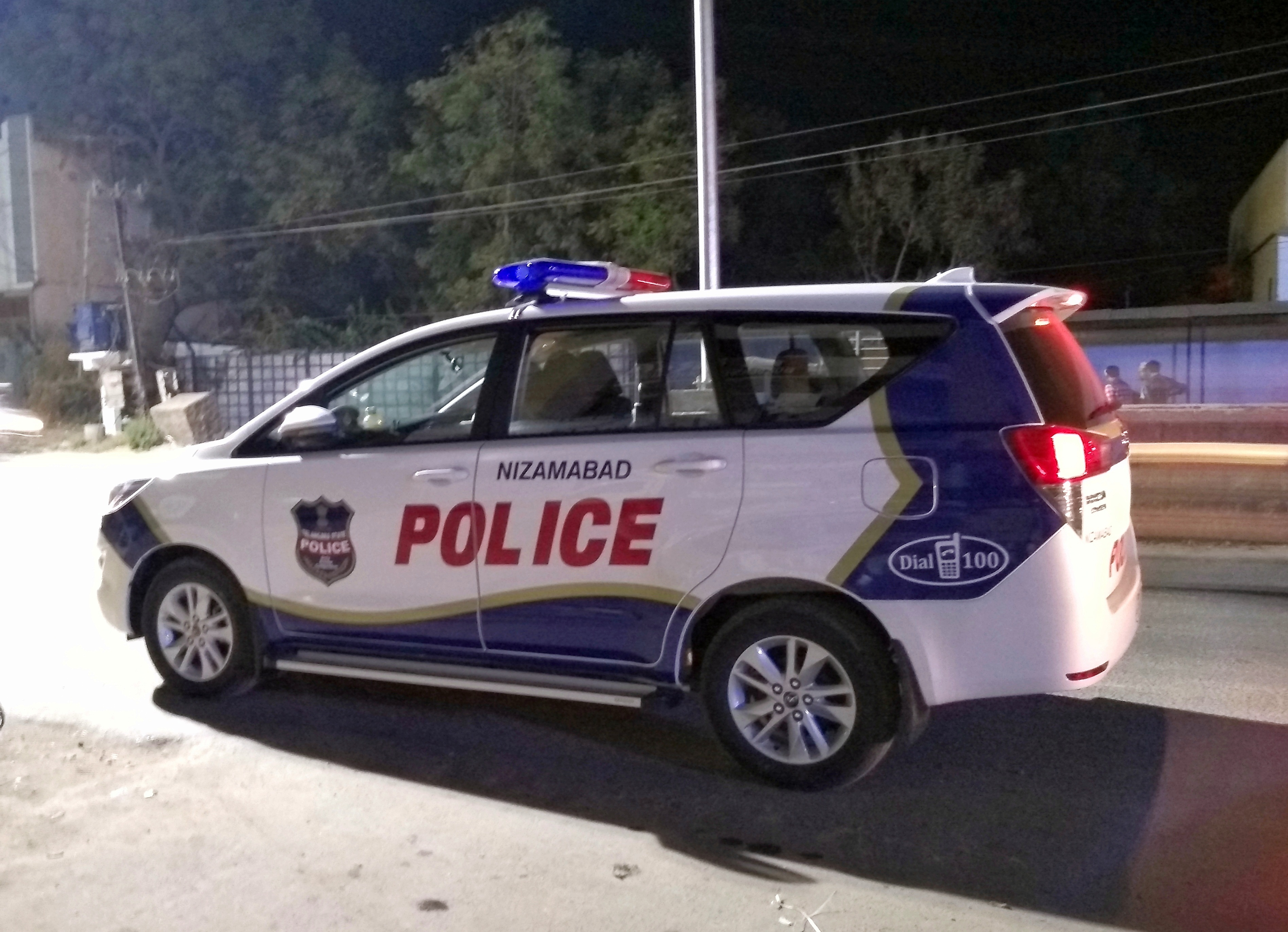
Patrol car of Nizamabad City Police, (Toyota Innova Crysta)

These units include the Crime Branch/CID for investigating complex crimes, the ATS for counter-terrorism operations, and the EOW for investigation of economic offenses. Other specialized units may include Cyber Crime Division for cybercrimes, and Women's Police Stations for crimes against women and children.

==== Government Railway Police ====
The Government Railway Police (GRP) is the security police force that is responsible for policing on the railway stations and trains of Indian Railways. Its duties correspond to those of the District Police in the areas under their jurisdiction, but only on railway property. While Railway Protection Force (RPF) comes under Ministry of Railways, Government of India, GRP comes under the respective state police or UT police.

=== Traffic police ===
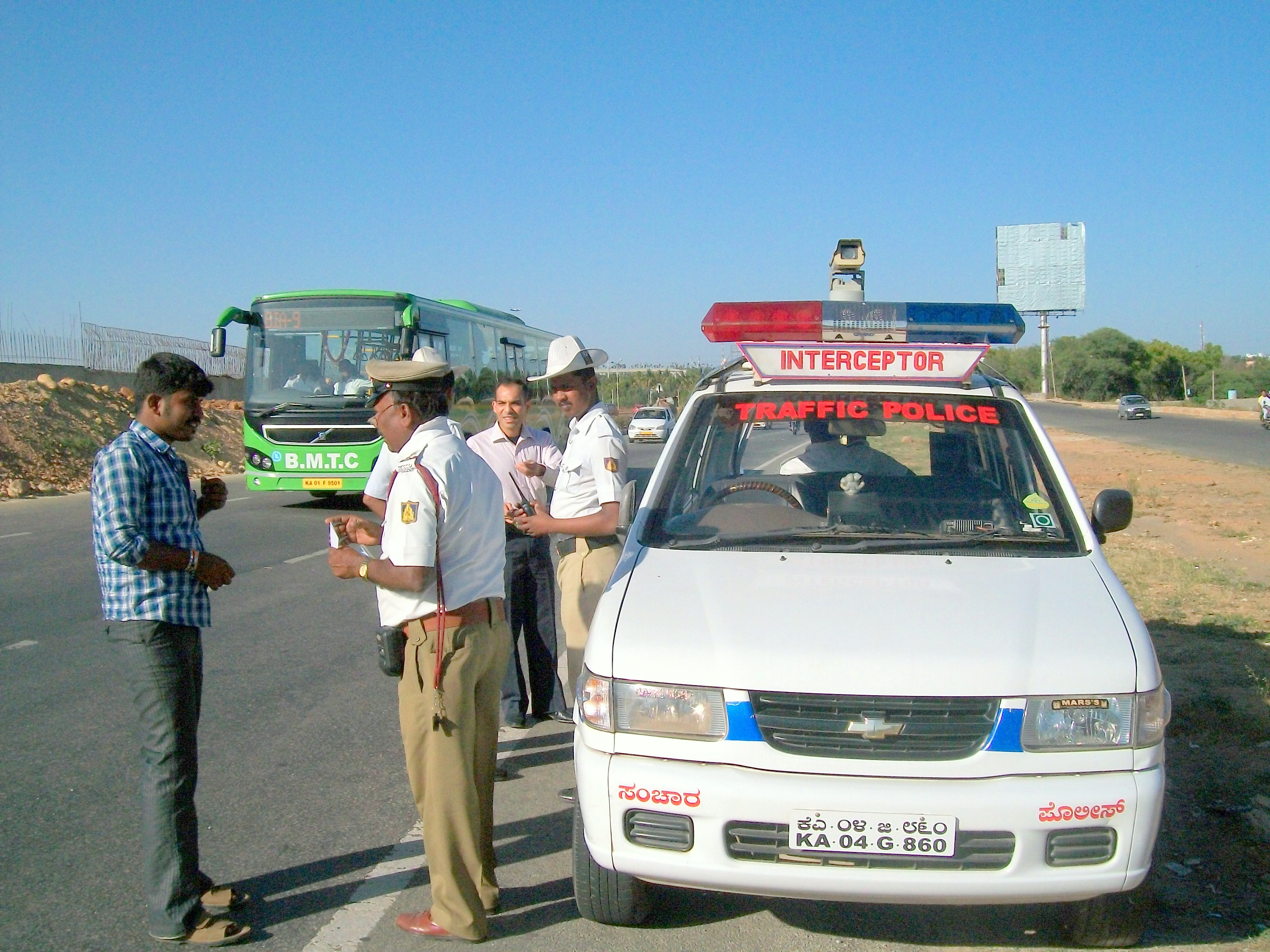
Traffic Police issuing tickets in Bangalore.

The Traffic Police in India is a specialized branch of the state police responsible for traffic enforcement, regulating vehicular movements, ensuring road safety, ensures the smooth movement of vehicles on public roads. They regulate traffic movement, investigate road accidents, issue challans for violations, and promote awareness about road discipline and safety.

Each city or police district has its own Traffic Police unit, headed by officers such as the Deputy Commissioner of Police (Traffic) or Deputy Superintendent of Police (Traffic), depending on the state and city. These units operate through Traffic Police Stations and Traffic Enforcement Units to manage traffic control, law enforcement, and road safety operations.

=== Highway Police / Highway Patrol ===
Several state police departments have formed Highway Patrol Units to maintain law and order, regulate traffic, and ensure safety on highways. Their structure varies across states—some operate under local district police, while others function independently under the state police.

They patrol highways to prevent accidents, assist motorists, respond to emergencies, and curb crimes such as smuggling and highway robbery. The unit operates under the supervision of senior police officers, often in coordination with the local traffic police and local police stations.

=== State Armed Police Forces ===
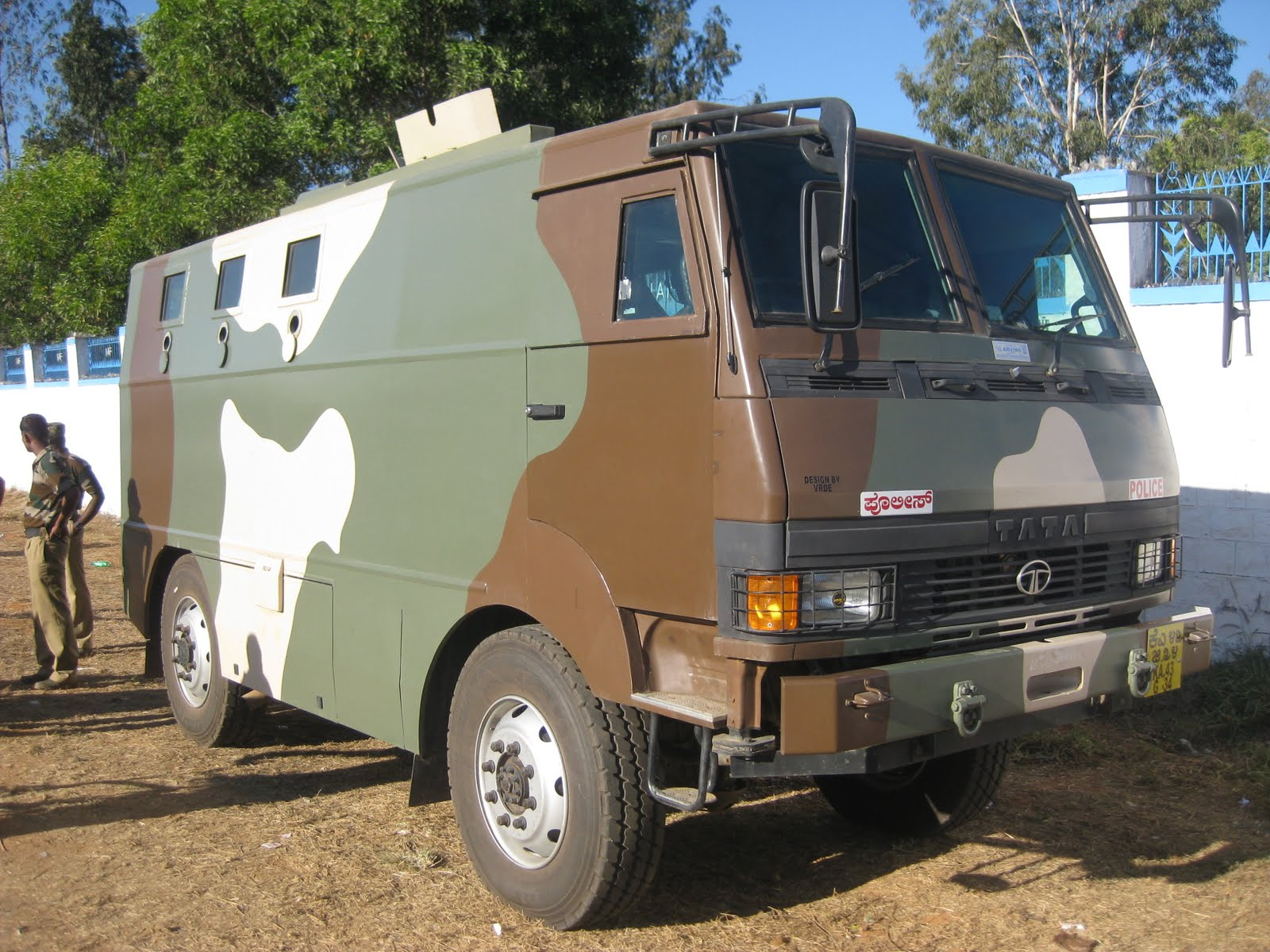
Armed SWAT vehicle of the Karnataka State Police

In most jurisdictions, the police are divided into civil (unarmed) police and armed police contingents. Civil police staff local police stations, register and investigate cases, manage routine complaints, perform traffic control, and conduct patrolling duties. They are typically equipped with lathis (batons in bamboo staffs, sometimes fitted with iron tips).

The armed police are further divided into the district armed police/district armed reserve (DAR) and the State Armed Police Forces (also known in some states as the Provincial Armed Constabulary). District armed police units, organized along the lines of infantry battalions, function under district superintendents of police and are primarily tasked with guard, escort, and riot-control duties. The DAR operates at the district level as a reserve force to support civil police during emergencies.

The State Armed Police Forces function as a mobile armed reserve under state control, deployed for situations requiring greater force. It is under command of an additional director general of police. The State Armed Police Forces are generally organized into battalions commanded by a commandant. The commandant is assisted by deputy commandants, assistant commandants, and other armed police officers, including armed police inspectors, sub-inspectors, and members of the armed police constabulary. These units are stationed at key locations and are activated by senior officers, generally of the rank of Deputy Inspector General or above. They are usually not in day-to-day contact with the public, but are mobilized for duties such as maintaining order during large gatherings (fairs, festivals, elections, sporting events), providing security to VIPs, or responding to communal violence, labor unrest, and insurgency or terrorist activities. Depending on operational requirements, they may be equipped with firearms or only with lathis.

The State Armed Police Forces are often considered analogous to the Central Armed Police Forces and are sometimes referred to as paramilitary forces in unofficial usage. Each state maintains its own armed police contingents under different names, such as the Provincial Armed Constabulary (PAC), Special Armed Police (SAP), or other state-specific designations. These forces serve as the principal armed reserve at the state level, primarily responsible for riot control, counterinsurgency, and other internal security duties.

List of State Armed Police Forces
Name of the State	State Armed Police Forces
Andhra Pradesh	Andhra Pradesh State Special And Reserved Police Force
Arunachal Pradesh	Arunachal Pradesh Armed Police
Assam	Assam Police Battalion
Bihar	Bihar Military Police
Goa	Indian Reserve Battalion
Gujarat	Gujarat State Reserve Police Force
Haryana	Haryana Armed Police
Himachal Pradesh	Indian Reserve Battalion
Jharkhand	Jharkhand Armed Police
Karnataka	Karnataka State Reserve Police Force
Kerala	Kerala Armed Police, Malabar Special Police, Special Armed Police
Madhya Pradesh	Madhya Pradesh Special Armed Police Force (SAF)
Maharashtra	Maharashtra State Reserve Police Force
Manipur	Manipur Rifles & Indian Reserve Battalions
Meghalaya	Meghalaya Armed Police Battalions & Indian Reserve Battalions
Mizoram	Mizoram Armed Police & Indian Reserve Battalions
Nagaland	Nagaland Armed Police & Indian Reserve Battalions
Odisha	Odisha Special Armed Police
Punjab	Punjab Armed Police
Rajasthan	Rajasthan Armed Constabulary
Sikkim	Sikkim Armed Police
Tamil Nadu	Tamil Nadu Special Police
Telangana	Telangana State Special Police
Tripura	Tripura State Rifles & Indian Reserve Battalions
Uttar Pradesh	Uttar Pradesh Provincial Armed Constabulary
Uttarakhand	Uttarakhand Provincial Armed Constabulary
West Bengal	West Bengal Armed Police Forces, Eastern Frontier Rifles & Kolkata Armed Police

Recruits receive about ₹ 30,000 per month. Opportunities for promotion are limited because of the system of horizontal entry into higher grades. A 2016 article on the Maharashtra state police describes why reform is needed.

== Metropolitan police (policing at cities) ==
Some major metropolitan cities use the police commissionerate system, headed by a police commissioner. Demand for this system is increasing as it gives police a free hand to act and take control of any situation. 68 large cities and suburban areas currently have this system in India.

Even during the colonial era, the presidency towns of Calcutta, Bombay and Madras had commissionerate system. Unlike in some countries where policing is handled by local governments, in India it is mainly the responsibility of state governments. Police forces across the country operate under state control, and even in large metropolitan cities, they are governed by the state rather than local municipal authorities. A police commissionerate is constituted by the respective state government and may consists either a single police district or multiple police districts, depending on factors such as urbanization, population, and administrative and operational requirements.

The police force in a city is headed by a Commissioner of Police (CP), who is a senior Indian Police Service (IPS) officer. The rank of the Commissioner, generally above the level of Deputy Inspector General (DIG), is determined by the respective state government. Depending on state provisions (and in the case of Delhi, the Government of India), the Commissioner may or may not be vested with executive magisterial powers. The commissioner is assisted by additional or special commissioners, as well as deputy and assistant commissioners of police, depending on the administrative structure prescribed by the state government.

A Police Commissioner may be vested with executive magisterial powers under state law, allowing them to act as an executive magistrate. These powers generally include enforcing Section 163 of the BNSS to prevent unlawful assemblies, issuing and regulating arms licenses, granting permissions for public events and processions, and maintaining public order through preventive and emergency measures. The scope of these powers varies by state, with some Commissioners exercising full magisterial authority while in other areas certain powers remain with the District Magistrate (Collector). In Kerala, police commissionerates exist in major cities, but the state government has not conferred executive magisterial powers on the police due to opposition. Police commissionerates are subordinate to the state police except for the Kolkata Police, which independently reports to the Home Department of Government of West Bengal.

== State agencies ==
In addition to state police, there are several other law enforcement agencies under the control of state governments in India. These agencies are specialized in their respective areas of law enforcement. Here are some examples:

=== State Excise and Prohibition Departments ===
The State Excise Department is responsible for enforcing laws related to the production, sale, and consumption of alcoholic beverages and other controlled substances within the state. They regulate and monitor the licensing, taxation, and distribution of such substances. They are responsible for the enforcement of Narcotic Drugs and Psychotropic Substances Act (NDPS) and various state laws relating to narcotics. Here is a list of some State Excise Departments in India:

- Andhra Pradesh Prohibition and Excise Department
- Kerala Excise
- Telangana Excise
- Department of Excise & Taxation, Haryana
- Karnataka Excise
- Tamil Nadu Prohibition and Excise Department

=== State Forest Departments ===
State Forest and Wildlife Departments are responsible for the protection, conservation, and management of forests and wildlife within their respective states. Their functions include enforcement of forest and wildlife laws, prevention of illegal logging and poaching, and promotion of sustainable management of forest resources.

Examples of State Forest Departments include:

- Andhra Pradesh Forest Department
- Kerala Forest and Wildlife Department
- Tamil Nadu Forest Department
- Maharashtra Forest Department
- Karnataka Forest Department
- Forests Department, Haryana
- Department of Forest and Wildlife (Punjab)
- Telangana Forest Department
- Uttarakhand Forest Department
- Environment and Forests Department (Assam)
- Environment and Forests Department (Arunachal Pradesh)

At the state level, forest administration is headed by officers of the Indian Forest Service (IFS), an All India Service responsible for implementing the National Forest Policy and ensuring ecological stability through sustainable management of natural resources. Key posts in state forest departments, such as Divisional Forest Officer, Conservator of Forests, Chief Conservator of Forests, and Principal Chief Conservator of Forests, are held by IFS officers. The senior-most officer in a state is designated as the Head of Forest Forces (HoFF).

Field staff, including Forest Rangers and Forest Guards, are responsible for patrolling forest areas, preventing forest offenses, and assisting in wildlife protection and management. Forest personnel often operate in challenging conditions, including encounters with armed poachers and wildlife. Reports have highlighted issues such as inadequate equipment and risks faced by forest guards in the line of duty.

=== State Transport Departments ===
State Motor Vehicles Departments (MVDs) or Transport Departments are government agencies responsible for the administration and regulation of motor vehicles and road transport within each state in India. These departments are primarily focused on implementing and enforcing the provisions of the Motor Vehicles Act, 1988, and other relevant laws pertaining to motor vehicles. They are tasked with the enforcement of Motor Vehicles Act and state rules. Each state has its own State Motor Vehicles Department, often headed by a Commissioner of Transport or a similar administrative position.

- Ministry of Transport (Andhra Pradesh)
- Kerala Motor Vehicles Department
- Department of Transport (Tamil Nadu)

=== Anti-corruption Bureaus (ACBs) ===
Vigilance Departments or Anti-Corruption Bureaus are specialized law enforcement agencies under state governments, that are responsible for combating corruption and promoting integrity within the government and public administration. These departments primarily focus on preventing, detecting, and investigating corruption-related offenses involving public officials.

- Anti-Corruption Bureau (Andhra Pradesh)
- Kerala Vigilance and Anti-Corruption Bureau (VACB)
- Anti-Corruption Bureau (Maharashtra) (ACB)

== Jurisdiction ==
=== Federal ===
==== Central Bureau of Investigation (CBI) ====
The Central Bureau of Investigation (CBI) is a premier investigating agency of the Government of India. It derives its power to investigate from the Delhi Special Police Establishment Act (DSPE), 1946. The Jurisdiction of CBI extends across India, but requires prior consent from state governments for investigations within their territories.

Executive officers of the CBI, of the rank of Sub-Inspector and above, are empowered to exercise all the powers of a police officer in charge of a police station for the purpose of investigation in the concerned area. The CBI can investigate crimes committed against central government employees, such as bribery, corruption, or misconduct. The CBI has the authority to investigate cases with inter-state or international implications, including organized crime, terrorism, human trafficking, money laundering, and other transnational offenses. The CBI can investigate offenses listed in the DSPE Act, such as those under the Prevention of Corruption Act and other central laws. The CBI can also investigate cases referred to it by courts or the central government or the state governments.

The CBI requires the consent of state governments to investigate cases within their territories. This consent can be either general or specific. While general consent allows the CBI to investigate cases without seeking permission for each case, specific consent is required for individual cases. As of 2024, 8 states have withdrawn general consent to the CBI, limiting its ability to freely investigate cases in these states. These states include Punjab, Jharkhand, Kerala, West Bengal, Telangana, Meghalaya, Karnataka and Tamil Nadu.

==== National Investigation Agency (NIA) ====
The National Investigation Agency (NIA) is a specialized counter-terrorism law enforcement agency in India. Unlike the CBI, it has nationwide jurisdiction, meaning it can investigate cases across the country without requiring the consent of individual state governments. It functions under the Union Ministry of Home Affairs.

The NIA's jurisdiction extends to offenses that threaten India's sovereignty, security, and integrity, as well as those that impact India's relations with other nations. The agency is empowered to investigate various crimes, including terrorism, bomb blasts, aircraft and ship hijackings, human trafficking, counterfeiting, and cyberterrorism. The 2019 amendment to the NIA Act further expanded its jurisdiction to cover a wider range of offenses.

==== Enforcement Directorate (ED) ====
The Enforcement Directorate (ED) is responsible for enforcing economic laws and combating financial crimes. The ED has the power to investigate and prosecute cases related to money laundering, including tracing and attaching assets derived from criminal activities under Prevention of Money Laundering Act, 2002. The ED enforces Foreign Exchange Management Act and regulations and can investigate and impose penalties for violations of these rules. The ED's jurisdiction extends across India and it has powers to investigation and arrest, prosecution, attachment of property and confiscation of property.

==== Railway Protection Force (RPF) ====
RPF is a security force of Indian Railways that functions under the Ministry of Railways. RPF is primarily responsible for the protection and security of railway property, passengers and passenger areas.

It has the power to inquire, search, arrest, and prosecute offenses committed under the Railway Property (Unlawful Possession) Act 1966 and the Railways Act, 1989. The general policing powers on railway stations and trains lie with the respective State's Railway Police, known as Government Railway Police (GRP). The GRP has significant powers such as maintaining order, investigating crimes, and preventing crime within the railway stations and trains.

If the RPF encounters a fight or any other criminal activity on a moving train or railway premises, they typically hand over the accused individuals to the GRP for further investigation and legal action. This is because the GRP has primary jurisdiction over general law and order matters within railway premises.

=== State Police ===
State governments in India have primary jurisdiction over law enforcement, including maintaining law and order, investigating crimes, prosecuting offenders, and managing prisons. Each state in India has its own state police force. At the most basic level, law enforcement is carried out by police stations. These stations are responsible for maintaining law and order, preventing and detecting crimes, and patrolling their designated areas.

The officer in charge of a police station, known as the Station House Officer (SHO), possesses significant powers for maintaining law and order and preventing and detecting crime within the station's jurisdictional area. State police departments often have specialized units like the Crime Branch/CID, ATS, Economic Offenses Wing and Cyber Crime Divisions to investigate complex cases that local police may not be equipped to handle. These units are typically activated when investigations require specialized expertise, when local police investigations are insufficient, or when ordered by the government or higher courts.

==== Anti Corruption Bureaus (ACB) ====
Each state/union territory government possess an agency to investigate and prevent corruption within the public offices. These Anti-Corruption Bureaus are responsible for the enforcement of Prevention of Corruption Act, 1988 and related laws. ACBs have the power to investigate allegations of corruption, conduct raids, arrest suspects, and prosecute offenders. Some states lack dedicated ACBs. In such cases, the Lokayukta's investigation wing handles corruption probes.

The Supreme Court and also the Kerala High Court have clarified that State Vigilance and Anti-Corruption Bureaus (ACBs) have the authority to investigate corruption offenses committed by central government employees. This ruling implies that in cases involving union government officials, the ACB can initiate its own investigation, a power previously exclusive to the CBI.

==== Special jurisdiction agencies ====
State Excise and Prohibition Departments are responsible for enforcing laws related to narcotics, alcohol, and controlled substances. They enforce the Narcotic Drugs and Psychotropic Substances Act, 1985 (NDPS). State Forest and Wildlife Departments are tasked with enforcing laws related to forest and wildlife crime management. State Transport Departments/Motor Vehicles Departments are responsible for enforcing the Motor Vehicles Act and its associated rules.

=== Union territories ===
Law enforcement in the union territories of India is primarily handled by the respective Union Territory (UT) Police Forces. These forces are responsible for maintaining law and order, investigating crimes, and ensuring public safety within their jurisdictions. The Ministry of Home Affairs (MHA) oversees the UT Police Forces, providing administrative and policy guidance. The Administrator or Lieutenant Governor of each UT exercises executive authority over the police force in their respective territory.

== Statistics on Police ==
=== Police strength and organization ===
According to the Bureau of Police Research and Development (BPRD) (Data as of 01–01–2024), the sanctioned strength of the state police forces in India was 27.55 lakhs, comprising 19.31 lakh Civil Police, 2.71 lakh District Armed Reserve, 3.88 lakh Special Armed Police, and 1.65 lakh personnel in Indian Reserve Battalions (IRBs). The sanctioned police–population ratio was 197.44 per lakh population, while the civil police strength alone was 138.40 per lakhs. The density of police personnel was 83.81 per 100 square kilometers (total police).

The actual strength of state police forces was 21.62 lakhs, of which 15.25 lakhs were Civil Police, 1.96 lakh District Armed Police, 3.14 lakh Special Armed Police, and 1.28 lakhs in IRBs. The highest actual strength was in Uttar Pradesh (3.18 lakhs), followed by Maharashtra (2.07 lakhs). As of 2024, there were 848 police districts, 18,284 police stations, 343 State Armed Police battalions, and 77 police commissionerates. Tamil Nadu had the highest number of sanctioned police stations (2,349), while Ladakh had the lowest (11). Maharashtra had the highest number of commissionerates (12). The strength of women police was 2.73 lakhs (9.7% of the total), an increase from 2.64 lakhs in 2023. Uttar Pradesh had the largest number of women personnel (39,373).

== Selection and training ==
- Sardar Vallabhbhai Patel National Police Academy (SVPNPA), Hyderabad: trains IPS officers.
- Northeast Police Academy (NEPA),
- State police academies: train state cadre officers and constables.
- Specialized academies exist for CAPFs and other agencies both at State and Federal level.

The recruitment process differs by position, and direct entry (where an applicant does not have to start at the lowest level) is possible. Educational requirements increase for higher posts. Assistant superintendents of police (ASP) are recruited annually by the independent Union Public Service Commission by competitive examination, and are appointed to the Indian Police Service. The IPS officers are then assigned to a state/union territory police force. Trainee officers undergo 44 weeks of initial training, which includes invited lawyers and management consultants. At the end of their probation, they have several weeks of orientation at the state police academy.

Non-managerial positions are selected by the state (or central) government, and are trained at police recruit schools. The length of training for inspectors is about a year; for constables, it is nearly nine months. School training staff is drawn from the police force. Police are trained in basic law, self-protection, weapons handling and other skills at recruit stations. Superior recruits receive special training. Recruitment for state police is conducted by state police recruitment boards or state public service commission. Eligibility standards are set by the central government, depending on state demographics.

== Transportation ==
Indian police widely use SUVs rather than sedans for routine duties, due to the country's diverse terrain. The Mahindra Commander Jeep was the most used car by the police in India until some time ago. This jeep was practical for patrolling rural areas and had a large seating capacity. Now with the arrival of new generation SUVs they are phased out. SUVs are known for their ability to handle a variety of terrain. Instead of the old Mahindra Jeep, the police are relying on the Mahindra Bolero. Most state police departments in India now use sport utility vehicles like the Mahindra Bolero, Tata Sumo, Maruti Gypsy, Tata Safari, Mahindra Scorpio, and Mahindra Thar. In cities, compact utility vehicles (compact SUVs) such as the Mahindra TUV300 and Ford EcoSport, multi-purpose vehicles (MPVs) such as the Toyota Innova and Maruti Suzuki Ertiga, and sedans such as the Toyota Etios and Maruti Suzuki Swift Dzire are used. In some states, like Kerala, vehicles such as the Force Gurkha, the Isuzu DMax, the Mitsubishi Pajero, are used for special purposes.

Minivans are used by police in cities such as Delhi, Mumbai, Bangalore and Lucknow where the Chevrolet Tavera (Delhi, Kochi, Kozhikode and Thiruvananthapuram), Toyota Qualis (Mumbai, Delhi and Chennai) and Maruti Suzuki Ertiga (Bangalore, Lucknow and Pune) are extensively used. Although most cities use SUVs and minivans, Chennai has adopted sedans such as the Hyundai Accent; Kolkata has adopted the Tata Indigo. In Kerala cities such as Thiruvananthapuram, Kochi and Kozhikode, the Pink Police Patrol (to protect women) uses the Toyota Etios, Maruti Suzuki Swift DZire, Volkswagen Vento and Police Control Room Units uses Mahindra TUV and new gen Mahindra Thar as first responding vehicle. Mumbai Police and Lucknow Police use Mahindra TUV for Pink Police.

Depending upon the state, police vehicles may have revolving lights, strobes, or light bars and public announcement systems, surveillance cameras. A modernization drive has ensured that vehicles are equipped with two-way radios in communication with a central control room. Highway police vehicles generally have radar equipment, breath analyzers, and emergency first aid kits. For traffic regulation and city patrol, motorcycles are also used; most was the Indian version of the Royal Enfield Bullet, but the Bajaj Pulsar and TVS Apache are also used.

=== Motorcycles ===
Vehicle	Origin	Primary Use	Image
Royal Enfield 350/500	India	Used for patrolling, interceptor duties, acrobatic display teams, and VIP convoy escort.	
Harley-Davidson Street 750	USA	Exclusively used by Gujarat Police and Kolkata Police for piloting VIP convoys.	
Bajaj Pulsar 150	India	Used mainly by traffic police and for beat policing duties.	
TVS Apache	India	Used by traffic police as interceptor motorcycles and for city patrol.	
Hero Honda Splendor	India	Used primarily by police forces in rural regions.	
Hero XPulse 200		Used by Kerala Police for beat patrolling.	

=== SUVs & Utility Vehicles of Indian Police ===
Vehicle	Origin	Primary Use	Image
Mahindra Bolero	India	Widely used patrol and utility vehicle, especially in rural and semi-urban areas; transport of personnel and armed police duties.	
Mahindra Scorpio	India	Patrol, escort, special forces use, senior officials.	
Tata Safari Storme	India	Tactical police units (SWAT), VIP security, Dial-100 response units.	
Tata Sumo	India	Former mainstay patrol SUV; deployed extensively in rural and rough terrain areas.	
Maruti Gypsy	India / Japan	Squad car and rapid response unit; used by state police and central armed police forces.	
Mahindra Thar	India	Rural and rough-terrain patrol; first responder vehicle in some states.	
Mahindra TUV300	India	Urban patrol vehicle; used by Tamil Nadu, Kerala, Mumbai and Lucknow Police.	
Ford Endeavor	India / USA	Heavy-duty patrol and escort duties; used by select police forces and paramilitary units.	
Mitsubishi Pajero	Japan / India	VIP security and special deployment duties.	
Toyota Fortuner	Japan / India	Senior officers, NIA/CBI/IB usage, border deployments (ITBP).	
Isuzu D-Max	Japan / India	Used by special forces (Nagaland, Karnataka Police) for special operations.	
Force Gurkha	India	Patrolling in rough terrain, hill stations, naxal-affected and forest regions (notably Kerala).	
Mahindra XUV500	India	Investigation cells, special forces, VIP escorts, senior officials.	
Mahindra Thar (Old Generation)	India	Used mostly in rural areas.	

=== MPVs & Sedans (Urban & Administrative Use) ===
Vehicle	Origin	Primary Use	Image
Toyota Innova	Japan / India	Official vehicle for senior police officers; also used for highway patrol, PCR, and urban patrol duties.	
Maruti Suzuki Ertiga	India	Mobile beat patrol units (e.g., Hoysala, Pink Patrol); also used by senior officers.	
Chevrolet Tavera	India / USA	Used for patrol duties, highway patrol, customs raids, and transport of officers (now discontinued in India).	
Honda Civic	Japan / India	Staff vehicle for police officials.	
Toyota Corolla	Japan / India	Staff vehicle for administrative and official duties.	
Hyundai Accent	Korea / India	Squad car; used notably by Tamil Nadu and Andhra Pradesh Police.	
Tata Indigo CS	India	Squad car; used by commissioners of Income Tax, Police, Customs, and Central Excise.	
Hindustan Ambassador (Phased out)	India	Former official vehicle of senior law enforcement officers.	

=== Armored & Tactical Vehicles ===
Vehicle	Origin	Primary Use	Image
Mahindra Rakshak	India	Armoured personnel carrier; riot control vehicle used by state police and special units.	
Ashok Leyland MBPV	India	Mine-Protected Bulletproof Vehicle used by Punjab Police SWAT and Kerala Police Thunderbolts.	
Mahindra Marksman	India	Light bulletproof vehicle used by riot control and special forces units (Delhi, Mumbai, Karnataka Police).	
Tata LATC	India	Light Armoured Troop Carrier used by riot control and special forces units.	
Tata 407 (Armoured Variant)	India	Riot control vehicle, armoured personnel carrier, prison van, and police personnel carrier.	
Tata Vajra	India	Armoured riot control and troop transport vehicle.	
Renault Sherpa	France	Tactical vehicle used by CISF and NSG for special operations.	

== Equipment and Weapons ==
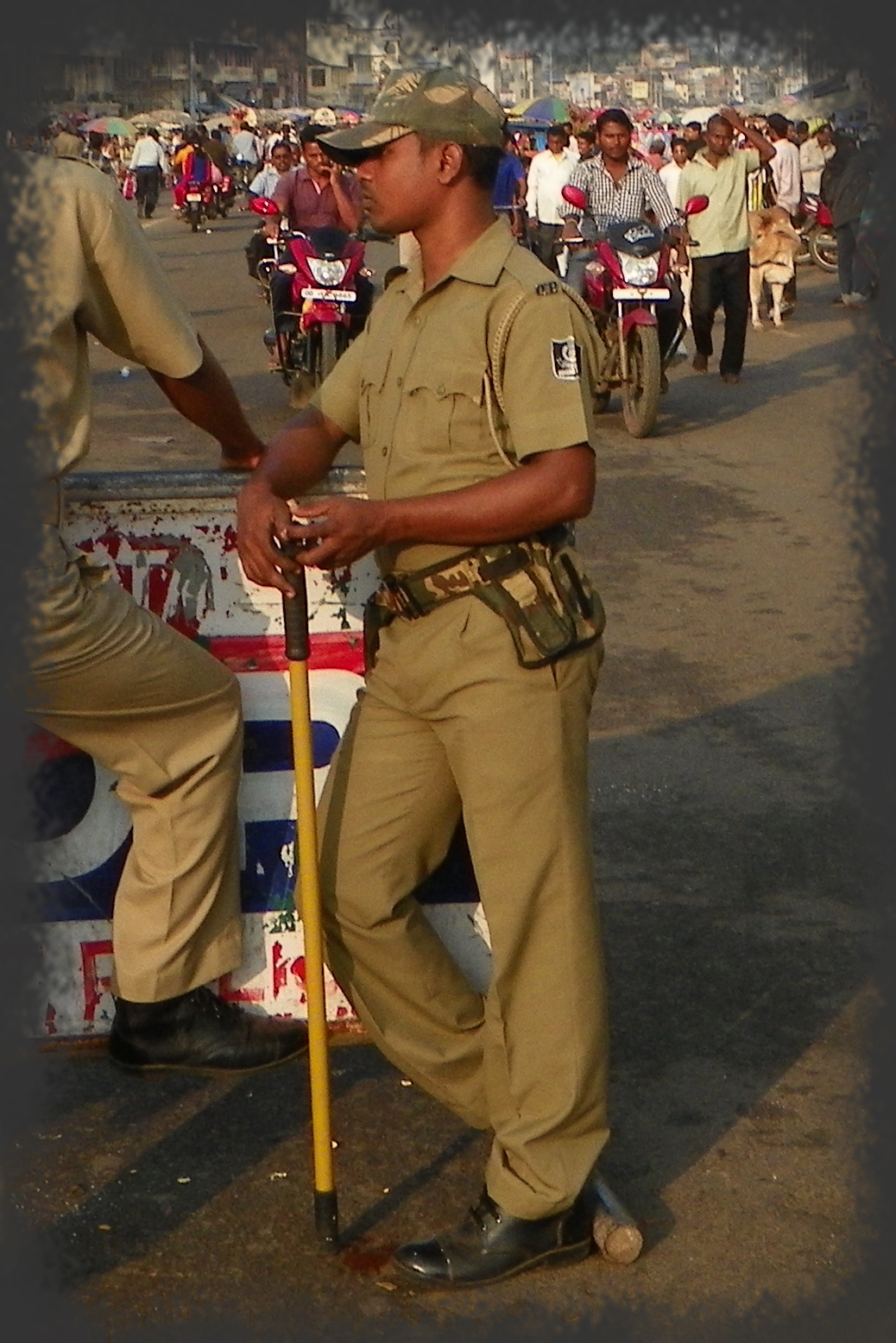
lathi equipped police constable at Jagannath Temple, Puri, Odisha.

Weapons and equipment vary from state to state and agency to agency. Standard equipment for a constable who walk on the beat is the lathi, (a long baton—generally made of bamboo, but presently also made of polymer). Riot police have other equipment, including tear gas and tasers.

Although police constables do not generally carry firearms on regular duty, they are available at police stations. Officers at and above the rank of sub-inspector or head constable are authorized to carry a side arm, generally a Pistol Auto 9mm 1A or a Glock 17. Officers always carry side arms. Traffic police officers have fine books and other equipment.

Firearms previously stocked at police stations included .303 Lee–Enfield rifles (now replaced), 7.62 1A self-loading rifles and SAF Carbine 2A1s, which have been replaced by AK-47 and INSAS rifles. The Ordnance Factory Board is a supplier of arms, ammunition, uniforms, bullet-proof vehicles, and mine-protected vehicles to the police. Only a station officer can allow the use of reserve guns in emergencies. During public unrest, protests or possible terrorist attacks, police are equipped by the state (or central) government.

Special units at the state and federal level have automatic weapons, such as the AK-47, AKM and INSAS assault rifles and Bren guns. Special-forces and SWAT units use Heckler & Koch MP5s, Brügger & Thomet MP9s, AK-103s, M4A1 Carbines and others. Bulletproof jackets are generally not worn by state police, although special units carry tactical vests, gear, and weapons according to function.

Name	Weapon	Type	Caliber	Origin	Note
Handguns
Beretta 92		Semi-automatic pistol	9×19mm Parabellum	Italy	Standard issue firearm
Pistol Auto 9mm 1A		Semi-automatic pistol	9×19mm Parabellum	India	Standard issue firearm
Glock 17		Semi-automatic pistol	9×19mm Parabellum	Austria	Standard Issue Firearm
IOF .32 revolver		Revolver	7.65mm x 23mm	India	Standard issue firearm
CornerShot		weapon accessory		Israel and India	Used by SWAT Team.
Shotgun
OFB pump action Shotgun		Pump action	12-gauge shotgun	India	Used mostly by prison service and Forest Departments
Sub-Machine Gun
SAF Carbine 2A1		Submachine gun	9×19mm Parabellum	India	Phasing out and being replaced by MSMC
Heckler & Koch MP5		Submachine gun	9×19mm Parabellum	Germany	Used mainly by Police SWAT and CAPFs
Brügger & Thomet MP9		Submachine gun	9×19mm Parabellum	Switzerland	Used mainly by Police SWAT
Sten Sub Machine		Submachine gun	9×19mm Parabellum	UK	Being phased out and replaced by MSMC
Modern Sub Machine Carbine		Submachine gun	9×19mm Parabellum	India	Replacing all Sten Sub Machine and SAF Carbine 2A1
Assault Rifle/ Battle Rifles
Ishapore 2A1 rifle		bolt-action	7.62 NATO	India	Being phased out, mainly retain for ceremonial purpose, still employed by Forest Departments
315" Sporting Rifle		bolt-action	8 mm (.315")	India	Mainly employed by Forest Departments
12 Bore Double barrel shotgun		Double barrel shotgun	12-gauge	India	Mainly employed by Forest Departments
SG 552		Assault rifle	5.56×45mm NATO	Switzerland	Being used by Mumbai police's Force One Commando and Punjab Police SWAT Team
L1A1 Self-Loading Rifle		Semi-automatic rifle	7.62×51mm NATO	UK	Phased out(Police) Being used by Home guard and VDG's
AKM		Assault Rifle	7.62×39mm	Russia	
1B1 INSAS		Assault Rifle	5.56×45mm NATO	India	Mainstay of police force
Amogh carbine		Carbine	5.56×45mm NATO	India	Used by Manipur police and Uttar Pradesh police.
Excalibur rifle		Assault Rifle	5.56×45mm NATO	India	Used by Manipur police, Karnataka police, Assam police and West Bengal police.
AK-103		Assault rifle	7.62×39mm	Russia	Used by Mizoram Police and Mumbai Police.
Colt M4		Assault rifle	5.56 NATO	USA	Used by Mizoram Police and Mumbai Police.
Light Machine Gun
GUN MACHINE 7.62MM IA		Light machine Gun	7.62 x 51 mm NATO	India	Being phased out
INSAS LMG		Light machine Gun	5.56×45mm NATO	India	Being replaced
Sniper Rifles
M107		Sniper Rifle	416 Barrett	USA	Used by Mumbai Police's Force One Commandos
PSG1		Sniper Rifle	7.62×51mm NATO	Germany	Used by OCTOPUS and Greyhounds

=== Uniforms ===
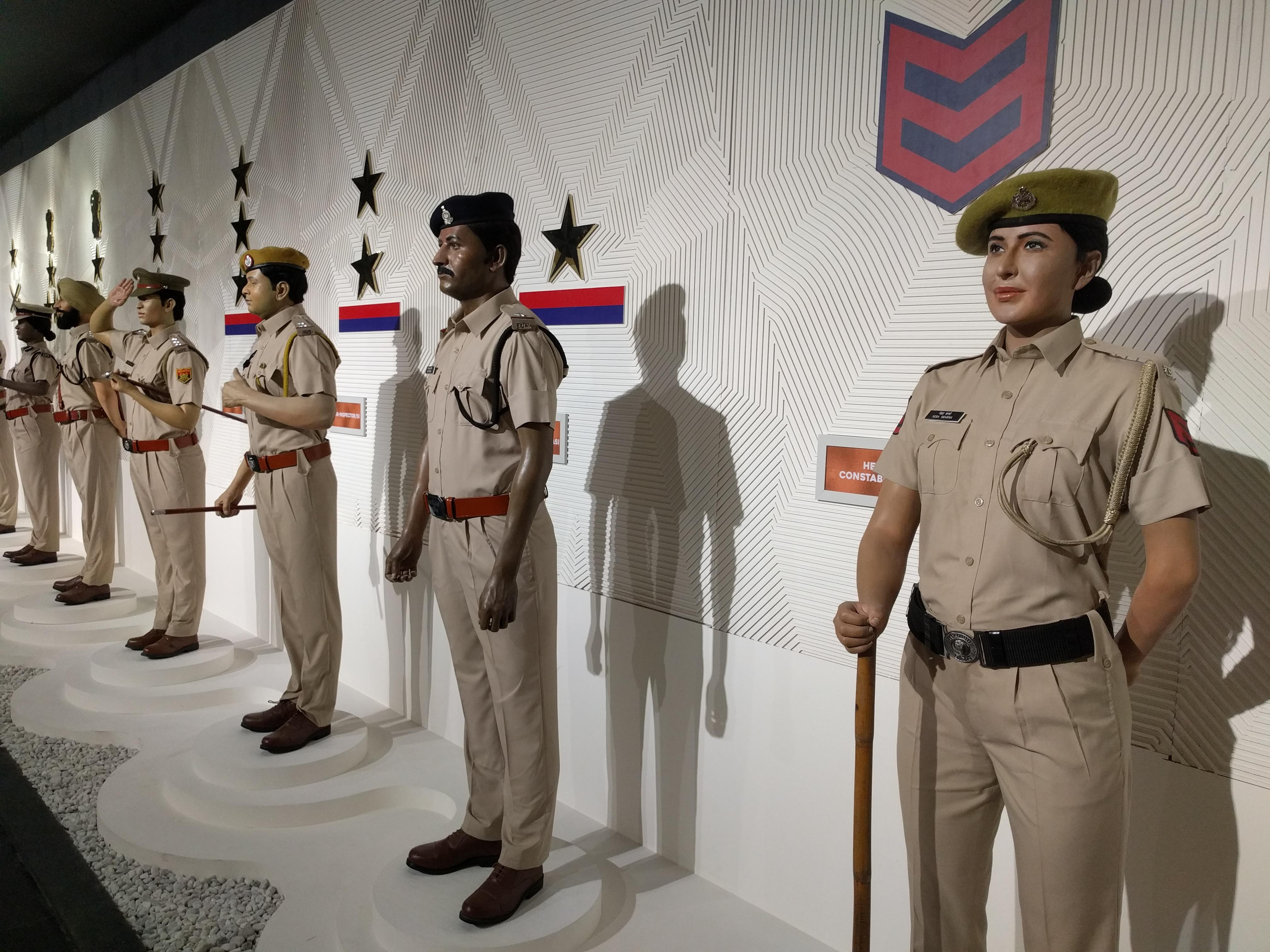
Exhibit of Indian police ranks and uniforms at the National Police Memorial and Museum, New Delhi

Uniforms of state and local police vary by grade, region, and type of duty. The main service uniform for state police is khaki. Some cities, such as Kolkata, have white uniforms. Headgear differs by rank and state; officers usually wear a peaked cap, and constables wear berets or side caps. Branches such as the Crime Branch, Special Branch do not have a uniform; business dress is worn with a badge. Special-service armed police have tactical uniforms in accordance with their function, and traffic police generally wear a white uniform.

== Special units ==
- CoBRA - The Commando Battalion for Resolute Action, abbreviated as CoBRA, is a specialized force under the Central Reserve Police Force (CRPF). It is tasked with combating left-wing extremism and insurgents, primarily engaged in jungle warfare operations.
- Anti-Terrorism Squad (ATS) - Anti-Terrorism Squads (ATS) are specialized units of state police forces tasked with combating terrorism, handling counter-terror operations, and investigating terrorism-related crimes. Maharashtra State Police was the first police department in the country to set up an ATS unit. Each ATS unit collaborates with central agencies like the National Investigation Agency (NIA) and the Intelligence Bureau (IB) to handle threats and ensure national security.

== Initiatives ==
Informers (mukhbir) provide information for financial compensation. Police agencies budget for their mukhbirs because they are "the eyes and ears of police", and help resolve cases. In 2012, the Delhi Police budgeted ₹ 40 lakh (₹ 4 million) to pay their mukhbir (₹ 2,000 per inspector).

== Accountability and oversight ==
Police accountability in India is ensured through courts, human rights commissions, police complaint authorities, legislative oversight, and internal mechanisms—but implementation gaps, political interference, and weak independent oversight remain major hurdles.

=== Institutional mechanism ===
- Police Complaint Authorities: To address public complaints against serious misconduct (though implementation is weak in many states). Many states has constituted PCAs but their power is only limited to investigate and report to government; has no independent power to take any action.
  - The State Police Complaints Authority, chaired by a retired High Court judge, inquires into complaints against officers of the rank of Superintendent of Police and above, while District Police Complaints Authorities, chaired by retired District Judges, handle complaints against officers below the rank of Deputy Superintendent of Police.
- Human Rights Commissions: National Human Rights Commission (NHRC) and State Human Rights Commissions monitor violations like custodial deaths or torture.
- Lokayuktas / Vigilance Commissions: Investigate corruption in police.
- Internal Accountability: Departmental inquiries, suspension, dismissal, or criminal prosecution of errant officers.

=== Judicial oversight ===
Courts can order inquiries into custodial deaths, fake encounters, or abuse of power. Courts can order inquiries into custodial deaths, fake encounters, or abuse of power. The Supreme Court's directives in Prakash Singh v. Union of India constitute a landmark judgment by the apex court on police oversight.

=== Executive and legislative oversight ===
Executive and legislative control: Exercised through State Home Departments, the Ministry of Home Affairs, and questions raised in State Legislative Assemblies and Parliament.

== Limitations, drawbacks and other issues ==
=== Over-centralization of leadership ===
The over-centralization of leadership through the Indian Police Service (IPS) poses a significant structural challenge within India's policing system. Unlike many Western countries where police forces have more linear, rank-based career progression, India follows a three-tier entry system: at the constable level (constabulary), the sub-inspector level, and the Deputy Superintendent of Police (DySP) level through State Public Service Commissions. While state officers can reach middle management levels, their promotion to top leadership positions is rare due to the dominance of Indian Police Service (IPS) officers at the top. This creates a dual structure that often leads to morale issues, lack of motivation among state cadre officers, and disconnect between leadership and the working ranks.

The police hierarchy in India is broadly divided into four levels: senior leadership (IPS officers), middle-level leadership (State Police Service officers such as Additional Superintendents of Police and Deputy Superintendents of Police), officer level (Inspectors, Sub-Inspectors, and Assistant Sub-Inspectors), and the constabulary (Head Constables and Constables). While day-to-day field operations are primarily managed by the lower two tiers, top leadership roles are predominantly held by IPS officers—career civil servants selected through the national-level UPSC examination.

A key concern in India's policing structure is the limited grassroots experience of Indian Police Service (IPS) officers. Their initial field postings, such as Assistant Superintendents of Police in-charge of police subdivisions and police stations, are generally short-term, lasting only a few months to a few years. This restricts their engagement with local law enforcement challenges and operational realities.

State Police Service officers, such as Addl.SPs and DSPs, have limited access to senior leadership positions unless conferred IPS status—a process that is rare and delayed by bureaucratic procedures. Meanwhile, operational policing at the grassroots level is carried out by Inspectors, Sub-Inspectors, and constables. Constabulary personnel typically have minimal upward mobility, with most retiring below or at the rank of Sub-Inspector. Many lower-ranked constable-level police personnel possess substantial educational qualifications and field expertise; however, their opportunities for promotion remain limited.

=== Shortage of officers ===
India's police-to-population ratio is approximately 152 personnel per 100,000 people, which is significantly below the United Nations recommended standard of 222 per 100,000 (UNODC, 2010). According to data from the Bureau of Police Research and Development (BPRD, 2023), this figure reflects not only a quantitative shortfall but is also exacerbated by high vacancy rates in sanctioned posts—often exceeding 20% in several states. These shortages contribute to an overburdened police force, affecting response time, investigation quality, and overall public service delivery. As a core issue in policing, the shortage of personnel was previously noted in the aftermath of the 2008 terrorist attacks in Jaipur, Bangalore, and Ahmedabad.

Although several metropolitan cities like Delhi and Mumbai have a strength of 400 and 260 per 100,000 people respectively, which is significantly higher than the national average and surpassing the UN recommended standards, many of the personnel are assigned to VIP security, traffic management, and other administrative duties, causing work overload on personnel for other duties such as law and order, patrolling, and crime investigations. Furthermore, a significant number of vacant posts have been reported, and experts have noted the vacancies occur due to factors such as retirements, promotions and resignations, and that filling these posts was a continuous process.

=== Lack of community oriented policing ===
A key drawback of policing in India is the overemphasis on maintaining law and order through authoritative methods, which has been a backdrop of colonial era policing, rather than adopting a community policing approach. The traditional model remains largely colonial in nature, prioritizing control, surveillance, and reactive measures over proactive, citizen-centric engagement. This approach often leads to a disconnect between the police and the public, where the force is viewed more as an instrument of authority than as a service-oriented institution.

=== Corruption ===
As a key issue, which has persisted for long, corruption in law enforcement across India has been a major reason that has been a drawback of the present system. While bribery is rampant, police corruption has also been linked to favors, false reports, threats to public for personal gains, freebies, extortion to run businesses, enforcement of arbitrary and draconian laws, fabricating evidence to protect the rich and political elite, as well as internal payoffs for preferred postings and promotions. Unlike western nations, where police are accountable to the public, the Police Act of 1861, a colonial era police law that is still in use across several states, mandates the accountability of law enforcement to the political leadership in power, which is often misused to quell protests or suppress evidences if linked to political figures. The law also compels personnel, mostly subordinates, to work for long hours at a stretch with no sufficient rest, which affects investigations, conduct towards public, and there have been instances where such officials have engaged in victim blaming, especially in crimes against women. In addition, many instances of police officers refusing to file reports and investigate have taken place, or delayed actions, which have led to citizens taking law into their hands and lynching culprits to death, mostly in sensitive cases like crimes against women.

One reason for police corruption is the poor pay and benefits, along with no overtime and hazard pay for dangerous police work or operations. The 7th Pay Commission mandated a pay of Rs. 21,700 per month for constables, while the top ranked Director-General of Police having a pay of Rs. 225,000 per month. The pay for constables and inspector-ranked officers varies from state to state. Across metro areas, the lowest of the subordinates i.e. the constabulary does not get decent housing or any allowances for reasonable accommodation. In addition, while service rules mandate promotion based on merit and time in service, it is not duly followed, due to which officials have resorted to pay bribes for promotions and choice of postings.

Following the 2006 Supreme Court orders, all states were directed to implement police reforms to combat corruption, improve working conditions, ensure modernization, and form Police Complaints Authority to investigate misconduct by law enforcement personnel. However, most states have had zero or partial compliance to the orders, as many of the Governments feared a loss of political control over their police forces. Furthermore, the Police Complaints Authority have been criticized for being lame-duck institutions that lack real power to take down errant police personnel accused of misconduct, as well as delaying justice by covering up their actions.

== Public perception ==
In the past, police in India lacked public trust and sometimes were not viewed as legitimate authorities. People generally did not prefer to go the police for help, if given the choice, and often specifically tried to avoid them. Oftentimes, when people did go to the police, it is "only for instrumental purposes, such as obtaining a First Information Report (FIR) as documentary evidence. People expected the police be unhelpful at best, and corrupt or brutal "little tyrants" at worst as one past 2010 report claimed. Former Union Home Minister P. Chidambaram characterized the police constable as "the most reviled public servant in India." Even police officers in the past themselves often lacked faith in the institution, as illustrated by an apocryphal story popular among officers where "a self-styled 'honest cop'" asks a group of fellow officers if they would trust their coworkers to take care of a family member in trouble — to which none of them said yes.Since those years much has changed and the trajectory has been positive with the changes in budgets (higher), policing standards, stricter oversight(through body cams) and much more, the police no longer are the untrusted version of what they once were, and such changes have been welcomed in society by an large and continue to progress rapidly all through updated uniforms to different policing tactics.

Scholars usually tend to attribute the police's past poor reputation in India to two main factors. First, the police as an institution in India was first developed by the British as an instrument of control. The Police Act, 1861, which remains "the institutional bedrock across the country", configured the police to focus less on public service and crime investigation, and more on "coercive order keeping and crowd pacification". Second, the police in postcolonial India were affected by the same corruption and abuse of power that has plagued the past governments in general. Police have historically been known to apply excessive force, extortion, and arbitrary and often sometimes discriminatory use of authority.

Due to the previous colonial Police Act of 1861 being used, the colonial era mindset and training had effectively caused negative impact on police recruits after being assigned postings. This had led to instances of refusal to file reports in certain cases, especially against political elites or politically connected criminals, harassment of civilians for personal, political or financial gains, or victim blaming, which often happens with rape survivors or women who face sexual harassment. In such instances, errant officials either face suspensions or transfer instead of dismissal from service as well as punishment from the judicial system, which translates the lack of accountability towards the general public, as the Police Act mostly holds officials accountable to the political elite, whether in power or opposition. As policing is a state responsibility based on the Constitution of India, most states across have adopted the 1861 Act without change, while others have passed laws heavily based on the 1861 Act. Since majority provisions of the 1861 Act are not relevant in current times with the advancement in technology, several police commissions, led by retired police officials like Julio Francis Ribeiro and Prakash Singh have recommended and demanded that the 1861 law be replaced with a Modern Police Act. However, despite demands from the citizens and the retired officers, political leaders in power have refused to replace and overhaul the colonial era Police Act, as it often allows leadership to influence investigations, especially on cases against them, along with targeting opposing leaders and citizens who criticize or protest against them. In certain instances, absurd rules made by Police departments have been heavily censured, especially when they are implemented without proper research and non-consultation with the general public, and despite court warnings and orders to drop these rules, many of these arbitrary rules continue to be enforced - the Kolkata bicycle ban enforced by traffic cops is a classic example, where the ban on certain roads and through fares was enforced to improve traffic flow without conducting proper research, and only after a PIL was filed in the High Court, the department was ordered and forced to reduce the restrictions from 174 to 62 through fares.

The mindset from the colonial Police Act of 1861 has also caused an increase in instances of moral policing by law enforcement officials. Across such occasions, several police personnel have been slammed for moral policing for cases of public display of affection by couples, or women's clothing or lifestyle choices. As a result of increase in incidents of moral policing by police personnel, the Supreme Court of India passed a ruling in December 2022 stating that police officers cannot indulge in any kind of moral policing. Senior most Police officers have also passed orders to subordinate and junior personnel to not engage in moral policing in the aftermath of such incidents. Furthermore, after certain incidents have been filed in courts, the departments have been ordered to pay compensations to those targeted by moral policing.

Several police officials, mostly inspector and constable ranked personnel, have often contemplated about quitting due to over-working and being underpaid when compared to the corporate or private sector jobs, as subordinate personnel have been forced to work 24 hours or more without break and no over-time pay, as the Police Act of 1861 has a statutory requirement of being on call for 24 hours or more. With poor pay, along with pathetic living conditions or accommodations provided, several junior ranked personnel have been forced to demand bribes or engage in extortion, while the overtime working of subordinates affects morale and hampers investigations, besides displaying a bad attitude towards public, which degrades public trust towards police. As means to solve several crimes quickly due to this, many officers have admitted to use of torture and violence against potential culprits to force confessions, and the lack of conviction of errant officers degrades trust towards police personnel. As a result of this, the Supreme Court enforced a mandate that confessions in custody will not be used as evidence. Several public opinions have stated that filling vacancies and overcoming shortage of personnel by high recruitment can solve this problem partially, while also help tackle unemployment.

In addition to overworking, a disunity in the force exists due to 4 levels of entry - constables, sub-inspectors, state service DSPs, and IPS, with constables being treated as slaves or personal servants for senior officers. This type of police system has been severely criticized by several current and retired senior police officials, demanding a single entry into the force from constable that is standard across several western nations, which has met resistance from other officials and political establishment. Apart from the disunity and shortage of personnel, a lot of operational issues plague with the police departments, such as lack of quality patrolling vehicles, outdated technology, and using antiquated and obsolete weaponry. These issues were highlighted in the second episode of second season of Satyamev Jayate, hosted by actor Aamir Khan, who discussed about them with several serving and retired police officers, with one of guests stating that the starting rank for anyone joining the force should start with constable, rather than having different levels of entry. As per the Human Rights Watch report of 2009, constables constitute nearly 85% of the total force, inspector rank officers constitute 14%, while senior ranks, which range from SP to DGP, are at 1%.

Although improvements have taken place after media exposures and judicial rulings for police reforms and better working conditions, many states have refused to comply due to political reasons, and do not provide sufficient budget for development of police forces or a contingency fund, as well as critical resources. Additionally, the constabulary have been treated as slaves and forced to do menial tasks instead of actual police work, which questions the intents and motives of senior officials, with many unwilling to listen or bring changes. Following increase in complaints and media exposes, home ministers across various states ordered police departments to have constables only perform official police duties rather than have them work as personal servants.

While the Police Service norms mandate both merit-based and time-in-service promotion for all ranks, including constable and inspector rank officers, it is not duly followed or implemented. This has caused constables to remain at the same rank, or maximum of one to 2 promotions of head constable or ASI (Assistant Sub-Inspector) till retirement. Despite the norms, as well as the Supreme Court orders on police reforms, bureaucratic inefficiencies, nepotism and the policies laid in the Police Act of 1861 prevent low-ranking officers from getting promotions, even if they get a pay raise to the next rank. As a result of not being promoted despite good standing, several personnel have filed lawsuits against departments and complained about mental agony because of denied promotions. Despite the negative reception of police personnel among the general public, several officers have been received praise for several community based policing initiatives, as well as off-duty community services. Certain police officers have also received praise during critical situations like terrorist attacks, including tributes paid to officers killed in action.

== Law enforcement reforms in India ==
The Police in India, primarily governed by the colonial-era Police Act, 1861, has long been criticized for its subservience to the executive and lack of accountability. While some states have enacted their own police acts post-independence, such as the Bombay Police Act of 1951, the Kerala Police Act of 1963, and the Delhi Police Act of 1978, the core issues of police accountability and public trust remain largely unaddressed, as the state police laws passed were based largely on the 1861 Act. The landmark judgment in Prakash Singh v. Union of India marked a significant step towards police reforms in India. The Supreme Court issued several directives to the Central and State Governments to improve the efficiency and accountability of the police force. Following are the key directives of the SC;

- State Security Commission (SSC)

Establishment of a State Security Commission to ensure the independence of the police and prevent undue political interference. The Commission should be modeled after recommendations from the National Human Rights Commission, Reberio Committee, or Sorabjee Committee.

- Selection and Tenure of DGP:
  - Selection of the Director General of Police (DGP)/Head of Police Force from among the three most senior officers empaneled by the Union Public Service Commission.
  - A minimum tenure of two years for the DGP, irrespective of their date of superannuation.
- Tenure of Operational Police Officers:
  - A minimum tenure of two years for police officers on operational duties, such as Inspectors General (IGPs) in-charge of police zones, Deputy Inspectors General (DIGs) in-charge of police ranges, Superintendents of Police (SPs) in-charge of police districts, and Station House Officers (SHOs) in charge of police stations.
- Separation of Investigation and Law and Order:
  - Separation of investigative and law and order functions of police at the police station level.
- Police Establishment Board:
  - Establishment of a Police Establishment Board at the State level to handle transfers, postings, promotions, and other service-related matters of officers up to the rank of Deputy Superintendent of Police.
- Police Complaint Authority
  - Establishment of Police Complaints Authorities at the State and District levels to investigate complaints against police officers.
- National Security Commission:
  - Establishment of a National Security Commission at the Union level to select and place chiefs of Central Police Organizations (CPOs) and ensure their minimum tenure of two years.

As of March 2026, India's police continue to be governed by a colonial police law passed in 1861. The Indian Constitution makes policing a state subject and therefore the state governments have the responsibility to provide their communities with a police service. However, after independence, most have adopted the 1861 Act without change, while others have passed laws heavily based on the 1861 Act. Repeated major incidents, like the 2012 Delhi gang rape and murder, 2020 Hathras gang rape and murder, as well as terrorist attacks such as the 2008 Mumbai attacks revealed the failure of the police to uphold the rule of law.

The need for police reform in India has long been recognized. There have been almost 30 years of debate and discussion by government-created committees and commissions on the way forward for police reform, but India remains saddled with an outdated and old-fashioned law, while report after report gathers dust on government bookshelves without implementation. Many committees on police reform have recommended major reforms in the police system coupled with systematic accountability.

=== National Police Commission (1977–81) ===
The National Police Commission was the first committee set up by the Government of India to report on policing. The National Police Commission began sitting in 1979, in the context of a post-Emergency India, and produced eight reports, including a Model Police Act, between 1979 and 1981.

=== Ribeiro Committee (1998–99) ===
In 1996, two former senior police officers filed a Public interest litigation (PIL) in the Supreme Court, asking for the Court to direct governments to implement the recommendations of the National Police Commission. The Supreme Court directed the government to set up a committee to review the commission's recommendations, and thus the Ribeiro Committee was formed. The committee, under the leadership of Julio Ribeiro, a former chief of police, sat from 1998 and 1999, and produced two reports.

=== Padmanabhaiah Committee (2000) ===
In 2000, the government set up a third committee on police reform, this time under the stewardship of a former Union Home Secretary, K. Padmanabhaiah. This Committee released its report in the same year.

=== Malimath Committee Report (2003) ===
The Malimath Committee Report, submitted in March 2003, has very articulately laid down the foundation of a restructured and reoriented police system. The committee, in its report, observed that the success of the whole process of Criminal Justice Administration depended completely on the proper functioning of the police organisation, especially in the investigation stage. Apart from the investigation of offences, the police also have the duty of maintaining law and order.

=== Soli Sorabjee Committee (2005) ===
In 2005, the government put together a group to draft a new police act for India. It was headed by Soli Sorabjee (former attorney general). The committee submitted a Model Police Act to the Union government in late 2006.

=== Supreme Court intervention (2006) ===
In 1996, Prakash Singh (a former chief of Assam Police and Uttar Pradesh Police and subsequently Director General of the Border Security Force) initiated a Public Interest Litigation (PIL) in the Supreme Court of India, asking the court to investigate measures to reform the police forces across India to ensure the proper rule of law and improve security across India. The Supreme Court studied various reports on police reforms. Finally, in 2006, a bench of Justice Yogesh Kumar Sabharwal, Justice C. K. Thakker and Justice P.K. Balasubramanyan ordered the state governments to implement several reforms in the police force.

Several measures were identified as necessary to professionalise the police in India:

- A mid- or high-ranking police officer must not be transferred more frequently than every two years.
- The state government cannot ask the police force to hire someone, nor can they choose the Director General of the State Police.
- There must be separate departments and staff for investigation and patrolling, which will include the creation of:
  - A State Security Commission, for policies and direction
  - A Police Establishment Board, which will decide the selection, promotions, and transfers of police officers and other staff
  - A Police Complaints Authority, to inquire into allegations of police misconduct.

==== Follow-up from Supreme Court ====
In 2006, due to a lack of action by all the state governments, the Supreme Court ordered the state governments to report to it why the reform measures outlined were not implemented. After being questioned in front of the judges of the Supreme Court, the state governments finally started to reform the police forces and give them the operational independence they need for fearless and proper law enforcement. Tamil Nadu Police has been at the forefront of the application of the new reform.

Again, in October 2012, a Supreme Court bench of Chief Justice Altamas Kabir and justices S. S. Nijjar and Jasti Chelameswar asked all state governments and Union territories to inform about compliance with its September 2006 judgement. The order was passed when Prakash Singh, through his lawyer Prashant Bhushan, said that many of the reforms (ordered by the Supreme Court) have yet to be implemented by many state governments.

=== Concerns ===
==== Low training standards and personnel shortage ====
As of March 2023, India has a police-to-population ratio of 153 personnel per 100,000 citizens, which is less than the sanctioned strength of 196 and well below the United Nations minimum requirement of 222 per 100,000 citizens. The training has also fallen short of world standards, with the shortage of personnel causing investigations to suffer. These issues were previously noted in the aftermath of the 2008 terrorist attacks in Jaipur, Bangalore, and Ahmedabad.

==== Mental health and suicide ====
IPS officers have complained of high levels of stress due to long work hours and unrealistic demands of political bosses. Retired Director General of Police in Uttar Pradesh Vikram Singh believes job discontent is a combination of "no holidays, lack of sleep, the sinking feeling of failure, public treatment of policemen with contempt, the indifference of political bosses, and almost no connection with superiors". Professional stress ruins personal lives and leads to marital discord. The inability to balance professional and personal lives has led some IPS officers to commit suicide.

==== Overworking and underpaid ====
The Indian Police Service has often faced issues of being overworked and underpaid. The 7th Pay Commission mandated a pay of Rs. 21,700 per month for constables, with the Director-General of Police having a pay of Rs. 225,000 per month. The pay for constables and inspector-ranked officers varies from state to state.

Due to a lack of a shift system, many officers, especially the constable ranks, were forced to work for more than 24 hours at a stretch, with no overtime pay. This affects the quality of the investigation as well as the morale of the officials on duty. Furthermore, the constabulary also does not get decent housing or any allowances for reasonable accommodation.

In May 2022, the Mumbai Police implemented an 8-hour shift system for the constable rank officers and assistant sub-inspectors, and 16 hours of rest. Following a lawsuit by a constable of the Delhi Police for demanding fixed working hours, proper housing, and reasonable pay in 2015, the Delhi High Court ordered senior officers of implementing better working conditions for constables in May 2023.

== See also ==
- Sheriffs of India
- Indian Armed Forces
- Judiciary of India
- Indian Penal Code
- Indian criminal law
- Government of India
- Indian Intelligence Community
- National Counter Terrorism Centre
- Police Complaints Authority (India)
- Indian Police Foundation and Institute
- List of cases of police brutality in India
- Crime and Criminal Tracking Network and Systems
- List of countries and dependencies by number of police officers
