= Specialist law enforcement agency =

Law enforcement organization

A specialist law enforcement agency (or special jurisdiction law enforcement agency) is a law enforcement agency which specializes in the types of laws it enforces, or types of activities it undertakes, or geography it enforces laws in, or these in combination.

The specialisation may be imposed voluntarily by policy, consensus with other agencies, or logistical constraints, or it could be imposed legally by law and jurisdiction, or it is result of the historical evolution of the agency, or combinations thereof.

For example, some agencies only enforce laws related to taxation or customs. Other agencies can only operate in certain areas, for example government-occupied buildings and land, or on waterways. Some agencies have otherwise unrestricted jurisdiction, but specialise in certain types of operations, for example highway patrols.

== Specialities ==
- Buildings and lands occupied or explicitly controlled by the institution and the institution's personnel, and public entering the buildings and precincts of the institution For example, United States Department of Veterans Affairs Police.
- National border patrol, security, integrity For example, United States Border Patrol.
- Water ways, bodies, coastal areas For example, National Oceanic and Atmospheric Administration Fisheries Office of Law Enforcement.
- Environment, parks, heritage property For example, United States Park Police.
- Property, personnel, items of a postal service For example, United States Postal Inspection Service.
- Buildings and other fixed assets For example, Polizei beim Deutschen Bundestag.
- Highways, roads, traffic For example, California Highway Patrol.
- Customs, excise, gambling For example, Australian Customs Service.
- Anti-corruption For example, Independent Commission Against Corruption (New South Wales).
- Taxation For example, Australian Taxation Office.
- Railways, tramways, rail transit systems For example, Canadian Pacific Railway Police Service.
- Vehicle safety and hazardous material transport laws and regulations, licensing, registration, insurance For example, Iowa Department of Transportation Motor Vehicle Enforcement Agency.
- Protection of international or domestic VIPs, protection of significant state assets For example, Special Protection Group.
- Serious or complex fraud, commercial crime, fraud covering multiple lower level jurisdictions For example, Serious Fraud Office (UK).
- Paramilitary law enforcement, counter insurgency, riot control For example, Central Reserve Police Force.
- Diplomatic personnel and facilities For example, Diplomatic Security Service.
- Coastal patrol, marine border protection, marine search and rescue For example, Indian Coast Guard.
- Enforcement of motor vehicles act, motor vehicles rules, motor vehicles taxation acts. For example, Motor Vehicles Departments (MVD) or Transport Departments of various Indian states.
- Enforcement of laws related to the sale and consumption of alcohol and drugs, enforces laws related to liquor, narcotics, psychotropics and medicines that contain alcohol and narcotics. For example, Kerala Excise, Department of Excise & Taxation, Haryana, Telangana State Excise.
- Investigation of corruption-related cases within the states. For example, Vigilance and Anti-Corruption Bureau, Anti-Corruption Bureau (Maharashtra).
- Investigation of financial crimes such as money laundering, foreign exchange violations, economic frauds, economic offences, etc. For example, at federal level: Enforcement Directorate (ED) of India, state level: Economic Offences Wing (EOW) of various indian states.
- Investigation and prosecution of terrorism related matters. National Investigation Agency

== See also ==
- Law enforcement organization
- Police tactical unit, such as SWAT
- Special police forces
