= NCTC =

NCTC can refer to:

- National Collection of Type Cultures
- National Counter Terrorism Centre, India
- National Counterterrorism Center, United States
- New Conservatory Theatre Center in San Francisco, California
- North County Transit District's COASTER, reporting mark NCTC
- North Central Texas College
- Northland Community & Technical College
