= Police Act, 1861 =

Legislation enacted in British India

Imperial Legislative Council
- Long title: An Act for the Regulation of Police.
- Citation: Act No. 5 of 1861
- Enacted by: Imperial Legislative Council
- Enacted: 16 March 1861
- Effective: 22 March 1861
- Status: In force (amended)

The Police Act, 1861 (Act V of 1861) was a legislative act passed in British India, to regulate the Police. It outlined the structure, functions, powers, and duties of the police. It vested the administration of the police in the Inspector-General of Police.

It defined the powers and responsibilities of police officers in maintaining public order, preventing and detecting crimes, and enforcing laws. Inspector-General was to be responsible to the provincial government and the superintendent was to the civilian collector.

The Act has been widely condemned for its colonial perspective of policing, which has led to the police forces across majority of the states prioritizing obedience, discipline, and control rather than community welfare. This has often led to violations of citizens' rights, lack of police accountability, or developing procedures for public grievances, besides allowing political meddling. Despite orders by the Supreme Court of India to replace the colonial era police act with a modern law, many states have shown partial or non-compliance for political reasons, and refused to repeal the law as the 1861 Act enforces political control over the police forces, as policing is a state responsibility by the Constitution of India.

== Context ==
The Police Act, 1861 stands as one of the foundational laws that established a formal policing framework in India. It was enacted by the Imperial Legislative Council in the aftermath of the 1857 revolt, which led to the British Crown taking direct governance of India from the East India Company.

The Act's main objective was to develop a disciplined and loyal police force that would support the colonial administration, quell insurrections, and uphold public order. This legislation defined the organization and operations of police forces, instituting a centralized and hierarchical system that continues to have a significant impact in India today.

== History and implementation ==
=== Before independence ===
The Police Act, 1861, enacted on March 16, 1861, and coming into effect on March 22, 1861, marked a significant transformation in the policing framework of India.

The act mandated the dissolution of military police and the establishment of a civil constabulary tasked with maintaining law and order. A new administrative structure for civil police was introduced, featuring an inspector-general overseeing operations in each province, responsible to the provincial government, while the superintendent was under the civilian collector and oversaw the village police. The hierarchy within the police force was reinforced for the first time in Indian history, with the creation of ranks such as Inspectors, Head Constables, Sergeants, and Constables, facilitated by the District Superintendents of Police who supported the Inspector-General, alongside several Assistant Superintendents of Police. Historically, the upper echelons of the police force were predominantly occupied by Europeans, with Indians mainly serving in lower ranks; however, this structure began to evolve. The act also placed a strong emphasis on enhancing village policing, which was to be supervised by local magistrates, and included recommendations for improving police salaries to better align with those of military services.

Furthermore, the establishment of the Provincial Civil Service in 1892 marked an additional step in the ongoing reformation of the police system.

=== After independence ===
After India became an independent republic, the Indian Constitution came into effect. It made policing a state subject, hence the state governments were given the responsibility to provide their communities with a police service. Most have adopted the 1861 act without change, while others have passed laws heavily based on the 1861 act. State police laws such as Bombay Police Act, 1951, the Kerala Police Act, 1960, the Karnataka Police Act, 1963, and the Delhi Police Act, 1978, were largely passed by respective state governments based on the Police Act, 1861.

The Indian Police Service was created under Article 312(2), XIV of the Constitution of India in the year 1948. It replaced the Indian Imperial Police service, which was formed in 1905. The Indian Police Service, despite being a part of the civil services, is still governed under the Police Act.

== Criticism ==
According to this legislation, every province was required to appoint an Inspector-General of Police, while each district would be managed by a superintendent of police. The police force was placed under the executive authority of the government, particularly under the district magistrate, which granted political leaders significant power over policing issues. The responsibilities assigned to the police by the act encompassed crime prevention, law and order maintenance, crime investigation, and the regulation of public gatherings. However, the legislation did not address citizens' rights, police accountability, or procedures for public grievances, rendering it more of a means of control than a service to the community. Furthermore, the act does not deal with the problems at grassroot functioning of police forces, such as shortage of resources like weapons, vehicles, use of scientific resources like forensics to solve crimes and collect evidences, along with shortage of personnel.

The act has been frequently criticized for its colonial perspective, prioritizing obedience, discipline, and control rather than public welfare. It positions the police as an arm of the governing authority rather than a service for the community, which degrades trust by citizens towards law enforcement. As of 2025, numerous Indian states still function under the Police Act, 1861 or its slightly altered iterations. This has resulted in ongoing challenges, including political meddling, misuse of authority, insufficient transparency, botched investigations, and diminished public confidence in law enforcement agencies.

Due to the act being in effect even in 2025, the colonial era mindset and old generation training methods have effectively caused negative impact on police recruits after being assigned postings. This has led to instances of refusal to file reports in certain cases, especially against political elites or politically connected criminals, harassment of civilians for personal, political or financial gains, or victim blaming, which often happens with rape survivors or women who face sexual harassment. In such instances, errant officials either face suspensions or transfer instead of dismissal from service as well as punishment from the judicial system, which translates the lack of accountability towards the general public, as the Police Act mostly holds officials accountable to the political elite, whether in power or opposition. Furthermore, the 1861 act allows politicians in power to influence promotions and transfers, besides using brutal force on events like peaceful protests, or moral policing. The act also allows political figures to have police personnel suspended or transferred if they refuse to obey oral orders of any political leaders or diktats, or use other means to impose false charges to deter the officials from performing their duties.

Additionally, the act allows senior police officials and other law enforcement personnel to formulate and enforce draconian and arbitrary rules/laws in the name of law and order, most of which are unconstitutional and have led to controversial implications, besides litigations in courts. Despite judgment from the courts that strike down such arbitrary rules, police officials continue to defy the court orders and enforce these laws. Furthermore, the act has not kept pace with infrastructure of policing while dealing with and investigation of certain crimes such as cybercrime and terrorism, specifically like the 2008 Mumbai attacks, as the police officers were equipped with antiquated and outdated World War II weapons. Cases of moral policing have also been attributed to the colonial mindset from the 1861 act, although the law itself does not authorize moral policing.

The 1861 act, which is in effect across the majority of states, has faced sustained criticism for career stagnation of non-gazette personnel, particularly the constabulary, as they get either one or two promotions, along with mandatory over time. As a result of this, many new officers across constable and sub-inspector ranks often resign due to lack of fixed working hours and absence of incentives for merit based promotions. Apart from career stagnation, the act has not kept pace with the increase in demand for personnel, which has resulted in staffing shortages and a lower police-to-population ratio below the UN standards.

== Attempts to reform ==
Throughout the years, there have been many attempts at reform. A pivotal moment occurred in the Prakash Singh v. Union of India (2006) case, in which the Supreme Court provided directives aimed at improving police operations. These directives included establishing fixed tenures for officers, separating law enforcement from investigative duties, and forming police complaints authorities. In reaction to this, the Model Police Act, 2006 was created to update and repeal the antiquated 1861 legislation with a framework focused on the rights and needs of the public. However, the comprehensive implementation of these reforms across various states has been sluggish and uneven. Nevertheless, the Supreme Court orders have made serious effects, such as to prevent forced confessions in police custody, which has now been made inadmissible in courts.

The 2006 verdict by the Supreme Court eventually passed an order for Police reforms to all the states, which mandated the creation of Police Complaints Authority, a State Security Commission, rules and tenure to select a Director General of Police (Head of Police Force), separate personnel for criminal investigation and law and order, a police establishment board to improve infrastructure for police work and ensure well-being of junior officers, and passing a new police law that will vastly differ from the 1861 act. However, the implementation has been lackluster, as some have showed partial compliance to all directives, while some have refused to comply fully due to loss of political control over the police force. Furthermore, the Police Complaints Authority have been criticized for being lame-duck institutions that lack real power to take down errant police personnel accused of misconduct, as well as delaying justice by covering up their actions. The Supreme Court verdict also did not address creating promotion pathways for constabulary, who form bulk of the force, as they retire with none to just one or two promotions, as well as fixed working hours and improving working conditions.

== Summary ==
In summary, although the Police Act, 1861 was instrumental in establishing the framework for policing in India, its colonial roots and antiquated design render it increasingly misaligned with the principles of a modern democratic society. There is an urgent necessity to replace it with updated legislation that prioritizes citizens' rights, accountability, and transparency to achieve significant police reform in India.

Although new criminal laws were enacted in 2024, such as Bharatiya Nyaya Sanhita, 2023, Bharatiya Nagarik Suraksha Sanhita, Bharatiya Sakshya Act, 2023, which replaced the Indian Penal Code, Code of Criminal Procedure, 1973, and the Indian Evidence Act, 1872 respectively, which had its colonial roots, the Police Act, 1861 continues to be in force. While many state governments promised reforms, they resisted making the institutional changes, which included bringing a new Police Act that will reduce political interference, ensure accountability to the general public, promote career growth, and improve working conditions of police personnel.

== See also ==
- Law enforcement in India
- Indian Police Service
