= Hero Impulse =

- Manufacturer: Hero MotoCorp Ltd. (Formerly Hero Honda Motors Ltd.)
- Production: 2011–2017
- Class: Dual-sport
- Engine: 149.2 cc (9.10 cu in)
- Transmission: 5-speed constant mesh
- Suspension: Telescopic fork, hydraulic shock absorbers, and swingarm with mono suspension with Nitrox
- Brakes: Front: 240 mm disc
- Tires: 90/90 19 – 52 P, and rear 110/90 17 - 60 P
- Wheelbase: 1,360 mm (54 in)
- Dimensions: L: 2,100 mm (83 in); W: 820 mm (32 in); H: 1,160 mm (46 in)
- Fuel capacity: 11.1 litre (Min) - 2.6 litre (usable reserve)

The Hero Impulse is a motorcycle produced by Hero MotoCorp Ltd. Production was discontinued in 2016, sales were stopped in 2014 due to poor demand. Hero later released Hero XPulse 200 adventure motorcycle as a successor to this motorcycle.
