= Hero XPulse 200 =

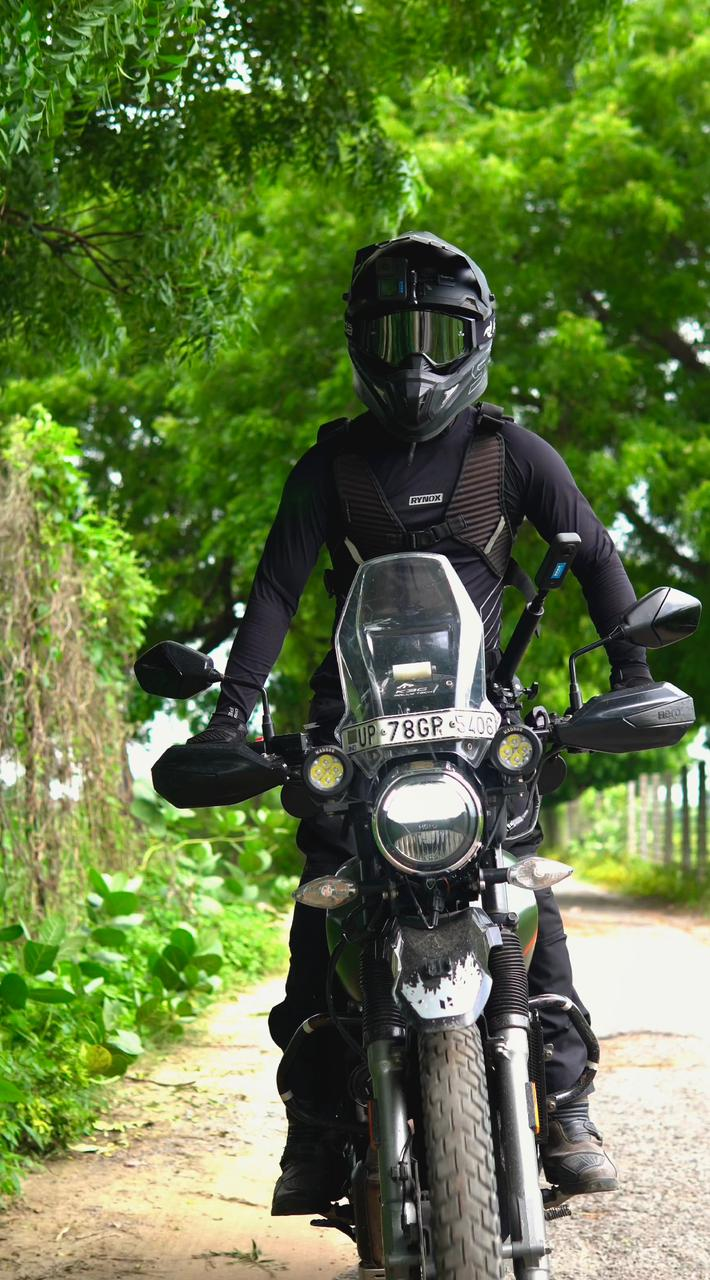
- Manufacturer: Hero MotoCorp
- Parent company: Hero MotoCorp
- Production: 2019-present
- Assembly: India
- Predecessor: Hero Impulse
- Class: Dual Sport
- Engine: 199.7 cc (12.19 cu in) Oil cooled, 4 Stroke 2 Valve and 4 Valve Single cylinder OHC
- Bore / stroke: 66.5 mm × 57.5 mm (2.62 in × 2.26 in)
- Compression ratio: 10:01
- Power: 17.8 bhp(13.3 kw) @ 8500 RPM
- Torque: 16.45 Nm @ 6500 RPM
- Ignition type: Digital DC CDI Ignition System
- Transmission: 5 Speed Manual Chain Driven with Multi Plate Wet Clutch
- Frame type: Tubular Diamond
- Suspension: Original:Front:Telescopic (37 mm Dia) with Double DU Bush (190 mm Stroke); Rear:10 step Rider-adjustable Monoshock
- Brakes: Original:Front:276 mm Petal disc, Single Channel ABS; Rear:220 mm Petal disc
- Tires: Original:90/90-21F; Rear:120/80-18
- Wheelbase: 1,410 mm (56 in)
- Dimensions: L: 2,222 mm (87.5 in); W: 850 mm (33 in); H: 1,258 mm (49.5 in)
- Seat height: 823 mm (32.4 in)
- Weight: 157 kg (346 lb) (wet)
- Fuel capacity: 13 L (2.9 imp gal; 3.4 US gal)

The Hero XPulse 200 is a dual sport motorcycle manufactured by the Indian brand Hero MotoCorp.It was first premiered in the Auto expo, February 2019 and was launched on 1 May 2019.

== Model history ==
The history of the XPulse starts with the introduction of the Hero Impulse. The Impulse was India's first adventure bike in the 150cc segment. Since its inception, the bike has received a lot of appreciation from buyers because of its amazing body but due to the low power of the bike and lack of proper marketing, the Impulse failed. After the commercial failure of the Impulse, Hero MotoCorp decided to fill the void in the segment with the addition of a higher displacement ADV motorcycle named the XPulse 200. Unlike the Impulse, the new XPulse is an adventure tourer motorcycle.

Hero first unveiled the motorcycle at the EICMA Show in Italy. The XPulse 200 carries forward the legacy of the Impulse, but it is more accessible and more purposeful. The motorcycle has been updated to comply with the newest, more stringent emission norms. Upon its introduction, the XPulse 200 was praised for its good suspension and off-road ability, while some criticism was directed at the relatively low power output of the engine. The motorcycle also has longer intervals between servicing and oil changes.

Powering the XPulse 200 BS6 is a 199.6cc, single-cylinder engine that now features an oil-cooled setup instead of the air-cooled layout on the BS4 model. The updated motor produces 17.8 bhp of power at 8,500rpm and 16.45Nm of torque at 6,500rpm. The engine is mated to a five-speed gearbox. Hero offers the XPulse 200 BS6 in a single variant with fuel-injection. The carburettor version has been discontinued.In 2021 Hero updated the bike with a 4 valve.This improved the breathability of the engine and increased the highway touring capability.A more hard core offroading variant called Rally edition(Xpulse PRO) was also introduced in 2022 with adjustable front forks,10-step adjustable rear suspension, rally spec tyres and increased seat height and GC.Painted in white the Rally edition gets Hero motosports rally team-inspired graphics and CS Santhosh's signature on the tank.

== Design ==
=== Engine ===
The Xpulse 200's engine was designed and produced by Hero from the ground up and shares little to no parts with other contemporaries in the company's line-up. The motor generates a power output of 17.8 bhp at 8,500 rpm (13.3 KW) and a maximum torque of 16.45 Nm at 6,500 rpm. The engine also includes an oil cooler, a first among motorcycles manufactured by Hero, India. Due to the emission norms in India BS-IV regulation has been applied and now the New XPulse 200 comes with Fuel Injection Technology in India. The engine is mated to a 5-speed constant mesh transmission.Bs6 update added a 4 valve that bumped the power and torque figures.The 4v engine now generates 18.8 bhp power and 17.35 nm torque.The Rally edition however has 0.1 hp more than the normal variant.

=== Frame and chassis ===
The XPulse 200 has a tubular diamond frame. Suspension is telescopic in the front while the rear is provided with monoshock suspension. Front forks are 37 mm with 190 mm of travel and the rear suspension offers 180 mm of travel. The motorcycle has a ground clearance of 220 mm. The motorcycle has a 276 mm disc at the front and a 220 mm single piston caliper disc at the rear.

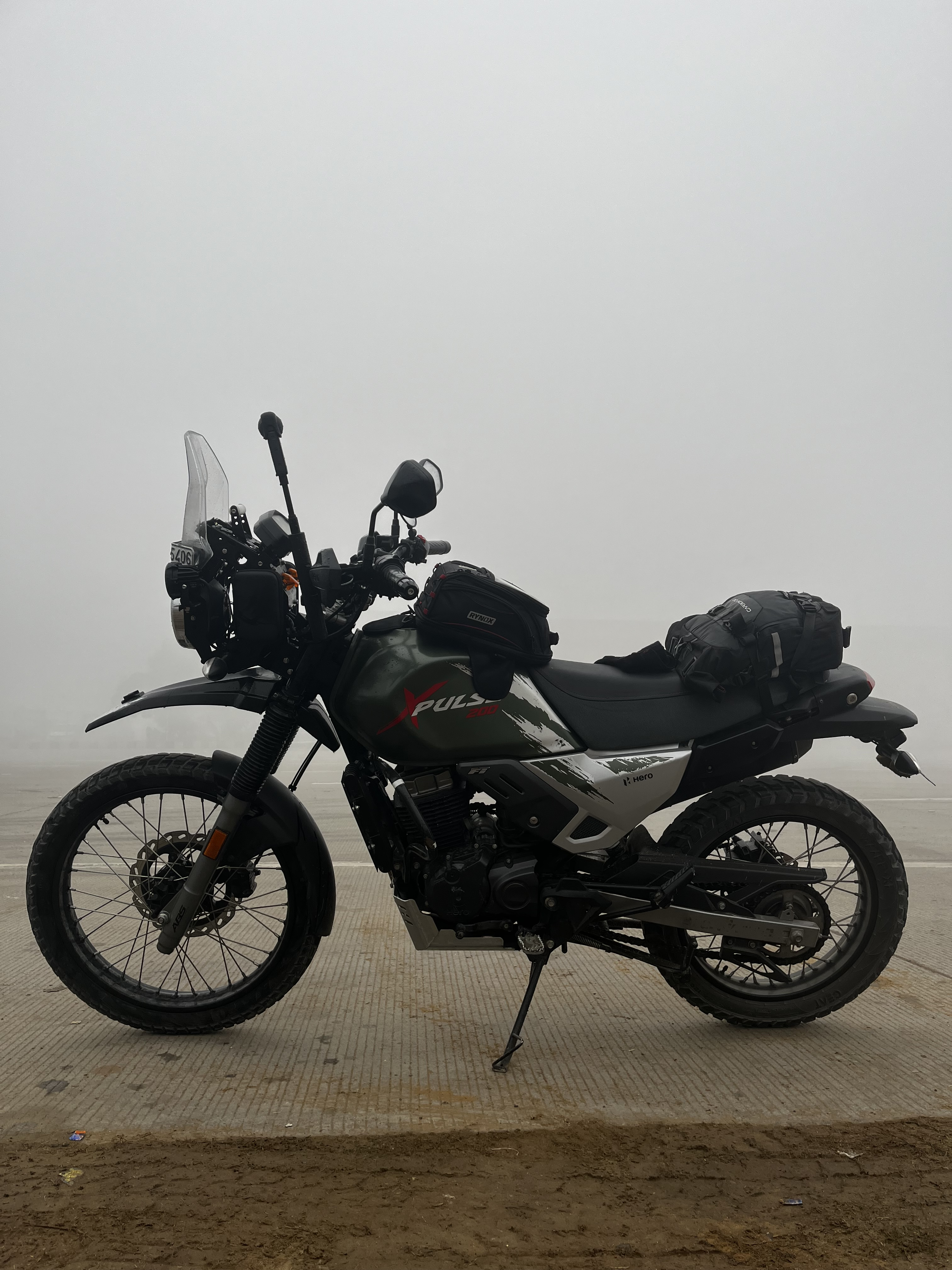

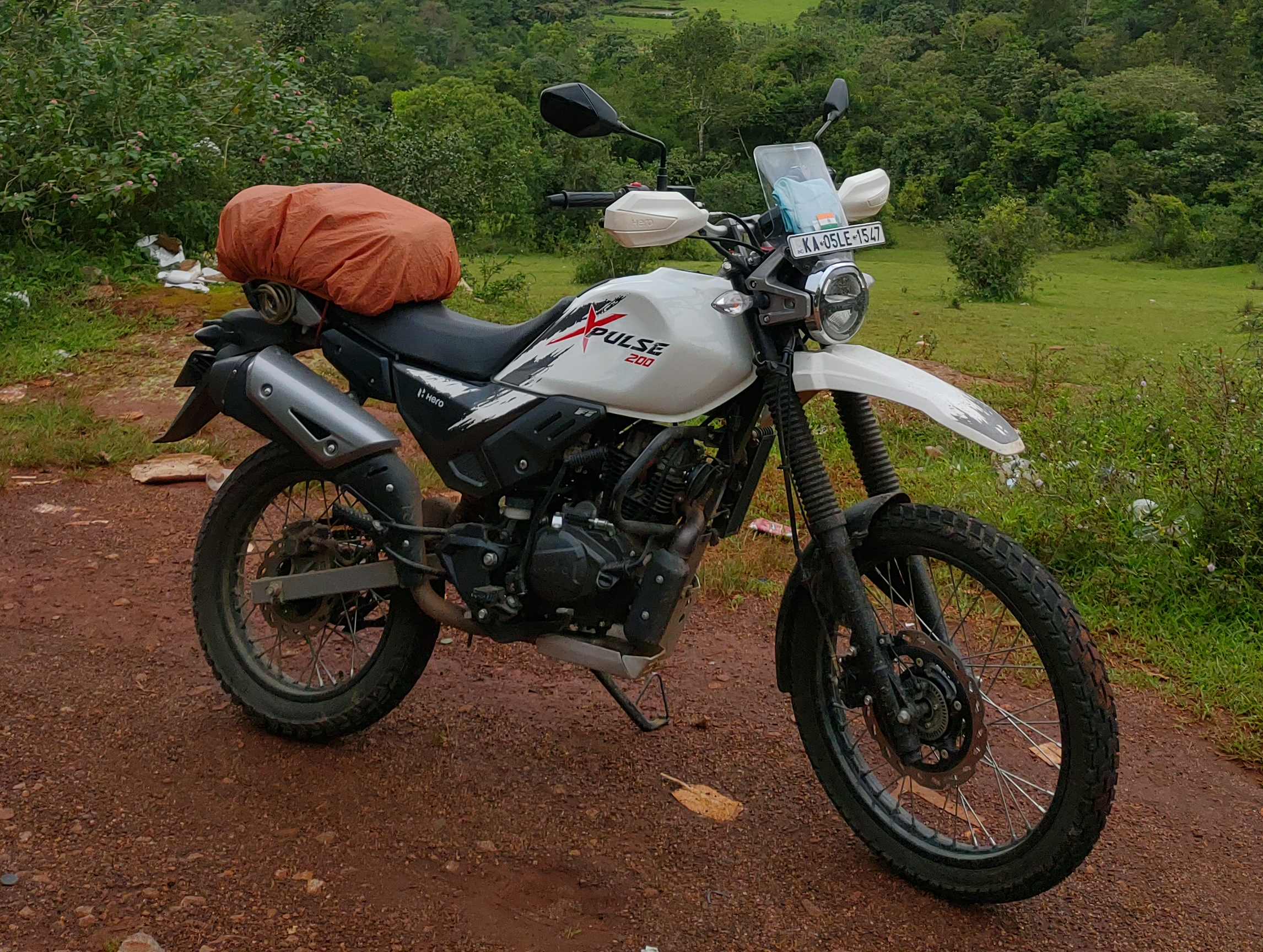
Hero Xpulse 200 2021 model (with rally kit)
