= National Counter Terrorism Centre =

Proposed Indian federal anti-terror agency

The National Counter Terrorism Centre (NCTC) was a proposed federal anti-terror agency to be created in India, modelled on the National Counterterrorism Center of the US. The proposal arose after the 2008 Mumbai attacks a.k.a. 26/11 attacks where several intelligence and operational failures revealed the need for a federal agency with real time intelligence inputs of actionable value specifically to counter terrorist acts against India. The proposal has however met with much criticism from the Chief Ministers of various states who saw it as a means of weakening India's federalism, So finally the proposal was discarded saying already exists coordinating mechanisms in the system and government denied the need of NCTC.

== Background ==
The terrorist attacks on Mumbai in 2008 was unprecedented in its scale and intensity and betrayed gaping holes in India's intelligence network with respect to the collection and coordination of intelligence and action between various agencies of the state and Union governments. While the Maharashtra Government was accused of having failed to act on intelligence inputs provided prior to the Mumbai attacks, it countered that the inputs were vague and no pre-emptive action could have been taken based on these inputs. The attacks and the government's response to them led to the resignation of the Union Home Minister Shivraj Patil and he was replaced by the Finance Minister P. Chidambaram who stated that one of his first tasks was to establish a strong federal counter terror agency that could co-ordinate with the states effectively by integrating intelligence inputs from the states.

It was in this context that the NCTC was mooted as an apex body, a single and effective point of control for all counter terrorism measures. The NCTC is modelled on the American NCTC and the British Joint Terrorism Analysis Centre. The model for India was mooted by the then Home Minister, P. Chidambaram, who along with the then National Security Adviser, M.K. Narayanan, had visited the US in 2009 to study the functioning of the US' NCTC.

== Structure and functions ==
The NCTC will derive its powers from the Unlawful Activities Prevention Act, 1967. It is to be a part of the Intelligence Bureau and will be headed by a Director who will report to the Director IB and the Home Secretary. But the modified original draft of NCTC says that this system does not come under purview of Intelligence Beaureu and states are taken into confidence before the centre carries on any operation in their territories. The NCTC will execute counter-terror operations and collect, collate and disseminate data on terrorism besides maintaining a data base on terrorists and their associates. It would have also been granted powers to conduct searches and arrests in any part of India and formulate responses to terror threats.

== Opposition ==
Unlike the American NCTC which deals only with strategic planning and integration of intelligence without any operational involvement or the Joint Terrorism Analysis Centre, which too plays a purely coordinating role, the Indian agency will have not only intelligence functions but also powers to conduct operations. It is this concentration of powers that has had the states objecting to the NCTC, arguing that such sweeping powers vested in a Central agency will violate the autonomy of state governments, given that law and order is a state subject according to the Constitution. It has also been argued that given the establishment of the National Investigating Agency in the aftermath of the 26/11 attacks, the establishment of an NCTC would only add to the bureaucratic tangle in intelligence sharing and counter terrorist action.

It is also argued that the nature of US and Indian federal structures differ vastly and hence suitable amendments are needed for the agency to be effective while guaranteeing the constitutional rights of the states. Some strategic experts like B.Raman of the R&AW have pointed out that there are significant loopholes which may still be used in selectively targeting states for political ends. The UPA govt has stuck to its decision to set up NCTC and has promised to resolve all concerns amicably. The Union Home Ministry is also believed to be making extensive changes on the NCTC proposal.

The initial opposition to the NCTC also focused on how the agency had been empowered to search and arrest people without keeping the state government, police or anti-terror squad in the loop. The Centre even mooted that the Directors General of Police and the chiefs of anti-terror squads of all states be made members of the Standing Council of the NCTC. These senior police officers are to be informed before the NCTC conducts an operation in their state but the fate didn't turn out shining.

== See also ==
- Law enforcement in India
- List of Indian intelligence agencies
