= Andhra Pradesh Prohibition and Excise Department =

Agency overview
- Employees: Bank

Jurisdictional structure
- Operations jurisdiction: Andhra Pradesh, IND
- Legal jurisdiction: State of Andhra Pradesh
- General nature: Civilian police

Website
- www.excisehpfs.ap.gov.in/ap/index.php/site/login

The Andhra Pradesh Prohibition and Excise Department is the law enforcement agency for excise in the Indian state of Andhra Pradesh.The Department enforces laws related to liquor, narcotics, psychotropics and Medicines that contain alcohol and narcotics.

== Duties ==
The agency's duties are to:

- Ensure that the Excise Revenue is protected and collected according to the acts and rules.
- Prevent illegal production of liquor and its trafficking.
- Prevent the trafficking of Narcotic Drugs.
- Campaign against Alcoholism.

== Revenue ==
The Excise Revenue is the second largest source for the State Government.
