= Telangana Excise =

Telangana Excise Department

Agency overview
- Formed: 6 May 2015 (11 years ago)
- Preceding agency: Andhra Pradesh Excise Department

Jurisdictional structure
- Operations jurisdiction: Telangana, IND
- Area: 114,840 km^{2} (44,340 sq mi)
- Population: 35,193,978
- Legal jurisdiction: Telangana, India
- General nature: Civilian police

Operational structure
- Elected officer responsible: Jupally Krishna Rao, Minister for Prohibition and Excise
- Agency executive: E Sridhar, Commissioner of Excise

Website
- https://excise.telangana.gov.in/

The Telangana State Excise Department is the law enforcement agency for excise in the Indian state of Telangana. The department enforces laws related to liquor, narcotics, psychotropics and medicines that contain alcohol and narcotics. The department was created when the state of Telangana was formed in 2014. The first minister to take charge of this department was T Padma Rao from the Telangana Rashtra Samithi party. In December 2023, Jupally Krishna Rao was appointed as the Minister of Telangana Excise under the Revanth Reddy Ministry.

== Duties ==
The agency's duties are to:

- Ensure that the excise revenue is protected and collected according to the acts and rules.
- Prevent illegal production of liquor and its trafficking.
- Prevent the trafficking of narcotic drugs.
- Campaign against alcoholism.
- Implement the Abkari policy formulated by the state government every year.

== Revenue ==
The Excise Department is one of the major sources of revenue in the state, producing Rs 25,000 to 30,000 crore per year.
