= Department of Excise & Taxation, Haryana =

Government ministry in Haryana, India

Government of Haryana Department of Excise & Taxation, Haryana

Agency overview
- Formed: 1966
- Jurisdiction: Government of Haryana
- Headquarters: Haryana Civil Secretariat, Sector-1, Chandigarh; 30°45′40″N 76°48′2″E
- Minister responsible: Dushyant Chautala
- Agency executive: Captain Abhimanyu Singh Sindhu, Cabinet Minister
- Website: https://haryanatax.gov.in/HEX/appmanager/HexPortal/HaryanaExcise?JSESSIONID=0fkGbYzLvPGQS1Gtn4hlH3g5dMGK70LcXrjJPt6F9BtymnNlMQC5!1168247579

Department of Excise & Taxation, Haryana is a Ministry and department of the government of Haryana in India.

== Description ==
This department came into existence when Haryana was established as a new state within India after being separated from Punjab. Dushyant chautala is the cabinet minister responsible for this department from October 2019.

== See also ==
- Government of Haryana
