= Special Tactical Unit =

- Abbreviation: STU

Agency overview
- Formed: 8 July 2013
- Employees: 30

Jurisdictional structure
- Operations jurisdiction: Odisha, India
- General nature: Local civilian police

Operational structure
- Headquarters: Bhubaneswar, Odisha, India
- Parent agency: Special Operation Group (Odisha Police)
- Data for organisation as at July 2013.

The Special Tactical Unit (STU) is a police tactical unit of the Odisha Police (OP) in Odisha, India. They specialise in urban warfare operation scenarios including anti-irregular military, apprehension of armed and dangerous criminals, combat patrol, counterinsurgency, covert operation, hostage rescue situations, HUMINT, protecting high-ranking officials at risk of assassination, providing security in areas at risk of attack or terrorism in Bhubaneswar, special operations, support crowd control, and urban counterterrorism.

== History ==
After the 26 November 2008 Mumbai attacks, the state of Maharashtra started an urban counter terrorism force called Force One. Later, Andhra Pradesh also started a similar force called Organisation for Counter Terrorists Operations (OCTOPUS). A similar unit, called Special Tactical Unit, was unveiled by Jugal Kishore Mohapatra, the Chief Secretary of Odisha, on 8 July 2013. After the 7 July 2013 Bodh Gaya bombings, the STU was deployed for security for the first time during the 2013 Puri Ratha-Yatra on 10 July 2013.

== Organisation and role ==
The STU is derived from the Special Operation Group (SOG) of the Odisha Police, which is an anti-Naxalite division specialising in jungle and guerilla warfare. STU personnel have been trained by the National Security Guard (NSG) at Manesar, Haryana, and specialise in urban scenarios including hostage situations. In the future, the STU will be independent of the SOG and also act as a SWAT unit. They will be also used to protect military installations like the Chandipur missile test range and monuments like the Jagannath Temple, Puri. The unit as of July 2013 has 30 personnel and it hopes to induct 30 more personnel in the second phase. The plan is to gradually raise the numbers to 100.

== See also ==
- District Voluntary Force (Odisha Police)
- Counter Insurgency Force (West Bengal Police)
- Force One (Mumbai Police)
- Greyhounds (Andhra Pradesh Police)
- Punjab Police SWAT Team
- Kerala Thunderbolts (Kerala Police)
- Special Operations Group (Jammu and Kashmir)
