= Punjab Police =

Punjab Police may refer to:

- Punjab Police (India), which operates in the Indian state of Punjab
  - Punjab Police SWAT Team, SWAT team of the Punjab Police in India
  - Punjab Police FC, an Indian association football club
- Punjab Police (Pakistan), which operates in the Pakistani province of Punjab
