= Greyhounds (police) =

Tactical police units in India

- Abbreviation: GHS

Agency overview
- Formed: 1989
- Employees: ~3,000 (2020)

Jurisdictional structure
- Operations jurisdiction: Andhra Pradesh; Telangana; Odisha; Chhattisgarh
- Legal jurisdiction: Andhra Pradesh; Telangana

Operational structure
- Overseen by: Government of Andhra Pradesh; Government of Telangana
- Headquarters: Visakhapatnam, Andhra Pradesh; Hyderabad, Telangana
- Ministers responsible: Vangalapudi Anitha, Home Minister of Andhra Pradesh; Anumula Revanth Reddy, Home Minister of Telangana
- Agency executives: DGP, Andhra Pradesh; DGP, Telangana
- Parent agency: Andhra Pradesh Police; Telangana State Police

Notables
- Person: K. S. Vyas, IPS, for raising Greyhounds
- Significant engagements: Naxalite–Maoist insurgency
- Award: Deputy Assault Commander K. Prasad Babu, AC (posthumous)

Greyhounds is a police special forces unit of the Andhra Pradesh and Telangana Police in India. They specialise in counter-insurgency operations against Naxalite-Maoist militants.

Several Indian paramilitary and police officers have described the Greyhounds as among the best anti-insurgency forces that specialises in anti-Maoist operations and as experts in jungle warfare.

== History ==
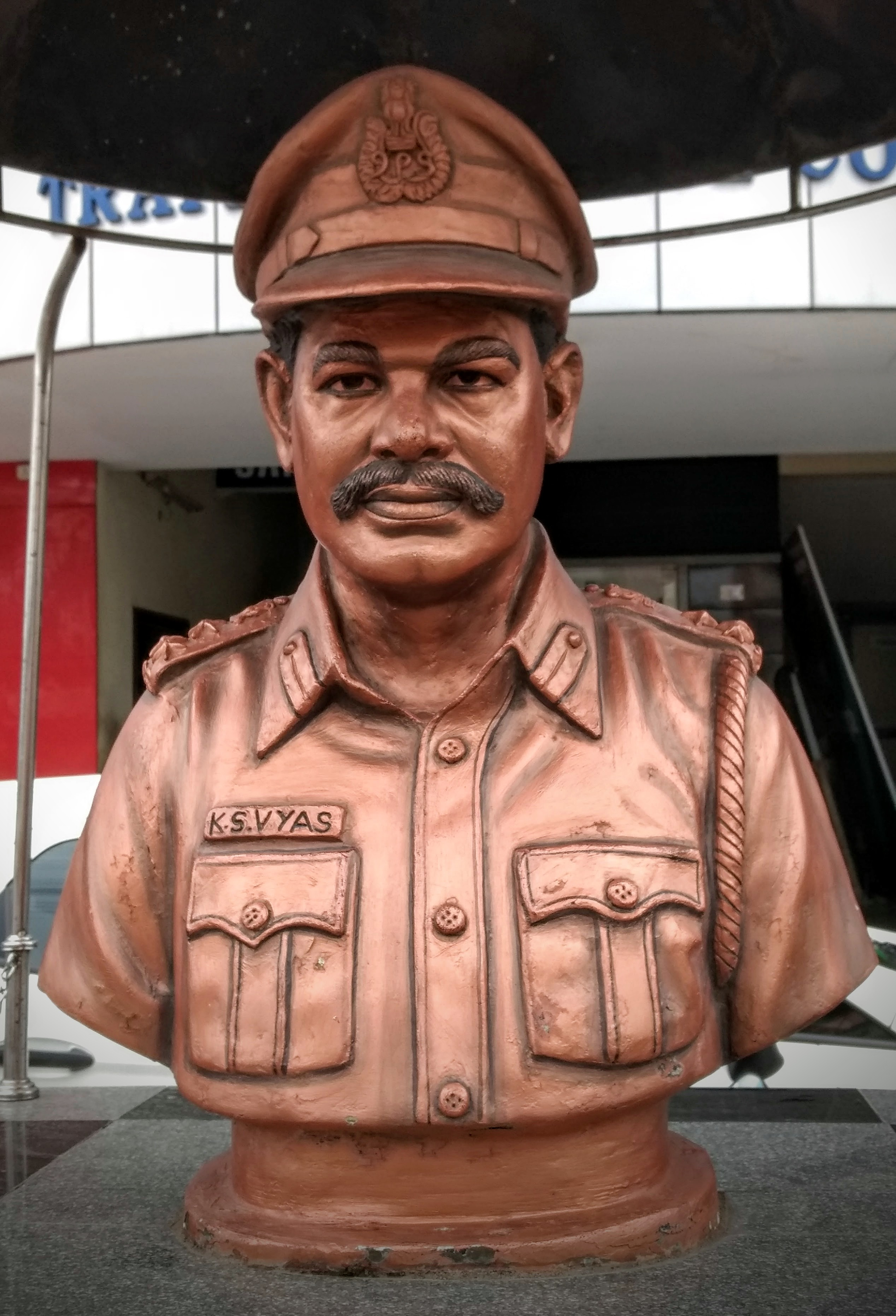
Bust of Greyhounds founder K. S. Vyas in Vijayawada, Andhra Pradesh.

Greyhounds was initiated in early 1989 by the TDP government after some Maoists killed several top landlords in Prakasam District, and its training program was introduced by the Indian Police Service officer K. S. Vyas. Directly as a consequence of founding the unit, Vyas became the top target on the Communist Party of India (Marxist–Leninist) People's War's hit list. Although he eventually was moved out of the Greyhounds, he continued to consult regularly on operations. Vyas was assassinated at gun point by Mohammed Nayeemuddin, and four other members of the CPI (M–L) People's War, on 27 January 1993 while taking an evening jog at Lal Bahadur Shastri Stadium in Hyderabad. Greyhounds commandos of Telangana Police gunned down Nayeemuddin at the Millenium Township in Shadnagar, 48 km from Hyderabad, on 8 August 2016.

The Government of Andhra Pradesh approved the establishment of a new operations and training base for Greyhounds in August 2020. The government provided 385 acres of land at Jagannadhapuram village in the Annadapuram mandal. It is expected to be operational in 2022. Andhra Pradesh Greyhounds had been based in Visakhapatnam following the founding of Telangana in 2014.

== Operations ==
Andhra Pradesh had been a long-time Maoist militant hotbed but the presence of Greyhounds, supported by paid informers at the village level, managed to arrest or kill several top leaders. Greyhounds from Andhra Police and Telangana Police continue to operate jointly even after the bifurcation of Andhra Pradesh. Greyhounds generally operate as small units of 15-30 commandos each that conduct combing operations in jungles. Local police are often included in Greyhounds operations but they typically play a minimal role and primarily serve as translators or help in navigation. At times, local police do not receive advance information about Greyhounds operations.

All Greyhounds commandos are under the age of 35 years in order to ensure agility, strength and stamina. When a member of the force turns 35, they are automatically transferred to civil police. They are specifically trained for deep forest pursuit and combat. Greyhounds commandos are expected to be able to trek 20–30 km of hilly, jungle terrain for a single operation. They may be required to remain in the jungle for a period of over 5–6 days at a stretch, and must be capable of subsisting on a ration of dry fruits. This is because building a fire to cook a meal could expose their position. Greyhounds personnel, as well as Naxalites and Maoists, are also at risk of contracting malaria due to the terrain they operate in.

Over 1,780 Maoists were killed by police between 1995 and 2016 with police recording 163 casualties. In the period between 2008 and 2017, police killed 700 Maoists and lost 3 officers in the line of duty. Around 80% of the kills were credited to Greyhounds commandos, who also accounted for about 20% of the total police casualties.

=== 2008 Balimela attack ===
A group of 60 Greyhounds commandos, 5 police officers and a boat operator, were ambushed by Maoists on 29 June 2008, while returning to Andhra Pradesh through the Sileru River on board a motorboat belonging to the Odisha Irrigation Department, after conducting an unsuccessful combing operation in Odisha. Shortly after departing Janbai, Odisha, the boat was ambushed and sunk by an unknown number of Maoists. The assailants, located on the surrounding hills, attacked the boat while it was passing through a narrow passage of the Balimela Reservoir with light machine guns, self-loading rifles, grenades, and automatic weapons such as AK-47s and AK-56s. The grenades thrown at the boat caused it to capsize and sink. Thirty-eight people died in the attack, including 32 Greyhounds personnel, all 5 police officers, and the boat operator, resulting in the highest death toll for the Greyhounds in a single attack. Some Greyhounds personnel were captured by Maoists and killed in custody. Search parties later recovered the remains of Greyhounds personnel with hands bound behind their back. Twenty-seven Greyhounds survived mostly by swimming to safety. The Communist Party of India (Maoist) claimed responsibility for the attack. Odisha Home Secretary T.K. Mishra stated that the Greyhounds had made a "tactical blunder" by traveling in one boat and should have undertaken their journey earlier in the morning.

Patel Sudhakar Reddy, leader of the central committee of the CPI (M), who police accused of being involved in the Balimela attack and several other major crimes, including the murders of Home Minister Alimineti Madhava Reddy, Greyhounds founder K.S. Vyas, IPS officer Umesh Chandra and the attempted murder of Chief Minister N. Chandrababu Naidu at Tirupati in 2003, was killed during a combing operation by Andhra Police in May 2009. Police had received specific intelligence regarding the location of Maoists in the Lavella forest area in Tadwai mandal of Warangal district. His colleague Venkaiah, a CPI (M) district committee member was also killed in the encounter.

=== 2014–present ===
Following the 2014 general elections, the Ministry of Home Affairs altered its anti-Maoist tactics. The Home Ministry felt that counter-insurgency operations in the neighbouring states of Chhattisgarh and Odisha were not effective because the Central Reserve Police Force (CRPF) personnel sent to respond to Maoist violence lacked adequate local knowledge of the region to be successful, and due to the weaknesses of local police in those states. The Ministry appointed Greyhounds as the lead anti-Maoist force in all extremist affected areas and authorized the unit to freely operate in Chhattisgarh and Odisha. Unlike other state and local police, Greyhounds do not require prior permission to conduct operations outside their legal jurisdiction.

On 24 October 2016, Greyhounds conducted their largest operation across the Andhra-Odisha border since the Balimela attack. The force had received intelligence regarding a high-level meeting of CPI (Maoist) leadership near Ramaguda, Odisha. Greyhounds commandos reached the area armed with INSAS and AK-47 rifles. Thirty Maoists were killed in the operation including 2 state committee members (SCM), 6 divisional committee members (DCM) and 2 area committee members (ACM). Greyhounds also recovered weapons, including those that had been taken from captured Greyhounds personnel. Senior Maoist leader Ramakrishna alias RK, and his son Munna alias Vikram, managed to flee the raid. However, the operation nearly wiped out the region's top Maoist leadership, damaged morale among cadres, and weakened their hold over the region. Senior Maoist leaders such as Uday, Ramakrishna alias RK, and Chalapathi went into hiding. The operation occurred just 3 days after the Supreme Court had requested the Union Government and the Government of Chhattisgarh to begin peace talks with Maoists.

Following the Ramaguda raid, Greyhounds, Andhra and Telangana Police, with active support from the Government of Odisha and its law enforcement agencies, stepped up surveillance and combing operations in the Andhra-Odisha border region with the goal of eliminating the leadership of the CPI (M)'s Andhra Pradesh-Odisha Border Special Zonal Committee (AOBSZC). Security forces conducted several operations over the subsequent years targeting AOBSZC members. Gemmeli Narayan Rao alias Jambri, the DCM of the Galikonda area committee was killed in an encounter with Greyhounds in Annavaram on 24 February 2017.

Greyhounds, and special police personnel from Odisha, Chhattisgarh and Maharashtra, conducted combing operations in the Pujari Kanker area near the Telangana-Chhattisgarh border in March 2018. On 2 March, the unit located and gunned down 10 Maoists, including six female insurgents, in the Pujari Kanker forest. CPI (Maoist) Telangana State Secretary Haribhushan alias Jagan, his wife Sammakka, Khammam-Karimnagar-Warangal Zone Secretary Damodar and Khammam district In-charge Sambaiah were among those presumed to be killed. Greyhounds constable B. Sushil Kumar, from Vikarabad, was killed during the operation. The CPI (M) denied that Haribhushan alias Jagan had been killed and issued a press release and an audio recording vowing revenge to support their claim. The statement also claimed that 8 of the 10 Maoists killed were from Dantewada and Sukma in Chhattisgarh, and that only 2 Telangana Maoists from Hanmkonda had been killed in the encounter. In June 2021, Chhattisgarh Police stated that Haribhushan alias Jagan had died after contracting COVID-19, which was later confirmed by the CPI (Maoist).

Combing operations were increased in the Andhra-Odisha border region during 21–28 September 2019 when the CPI (M) celebrates its Formation Day in the red corridor. AP Greyhounds located and killed 3 Maoists on 22 September near Gummirevula in Vishakhapatnam district, and 2 Maoists in the Eastern Ghats forests the next day. All 5 were members of the Galikonda area committee. By 2020, Odisha's Border Security Force, Special Operation Group, and District Voluntary Force, had established camps on its side of the border, and the CRPF established new outposts on the Andhra side. In June 2020, Visakhapatnam Police Superintendent, Attada Babujee, stated that security forces had pushed Maoists into a 1,500 sq km area of the Andhra-Odisha border and cut off top leadership from mid-levels and cadres. Intelligence officials claimed that the courier system used by Maoists to communicate in the region had nearly collapsed. Muttannagari Jalandhar Reddy alias Krishna, who was involved in the Balimela attack, surrendered to Andhra Police in April 2021. CPI (M)'s Indravati area committee member Siddaboina Sarakka alias Bharatakka died in June 2021 after contracting COVID-19.

Greyhounds killed 6 Maoists including Ranadev alias Arjun (DCM), Sande Gangiah alias "Dr" Ashok (DCM), and Santu Nachike (ACM) near Theegalametta village in Koyyuru mandal in June 2021. Ranadev's death was a major setback for the CPI (M) as he had been a party member for over 20 years and was described as "among the few committed Maoist leaders left in the region". The next month, 6 Maoist leaders surrendered to Andhra Police including DCM of the Pedabayalu-Korukonda area committee Chikkudu Chinna Rao alias Kundram Sudhir Raju, DCM and Divisional Commander Vanthala Vannu alias Mahita, and 3 ACMs.

== Equipment ==
The primary weapons used by Greyhounds are L1A1 Self-Loading rifles, Heckler & Koch MP5 carbines, AK-47s with under-barrel grenade launchers, 5.56 mm INSAS rifles, 9 mm pistols, and IWI Tavor rifles. The Maoists they face use weapons that are often captured from police including AK-47s, AK-56s, 9 mm carbines, Lee Enfield .303 rifles, L1A1 Self-Loading rifles, grenades, double and single-barrel shotguns, and country-made weapons.

Greyhounds vehicles include helicopters and jeeps. Greyhounds units communicate with their home base through satellite phones or VHF sets equipped with scramblers to avoid interception, as Maoists have the capability to intercept radio communication.

InBody supplies body composition analysis machines to the Greyhounds.

== Commanders ==
- R.K. Meena - Additional Director General of Police (Operations), Andhra Pradesh
- K. Sreenivasa Reddy - Additional Director General of Police (Operations), Telangana
- Jagadeesh P., Assault Commander (AP)
- Krishnakanth G., Assault Commander (AP)
- Krishnakanth Patel, Assault Commander (AP)
- Tushar Dudi, Assault Commander (AP)
- V.N. Manikanta Chondolu, Assault Commander (AP)

== Gallantry awards ==
- Inspector and Deputy Assault Commander K. Prasad Babu - Ashoka Chakra 2013 (posthumous)

== See also ==
- Counter Insurgency Force (West Bengal)
- Special Operation Group (Odisha)
- Force One (Mumbai Police)
- Special Operation Group (Odisha)
- Punjab Police SWAT Team
- Kerala Thunderbolts (Kerala)
