= Force One (police) =

Specialised unit of the Mumbai Police

Agency overview
- Formed: 26 November 2010

Jurisdictional structure
- Operations jurisdiction: Maharashtra, India
- General nature: Local civilian police
- Specialist jurisdiction: Counter terrorism, special weapons operations; protection of internationally protected persons, other very important persons, or state property

Operational structure
- Headquarters: Mumbai
- Agency executive: Mr. Krishna Prakash (IPS), ADGP-Force One
- Parent agency: Maharashtra Police

Force One is a police tactical unit of the Mumbai Police to guard the Mumbai metropolitan area, one of the largest metropolitan areas in the world, formed by the Government of Maharashtra on the lines of National Security Guards (NSG). It specialize in anti-irregular military, apprehension of armed and dangerous criminals, counter-sniper, counterterrorism and hostage rescue crisis management, executive protection, high-risk tactical law enforcement situations, operating in difficult to access terrain, and providing security in areas at risk of attack or terrorism. It was formed under Maharashtra Police, as a response to the 2008 Mumbai terror attacks and was commissioned two days before its first anniversary at the time of establishment Shri Jayant Patil was State Home Minister of Maharashtra. On the occasion, Maharashtra Chief Minister Ashok Chavan also laid the foundation stone of the Force One's headquarters in Mumbai. One of the primary tasks of the unit will be to protect the Maharashtra Legislature as well as several politicians within the state.

== History ==
In the wake of the 2008 Mumbai terror attacks, the Government of Maharashtra decided to form a new, specialised force to tackle terror. It was commissioned on 24 November 2009 on SRPF Ground of suburban Goregaon, Mumbai. The initial training of the unit was made under the help and supervision of Israeli Police Special Forces (Yamam). From Maharashtra Police, 1996 batch IPS Officer Chiranjeev Prasad was tasked as SP- Force One and played a crucial role in raising the force. After two months of basic training by Israeli specialists, Force One was founded. Force One headquarters is to be spread over 96 acres (390,000 m^{2}) inside the lush green Aarey Milk Colony at Goregaon in northwest Mumbai, and the first batch has 216 elite commandos.

Out of 3,000 applications from the state police force who volunteered to be part of the force - many of whom were part of 26/11 response team - 261 personnel were selected and trained in Pune, apart from the College of Military Engineering and the High Energy Materials Research Laboratory of the Defence Research and Development Organisation (DRDO).

=== Recruitment and training ===
The recruitment for Force One is undertaken among young volunteers from Maharashtra Police who are already well trained. Only around 4-5 percent of total applicants succeed. The maximum entry age for constabulary personnel is 28 years and is 35 years for officers.

The commandos of Force One are trained at Maharashtra Intelligence Academy, the College of Military Engineering, Pune, and Defence Research and Development Organisation (DRDO), in the use of sophisticated arms and explosives, and are known for their rapid shooting skills. While the NSG has a regional hub in Mumbai, Force One is expected to be part of the initial response to a terror strike in Mumbai.

== Influence on other units ==
The Force One have trained the police force of Mozambique.

Force One trains all the Quick Response Teams of Maharashtra Police and are involved in training the Railway Protection Force and the Jammu and Kashmir Police.

== Equipment ==
=== Weapons ===
Name	Country of origin	Type	References
Glock 17	Austria	Semi-automatic pistol	
Glock 19	Austria	Semi-automatic pistol	
Smith & Wesson M&P	United States	Semi-automatic pistol	
CornerShot	Israel	Weapon accessory	
Benelli M1	Italy	Shotgun	
Benelli M3	Italy	Shotgun	
Heckler & Koch MP5	Germany	Submachine gun	
FN P90	Belgium	Submachine gun	
Brügger & Thomet MP9	Switzerland	Submachine gun	
SIG SG 550	Switzerland	Assault rifle	
M4 Carbine	United States	Assault rifle	
M16 rifle	United States	Assault rifle	
AKM	Soviet Union	Assault rifle	
IWI Tavor X95	Israel	Assault rifle	
IWI TAR 21	Israel	Assault rifle	
M107 rifle	United States	Sniper rifle	
Barrett Model 98B	United States	Sniper rifle	

=== Vehicles ===
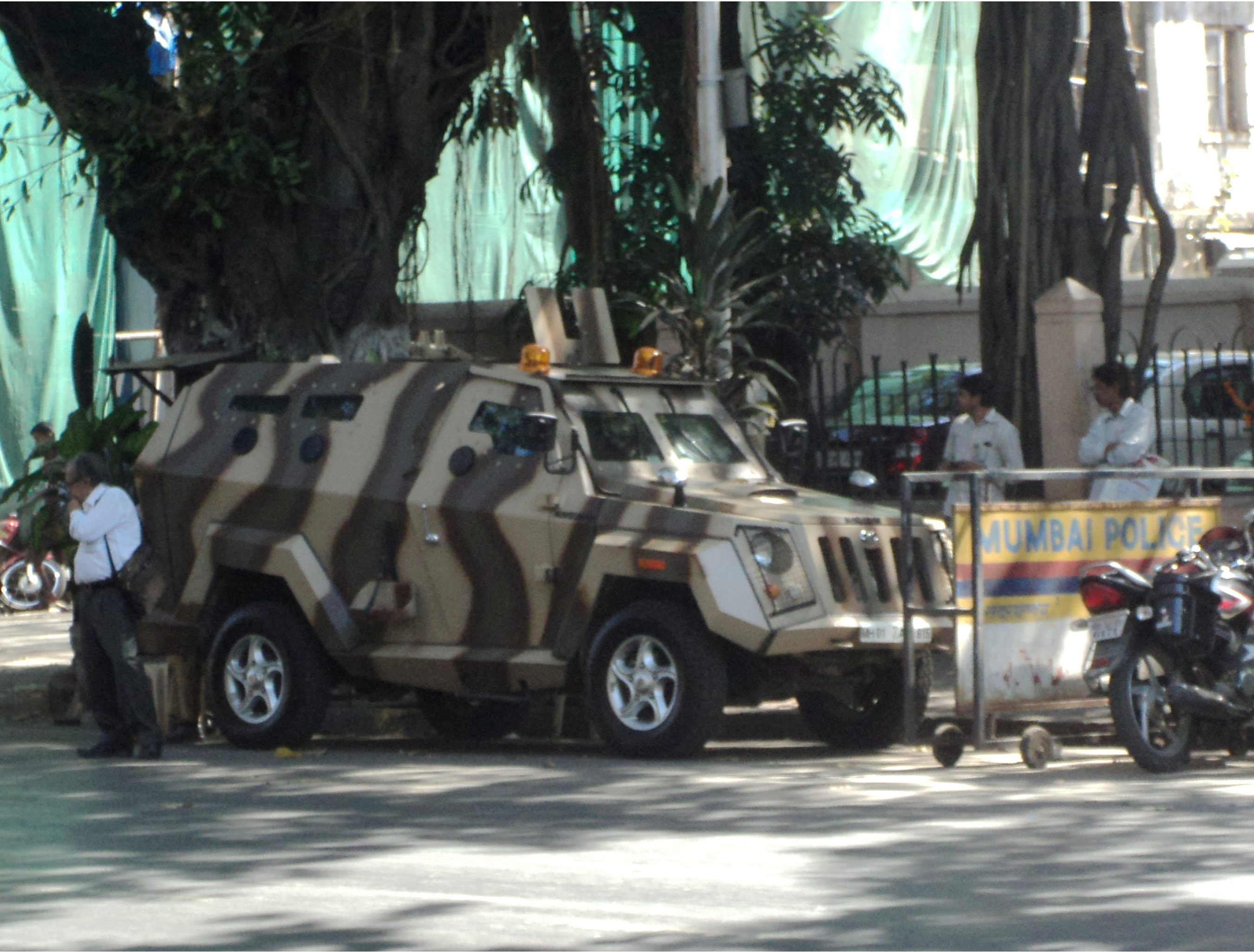
Mumbai Police Mahindra Marksman as used by Force One

- Mahindra Marksman
- Tata LATC
- Mahindra Rakshak

== See also ==
- Counter Insurgency Force (West Bengal)
- Special Operation Group (Odisha)
- Greyhounds (police)
- Special Operations Group (Jammu and Kashmir)
- Punjab Police SWAT Team
- Kerala Thunderbolts (Kerala)
