= DVF (disambiguation) =

DVF may refer to:

- Diane von Fürstenberg (DvF), a Belgian fashion designer and her fashion company
  - The DVF Awards
- District Voluntary Force, a special constabulary unit of the Odisha Police

== See also ==
- House of DVF, an American reality television series
