= 2015 Gurdaspur attack =

2015 terrorist attack of a police station in Gurdaspur district, Punjab, India

- 2015 Gurdaspur attack (Punjab)
- Location: 32.128255°N 75.469683°E; Dina Nagar, Gurdaspur district, Punjab, India
- Date: 27 July 2015; 5:30 am (IST)
- Target: Punjab police, civilians and Indian Railways
- Attack type: Mass shooting
- Weapons: AK-47s, Night Vision Device, Grenades, GPS devices
- Deaths: 10 (including 4 policemen, 3 terrorists and 3 civilians)
- Injuries: 15
- Perpetrator: Lashkar-e-Taiba
- Defenders: Punjab Police; Punjab SWAT; J&K Police SWAT Team; Indian Army (On Standby); National Security Guard (On Standby)

On 27 July 2015, three Lashkar-e-Taiba militants dressed in army uniforms opened fire on a bus and then attacked the Dina Nagar police station in Gurdaspur district of Punjab, India. The attack resulted in the death of three civilians and four policemen, including a superintendent of police; fifteen others were injured. In addition, five bombs were found planted on the Amritsar–Pathankot line on a rail-bridge near Parmanand railway station, five kilometers from the site of the attack. All three attackers were killed in the operation, which lasted almost 12 hours.

Such terrorist attacks were rare in Punjab after the Insurgency, which sought to form an independent Sikh nation of Khalistan, ended in the 1990s. However, such attacks are common in the Disputed Territory of Jammu and Kashmir that borders Gurdaspur, where Islamist insurgents are seeking independence or accession to Pakistan and from where the gunmen were at first suspected to have entered. On the basis of the GPS system found in the terrorists' possession, India claimed the insurgents infiltrated through the border with Pakistan.

== Attack ==
The attack took place in Dina Nagar, Gurdaspur district of Punjab, on the morning of 27 July 2015. At around 5:30 am, they opened fire on a Punjab Roadways bus coming from Bamial, a Small town in Pathankot District. The bus had 75 passengers, several of whom were injured. The bus driver, Nanak Chand, drove the bus towards them, forcing them to move back. He then swerved the bus and drove it straight to a government hospital, where the injured passengers were treated.

After firing indiscriminately near the bus stand, the assailants targeted a roadside eatery and took off in a hijacked Maruti 800 car with Punjab registration number. They shot dead a roadside vendor near Dinanagar bypass. They shot the driver and sped towards the Dina Nagar police station. The attackers targeted a community health centre adjacent to the police station, killing three civilians including a woman and a policeman. The gunmen then entered the police station and opened fire, seriously injuring five policemen.

The first response was led by Punjab Police Superintendent of Police Baljeet Singh, which led to the death of one of the gunmen. SP Baljeet Singh later died in the gunbattle. The Indian Army and the NSG also responded to the attack, but the Punjab Police maintained the lead on the counter-terrorism operation and assigned support roles to the Army and the NSG. A 28-man group from the Punjab Police SWAT Team coordinated a counter-assault and the last militant was killed 11 hours after the terrorist attack began. News agencies have pointed out that security forces could have ended the attack much earlier, as the gunmen were holed up in an abandoned building, but the operation was prolonged order to capture at least one gunman alive, with the assumption that they had a limited amount of food and ammunition, which could lead to an arrest. Once it was clear that none of the gunmen intended on being captured, this goal was abandoned and the SWAT Team swiftly neutralized all threats.

This was the first counter-terrorism operation conducted by the Punjab Police SWAT Team and its success has been widely praised.

According to police, the terrorists were Muslims contradicting the initial reports that the attack was carried out by Sikh separatists.

== Bombs on the railway track ==
Meanwhile, a railway trackman named Ashwani Saini, while patrolling along the railway track between Dina Nagar and Jhakholari railway stations, spotted five bombs wired to a small bridge on the Amritsar-Pathankot line, just before a passenger train was due to cross the bridge. The train stopped 200 metres from the bombs. The railway authorities suspended all the rail traffic on the section while the bomb-disposal squads defused the bombs.

== Equipment ==
According to sources at the Ministry of Home Affairs, two GPS devices, three AK-47s, ten magazines, and two China-made grenades were recovered from the terrorists.

The attackers had also shaved all body hair and erased all factory markings on their weapons, supposedly to prevent any identification.

Indian authorities also recovered a Night Vision Device from the terrorists, with US Government markings on it. US Authorities confirmed that it belonged to the American Government and was most likely stolen or misplaced in Afghanistan.

However, Indian investigators claimed to have found evidence of Pakistan's involvement in the attack.

The three terrorists who stormed a police station on the fateful day used gloves with "Made in Pakistan" tags said the panel of doctors in their autopsy report from Gurdaspur civil hospital.

The report said, "external appearance" that a "Made in Pakistan" label was found intact in the glove that one terrorist was wearing.

"After the operation was over on Monday, we had done a random search of the clothes the ultras were wearing. But no label was found in the clothes, including the undergarments," a police was quoted as saying to Hindustan Times.

== Aftermath ==
The Indian Ministry of Home Affairs stated that the attacks were carried out by Pakistan based militant group Lashkar-e-Tayiba.

During early inspection of data from global positioning sets carried by terrorists who carried out Monday's attack in Gurdaspur suggests that the group launched its operation from across the border in Pakistan's Shakargarh area, Indian government sources have told The Indian Express. Sources familiar with the investigation said the terror team is thought to have left a safehouse on the fringes of Gharot, a village not far from the Pakistani town of Shakargarh, late Sunday night. Travelling due east, the group then crossed a tributary of the Ravi River, and headed to the village of Bamial on the Indian side of the border. From Bamial, investigators believe, the group caught an early morning bus that took them to the highway 1A, which links Punjab with Jammu and Kashmir and on to Hiranagar, passing several police checkpoints along the way.

The GPS sets, which guide users along tracks marked by digital "waypoints", have often been used by terrorists to operate in unfamiliar environments, most famously during the 2008 Mumbai attacks.

== See also ==
- List of terrorist incidents in India
- List of terrorist incidents in Punjab (India)
- List of terrorist incidents, 2015
