= Nilambur incident =

Nilambur incident was a firefight between the Thunderbolts commando force of the Kerala Police and members of the banned Communist Party of India (Maoist) group.

The incident took place on 24 November 2016 in the forests of Nilambur. Kuppusamy alias Kuppu Devaraj, a Central Committee member hailing from Andhra Pradesh, and Ajita alias Kaveri were killed after a prolonged gun fight. Devaraj was a wanted person and a reward of Rs 7 lakh and Rs 10 lakh was announced by Jharkhand and Chhattisgarh state governments for his arrest.
