= Debashish Sethy =

Indian Police Constable (died 2020)

Police Constable Debashish Sethy SC
- Born: Odisha, India
- Died: 9 September 2020; KIA at Kalahandi, Odisha, India
- Police career
- Allegiance: India
- Branch: Odisha Police
- Rank: Police Constable (PC)
- Awards: Shaurya Chakra

Constable Debashish Sethy, SC was an Indian Police Constable of the Odisha Police's Special Operations Group (SOG) who was posthumously conferred India's third highest peacetime gallantry award, the Shaurya Chakra.

== Career ==
Debashish began his career with the Odisha Police Department as a constable before joining the SOG in 2016. He was from Angul district.

The Commando was killed in action in the deep forest near Sirki village in Kalahandi district on 9 September 2020, while in combat with members of the left wing extremism group during an anti-Maoist operation. Five terrorists were killed as a result of the operation.

== Shaurya Chakra awardee ==
The President of India posthumously awarded him the Shaurya Chakra, which was presented to his family by Angul SP Jagmohan Meena on 15 August 2021, in recognition of his bravery and sacrifice.
