= Mahindra Marksman =

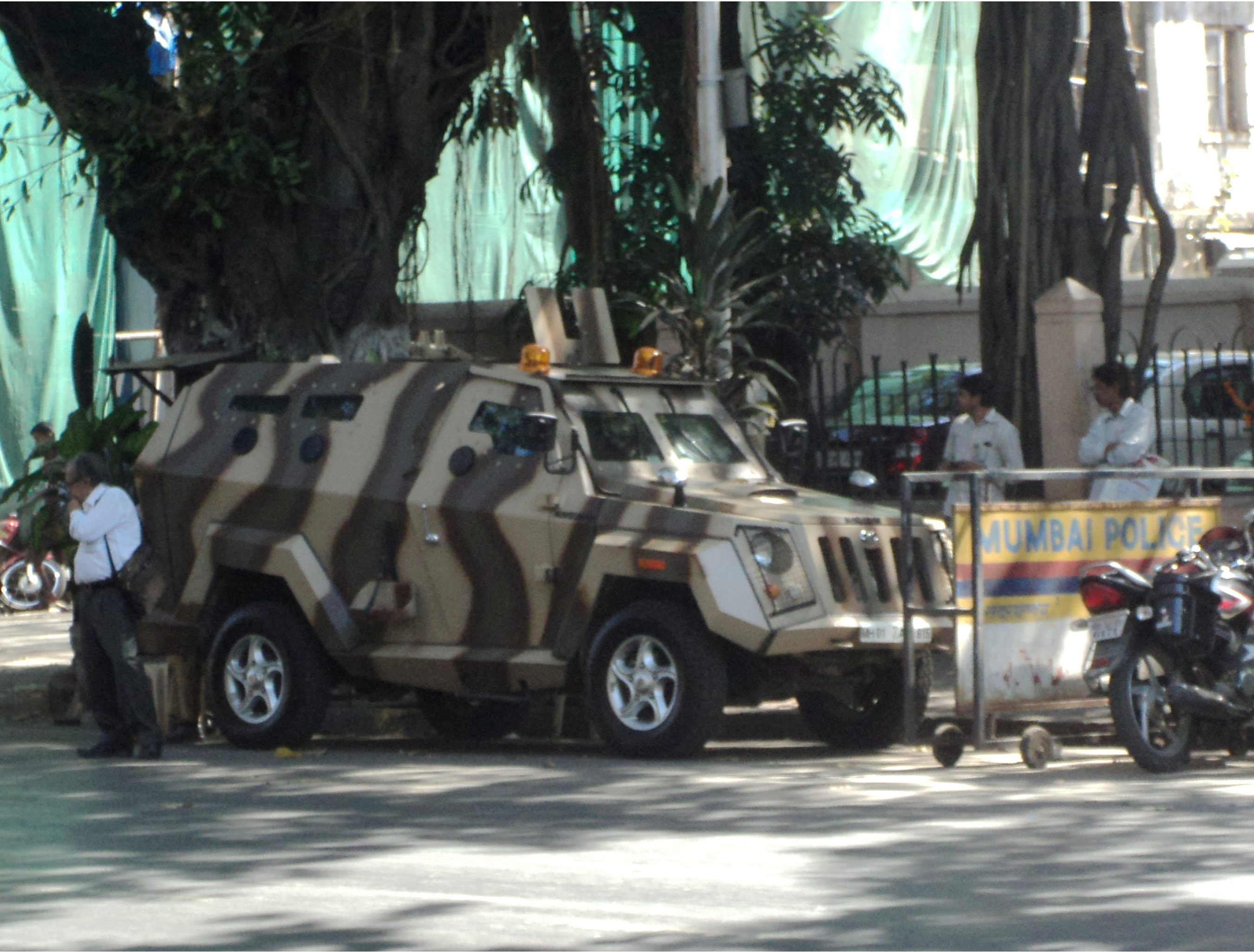
- Marksman used by the Mumbai Police
- Type: Infantry mobility vehicle
- Place of origin: India

Service history
- In service: 2009 - present
- Used by: Users

Production history
- Designer: Mahindra Defence Systems (Defense Land Systems)
- Designed: 2006
- Manufacturer: Mahindra & Mahindra Defense, Mahindra Emirates Vehicle Armouring

Specifications
- Mass: 2,600 kg
- Length: 4.39 m
- Width: 1.863 m
- Height: 2.030 m
- Diameter: 23.75 m
- Crew: 6 [2 (driver, co–driver) + 4(rear)]
- Armor: Variable level armor kits
- Main armament: remote weapon station
- Engine: 2.49 L CRDE BS-3
- Suspension: 4x4, wheeled
- Ground clearance: 240 mm
- Maximum speed: 120 KM/H

The Mahindra Marksman is India’s first armoured capsule-based Infantry mobility vehicle to provide protection to the personnel of defence, paramilitary and police forces against small arms fire and grenade attacks. It has capability to be used in counterterrorism as well as conventional roles.

== History ==
The Mahindra Marksman was first unveiled in 2009 and was first put into service by Mumbai Police's Force One and was then ordered by several other state and central police forces and by paramilitary forces including the CRPF, BSF and CISF.

== Design ==
- Sides – Can withstand three direct hits of 7.62×51mm NATO Ball M80, 7.62×39mm Ball PS and 5.56×45mm Ball M 193 at a distance of 10m at 90° angle attack.
- Top – Can withstand three direct hits of above ammunition at a distance of 10m at 45° angle attack.
- Floor – Protection against two DM 51(German norm) hand grenades detonated under the vehicle simultaneously.
- Additional protection – All joints and welding have overlap. The rear stowage boxes provide protection to crew when using the rear door.
- Cuppola has a machine gun mount with 270° traverse and protection.
- Seven crew firing ports.
- Outward facing configured rear seat and wide bulletproof windows allows total operational orientation of the crew sitting at the rear.
- Search light mounted on top of the vehicle controlled from inside the vehicle by the driver/co driver.
- Rear view camera and a TV screen for the driver and co driver to see the dead zone behind the vehicle.

== Users ==
- Chile: Used by Carabineros' Control de Orden Público.
- India: Used by Force One of Mumbai Police, Delhi Police, CISF, Jammu and Kashmir Police, CRPF and Kolkata Police.

== Gallery ==
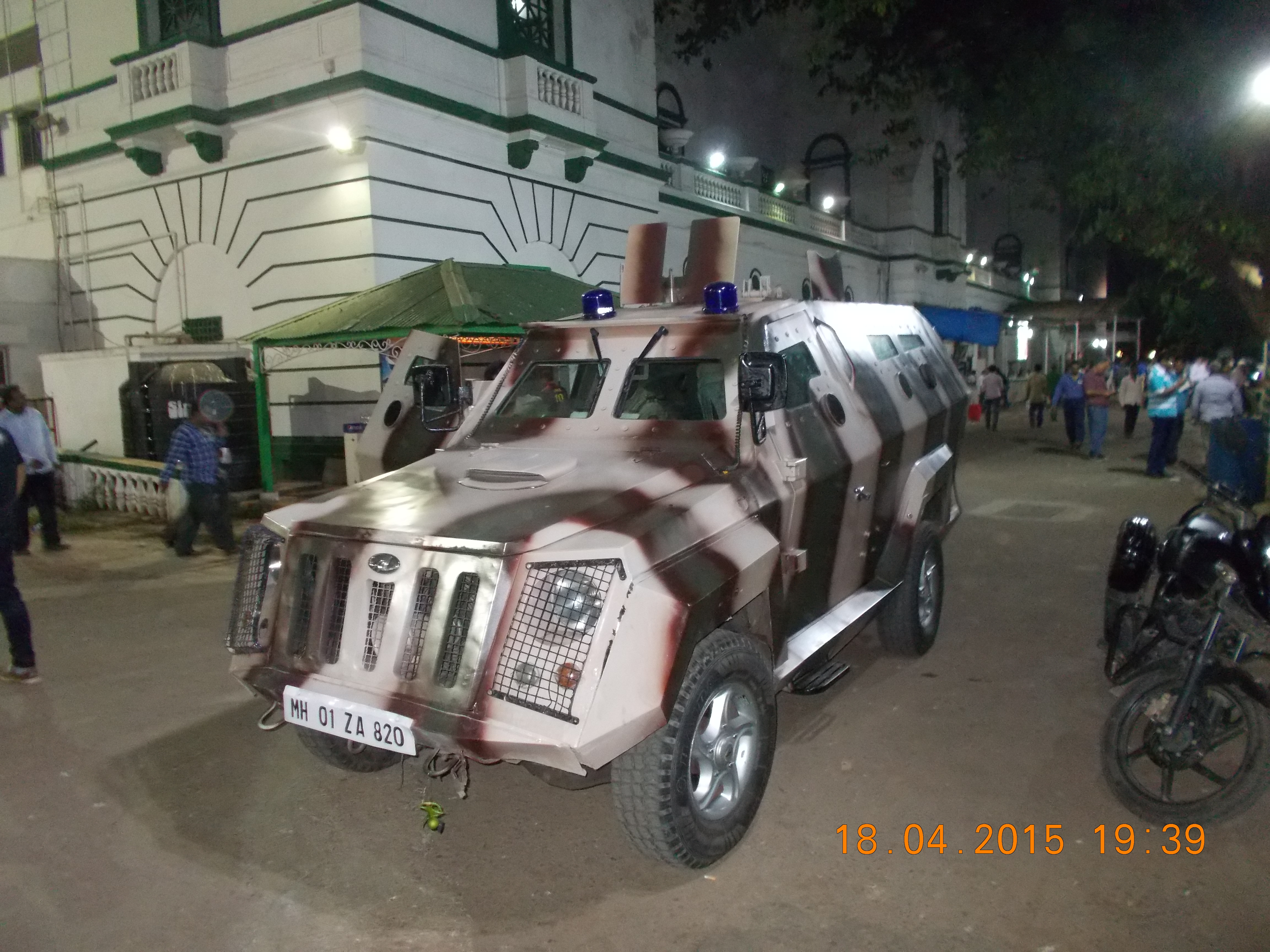
A Mahindra Marksman used by the Mumbai police

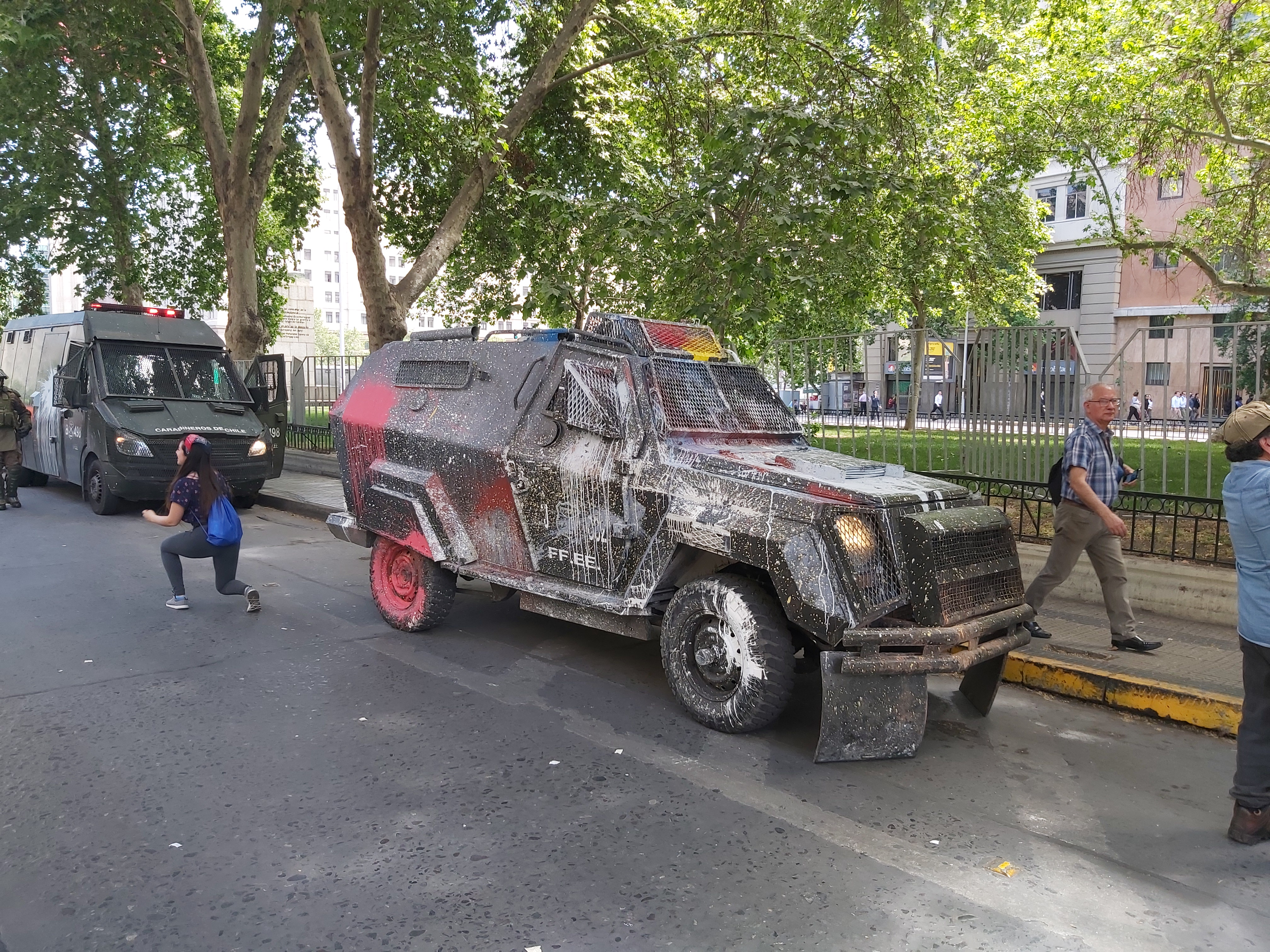
A Mahindra Marksman, colloquially known in Chile as 'zorrillo', used by Carabineros.
