= Punjab Police SWAT Team =

Tactical unit of the Punjab Police

- Active: 2011–present
- Country: India
- Agency: Punjab Police (India)
- Operations jurisdiction: The state of Punjab

The Punjab Police SWAT Team is the Police Tactical Unit of the Punjab Police.

== Overview ==
Punjab Police Special Weapons and Tactics (SWAT) was formed in 2011. They are usually tasked with protection duties. They are highly trained on the lines of National Security Guard by Israel's Mossad through private company Athena Security, deployed by the Punjab Government. All the commandos are under 28 years of age, thus making them fit and capable of tasks meant for commandos. Their main work is to fight against any terrorist attack if it occurs in Punjab State. They have been trained exclusively in Krav Maga, room intervention, close and open techniques and other secret tactics.

== Equipment ==
The SWAT is provided with:

- Bullet-resistant transport
- Light weight bullet-resistant jackets and helmets
- Hands-free radio sets
- Complete anti-trauma body suit with level-2 protection
- Riot control helmet
- Gas masks
- Shock shields
- Laser weapons
- Gas guns
- Pepper gun launcher
- Night vision device
- CornerShot

=== Weapons ===
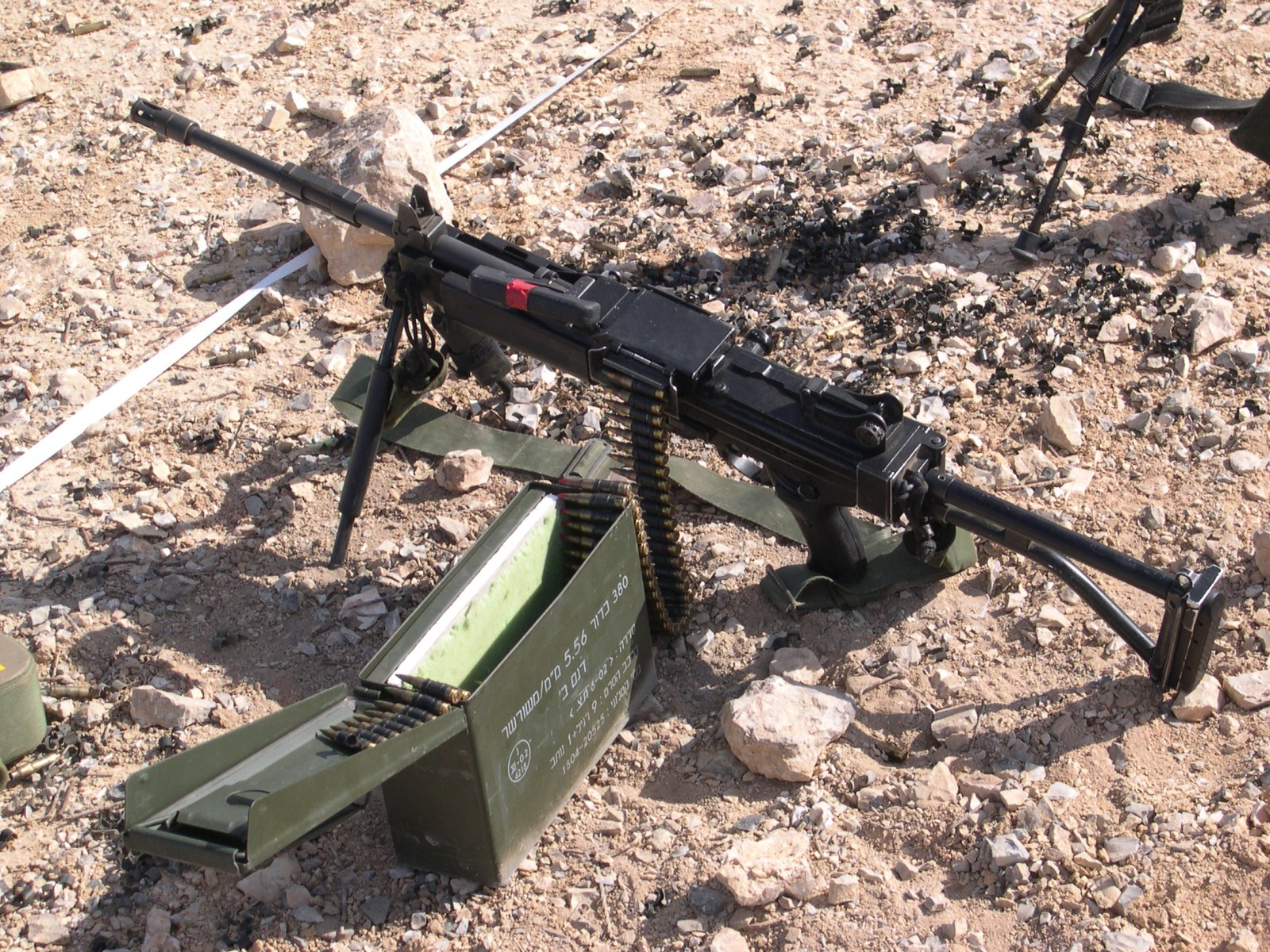
IMI Negev LMG fed from ammo box in a shooting range

Name	Country of origin	Type
Glock 17	Austria	Semi-automatic pistol
Beretta 92S	Italy	Semi-automatic pistol
Heckler & Koch MP5	Germany	Submachine gun
Brugger & Thomet MP9	Switzerland	Submachine gun
AK 47	Soviet Union	Assault rifle
MTAR 21	Israel	Assault rifle
SIG 552	Switzerland	Assault rifle
Steyr SSG 69	Austria	Sniper rifle
FN Minimi	Belgium	Light machine gun
IMI Negev	Israel	Light machine gun

== Major operation ==
- 2015 Gurdaspur attack - Punjab SWAT very efficiently handled counter-terrorism operation at Dina Nagar Police Station in 2015 Gurdaspur attack by killing all 3 suspected Lashkar-e-Taiba terrorists.

== See also ==
- Counter Insurgency Force (West Bengal)
- Special Operation Group (Odisha)
- Greyhounds (police)
- Force One (Mumbai Police)
- Special Operations Group (Jammu and Kashmir)
