= Special Operation Group (Odisha) =

Elite police unit in Odisha, India

Special Operation Group SOG

Agency overview
- Formed: 21 August 2004; (22 years ago)
- Employees: 3,000

Jurisdictional structure
- Operations jurisdiction: Odisha, India
- Map of Odisha Police Department's jurisdiction
- Area: 60,160 square miles (155,800 km^{2})
- Population: 41,947,358

Operational structure
- Headquarters: Cuttack, Odisha
- Parent agency: Odisha Police
- Child agencies: Special Tactical Unit (STU); District Voluntary Force (DVF)
- As of July 2018

The Odisha Special Operations Group or the Odisha SOG, is an elite anti-insurgency police tactical unit of the Odisha Police, primarily focused on tackling Left Wing Extremism (LWE), commonly known as Naxalism, and conducting high-risk tactical operations in the state’s interior and forested regions. that specialized in quick response to emergencies with SWAT unit tactics especially in mountainous forest areas. It was raised by the Odisha Police to combat the left-wing extremists in the state.

SOG, are actively involved in intensified anti-Naxal operations in forested and hard-to-access areas, often in joint missions with forces like the CRPF, the BSF, and the District Voluntary Force (DVF). This includes combing and search operations in jungle terrain, based on intelligence inputs, to locate and neutralise Maoist rebels. Recent coordinated operations have seen successful encounters with Maoist cadres, including neutralizing senior commanders and conducting joint operations over multiple days.

== History ==
The SOG was raised under the Odisha Police in August 2004 with the central objective of neutralizing extremist and insurgent groups within the state as part of broader internal security strategy. It was modelled to operate in challenging terrains, especially in dense forests where Left Wing Extremist activities were prevalent, drawing inspiration from similar counter-insurgency units in other states. The force has been integral to anti-Maoist efforts over the last two decades, participating in numerous combing operations and joint missions with other security agencies.

== Mission ==
The primary mission of the SOG is to counteract extremist and terrorist elements within Odisha, particularly Maoist groups, by carrying out targeted operations, reconnaissance, and area dominance measures. It is tasked with conducting proactive counter-insurgency actions, safeguarding vulnerable areas, and supporting wider security planning aimed at eliminating LWE influence in the state. These missions are oriented toward achieving the national and state goal of eradicating Naxalism by government deadlines through coordinated force application.

== Organisation ==
=== Headquarters ===
- Odisha State Police Headquarters, Cuttack
- Odisha Special Intelligence Wing (SIW), Bhubaneswar

The Special Operation Group has its Training-cum-resource centre at Chandaka in Bhubaneswar. They have a staff strength of about 1800 commandos, constituted into teams of 20-25 commandos. Each unit is self-reliant and can operate combat patrol deep inside jungle and mountain for days in search of armed extremists. The teams of SOG operate either in single team or in multiple teams depending on the scale of the operation launched. They carry the insignia of tusker and call themselves 'Kalinga Tuskers', though the use of the name 'Kalinga Tusker' is not very well known. Their motto is 'Kalingaha Sahasika', which translates roughly as 'Brave Kalinga'.

=== Training ===
Prior to the establishment of its own centralised training complex, SOG personnel underwent specialised instruction through structured field training, including jungle warfare, tactical drills, and guerrilla combat techniques, often with assistance from army and other specialised units. While news reports focus on the newer facilities, older operational context suggests that fieldcraft and combat readiness have always been integral to the unit’s ethos.

Special Operations Group (SOG) does not recruit personnel through direct public entry recruitment. Instead, the force selects police personnel internally from within the Odisha Police structure, including members of the civil police, the Odisha Special Armed Police (OSAP) battalions, and Indian Reserve (IR) battalions. The report notes that postings to the SOG are through an internal selection process rather than through a public exam route and that police personnel beyond about 35 years of age are generally not inducted into the SOG, owing to the physically demanding nature of its counter-insurgency duties.

In December 2025, a state-of-the-art Training-cum-Briefing Centre and a Counter-Terrorism Training Complex was inaugurated, designed to train up to 400 personnel at a time and enhance the unit’s tactical capabilities for both anti-insurgent and broader counter-terrorism missions.

== Functions ==
The SOG performs a range of operational and tactical duties central to Odisha’s internal security framework. As part of the Counter Insurgency Operations, the SOG leads field actions against LWE/Maoist elements in forested and remote areas, working with CRPF and other forces to locate and neutralise threats. SOG engages in high-risk specialised tactical operations that can involve ambushes, targeted combing, and decisive engagements where conventional units are less effective. SOG combines its effort with intelligence wings and other security agencies for coordinated force application based on actionable intelligence.

== Honours ==
Awardee	Award	Decoration	Year	Event
Pramod Kumar Satapathy (Posthumous)	Ashoka Chakra		2009	Republic Day (India)
Debashish Sethy (Posthumous)	Shaurya Chakra		2021	Independence Day (India)
Sudhir Kumar Tudu (Posthumous)	Shaurya Chakra		2021	Independence Day (India)

== See also ==
- Special Tactical Unit (Odisha Police)
- District Voluntary Force (Odisha Police)
- Counter Insurgency Force (West Bengal Police)
- Greyhounds (Police) (Andhra Pradesh Police)
- Kerala Thunderbolts (Kerala Thunderbolts)
- Naxalite–Maoist insurgency
- Operation Green Hunt
