= K. Prasad Babu =

Ashoka Chakra recipient

K. Prasad Babu AC
- Born: Karanam Leela Venkat Srihari Naga Varaprasad c. 1981; Marturu village, Visakhapatnam district
- Died: 17 April 2013; Andhra Pradesh - Chhattisgarh border
- Military career
- Allegiance: India
- Branch: Greyhounds special operations division of Andhra Pradesh Police
- Service years: 2004 - 2013
- Rank: [Inspector] Deputy-Assault Commander
- Awards: Ashoka Chakra (posthumous)

KLVSNV Prasad Babu AC (1981 – 17 April 2013) was an Indian police officer belonging to the Greyhounds special operations group of the Andhra Pradesh Police. In 2013 he was posthumously awarded the Ashoka Chakra, India's highest peacetime gallantry award, after he played a vital role in the death of nine Maoists and helped save the lives of four officers.

Babu is the first-ever police officer from Andhra Pradesh to be awarded the Ashoka Chakra, which is usually conferred on soldiers.

== Personal life ==
Prasad Babu was born in 1981 at Marturu, Visakhapatnam district, to Karanam Venkata Ramana Naidu and Satyavati. His full name is Karanam Leela Venkat Srihari Naga Varaprasad. His father Ramana is a retired circle inspector in the Andhra Pradesh Police.

== Police career ==
Prasad Babu joined the Andhra Pradesh Police service in 2004 and was later transferred to the elite Greyhounds division. Prasad was the in-charge officer of the Greyhounds unit deployed at the Andhra Pradesh - Chhattisgarh state border.

On 16 April 2013, a group of 70 Maoists ambushed the Greyhounds unit and bombed it. Prasad Babu led the retaliating team and played a key role in killing nine top ranked attackers and injuring others in two encounters. The police were being evacuated back by helicopters when about hundred men started attacking the helicopter. The helicopter had already performed 5 sorties and only 19 of the police were left to be evacuated. 14 of them boarded the aircraft while 5 of them including Babu stayed and provided cover.

However, as the helicopter left, more Maoists arrived and started surrounding Babu and others. Babu asked the other four policemen to leave south to a safe place while he handled about 200 of the militants. He was then caught by them and was tortured to death.

Overall, he played a vital role in the death of nine Maoists and helped save the lives of four officers.

== Ashok Chakra ==
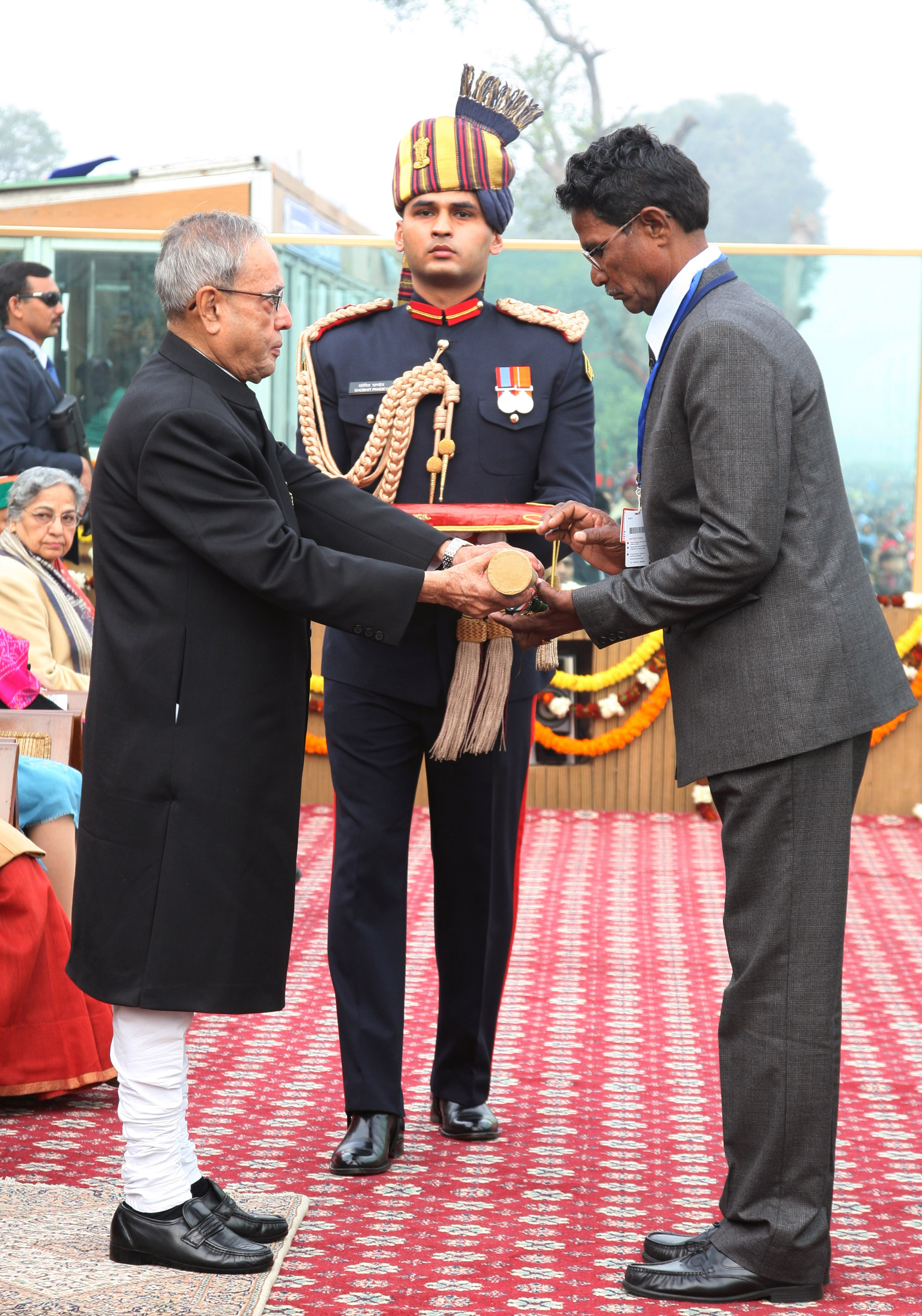
Prasad Babu's father receives the Ashok Chakra from president Pranab Mukherjee on 26 January 2014.

On 15 August 2013, he was nominated posthumously for Ashok Chakra, India's highest peacetime gallantry award. The award was received on 26 January 2014 by his father Venkata Ramana Naidu from President Pranab Mukherjee in New Delhi. Babu is the first-ever police officer from Andhra Pradesh to be awarded the Ashok Chakra, which is usually conferred on soldiers.

The citation by the President of India during the awarding of the Ashok Chakra read:

Shri Prasad Babu exhibited most conspicuous gallantry, exceptional devotion to duty and exemplary leadership in fighting the Maoists and made the supreme sacrifice.
