= Odisha Police =

State law enforcement agency in Odisha, India

Odisha Police ଓଡ଼ିଶା ପୋଲିସ
- Emblem of the Odisha Police
- Common name: Police
- Abbreviation: OP
- Motto: Seba O Nirapatta; Service and Security

Agency overview
- Formed: 1 April 1936; 90 years ago
- Employees: 72,145 (Sanctioned strength)
- Annual budget: ₹107.3 billion (US$1.1 billion) (2025–26 est.)

Jurisdictional structure
- Operations jurisdiction: 7, Odisha, IN
- Jurisdiction of the Odisha Police
- Area: 155,707 km^{2} (60,119 sq mi)
- Population: 41,947,358 (2011 Census)
- Governing body: Department of Home, Government of Odisha
- General nature: Local civilian police

Operational structure
- Headquarters: State Police Headquarters, Buxi Bazar, Kataka
- Elected officer responsible: Mohan Charan Majhi, Chief Minister and Minister of Home
- Agency executive: Vinaytosh Mishra, IPS, Director General of Police (HoPF)
- Parent agency: Government of Odisha
- Child agencies: Bhubaneswar–Kataka Police Commissionerate; Special Operation Group (SOG); Special Tactical Unit (STU); District Voluntary Force (DVF); Odisha Special Armed Police (OSAP); Odisha Disaster Rapid Action Force (ODRAF); Odisha Industrial Security Force (OISF)
- Police Districts: 32

Facilities
- Police Stations: 612

Website
- odishapolice.gov.in

The Odisha Police is the law enforcement agency of the Indian state of Odisha. Headquartered in Cuttack, it Police is headed by a Director General of Police and falls under the purview of the Home Department of the Government of Odisha. It has a sanctioned personnel strength of 72,145, with one-third of its sanctioned strength in the directly recruited posts of constable, sub-inspector, and deputy superintendent of police being allocated to women.

== History ==
Along with the formation of Odisha, the "Orissa Police" was established on April 1, 1936. The department was a force comprising 4000 trained men of all ranks. The Orissa Police Manual Rules (OPMR) was unveiled in 1940 which boasted rules and regulations of the powers, functions and duties of the police department at various levels.

== Department organisation ==
=== Ranges ===
The Odisha Police is organized into 7 Police Ranges, most of which are further divided into 32 Police Districts. The Ranges are:

- Central Range at Cuttack – Districts of Khordha, Cuttack, Kendrapara, Jagatsinghpur, Jajpur, Puri, and Nayagarh
- Eastern Range at Balasore – Districts of Balasore, Mayurbhanj, and Bhadrak
- Western Range at Rourkela – Districts of Sundargarh, Keonjhar and Rourkela
- Northern Range at Sambalpur – Districts of Sambalpur, Bargarh, Bolangir, Sonepur, and Jharsuguda
- Southern Range at Berhampur – Districts of Ganjam, Gajapati, Kandhamal, Boudh, and Berhampur
- South Western Range at Koraput – Districts of Nuapada, Koraput, Nabarangpur, Rayagada, Malkangiri, and Kalahandi
- North Central Range at Talcher – Districts of Dhenkanal, Angul, and Deogarh

Additionally, there are:

- Bhubaneswar–Cuttack Police Commissionerate at Bhubaneswar – Controls the Capital City Bhubaneswar and Twin City Cuttack
- Railway Range at Bhubaneswar – Used for the Indian Railways, SRP at Cuttack and Rourkela
- Technical Range at Cuttack – Used for Police Transportation Services

=== Divisions ===
The Odisha Police has the following organisational divisions:

- Technical
- Training
- Investigation

== Ranks ==
The Odisha Police maintains the following ranks:

- Director General of Police, IPS
- Additional Director General of Police, IPS
- Inspector General of Police, IPS
- Deputy Inspector General of Police, IPS
- Superintendent of Police, IPS / Deputy Commissioner of Police, IPS (Selection Grade)
- Superintendent of Police, OPS / Deputy Commissioner of Police, OPS (Junior Management Grade)
- Additional Superintendent of Police, IPS / Additional Deputy Commissioner of Police, IPS
- Additional Superintendent of Police, OPS / Additional Deputy Commissioner of Police, OPS
- Assistant Superintendent of Police, IPS
- Deputy Superintendent of Police, OPS / Assistant Commissioner of Police, OPS
- Inspector of Police, OP
- Sub Inspector of Police, OP
- Assistant Sub Inspector of Police, OP / Havildar Major, OP
- Head Constable / Havildar
- Lance Naik
- Constable
- Home Guard

Indian Police Service cadre officers rank insignia
Insignia
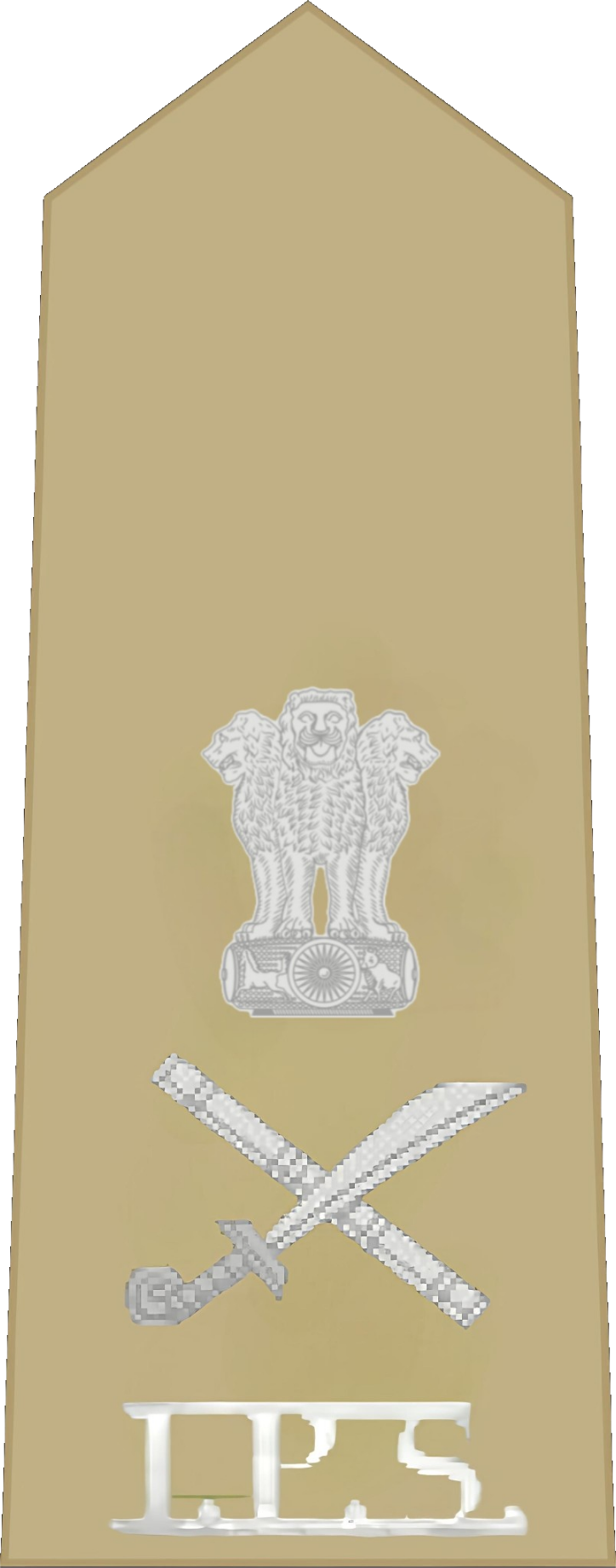
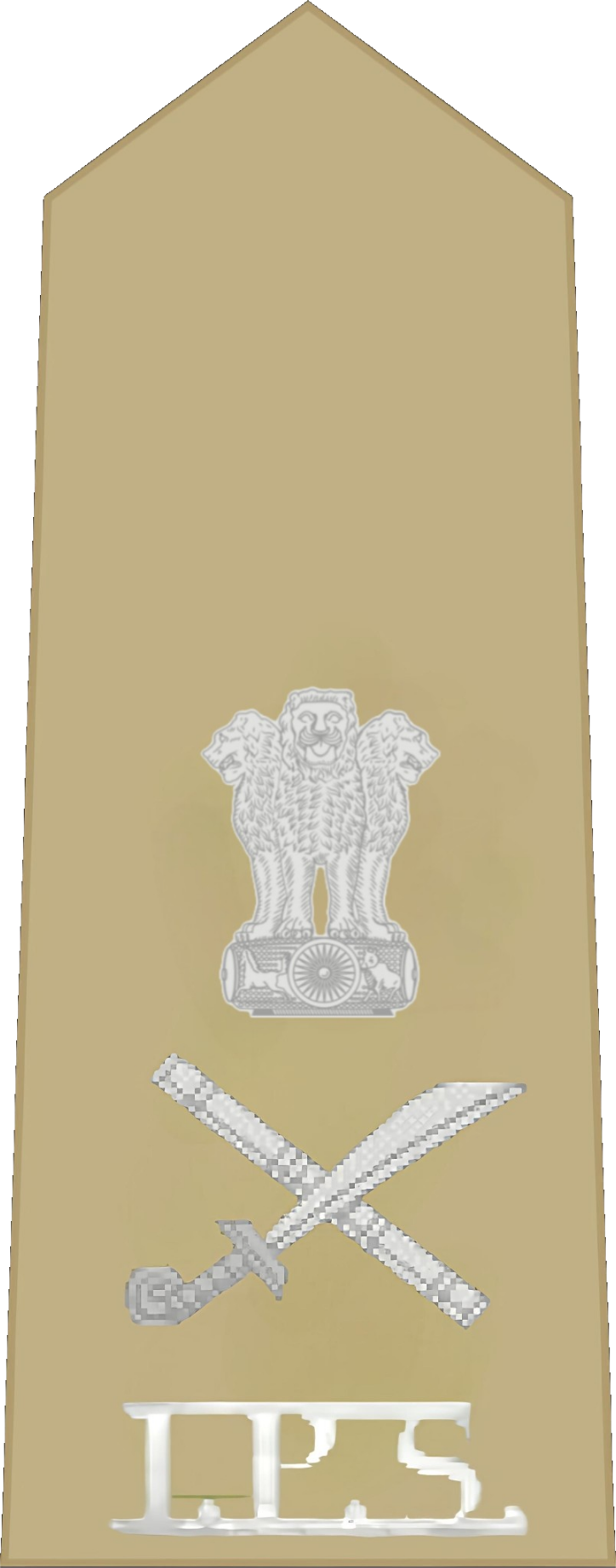
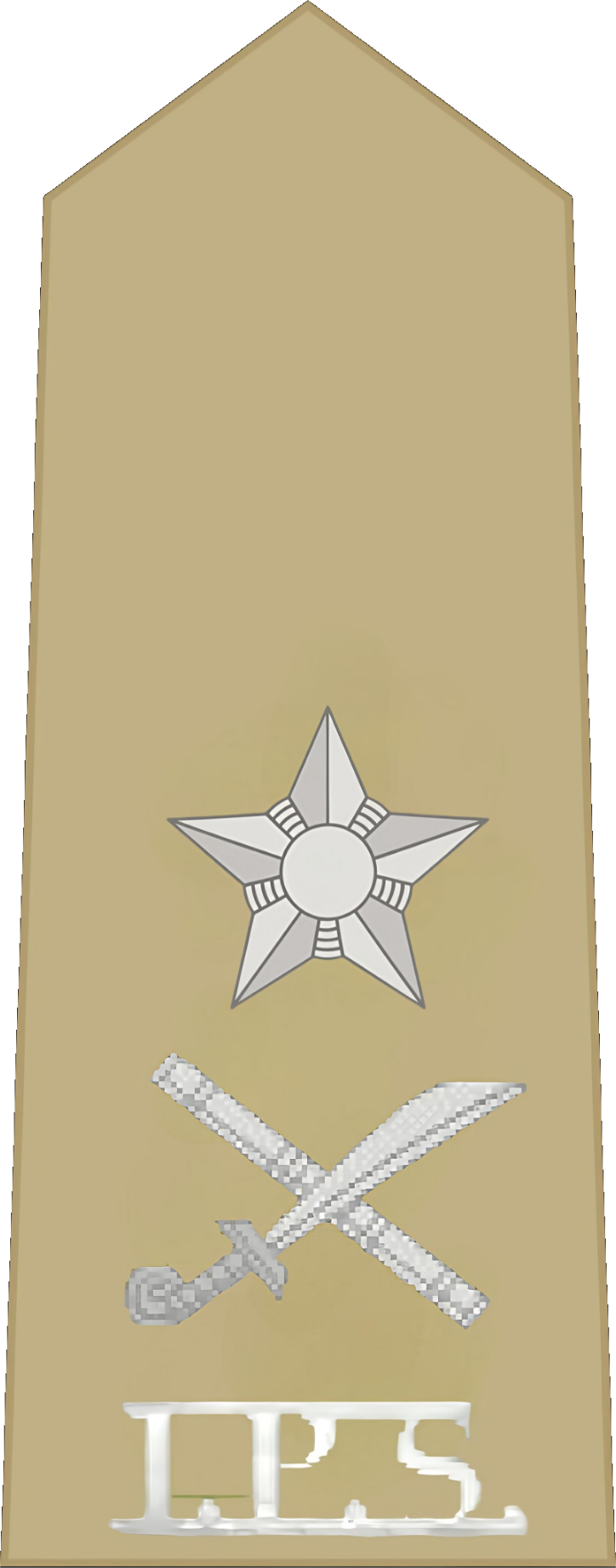
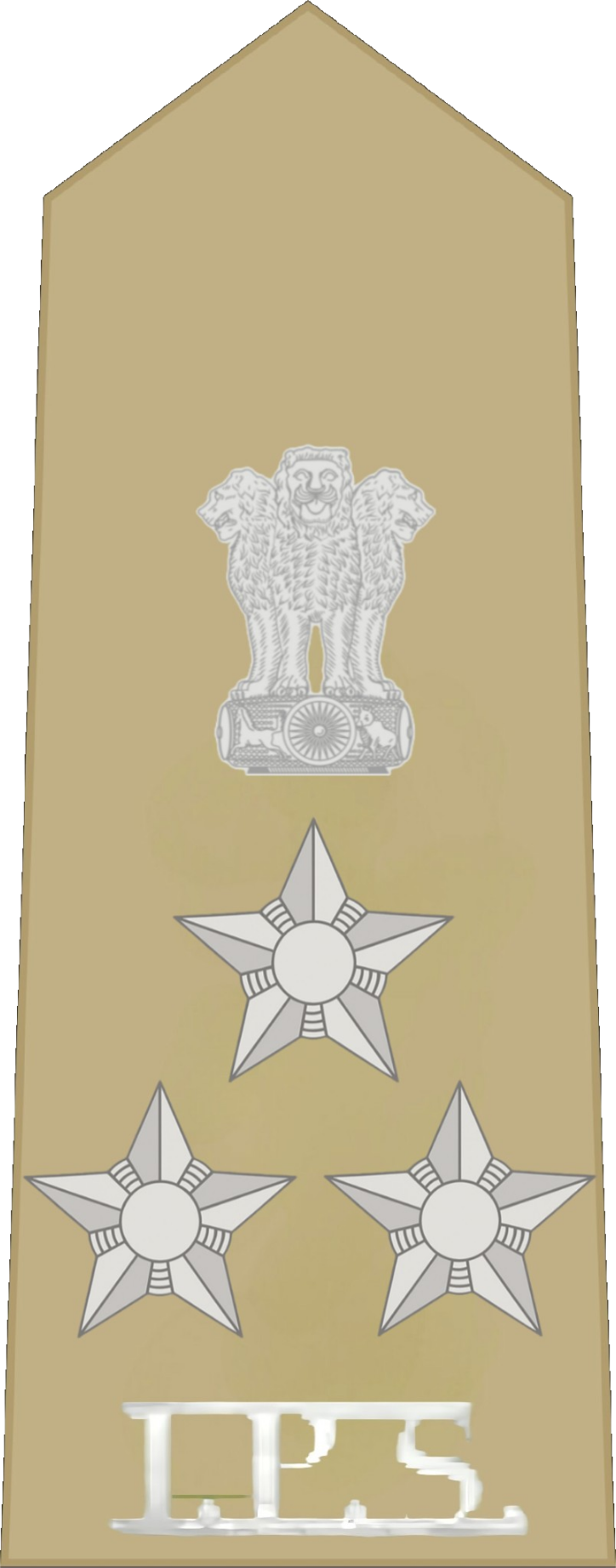
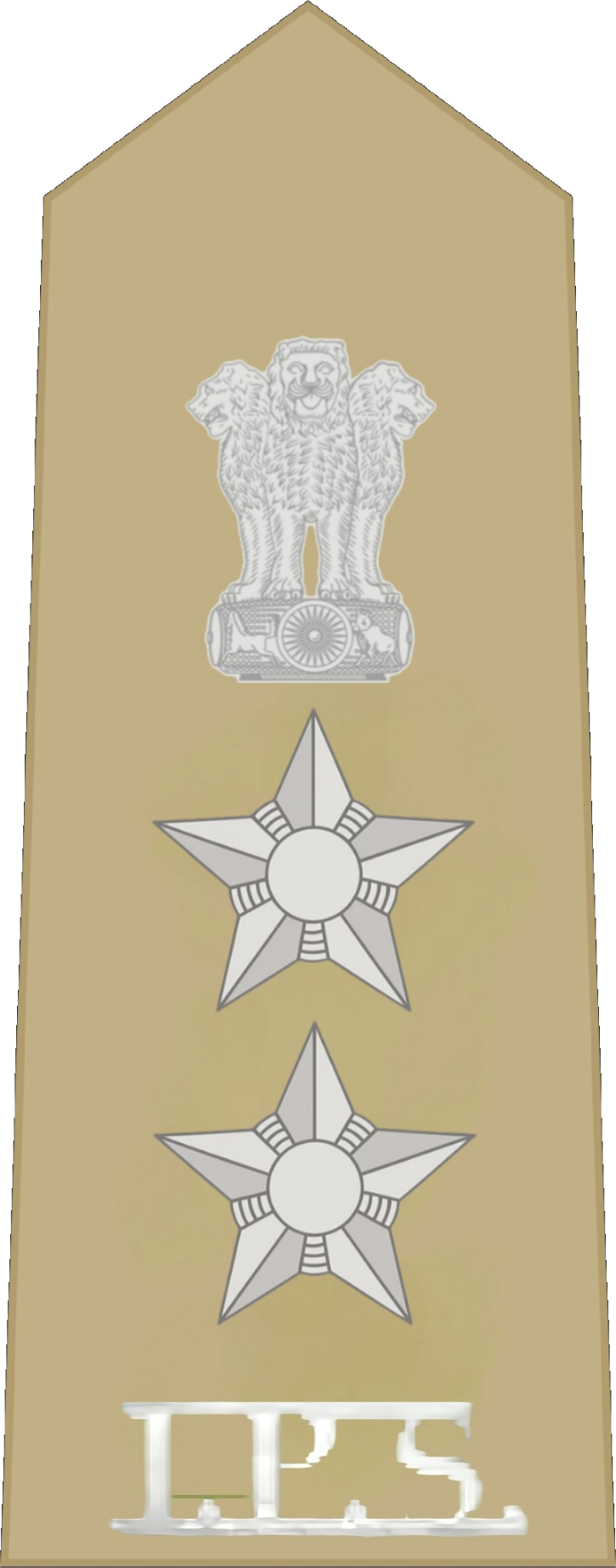
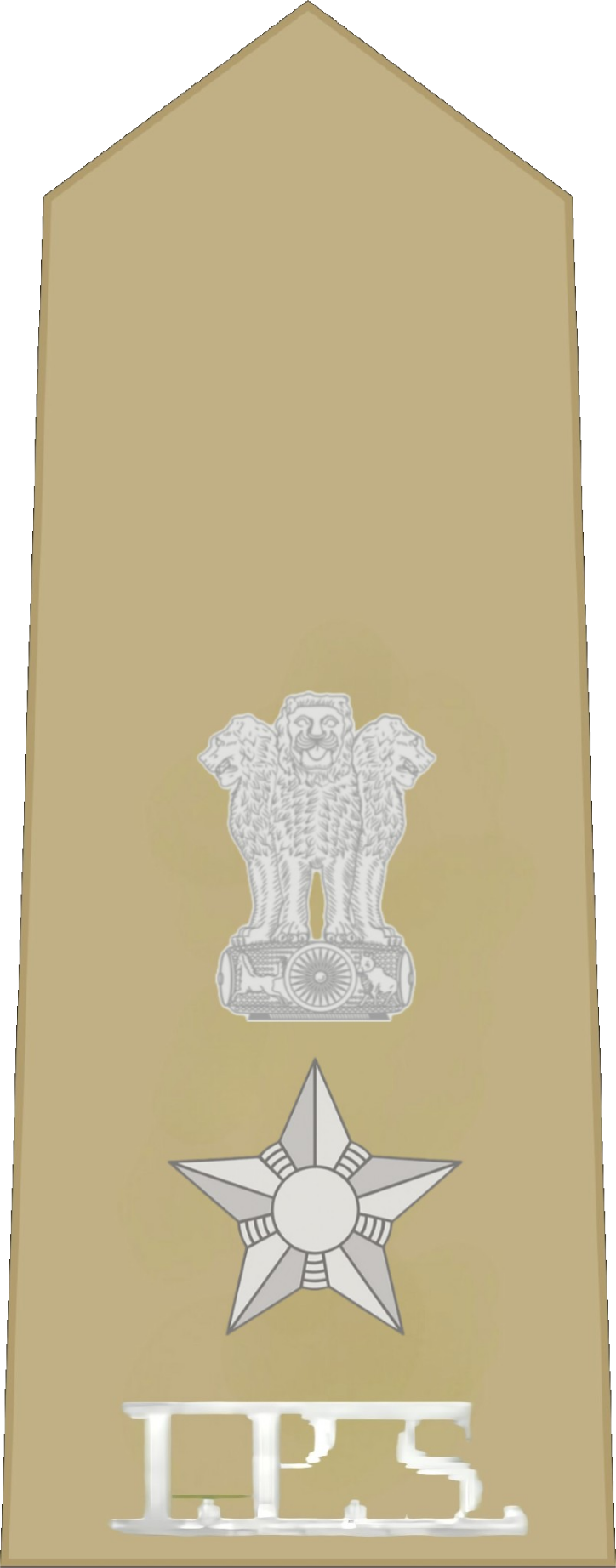
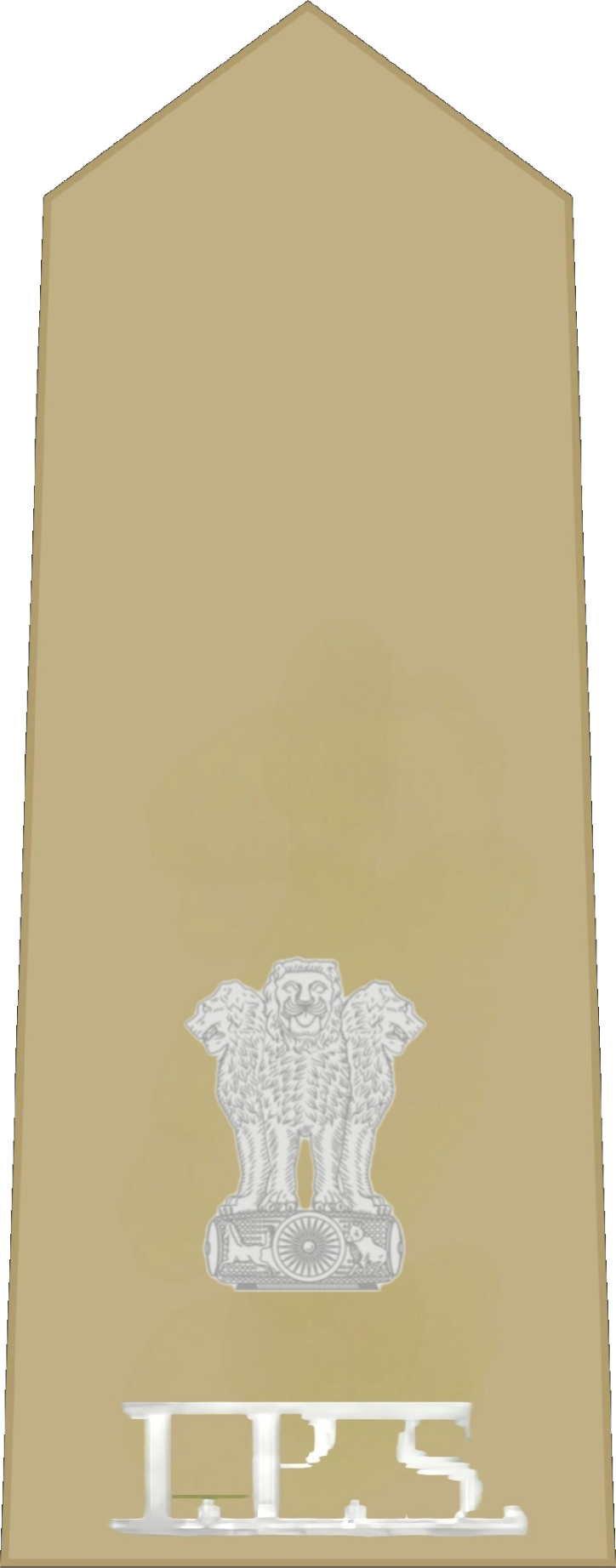
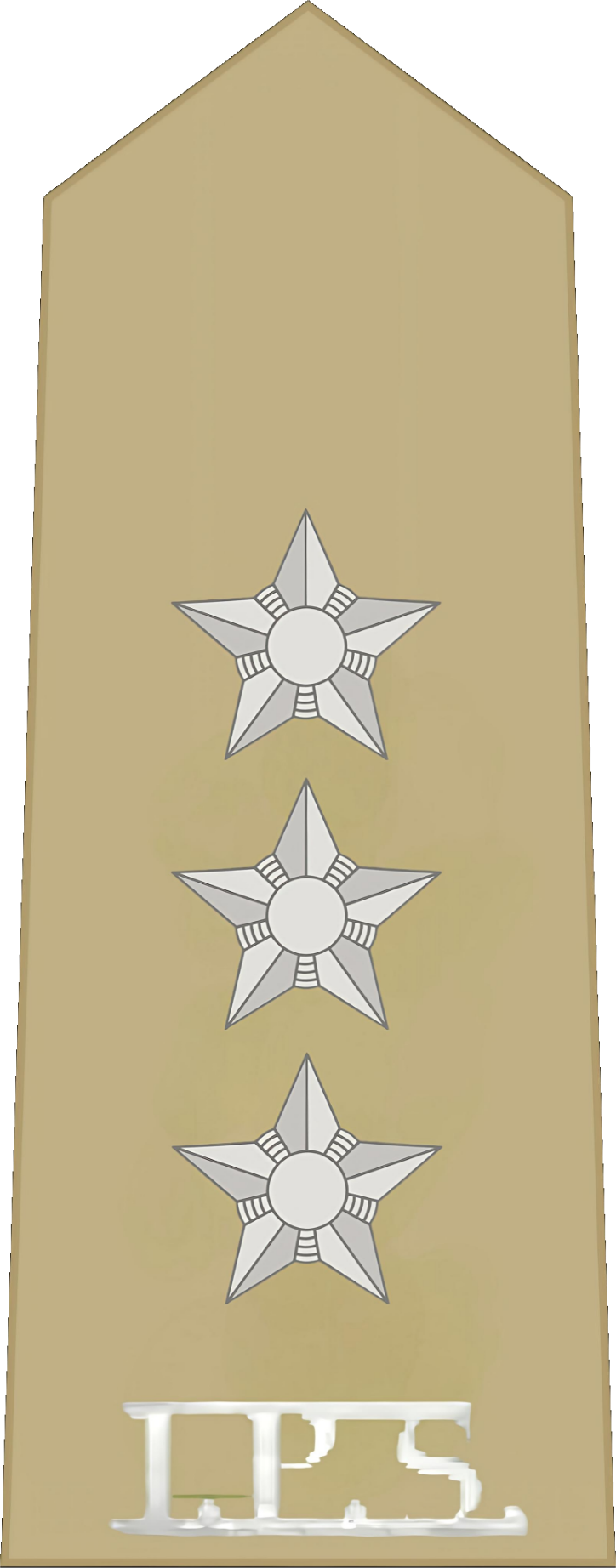
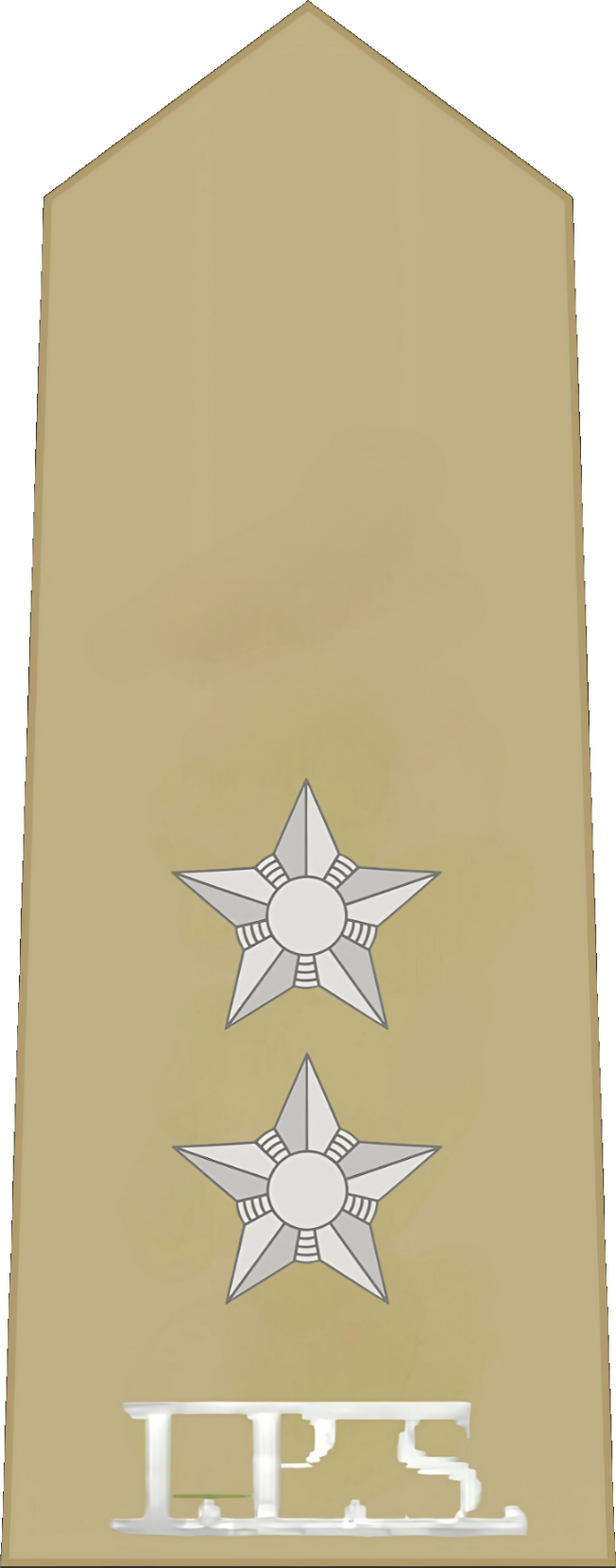
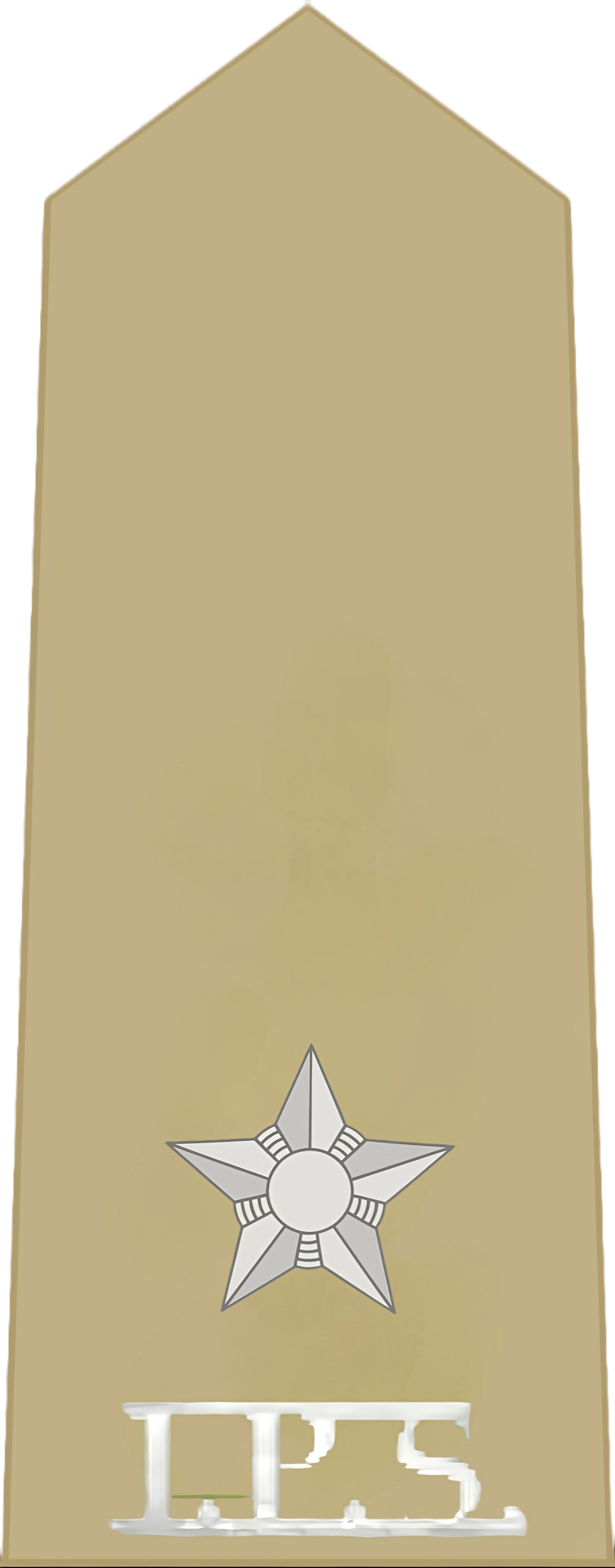
Rank
Director General of Police
Additional Director General of Police (Note: Rank insignia of DGP is similar to Additional DGP.)
Inspector General of Police
Deputy Inspector General of Police
Superintendent of Police (Selection Grade) (Note: The Senior Superintendent of Police (SSP) is a post, not a rank, typically held by an SP (selection grade or junior grade) in states like Uttar Pradesh, Jammu and Kashmir, and Punjab.)
Superintendent of Police
Additional superintendent of police
Assistant Superintendent of Police
Assistant superintendent of police (Probationary for two years)
Assistant Superintendent of Police (Probationary for one year)
Abbreviation
DGP
ADGP
IGP
DIGP
SP (SG)
SP
Addl.SP
ASP
ASP
ASP

- Note 1: The rank insignia of DGP, Spl.DGP, Addl.DGP is the same.
- Note 2: The equivalent rank to the ASP (Asst.SP) in State Police Services is the deputy superintendent of police (DSP/DySP).
- Note 3: The commissioner of police is a post typically held by DIG and above rank officers.

== Special Forces ==
=== Special Operation Group ===
The Special Operation Group (SOG) is an elite paramilitary unit specializing in neutralizing terrorists, insurgents and extremists. The force currently, is primarily being used to counter left-wing extremism.

=== Special Tactical Unit ===
The Special Tactical Unit (STU) is a dedicated urban warfare counter-terrorist force consisting of Special Operations Group (SOG) personnel who are trained alongside the National Security Guard (NSG). The force made Odisha, third state in the country, after Maharashtra and Andhra Pradesh, to have a dedicated force to counter terrorism in urban areas.

=== District Voluntary Force ===
The District Voluntary Force (DVF) is a special constabulary unit specializing in anti-Maoist operations.

=== Odisha Special Armed Police (OSAP) ===
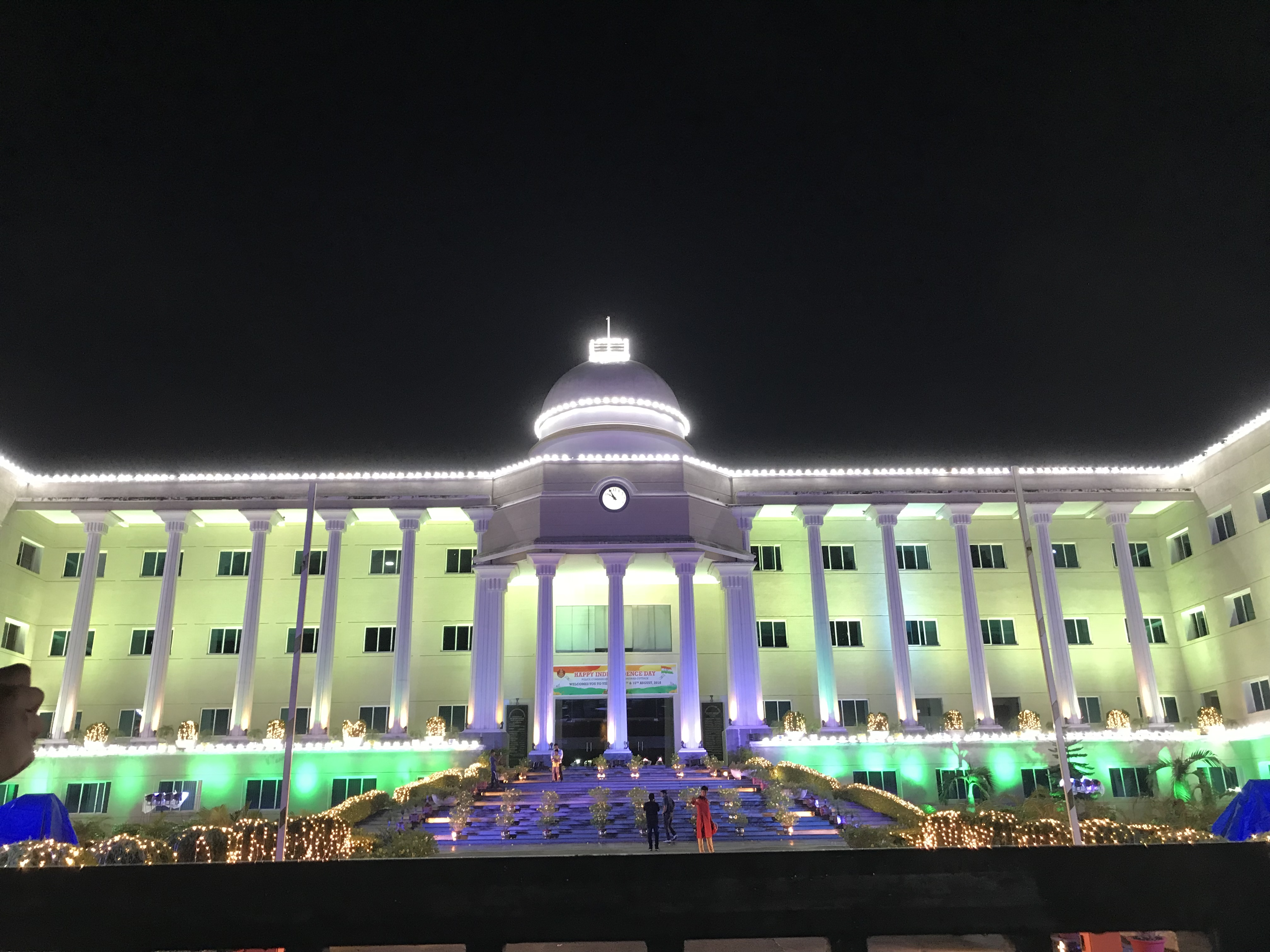
Bhubaneswar–Cuttack Police Commissionerate Headquarters, Bhubaneswar, Odisha

The Odisha Special Armed Police consists of 8 Odisha Special Armed Police Battalions, 6 Specialized Indian Reserved (IR) Battalions, 4 Social Security (SS) Battalions, 2 Specialized Indian Reserved (IR) Battalions and a Special Security Battalion, working under the Bhubaneswar–Cuttack Police Commissionerate.

The Orissa Military Police was formed under the Orissa Military Police Act VII (Government of Odisha) of 1946 which was formed on 1 March 1946. Till 1980, the Orissa Military Police was serving the state with its two battalions i.e. the Gurkhas and the Oriyas. After the Orissa Military Police (Amendment) Act 1980, the name “Orissa Military Police’’ was changed to “Odisha Special Armed Police (OSAP)”. There after, the department has achieved numerous remarkable feats advancing regularly with latest gadgets, arms and ammunition.

=== Odisha Industrial Security Force (OISF) ===
The Odisha Industrial security Force (OISF) is a security force which was constituted to protect public and private sector industrial undertakings in Odisha. The force was formed under the Odisha Industrial Security Force Act of the Government of Odisha in 2012.

=== Odisha Auxiliary Police Force (OAPF) ===
Government of Odisha sanctioned altogether 5600 posts of Special Police Officers (SPOs) keeping in mind of SC and ST's employment in 2008. Currently, the force has a sanctioned strength of 1521 personnel.

== Odisha Police Academies ==
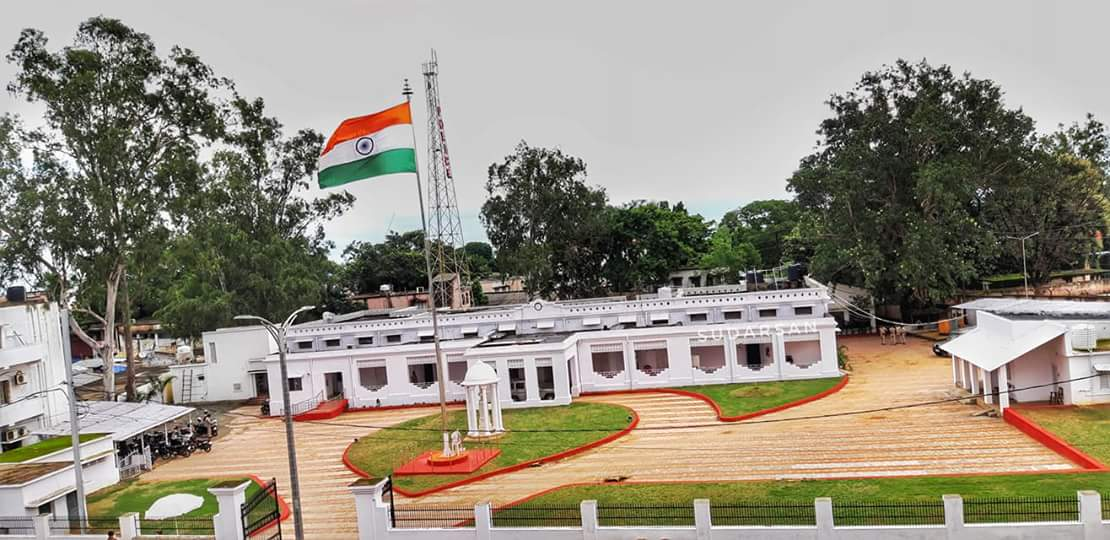
Superintendent of Police Office, Keonjhar, Odisha

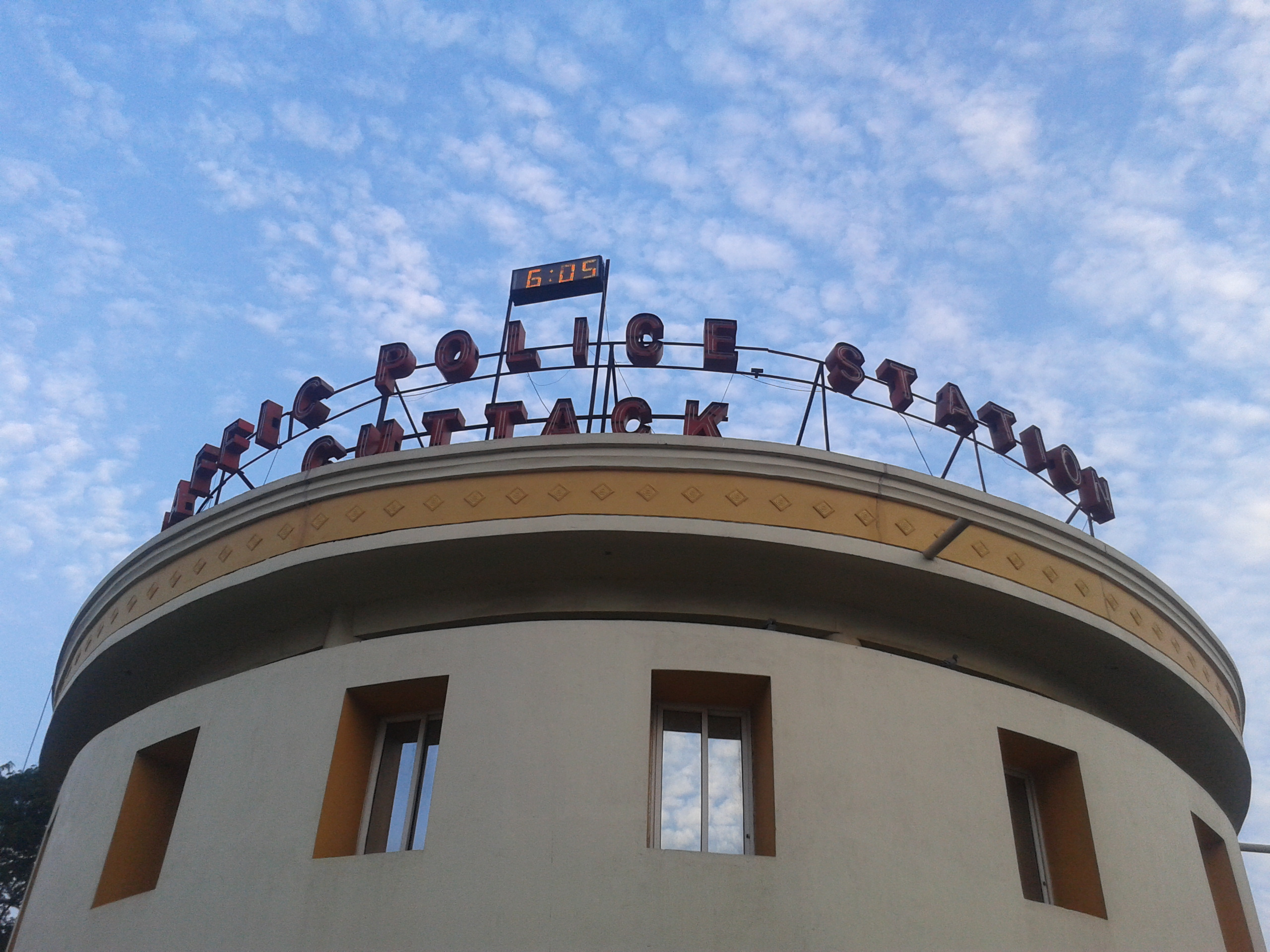
Traffic Police Station, Cuttack, Odisha

- Armed Police Training Centre, Jharsuguda
- Basic Training Institute, Burla
- Biju Patnaik State Police Academy, Bhubaneswar
- Police Training College, Angul
- Police Training Institute, Jajpur
- Police Training School, Nayagarh
- Range Level Police Training School (RPTS), Koraput
- S.O.G. Training Centre, Chandaka, Bhubaneswar
- Urban Police & Traffic Training Institute, Bhubaneswar

== Weapons and equipment ==
=== Arms ===
Name	Country of origin	Type
Pistol Auto 9mm 1A	India	Semi-automatic pistol
Glock 17	Austria	Semi-automatic pistol
Beretta PX4 Storm	Italy	Semi-automatic pistol
SAF Carbine 2A1s	India	Submachine gun
Uzi	Israel	Submachine gun
Heckler & Koch MP5	Germany	Submachine gun
Brügger & Thomet MP9	Switzerland	Submachine gun
INSAS rifle	India	Rifle
L1A1 SLR	India	Rifle
AK-47	Soviet Union	Rifle
AKM	Soviet Union	Rifle
AKMS	Soviet Union	Rifle
IMI Galil	Israel	Rifle
M4 carbine	United States	Rifle
.303 Lee–Enfield	United Kingdom	Rifle
Sig Sauer 556	Switzerland	Rifle

=== Communication ===
- Duplex sets
- Walkie-talkies
- VHF sets

=== Marine ===
- 5 Ton GRSE Series Fast Interceptor Boats (FIB)
- 12 Ton GRSE Series Fast Interceptor Boats (FIB)
- Inflatable Boats

=== Miscellaneous ===
- K9 Squad

== Honours ==
Awardee	Award	Decoration	Year	Event
Pramod Kumar Satapathy (Posthumous)	Ashoka Chakra		2009	Republic Day (India)
Debashish Sethy (Posthumous)	Shaurya Chakra		2021	Independence Day (India)
Sudhir Kumar Tudu (Posthumous)	Shaurya Chakra		2021	Independence Day (India)

== Awards ==
Award	Category	Year	Event	Organisation Conferring
SKOCH Award Gold	Dynamic Web Portal	2018	52nd SKOCH Summit	SKOCH Group
Special Jury Award	Community Policing	2018	FICCI Smart Policing Awards	Federation of Indian Chambers of Commerce & Industry
FICCI Smart Policing Award	Senior Citizens' Security in Bhubaneswar and Cuttack	2016	FICCI Smart Policing Awards	Federation of Indian Chambers of Commerce & Industry
FICCI Smart Policing Award	Enhancing Women Safety and Security in Bhubaneswar and Cuttack	2016	FICCI Smart Policing Awards	Federation of Indian Chambers of Commerce & Industry

Odisha Police received award from National Crime Records Bureau for best implementation of Information Technology in the country. Odisha Police has also been felicitated for having the second best police station in the country.

== Heads of Odisha Police Force ==
List of Inspectors General (IGP) and Directors General of Police (DGP) of Odisha
No.	Name	Service & Batch	Took office	Left office
1	J. E. Pearman	IP	25 November 1946	31 March 1948
2	C. M. Wright Neville	IP	1 April 1948	18 August 1951
3	B. Roy	IP	19 August 1951; 10 September 1953	26 July 1953; 10 October 1958
4	R. C. Das	IPS	11 October 1958	15 March 1960
5	J. C. Ghosh	IP	16 March 1960; 25 September 1967	28 March 1964; 13 November 1968
6	R. K. Padhi	IP	22 March 1967; 14 January 1968; 22 March 1969	24 June 1967; 28 February 1969; 19 January 1974
7	B. B. Mishra	IP	7 August 1969	22 January 1973
8	N. Chand	IPS	20 January 1974	15 August 1974
9	N. Swain	IPS	16 August 1974; 21 April 1980; 1 March 1982	18 May 1977; 28 February 1982; 31 July 1983
10	B. K. Roy	IPS	19 May 1977	10 July 1979
11	S. S. Padhi	IPS	10 July 1979; 31 July 1983; 31 August 1986	20 April 1980; 5 April 1985; 26 August 1987
12	B. K. Panigrahi	IPS	5 April 1985	31 August 1986
13	P. C. Ratho	IPS	26 August 1987; 3 July 1991	18 December 1989; 30 October 1992
14	S. Sinha	IPS	18 December 1989	22 May 1990
15	D. N. Singh	IPS	22 May 1990	31 January 1991
16	S. N. Mishra	IPS	31 January 1991	3 July 1991
17	S. C. Mishra	IPS	30 October 1992	18 January 1994
18	R. N. Mohapatra	IPS	18 January 1994	15 November 1995
19	A. B. Tripathy	IPS	16 November 1995	31 October 1997
20	B. B. Panda	IPS	30 November 1997; 12 November 1999	5 August 1999; 10 March 2000
21	D. K. Mohapatra	IPS	5 March 1999	12 October 1999
22	S. K. Chatterjee	IPS	10 March 2000	30 April 2001
23	K. D. Bajpai	IPS	30 April 2001	31 July 2001
24	N. C. Padhi	IPS	31 July 2001	31 July 2004
25	B. B. Mishra	IPS	31 July 2004	30 June 2005
26	Suchit Das	IPS	30 June 2005	1 September 2006
27	Amarananda Pattanayak	IPS	1 September 2006	31 October 2007
28	Gopal Chandra Nanda	IPS	1 November 2007	30 September 2008
29	Manmohan Praharaj	IPS	30 September 2008	4 July 2012
30	Prakash Mishra	IPS (1977)	6 July 2012	6 July 2014
31	Sanjiv Marik	IPS (1981)	6 July 2014	7 November 2015
32	Kunwar Brajesh Singh	IPS (1985)	7 November 2015	31 August 2017
33	Rajendra Prasad Sharma	IPS (1986)	31 August 2017	8 August 2019
34	Bijay Kumar Sharma	IPS (1986)	8 August 2019	20 November 2019
35	Abhay	IPS (1986)	20 November 2019	31 December 2021
36	Sunil Kumar Bansal	IPS (1987)	1 January 2022	31 December 2023
37	Arun Kumar Sarangi (Acting)	IPS (1990)	1 January 2024	15 August 2024
38	Yogesh Bahadur Khurania	IPS (1990)	16 August 2024	16 August 2026
39	Vinaytosh Mishra (Acting)	IPS (1993)	16 August 2026	Incumbent

== Controversies ==
Odisha Police has been accused of failure to act on intelligence reports. It has also drawn flak for delay in police recruitment process. Several senior police officers have been convicted of corruption.

== See also ==
- State Armed Police Forces
- Law enforcement in India
