= Bhubaneswar–Cuttack Police Commissionerate =

Police Commissionerate of Orissa

Bhubaneswar–Kataka Police Commissionerate ଭୁବନେଶ୍ଵର-କଟକ ପୋଲିସ କମିସନରେଟ୍
- Motto: We Care-We Dare ଆମେ ଯତ୍ନବାନ-ଆମେ ସାହସୀ

Agency overview
- Formed: 1 January 2008
- Employees: ➡Commissioner of Police (CP) ➡Additional Commissioner of Police (Addl. CP) ➡Deputy Commissioner of Police (DCP) ➡Assistant Commissioner of Police (ACP) ➡Additional Deputy Commissioner of Police (Addl. DCP) ➡Inspector (Inspr) ➡Sub-Inspector (SI) ➡ Assistant Sub-Inspector (ASI)

Jurisdictional structure
- Operations jurisdiction: Bhubaneswar and Kataka, India
- Population: 14 Lakh
- Governing body: Government of Odisha
- General nature: Local civilian police

Operational structure
- Headquarters: Bhubaneswar, Odisha, India
- Agency executives: Shri S. Dev Datta Singh, IPS, Commissioner of Police; Shri Narasingha Bhol, IPS, Additional Commissioner of Police

Facilities
- Stations: 43

Website
- http://www.bhubaneswarcuttackpolice.gov.in/

Bhubaneswar–Kataka Police Commissionerate (Odia: ଭୁବନେଶ୍ଵର-କଟକ ପୋଲିସ କମିଶନରେଟ), established in 2008, is a city police force with primary responsibilities in law enforcement and investigation within the metropolitan area of Bhubaneswar-Kataka (respectively the capital and the former capital of the Indian state of Odisha). It was formed under the Odisha Urban Police Act, 2003 by a gazette notification which came into effect on 1 January 2008. It has 60 police stations under its jurisdiction. Shri S. Dev Datta Singh, IPS is currently the Commissioner of the Bhubaneswar–Kataka Police Commissionerate.

== Structure and jurisdiction ==
The Police Commissionerate is situated at Bhubaneswar, and is divided into two urban police districts- Bhubaneswar and Kataka. The Commissionerate is responsible for law enforcement over the urban agglomeration of Bhubaneswar and Kataka with the help of 43 police stations under it. The Commissionerate is headed by the Commissioner of Police, who is an Indian Police Service officer in the rank of Inspector-General of Police (IGP). The Commissioner is assisted by two ACP's. There are six Deputy Commissioners of Police (D.C.P), Law Officer, Public Relation Officer, Accounts Officer and 31 Additional Deputy Commissioner of Police, 68 Inspector/ Subedars and a large number of other officers & ministerial staffs to assist the commissioner. The police stations are headed by an Inspector.

=== Police stations ===
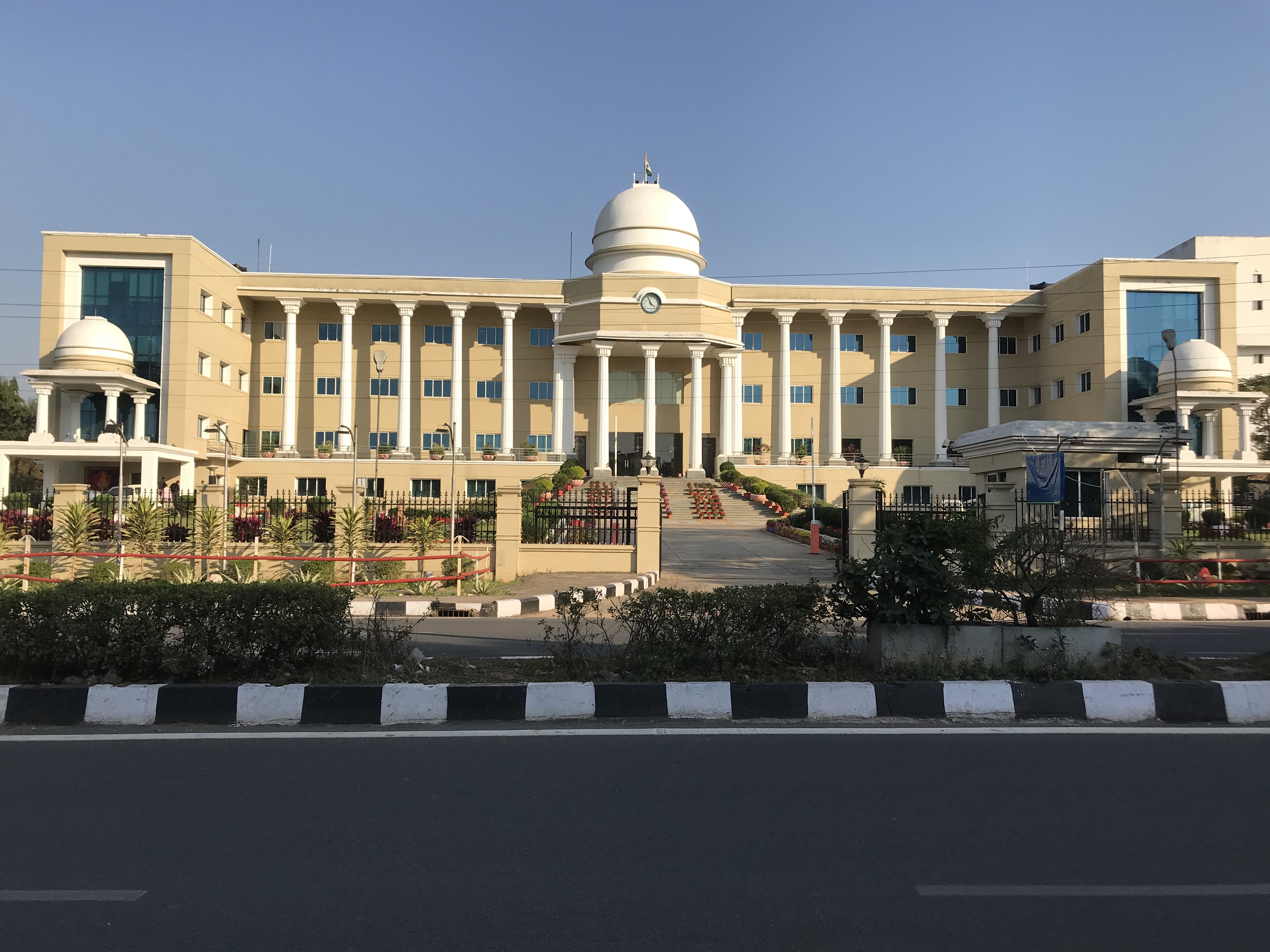
Bhubaneswar–Kataka Commissionerate Police HQ in Bhubaneswar

==== Bhubaneswar division ====
- Capital
- Kharvelnagar
- Saheed Nagar
- Nayapalli
- Khandagiri
- Mancheswar
- Chandrasekharpur
- ShreeLingaraj
- Badagada
- Airfield
- Laxmisagar
- Jatni
- Mahila Police Station, Rajpath
- Spl. Energy, Power House Square
- Chandaka
- Balianta
- Balipatna
- Infocity
- Nandankanan
- Tamando
- Dhauli
- Traffic Police Station, A.G Square
- Bharatpur

==== Kataka division ====
- Cantonment
- Bidanasi
- Markatnagar
- Lalbag
- Purighat
- Madhupatna
- Chauliaganj
- Malgodown
- Mangalabag
- Daraghabazar
- Mahila
- Choudwar
- Jagatpur
- Spl. Energy
- Sadar
- Baranga
- Badambadi
- Kandarpur
- CDA Phase-II
- Traffic
- Traffic NH Phulnakhara
