= Pramod Kumar Satapathy =

Indian Police Officer

Assistant Commandant Pramod Kumar Satapathy AC
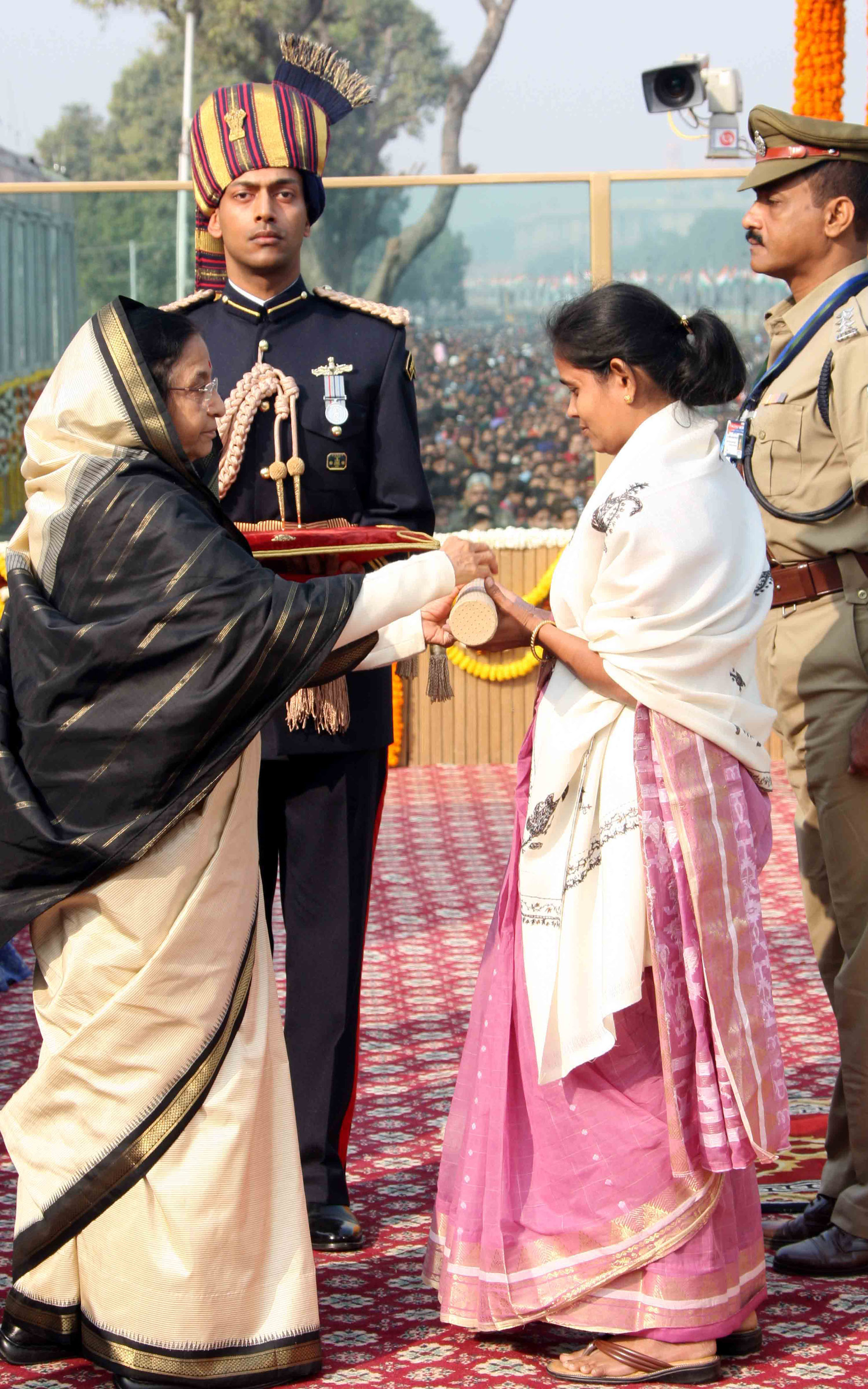
- Smt. Amita Satpathy receiving Ashoka Chakra awarded to her husband Shri Pramod Kumar Satpathy (Posthumous) from the President, Smt. Pratibha Devisingh Patil, during the 60th Republic Day Parade-2009, in New Delhi
- Born: Odisha, India
- Died: 15 February 2008; Nayagarh, Odisha, India
- Spouse: Amita Satpathy
- Police career
- Allegiance: India
- Branch: Odisha Police
- Rank: Assistant Commandant
- Awards: Ashoka Chakra

Pramod Kumar Satapathy, AC was the Assistant Commandant of the Special Operation Group of Odisha Special Armed Police, which comes under India's Odisha Police who was awarded India's highest peace time gallantry award Ashoka Chakra.

On the night of 15 February 2008, about 500 armed naxalites attacked the police at various locations in and around Bhubaneshwar, Odisha, India. On hearing this news, Shri Satapathy along with just 20 available police personnel reached inside the jungle in Nayagarh and launched an assault on the hiding militants. In the ensuing encounter, Shri Satapathy bravely led the operations but ultimately got killed in action.

== Ashoka Chakra awardee ==
For this act of courage, the President of India posthumously awarded him with the Ashok Chakra on Republic Day, 2009.

The official citation for the Ashoka Chakra Award reads:

ASSISTANT COMMANDANT SHRI PRAMOD KUMAR SATAPATHY TRAINING-IN-CHARGE OF THE SPECIAL OPERATION GROUP ORISSA STATE ARMED POLICE (POSTHUMOUS)

In the night of 15th February 2008 about 500 heavily armed naxalites carried out simultaneous attacks on police at various locations in and around Bhubaneswar looting many weapons and killing several police personnel. Thereafter, they hid in nearby jungles.

Assistant Commandant Shri Pramod Kumar Satapathy of the Special Operation Group along with a mere 20 police personnel reached the elevated position taken by the naxalites inside the jungle and immediately mounted an assault on them. The naxalites retaliated with heavy fire on the police team and in a fierce encounter lasting for about two hours. Shri Satapathy led the operations with exemplary courage before making the supreme sacrifice.

Shri Pramod Kumar Satapathy displayed highest degree of bravery and dedication to duty in the fight against naxalites.
