= District Voluntary Force =

- Abbreviation: DVF

Agency overview
- Formed: 2009
- Employees: 500

Jurisdictional structure
- Operations jurisdiction: Odisha, India
- General nature: Local civilian police

Operational structure
- Headquarters: Bhubaneswar, Odisha, India
- Parent agency: Odisha Police
- Data for organisation as at December 2011

District Voluntary Force (DVF) is a special constabulary unit of the Odisha Police. They are primarily used in anti-Maoist operations. It was formed in 2009.

== Organisation ==
Odisha has 500 personnel under the DVF. They do not wear special lapels or badges. 40% are recruited from former Special Operation Group (SOG) agents, as they retire after 35; and rest from the local police who speak the local dialects and know the terrain. They work in groups of 8–10. Some of them gather information and other carry out operations. They don't require the approval of Superintendent of Police for operations, unlike the SOG. However, for bigger operations, SOG is sent to avoid casualties, as DVF lacks the training. DVF agents have 30% higher salary than the local police.

In January 2011, the state government announced that they would increase the number of DVF personnel. The number of district with DVF units would be increased from 11 to 17.

== Notable operations and incidents ==
In early March 2014, a DVF team killed two Maoist in Koraput district. In mid-May 2014, Purna Huluka (alias Khatru) was shot dead by a DVF team in Koraput district. He had a bounty of ₹100,000 on his head.

In mid-September 2014, a DVF team killed a wanted Maoist leader, Erra Madkami (alias Sundhi Dalei), in Malkangiri district. Madkami had a ₹400,000 bounty on his head. In late December 2014, acting on a tip-off a joint team of DVF and SOG raided a Maoist hideout and captured two Maoists in Sambalpur district.

== See also ==
- Special Operation Group (Odisha) (Odisha Police)
- Special Tactical Unit (Odisha Police)
