= Dina Nagar =

Dinanagar
- City
- City Location in Punjab, India
- Coordinates: 32.15°N 75.4667°E
- Country: India
- State: Punjab
- District: Gurdaspur
- Established: 1730
- Founder: Adina Beg

Area
  - Total: 37.2 km^{2} (14.36 sq mi)

Population (2014)
  - Total: 26,394
  - Density: 709.7/km^{2} (1,838/sq mi)
- Demonym: Dinanagari

Languages
  - Official: Punjabi
- Time zone: UTC+5:30 (IST)
- PIN: 143531
- Vehicle registration: PB 99

Dinanagar is a city and a municipal council in Gurdaspur district in the Majha region of the state of Punjab, India. It takes its name after Adina Beg, who served as the subahdar of Punjab for the Mughals and Marathas. He built up his residence and exercised his government mainly from this city, whilst he was serving as the governor of the nearby town of Behrampur. During the rule of the Punjabi Sikh Empire, it was the favourite summer resort of Maharaja Ranjit Singh, who held durbar there during summer, effectively making the city his summer capital.

== History ==
Dinanagar city is situated about 14 km North-East of Gurdaspur. It was founded by Adina Beg 1730, on the bank of Hasli or Shah Nahar as his residence and cantonment. He seems to have exercised his government from this city.

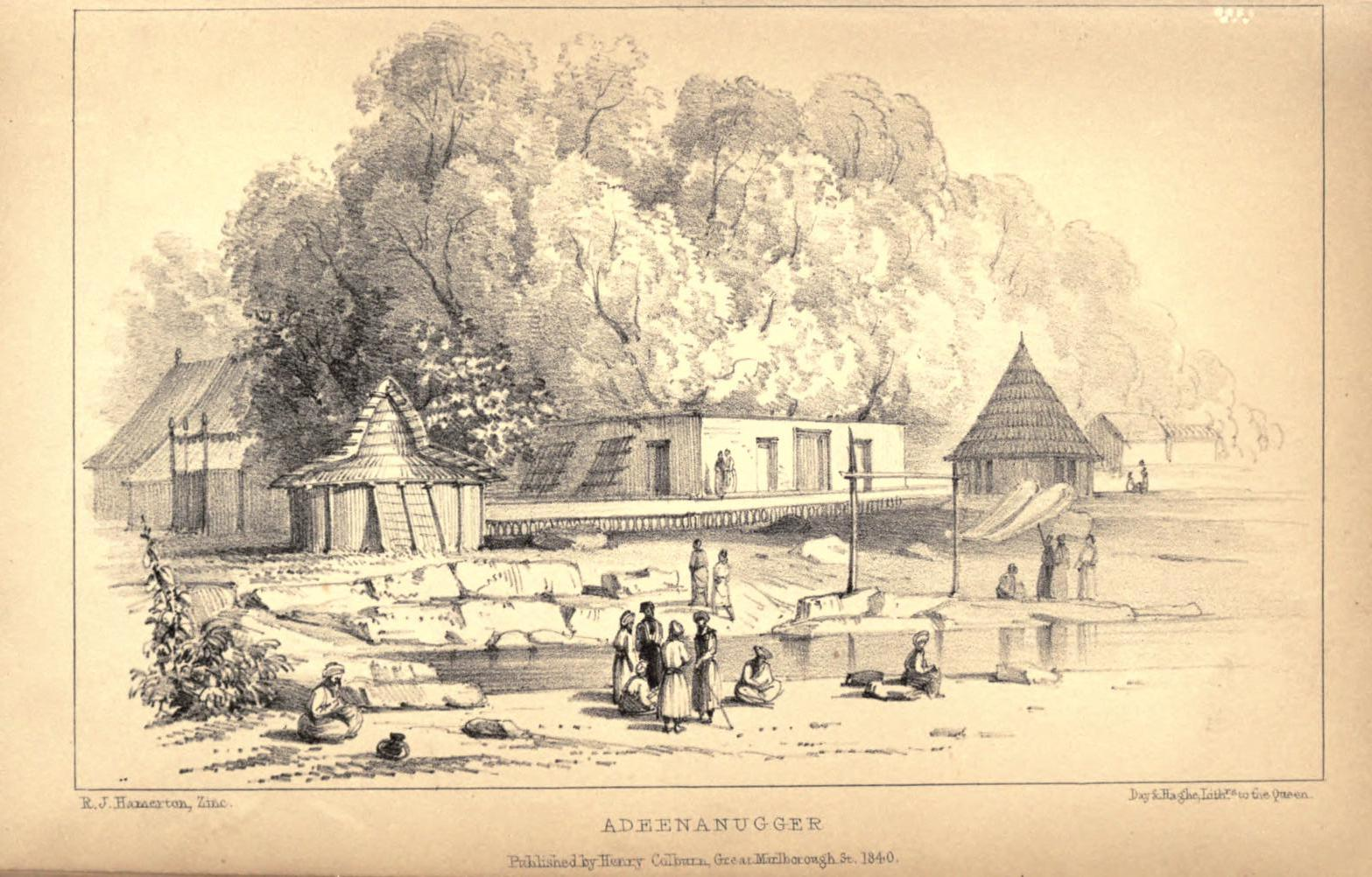
Lithograph titled 'Adeenanugger' (present-day Dina Nagar, Panjab), from 'The Court and Camp of Runjeet Sing' by William Godolphin Osborne, ca.1840.

Dinanagar was a favourite summer resort of Maharaja Ranjit Singh. It was one center where Singh usually held his Durbar during the summer. It was Singh's summer capital. He spent the two months of May and June every year at Dinanagar. It was here that in May 1838 he received the Macnaghten mission which negotiated the proposed alliance for placing Shah Shujah Durrani on the throne of Kabul.

After the annexation of the Punjab as British territory in March 1849, a new district of Adinanagar was constituted with Dinanagar as its headquarters. Gurdaspur Tehsil, a greater portion of Batala Tehsil and 181 villages of Pathankot Tehsil were included in the Adinanagar district. On April 28 James Abbott, who was involved in Punjab boundary work, received instructions to meet Major Lawrence's agent in the town, he then spent the 29th and 30th of April in the town before returning to Pathankot. 1846-1849. In July 1849 the civil and Military escorts were transferred to Batala as Dinanagar was thought unhealthy and in 1852 it became part of Gurdaspur district. The Rowlatt ACT passed in March 1919 invested the Government with extraordinary powers to suppress any kind of political agitation. A complete hartal was observed in Dinanagar along with Gurdaspur, Pathankot and Batala.

In 1920, the non-cooperation movement was started by Mahatma Gandhi due to alliance with Khilafat leader Jallianwala Bagh massacre and Rowllat Act. The people all over the country responded to the call of Gandhi. The Government made every effort to stop the movement and a large number of persons courted imprisonment. A durbar was held at Dinanagar to discuss the situation created by Gandhi by H. Harcourt, the Deputy Commissioner.

Swami Sawtantra Nand founded Dayanand Math in 1938 – an institution that became a center of learning and Ayurveda. In the course of time, A Dina Nagar has been known for its Loi, Shawl, and wood industries. A number of conduit pipe manufacturing units have been set up hereafter in 1947. Dinanagar is spread over 14.36 km^{2}.

=== 2015 attack ===
The 2015 Gurdaspur attack by Pakistani terrorists on the police station in Dinanagar resulted in 10 deaths (including the 3 attackers), and 18 injured. Killed were two civilians, Superintendent of Police (Detective) Baljit Singh, two home guards and two policemen.

== Geography ==
=== Location ===
Dinanagar is the northernmost city of Punjab state. It falls in the Jalandhar division and is sandwiched between the Ravi and Beas Rivers. The town shares common boundaries with Pathankot district in the north, Beas River in the north-east, Hoshiarpur district in the south-east, Kapurthala district in the south, Amritsar district in the south west and Pakistan in the north-west.

=== Topography ===
The landscape of the city has varied topography comprising undulating plan, the flood plains of the Ravi and the Beas and the upland plain. It is traversed by a number of chaos and has an undulating topography. The flood plains of the Ravi and the Beas are separated from the upland plain by sharp river cut bluffs. They are low lying, with slightly uneven topography. Sand dominates in the soil structure of the flood plains, but it diminishes in both quantity and coarseness in the upland plain. The upland plain covers a large part of the city particularly.

=== Climate ===
There are mainly two seasons, i.e. summer and winter. The summer season falls between the months of April to July and the winter November to March. In summer season the temperature touches 44 °C or even higher. June is the hottest month and January is the coldest one. Mostly the rain falls in the month of July. The winter rains are experienced during January and February. Dust storms occurs in the month of May and June.

=== Rainfall ===
The south-west monsoon generally arrives in the last week of June and continue up to the second week of September. 70% of the rainfall occurs during this period. Annual precipitation Is more than 1000mm. Heavy rain occur in monsoon season. City is Near the shivalik, so receives good showers during winter which are generally persistent from West. Dense fog is not uncommon which continues for days.

=== Ecology ===
The changes in ecology system are inevitable, consequences of development process. The denudation of forests due to increasing population, urbanization industrialization have accelerated the process of environmental degradation in the city. Therefore, preservation of the ecology is one of the most important goals of the city planning. The vegetation varies in the town depending on the soil, topography and elevation. In the Plain, large scale of afforestation has been undertaken by the forest department. Where water facilities are available, Shisham, mulberry, eucalyptus and poplar are being planted. Besides mango and mulberry, other fruit trees cultivated in the town include orange, Kinnow Lemon tree etc.

=== Hydrology ===
The ground water in this region is suitable for irrigation and domestic uses. The sub soil water depth ranges from 5 to 8 meters in most part of the city. Due to 'Dhusi bandh'(Embankment)and stepped floods the water table has gone very low.

=== Soils ===
The soils are loamy with a clay content below 10 percent. They contain small quantities of lime but the magnesia content is high. They are well supplied in potash and phosphoric acid but the quantities available are low. The agriculture is dependent to a large extent on the nature of its soils which in turn, is influenced materially by climatic factors. The cultivable waste land is fallow or covered with bushes or jungle which may not be put to any use. Lands under that ching grass bamboo, bushes, tree crops etc. which are not included under forests have been considered as cultivable waste. As for example, all growing lands which are permanent pastures, meadows, grazing lands within the forests etc.

=== Minerals ===
The foundry sand is found from Dharamkot near Batala. The deposits are located 6.5 km west of Batala. The sand gives a yellowish tinge on the surface but is reddish brown at about 1 meter depth. The salt occurs in the village Pandori near Dinanagar. It is a source of potassium nitrate which can be used for making crackers and gunpowder, in match and sugar industry and as fertilizer.

== Demographics ==
As of 2001 India census, Dina Nagar had a population of 21,494. Males constitute 52% of the population and females 48%. Dina Nagar has an average literacy rate of 75%, higher than the national average of 59.5%: male literacy is 78% and, female literacy is 69%. In Dina Nagar, 11% of the population is under 6 years of age.

The table below shows the population of different religious groups in Dina Nagar city and their gender ratio, as of 2011 census.

Population by religious groups in Dina Nagar city, 2011 census
Religion	Total	Female	Male	Gender ratio
Hindu	20,702	9,866	10,836	910
Sikh	2,585	1,243	1,342	926
Christian	493	245	248	987
Muslim	87	40	47	851
Buddhist	5	3	2	1500
Other religions	6	2	4	500
Not stated	98	53	45	1177
Total	23,976	11,452	12,524	914

== Politics ==
The city is part of the Dina Nagar Assembly Constituency.

== Transport ==
=== Rail ===
Dinanagar's railway station is connected with the nearest station Pathankot and Gurdaspur. From Dinanagar there are many trains to Pathankot and Amritsar, and two main trains: Jammu Tawi Express (Jammu to Tata Nagar) and Pathankot-Delhi Express.

=== Road ===
National Highway 15 (NH 15) connects Kandla in Gujarat with Dinanagar in Punjab. A new by-pass for heavy traffic is also made to reduce the heavy traffic transportation with in and through the town.

== Colleges ==
- Swami Sarvanand College of Engineering & Technology
- Swami Sarvanand College of Management & Technology
- Swami Sarvanand College for B.Ed
- Shanti Devi Arya Mahila College
- SSM College
- Regional College Dinanagar

== CBSE School ==
- Shamrock International School
- Greenland Public School
- Gobind Public School
- Lotus International School
- Sumitra Devi Arya sr. sec. School
- Kids care International school

== PSEB Schools ==
- Vivekanand Senior Secondary School
- Arya Senior Secondary School
- SSDAV Senior Secondary School
- Prince Modern High School
- Government Model Senior Secondary School Boys
- Government Girls Senior Secondary School
- SS Modern Sr. Sec. School Jhangi
- Sarvhitkari Vidya Mandir
- S D Modern high school
- ॐShivaji Public School

== ICSE School ==
- Little Flower Convent School
- ASR school
- study centre of health education research council of India.
- Regional College Dinanagar
