= Kerala Thunderbolts =

Indian police unit

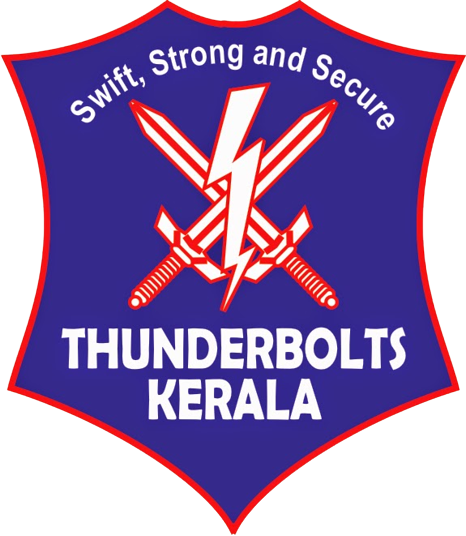
- Insignia of Kerala Thunderbolts
- Active: 2012 – present
- Country: India
- Agency: Kerala Police
- Type: Police tactical unit
- Role: Air assault Anti-irregular military Bodyguard; Bomb disposal Clandestine operation Close-quarters battle Counterinsurgency; Counterterrorism; Crowd control Direct action Emergency management Force protection Hostage rescue Jungle warfare Law enforcement Long-range penetration Manhunt; Mountain warfare Parachuting; Patrolling; Raiding; Riot control Reconnaissance; Search and rescue Special operations Special reconnaissance Tracking; Urban warfare
- Operations jurisdiction: Kerala
- Part of: India Reserve Battalion (IRBn)
- Headquarters: Thrissur
- Motto: Swift, Strong and Secure

Structure
- Officers: 200
- Squads: Avengers (Urban Commandos); Scorpions (Regular Wing)

Commanders
- Current commander: Superintendent of Police (Operations)

Notables
- Anniversaries: 24 August

Kerala Thunderbolts is a police tactical unit of the Kerala Police under the India Reserve Battalion, set up in accordance with the Indian central government's directions post the 2008 Mumbai attacks.

The commando force has been created to carry out anti-irregular military, apprehension of armed and dangerous criminals, counterinsurgency in Kerala, counter possible terror strikes, emergency management for search and rescue of disaster victims, executive protection, high-risk tactical law enforcement situations, hostage rescue, operating in difficult to access terrain especially in mountainous forest areas, long-range penetration, providing security in areas at risk of attack or terrorism in Kerala, support crowd control and riot control, and other tactical special operations.

The force modeled on the Special Protection Group and National Security Guard are trained to engage in air, water and land attacks.

== Operations ==
A Thunderbolt team carried out a combing operation in the Malappuram district following reports of sighting of Maoist insurgents in February, 2013. In March 2013, a 30-member Thunderbolt team was involved in a counterinsurgency combing operation in search of suspected Maoist insurgents in Kannur district in Kerala. On 6 December 2014, A gunfight broke out in a forest in Kerala's hilly Wayanad district between the Thunderbolt unit and the left-wing rebels (Maoist). It was the first direct encounter between police and Maoists in the history of Kerala and no casualties were reported.

== Selection and training ==
The Commando police force consists of 2 companies of 160 personnel, who have been recruited after undergoing 2 years of rigorous and specialized training at various institutions around the country including Army's Counter Insurgency and Jungle Warfare School, Mizoram. Ex-Chief minister Oommen Chandy, announced the approval of the Central Government for raising a second battalion of 40 more personnel, in the wake of increased terrorist activity across India. Thunderbolts commandos are being trained at Special Operations Group, an elite commando police force of the Kerala Police.

The recruits, in the 18–21 age group, were selected after going through the Three Star Physical Efficiency Test and Endurance test, as specified by the Kerala Public Service Commission. The second stage training was completed at Commando School, Chennai, National Disaster Management School, Coimbatore, Counter insurgency and Anti Terrorism School, Silchar, National Adventure School, Munnar, Underwater Operation and Diving school, Kochi and Airborne Operation Air force School, New Delhi.

== Deployment ==
The commandos are known as "Thunderbolts" and are mostly used to battle Left Wing Extremism. They are deployed in various maoist insurgency affected districts in Kerala. Commandos are also stationed in major cities of Kozhikode, Kochi, and Thiruvananthapuram as "Avengers-The Urban Commandos," which are used in apprehension of armed and dangerous criminals, emergency scenarios like VIPs abductions or obstruction, hostage crisis, prison riot (if necessary), protection of senior executives of government agencies at risk of harm, providing security in areas at risk of attack or terrorism, and urban terrorism and insurgencies. A third squad of commandos is tasked with protecting the chief minister of Kerala in the meantime.

== See also ==
- Nilambur incident
