= Police forces of the states and union territories of India =

State and Union Territory Police Forces of India

Jurisdictional structure
- Operations jurisdiction: India
- Primary governing body: State / Union Territory Government of the respective States and Union Territories of India
- Secondary governing body: Government of India
- Constituting instrument: Police Act, 1861
- General nature: Civilian police

Operational structure
- Agency executive: Director general of police, (Head of the police department)
- Parent agency: Department of Home of the Respective States and Union Territories of India.

In India, the police forces of the states and union territories are responsible for law enforcement in the states and union territories. Police and Public Order are State subjects under the Seventh Schedule to the Constitution of India.

The following sections list the State Police forces and Union Territory Police forces in India, along with their specialised units, presented in tabular form.

== History ==
The Police Act of 1861 established the principles of organization for police forces in India and, with minor modifications, continues in effect. Although state police forces are separate and may differ in quality of equipment and resources, their patterns of organization and operation are similar.

== Organisation ==
=== State Police ===
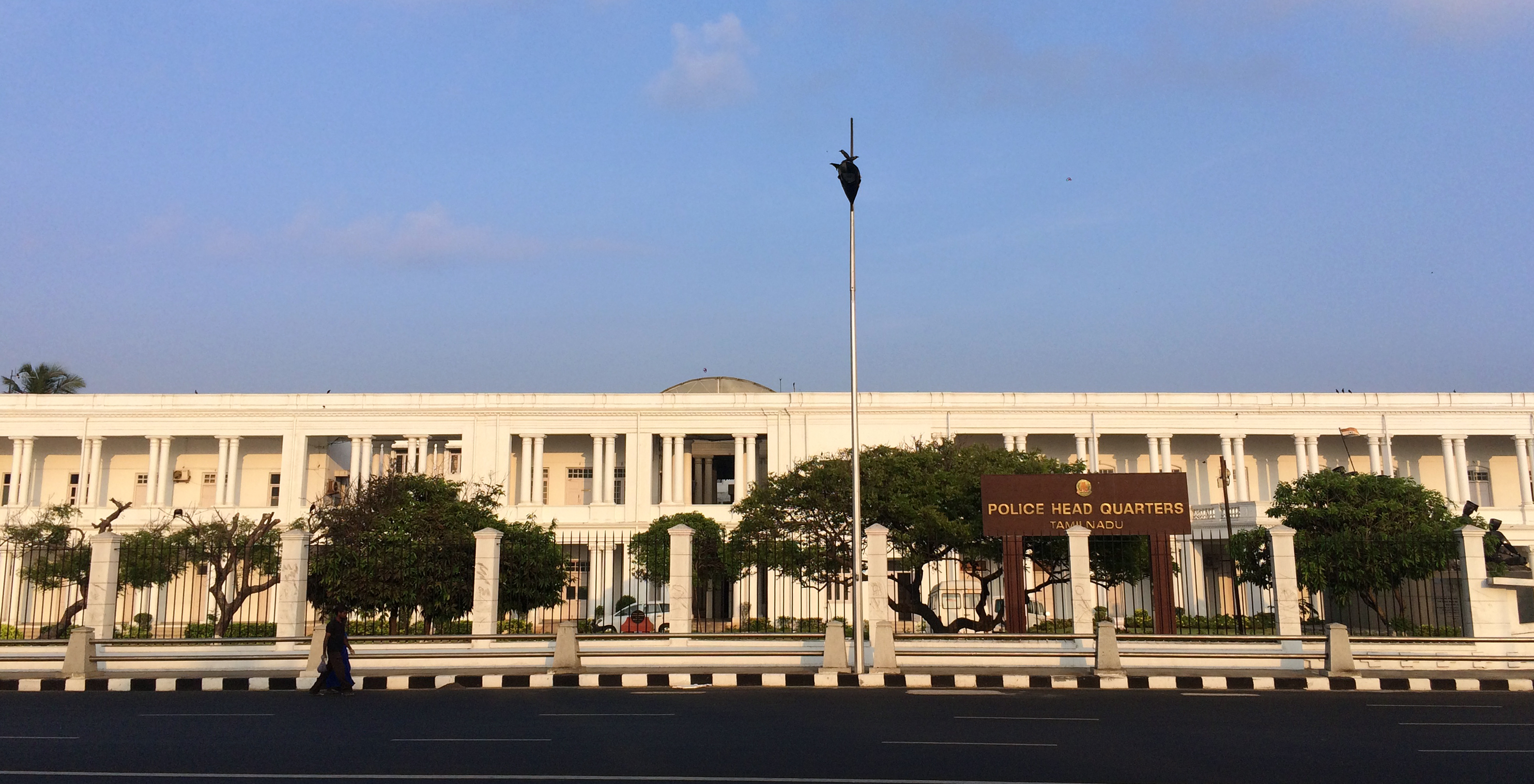
Tamil Nadu Police headquarters, Chennai

The state police function under the administrative control of the state home department, which is headed by the additional chief secretary or the principal secretary to the government, generally an officer of the Indian Administrative Service.

Each state maintains its own police force, headed by a Director General of Police (DGP), an officer of the Indian Police Service. The state police is responsible for the maintenance of law and order in both urban and rural areas. The director general of police who functions as the Head of Police Force (HoPF) is responsible for overall police administration in the state.

The DGP is supported by one or more Additional Directors General of Police (ADGs). Other officers of director general (DG) rank may be posted as heads of specialised organisations not directly under the control of the DGP, such as the police recruitment board, the fire and rescue services, training academies, anti corruption bureau, prisons department, etc. Additional Directors General of Police (ADGs) head specialised bureaus and functional areas such as law and order, intelligence, administration, the crime branch, training, armed police and other related divisions. These special units has its own administrative/operational divisions; and officers.

The General Executive Branch—also known as the Civil Police or Law and Order Wing—is divided into police zones, police ranges, and police districts for effective police administration. The structure of police zones and ranges varies from one state police force to another. Typically, a police zone consists of two or more police ranges and is headed by an Inspector General of Police (IG). A police range comprises several police districts and is headed by a Deputy Inspector General of Police (DIG). Prominent zones are generally headed by an ADG, while others are supervised by an Inspector General of Police (IG). Each range consists of several police districts and is headed either by an IG (in important ranges) or a Deputy Inspector General of Police (DIG).

A police district, headed by a Superintendent of Police (SP), is the primary operational and functional unit of the state police. The District Superintendent of Police is responsible for police administration in the district, including the maintenance of law and order, crime prevention, and crime investigation. In major districts, the post is designated as Senior Superintendent of Police (SSP), who may be assisted by two or more additional SPs. Where an SP heads the district, they are typically assisted by one or two Additional Superintendent of Polices (Addl.SPs). Each district is further divided into sub-divisions or circles, each under the charge of a Deputy Superintendent of Police (DSP). Sub-divisions comprise several police stations, which are headed by an Inspector of Police and supported by Sub-Inspectors (SIs) and Assistant Sub-Inspectors (ASIs).

In rural police districts, police circles exist between the subdivision and the police station. A police circle typically comprises two or three police stations and is headed by an inspector designated as the Circle Inspector. This system exists only in rural areas, where the officer in charge of a police station is usually a Sub-Inspector (SI). Officers of the rank of SI and above are authorised to file charge sheets in court.

The police constabulary, consisting of head constables and constables, forms the field-level staff of a police station. They perform routine policing functions such as beat patrolling, traffic management, crime prevention, and assisting in criminal investigations.

District SPs exercise significant discretionary authority in overseeing subordinate police stations, investigation units, equipment depots, armouries, and the traffic police. However, they do not possess the powers of an executive magistrate. Such powers are vested in the district magistrate (DM), an officer of the Indian Administrative Service, who is empowered to promulgate orders under Section 144 of the Code of Criminal Procedure and to issue arms licences.

=== Union Territory Police ===
The police forces of the Union territories function under the administrative control of the respective Union territory governments or, in some cases, directly under the Union Ministry of Home Affairs, depending on the territory. Each Union territory police force is headed by a senior Indian Police Service officer, designated as the Director General of Police or Inspector General of Police (IGP), according to the size and administrative requirements of the territory. Senior leadership of Union territory police forces, as well as some state police, is provided by officers of the AGMUT cadre of the Indian Police Service (IPS).

In larger Union territories, the force is organised into zones, each headed by an IGP, while the entire territory is overseen by a DGP. In smaller Union territories, the force is typically divided only into districts, each headed by a Superintendent of Police (SP), with the entire territory under the command of an IGP. For example, in the smallest Union territory, Lakshadweep, the police force is headed by a Superintendent of Police, while the Administrator of Lakshadweep serves as the ex officio IGP.

The organisational structure differs under the commissionerate system, as in the case of Delhi Police, where the police commissioner exercises both administrative and magisterial powers.

The hierarchy and operational setup in Union territories broadly mirror those of state police forces, with ranges, districts, sub-divisions, circles, and police stations forming the functional hierarchy.

=== Recruitment ===
The central government civil servants of Group 'A' under Indian Police Service cadre are recruited through civil services examination conducted by Union Public Service Commission. They command and provide leadership to the State and UT Police Forces.

The state government civil servants of Group 'B' under State Police Services cadre are recruited by combined competitive examination conducted by State Public Service Commission.

The state government civil servants of Group 'C' and Group 'D' of State Police cadre are recruited by subordinate services examination conducted by State Public Service Commission.

The central government civil servants of Group 'B' under Union Territory Police Service cadre are recruited by civil services examination conducted by Union Public Service Commission.

The central government civil servants of Group 'C' and Group 'D' of Union Territory Police cadre are recruited by combined graduate level examination and common entrance test conducted by Staff Selection Commission and National Recruitment Agency.

=== Uniforms ===
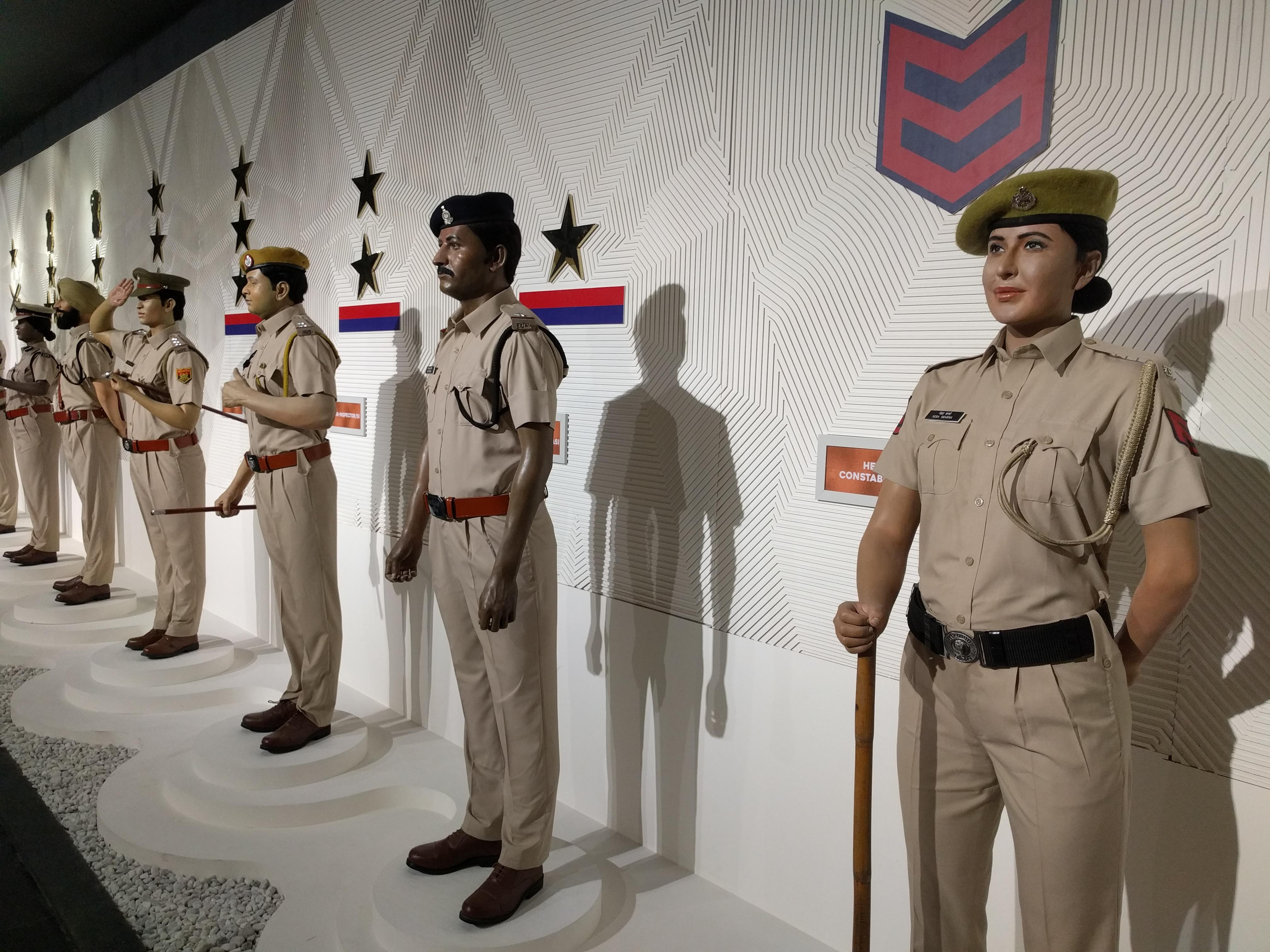
Exhibit of Indian police ranks and uniforms at the National Police Memorial and Museum, New Delhi

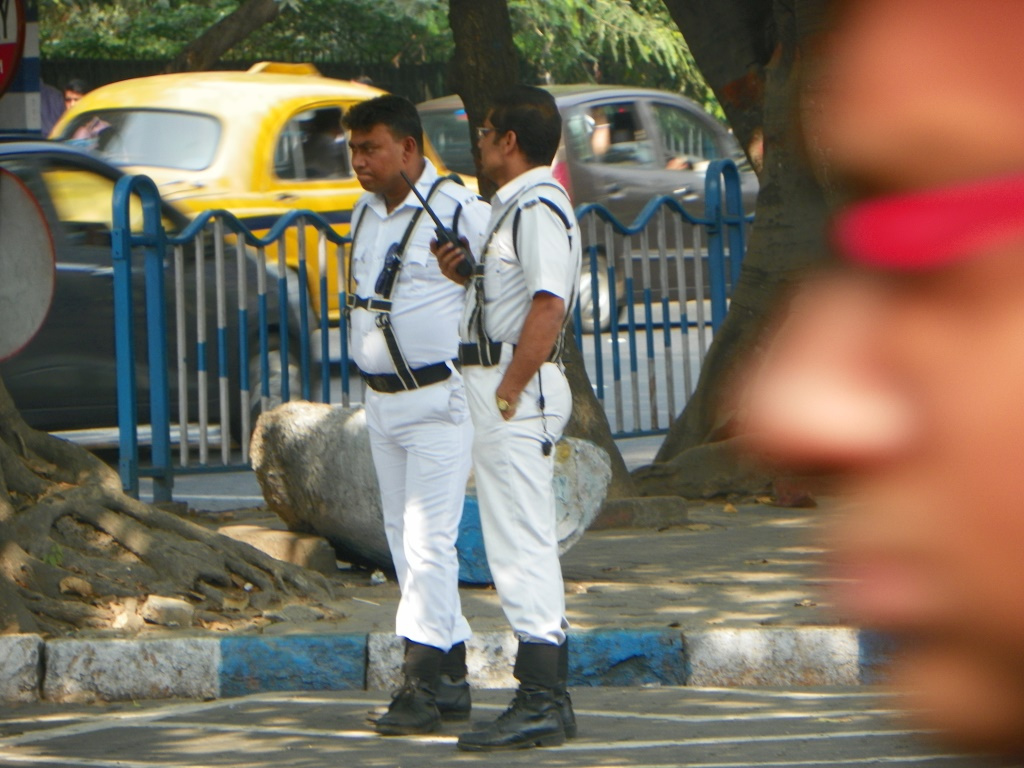
Kolkata police

Uniforms of state and local police vary by grade, region, and type of duty. The main service uniform for state police is khaki. Some city forces, such as the Kolkata Police, wear white uniforms. Headgear differs by rank and state; officers usually wear a peaked cap, and constables wear berets or sidecaps.

Services such as the Central Bureau of Investigation do not wear a uniform instead business dress (shirt, tie, blazer, etc.) is worn with a badge.

Special-service armed police have tactical uniforms in accordance with their function, and traffic police generally wear a white uniform.

== List of State Police Forces of India ==
SrNo	State	Police Force
1	Andhra Pradesh	Andhra Pradesh Police
2	Arunachal Pradesh	Arunachal Pradesh Police
3	Assam	Assam Police
4	Bihar	Bihar Police
5	Chhattisgarh	Chhattisgarh Police
6	Goa	Goa Police
7	Gujarat	Gujarat Police
8	Haryana	Haryana Police
9	Himachal Pradesh	Himachal Pradesh Police
10	Jharkhand	Jharkhand Police
11	Karnataka	Karnataka Police
12	Kerala	Kerala Police
13	Madhya Pradesh	Madhya Pradesh Police
14	Maharashtra	Maharashtra Police
15	Manipur	Manipur Police
16	Meghalaya	Meghalaya Police
17	Mizoram	Mizoram Police
18	Nagaland	Nagaland Police
19	Odisha	Odisha Police
20	Punjab	Punjab Police
21	Rajasthan	Rajasthan Police
22	Sikkim	Sikkim Police
23	Tamil Nadu	Tamil Nadu Police
24	Telangana	Telangana Police
25	Tripura	Tripura Police
26	Uttar Pradesh	Uttar Pradesh Police
27	Uttarakhand	Uttarakhand Police
28	West Bengal	West Bengal Police

== List of Union Territory Police Forces of India ==
SrNo	Union Territory	Police Force
1	Andaman and Nicobar Islands	Andaman Nicobar Islands Police
2	Chandigarh	Chandigarh Police
3	Dadra and Nagar Haveli and Daman and Diu	Dadra and Nagar Haveli and Daman and Diu Police
4	Delhi	Delhi Police
5	Jammu and Kashmir	Jammu and Kashmir Police
6	Ladakh	Ladakh Police
7	Lakshadweep	Lakshadweep Police
8	Puducherry	Puducherry Police

== Police Commissionerates ==
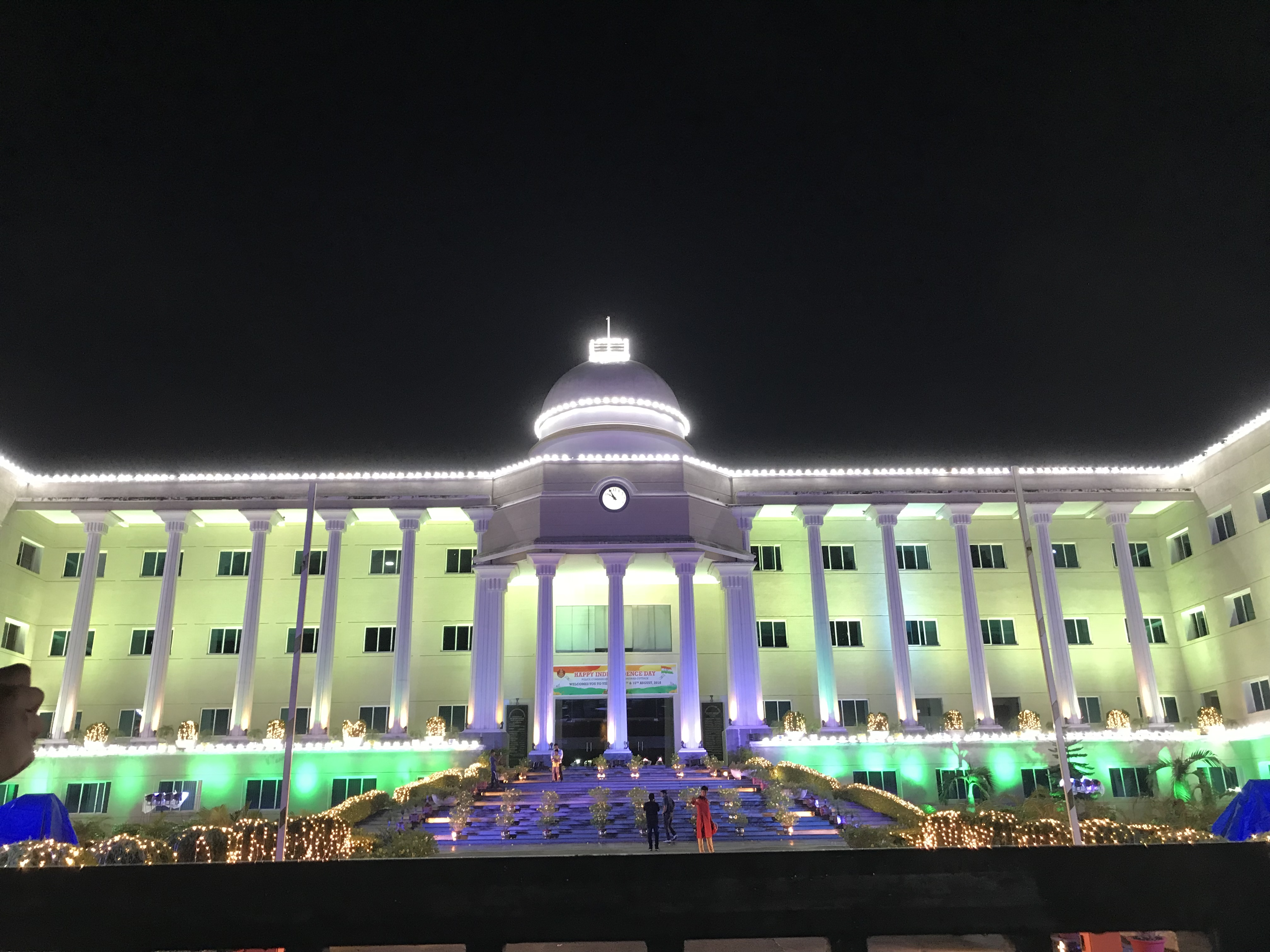
Commissionerate Police HQ Bhubaneswar-Cuttack decorated for Independence Day, 2018

Some major metropolitan cities use the police commissionerate system (like Delhi, Mumbai, Chennai, Kolkata, Bangalore, Hyderabad, Ahmedabad, Lucknow, Bhubaneswar-Cuttack etc.), headed by a Police Commissioner. Demand for this system is increasing as it gives police a free hand to act freely and take control of any situation. According to BPRD India, 65 large cities and suburban areas currently have this system. Even in British Raj, the presidency towns of Calcutta, Bombay and Madras had commissionerate system. Reporting to the Police Commissioner(CP) are the Joint Police Commissioner(Joint CPs), Deputy Commissioner of Police(DCPs) and Assistant Commissioner of Police(ACPs). Commissioners of police and their deputies are empowered as executive magistrates to enforce Section 163 of the BNSS and issue arms licenses.

== State and UT Armed Police Forces ==
In most states and territories, police forces are divided into civil (unarmed) police and armed contingents. Civil police staff police stations, conduct investigations, answer routine complaints, perform traffic duties, and patrol the streets. They usually carry lathis, a bamboo staff, weighted (or tipped) with iron.

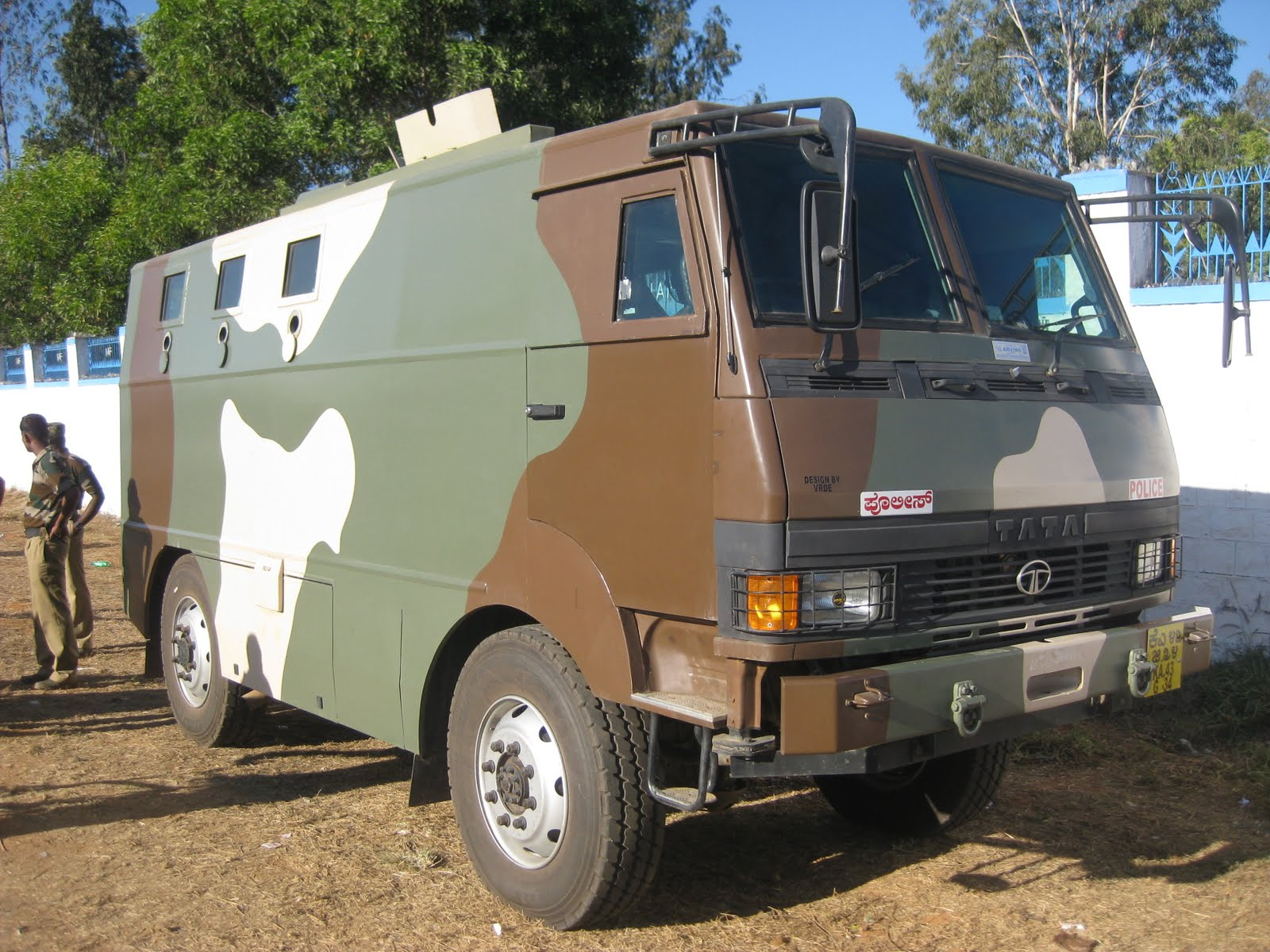
Armed SWAT vehicle of the Karnataka Police

Armed police are divided into two groups: district armed police and the Provincial Armed Constabulary (Pradeshik). District armed police are organized like an army infantry battalion. Assigned to police stations, they perform guard and escort duties. Each state police force maintains an armed force, with names such as Provincial Armed Constabulary (PAC) and Special Armed Police, which is responsible for emergencies and crowd control. They are generally activated on orders from a Deputy Inspector General or higher-level authorities. States which maintain armed contingents use them as an emergency reserve strike force. The units are organized as a mobile armed force under state control or, in the case of district armed police (who are not as well equipped), as a force directed by district superintendents and generally used for riot control.

The Provincial Armed Constabulary is an armed reserve maintained at key locations in some states and activated on orders from the deputy inspector general and higher-level authorities. Armed constabulary are not usually in contact with the public unless they are assigned to VIP duty or maintaining order during fairs, festivals, athletic events, elections, and natural disasters. They may be sent to quell outbreaks of student or labour unrest, organized crime, and communal riots; to maintain key guard posts, and to participate in anti-terrorism operations. Depending on the assignment, the Provincial Armed Constabulary may only carry lathis.

=== List of State Armed Police Forces ===
Sr No.	State	Sr No.	State Armed Police Forces
1	Andhra Pradesh	A	Andhra Pradesh Special Police
1	Andhra Pradesh	•	District Armed Reserve Police
1	Andhra Pradesh	B	India Reserve Battalion
2	Arunachal Pradesh	A	Arunachal Pradesh Armed Police
2	Arunachal Pradesh	B	India Reserve Battalion
3	Assam	A	Assam Police Battalion
3	Assam	B	India Reserve Battalion
4	Bihar	A	Bihar Military Police
5	Chhattisgarh	A	Chhattisgarh Armed Police
6	Goa	A	India Reserve Battalion
7	Gujarat	A	Gujarat State Reserve Police Force
8	Haryana	A	Haryana Armed Police
8	Haryana	B	India Reserve Battalion
9	Himachal Pradesh	A	India Reserve Battalion
10	Jharkhand	A	Jharkhand Armed Police
10	Jharkhand	B	India Reserve Battalion
11	Karnataka	A	Karnataka State Reserve Police
11	Karnataka	•	District Armed Reserve (DAR)
11	Karnataka	•	City Armed Reserve (CAR)
11	Karnataka	2.	India Reserve Battalion
11	Karnataka	3.	Karnataka Mounted Police
12	Kerala	A	Kerala Armed Police
12	Kerala	B	Malabar Special Police
12	Kerala	C	Kerala Special Armed Police
12	Kerala	C	Rapid Response and Rescue Force - RRRF
12	Kerala	D	Kerala Armed Women Police Battalion
12	Kerala	E	India Reserve Battalion
12	Kerala	F	Kerala Mounted Police
13	Madhya Pradesh		Madhya Pradesh Special Armed Police
14	Maharashtra		Maharashtra State Reserve Police Force
15	Manipur	A	Manipur Rifles
15	Manipur	B	India Reserve Battalion
16	Meghalaya	A	Meghalaya Police Battalion
16	Meghalaya	B	India Reserve Battalion
17	Mizoram	A	Mizoram Armed Police
17	Mizoram	B	India Reserve Battalion
18	Nagaland	A	Nagaland Armed Police
18	Nagaland	B	India Reserve Battalion
19	Odisha		Odisha Special Armed Police
20	Punjab	A	Punjab Armed Police
20	Punjab	B	India Reserve Battalion
21	Rajasthan	A	Rajasthan Armed Constabulary
21	Rajasthan	B	Maharana Pratap India Reserve Battalion
21	Rajasthan	C	Hadi Rani Mahila Ballation
21	Rajasthan	D	Mewar Bhil Corps
22	Sikkim	A	Sikkim Armed Police
22	Sikkim	B	India Reserve Battalion
23	Tamil Nadu	A	Tamil Nadu Special Police
23	Tamil Nadu	B	India Reserve Battalion
24	Telangana	A	Telangana State Special Police
24	Telangana	B	India Reserve Battalion
25	Tripura	A	Tripura State Rifles
25	Tripura	B	Tripura Special Armed Force
25	Tripura	C	India Reserve Battalion
26	Uttar Pradesh	A	Uttar Pradesh Provincial Armed Constabulary
27	Uttarakhand		Uttarakhand Provincial Armed Constabulary
28	West Bengal	A	West Bengal Armed Police
28	West Bengal	B	Eastern Frontier Rifles
28	West Bengal	C	Kolkata Armed Police

=== India Reserve Battalion ===
The India Reserve Battalion (IRB) is an armed police unit of the state and union territory police forces of India. Funded jointly by the Central and State governments, India Reserve Battalion provides additional manpower and resources to state police forces, improving their ability to handle law and order situations and internal security threats and reducing their reliance on Central Armed Police Forces (CAPFs). The objectives and mission of this Battalion are prevention of insurgency/extremism and other anti social activities against the country. They were also utilized in other national emergencies like calamities, disaster and riot control, etc. They are trained on the lines of Central Armed Police Forces (CAPFs).

The administrative control of the force was vested with the State government. The IRB is an integral part of the respective State Armed Police Forces (SAP). The Central Government has the first call on IRBn and can deploy these battalions anywhere in the country as and when required. State governments are obligated to comply with such requests, ensuring the availability of IRBn personnel for national security missions and disaster relief missions.

=== List of UT Armed Police Forces ===
Sr No.	Union Territory	Sr No.	UT Armed Police Forces
1	Andaman and Nicobar Islands	A	Andaman and Nicobar Armed Police
1	Andaman and Nicobar Islands	B	India Reserve Battalion
2	Chandigarh		India Reserve Battalion
3	Dadra and Nagar Haveli and Daman and Diu		India Reserve Battalion
4	Delhi		Delhi Armed Police
5	Jammu and Kashmir	A	Jammu and Kashmir Armed Police
5	Jammu and Kashmir	B	India Reserve Battalion
6	Ladakh		Ladakh Armed Police
7	Lakshadweep		India Reserve Battalion
8	Puducherry	A	Puducherry Armed Police
8	Puducherry	B	India Reserve Battalion

=== State and UT VIP Security Forces ===
State and UT Armed Police Forces are also assigned with the VIP Security along with CAPFs. They are also assigned the security of important places such as State Legislative Buildings, High Courts, Raj Bhavans, Raj Niwas, Administrator Office, Secretariats, etc.

== Special Units ==
These are specialized Police units created for some specific purposes such as counter-insurgency, counter-naxalites Operations, etc. They are trained for different purposes such as Jungle Warfare, Mountain Warfare, etc.

=== List of State/UT Special Police Forces ===
Sr No.	State/Union Territory	Sr No.	Police Emblem	Special Forces
1	Andhra Pradesh	A		Greyhounds (Police)
1	Andhra Pradesh	B		Organisation for Counter Terrorist Operations (OCTOPUS)
2	Arunachal Pradesh	A		Arunachal Pradesh STF
3	Assam	A		Assam Commando Battalion (Black Panthers)
3	Assam	B		APTF
3	Assam	C		Assam STF
4	Bihar	A		Patna Police SWAT Team
4	Bihar	B		Bihar ATS
5	Chhattisgarh	A		District Reserve Guard
5	Chhattisgarh	•		Danteshwari Ladake
5	Chhattisgarh	B		Chhattisgarh ATS
6	Goa			Goa ATS
7	Gujarat	A		Gujarat Police Chetak Commando Force
7	Gujarat	B		Gujarat ATS
8	Haryana	A		Haryana Police SWAT Team
8	Haryana	B		Haryana Police Tiger Commando Unit
9	Himachal Pradesh			
10	Jharkhand	A		Jharkhand ATS
10	Jharkhand	B		Jharkhand Jaguar Commando Force
11	Karnataka	A		Karnataka Police Garuda Commando Force
11	Karnataka	B		Karnataka Anti Naxal Force
12	Kerala	A		Kerala Thunderbolts
12	Kerala	B		Kerala Anti-Terrorism Squad (ATS)
12	Kerala			Special Operation Group (SOG)
13	Madhya Pradesh	A		Madhya Pradesh Police Hawk Commandos
13	Madhya Pradesh	B		Madhya Pradesh ATS
14	Maharashtra	A		Force One (Mumbai Police)
14	Maharashtra	B		Mumbai Police Emergency Response Team (ERT)
14	Maharashtra	C		C-60 Commando Force
14	Maharashtra	D		Maharashtra ATS
15	Manipur			Manipur Police Commandos
16	Meghalaya			SF-10 Commando Force
17	Mizoram			Mizoram Police SWAT Team
18	Nagaland			Nagaland Special Task Force
19	Odisha	A		Odisha Police SOG
19	Odisha	•		Special Tactical Unit (STU)
19	Odisha	B		District Voluntary Force (DVF)
20	Punjab	A		Punjab Police SWAT Team
20	Punjab	B		Punjab Commando Police
21	Rajasthan	A		Rajasthan Police Emergency Response Team (ERT)
21	Rajasthan	B		Rajasthan ATS
21	Rajasthan	C		Special Operations Group (SOG)
22	Sikkim			Sikkim Special Task Force
23	Tamil Nadu			Tamil Nadu Commando Force (TNCF)
24	Telangana	A		Greyhounds (Police)
24	Telangana	B		Organisation for Counter Terrorist Operations (OCTOPUS)
25	Tripura			
26	Uttar Pradesh	A		UP SWAT Team
26	Uttar Pradesh	B		UP ATS
26	Uttar Pradesh	C		Special Police Operations Team/Special Operation Group(SPOT/SOG)
26	Uttar Pradesh	D		UP STF
27	Uttarakhand			Uttarakhand ATS
28	West Bengal	A		STRACO Force
28	West Bengal	B		Counter Insurgency Force
28	West Bengal	C		Commando Force
28	West Bengal	D		West Bengal ATS
29	Delhi NCT	A		Delhi Police Special Cell
29	Delhi NCT	•		Delhi Police SWAT Team
30	Jammu and Kashmir			J&K Special Operations Group (Jammu and Kashmir)

== State Industrial Security Forces ==
State Industrial Security Force is a type of State Armed Police Force, created on the lines of Central Industrial Security Force to protect the airports, factories, etc. of state importance.

=== List of State Industrial Security Forces ===
Sr No.	State	SISF
1	Andhra Pradesh	Special Protection Force (SPF)
2	Arunachal Pradesh	
3	Assam	Assam Industrial Security Force
4	Bihar	Bihar Special Armed Police Force
5	Chhattisgarh	
6	Goa	
7	Gujarat	Gujarat Industrial Security Force
8	Haryana	Haryana Industrial Security Force
9	Himachal Pradesh	
10	Jharkhand	Jharkhand Industrial Security Force
11	Karnataka	Karnataka State Industrial Security Force (KSISF)
12	Kerala	Kerala State Industrial Security Force (SISF)
13	Madhya Pradesh	Madhya Pradesh State Industrial Security Force
14	Maharashtra	Maharashtra Security Force
15	Manipur	
16	Meghalaya	
17	Mizoram	
18	Nagaland	
19	Odisha	Odisha Industrial Security Force
20	Punjab	
21	Rajasthan	
22	Sikkim	
23	Tamil Nadu	Tamil Nadu Industrial Security Force (TISF) (In Proposal)
24	Telangana	
25	Tripura	
26	Uttar Pradesh	Uttar Pradesh Special Security Force (UPSSF)
27	Uttarakhand	
28	West Bengal	

== Coastal Police (Marine Police) & River Police ==
State/UT Coastal Police is type of State/UT Armed Police which was created to make an extra security layer on the coastal region. Coastal Police have the responsibility to secure the coasts of the respective States and UTs, along the Indian Coast Guard.

=== List of State and UT Coastal Police ===
Sr No.	State/UT	Coastal Police
1	Andhra Pradesh	Andhra Pradesh Marine Police
2	Goa	Goa Marine Police
3	Gujarat	Gujarat Marine Police
4	Karnataka	Karnataka Marine Police
5	Kerala	Kerala Coastal Police
6	Maharashtra	Maharashtra Marine Police
7	Odisha	Odisha Marine Police
8	Tamil Nadu	Tamil Nadu Marine Police
9	West Bengal	West Bengal Marine Police
10	Andaman and Nicobar Islands	Andaman and Nicobar Police Marine Force
11	Dadra and Nagar Haveli and Daman and Diu	Dadra and Nagar Haveli and Daman and Diu Coastal Police
12	Lakshadweep	Lakshadweep Coastal Security Police
13	Puducherry	Puducherry Coastal Security Police

=== List of River Police Forces ===
Sr No.	State/UT	River Police Forces
1	Assam	Assam River Police

== Traffic Police ==
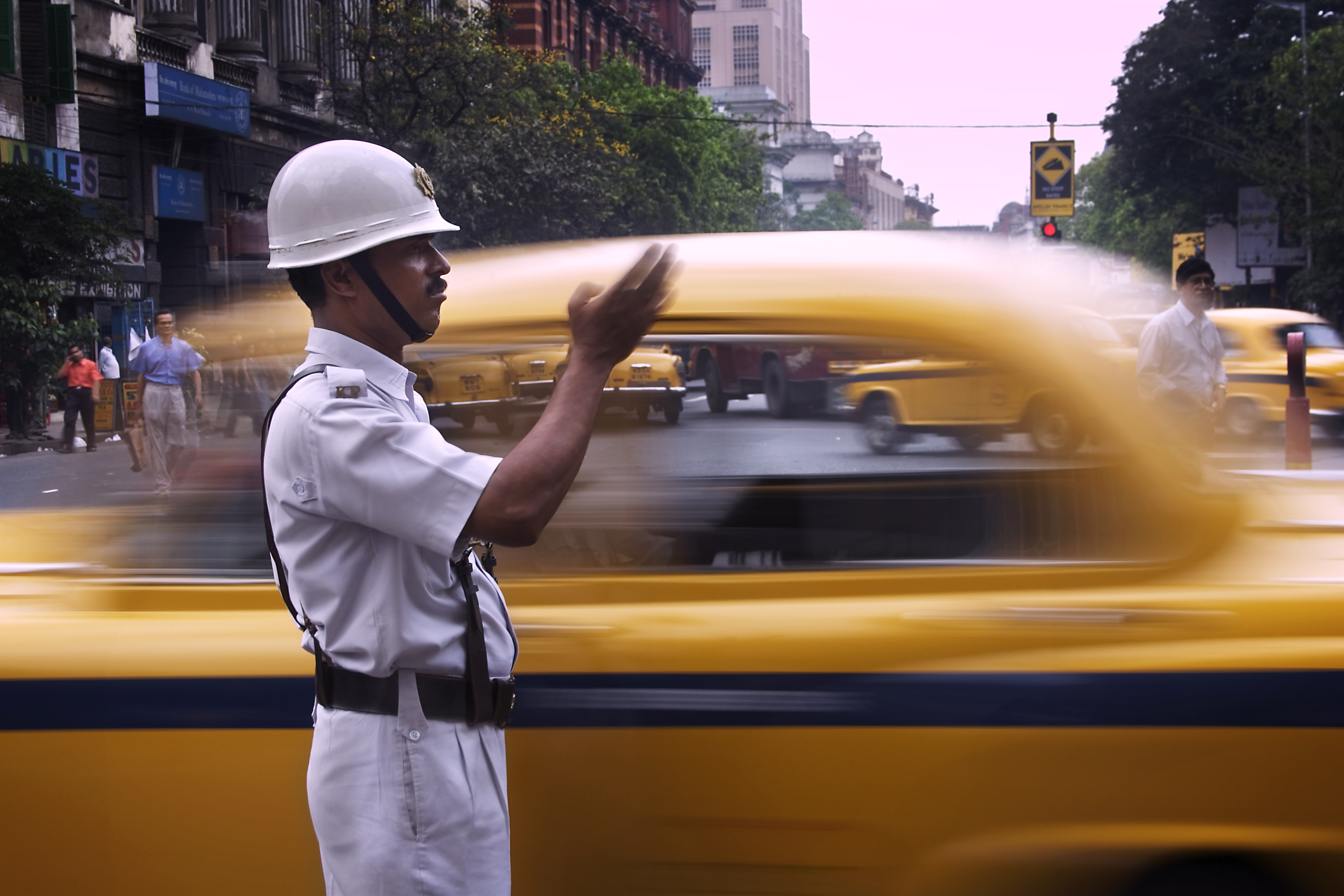
Traffic Police directing cars in Kolkata.

Highway and traffic police in small towns are under the state police; traffic police in cities are under the metropolitan and state police. Traffic police maintain a smooth traffic flow and stop offenders. Highway police secure the highways and catch speeders. Accidents, registrations, and vehicle data are checked by traffic police.

=== Traffic Police ===
List of Traffic Police
Sr No.	State/UT	Sr No.	Traffic Police
1	Andhra Pradesh	#	AP Traffic Police
1	Andhra Pradesh	A	Vijayawada City Traffic Police
1	Andhra Pradesh	B	Visakhapatnam City Traffic Police
2	Arunachal Pradesh		Arunachal Pradesh Traffic Police
3	Assam	#	Assam Traffic Police
3	Assam	A	Guwahati Traffic Police
4	Bihar		Bihar Traffic Police
5	Chhattisgarh		Chhattisgarh Traffic Police
6	Goa		Goa Traffic Police
7	Gujarat	#	Gujarat Traffic Police
7	Gujarat	A	Ahmedabad Traffic Police
7	Gujarat	B	Rajkot Traffic Police
7	Gujarat	C	Surat Traffic Police
7	Gujarat	D	Vadodara Traffic Police
8	Haryana	#	Haryana Traffic Police
8	Haryana	A	Faridabad Traffic Police
8	Haryana	B	Gurugram Traffic Police
8	Haryana	C	Panchkula Traffic Police
9	Himachal Pradesh		HP Traffic Police
10	Jharkhand		Jharkhand Traffic Police
11	Karnataka	#	Karnataka Traffic Police
11	Karnataka	A	Bengaluru Traffic Police
11	Karnataka	B	Mangaluru Traffic Police
12	Kerala	#	Kerala Traffic Police
12	Kerala	A	Kochi Traffic Police
12	Kerala	B	Thiruvananthapuram Traffic Police
13	Madhya Pradesh		Madhya Pradesh Traffic Police
14	Maharashtra	#	Maharashtra Traffic Police
14	Maharashtra	A	Mumbai Traffic Police
14	Maharashtra	B	Pune Traffic Police
14	Maharashtra	C	Nagpur Traffic Police
15	Manipur		Manipur Traffic Police
16	Meghalaya		Meghalaya Traffic Police
17	Mizoram		Mizoram Traffic Police
18	Nagaland	#	Nagaland Traffic Police
18	Nagaland	A	Dimapur Traffic Police
19	Odisha	#	Odisha Traffic Police
19	Odisha	A	Bhubaneswar Traffic Police
20	Punjab	#	Punjab Traffic Police
20	Punjab	A	Amritsar Traffic Police
21	Rajasthan	#	Rajasthan Traffic Police
21	Rajasthan	A	Jaipur City Traffic Police
21	Rajasthan	B	Jodhpur Traffic Police
22	Sikkim		Sikkim Traffic Police
23	Tamil Nadu	#	TN Traffic Police
23	Tamil Nadu	A	Chennai Traffic Police
24	Telangana	#	Telangana Traffic Police
24	Telangana	A	Hyderabad Traffic Police
24	Telangana	B	Cyberabad Traffic Police
25	Tripura		Tripura Traffic Police
26	Uttar Pradesh	#	Uttar Pradesh Traffic Police
26	Uttar Pradesh	A	Lucknow City Traffic Police
26	Uttar Pradesh	B	Gautam Buddha Nagar Traffic Police
27	Uttarakhand		Uttarakhand Traffic Police
28	West Bengal	#	West Bengal Traffic Police
28	West Bengal	A	Kolkata Traffic Police
29	Andaman and Nicobar Islands		Andaman and Nicobar Traffic Police
30	Chandigarh		Chandigarh Traffic Police
31	Dadra and Nagar Haveli and Daman and Diu		
32	Delhi NCT		Delhi Traffic Police
33	Jammu and Kashmir		J & K Traffic Police
34	Ladakh		
35	Lakshadweep		
36	Puducherry		Puducherry Traffic Police

== Highway Police / Highway Patrol ==
Highway Police or Highway Patrol is a specialized unit of state police forces. The main objectives of Highway Police are controlling Traffic, enforcement of Traffic Laws, prevention of Road Accidents, providing immediate attention and assistance to victims of accidents, handling of Law & Order issues, and enforcement of Laws on National Highways and State Highways, etc. Each Highway Patrol Vehicle is assigned an 'Operational area' and a Base Station.

List of Highway Police/Highway Patrol
Sr No.	State/UT	Highway Patrol Police
1	Andhra Pradesh	AP Road Safety Vehicles
2	Arunachal Pradesh	
3	Assam	
4	Bihar	
5	Chhattisgarh	
6	Goa	
7	Gujarat	
8	Haryana	
9	Himachal Pradesh	
10	Jharkhand	
11	Karnataka	Karnataka Highway Patrol
12	Kerala	Kerala Highway Police
13	Madhya Pradesh	
14	Maharashtra	Maharashtra Highway Police
15	Manipur	
16	Meghalaya	
17	Mizoram	
18	Nagaland	
19	Odisha	
20	Punjab	Punjab Highway Patrol
21	Rajasthan	
22	Sikkim	
23	Tamil Nadu	Tamil Nadu Highway Patrol
24	Telangana	
25	Tripura	
26	Uttar Pradesh	Uttar Pradesh Highway Police (UPHP)
27	Uttarakhand	
28	West Bengal	

== Railway Police ==
GRP units are a state maintained forces with its own command structure on Railways with the maintenance cost borne on 50% basis each by particular State and Railways. RPF maintains liaison with GRP for the Law & Order and Crime related matters.

=== List of State and UT Government Railway Police ===
Sr No.	State/UT	Sr No.	Government Railway Police
1	Andhra Pradesh		Andhra Pradesh GRP
2	Arunachal Pradesh		
3	Assam		Assam GRP
4	Bihar		Bihar GRP
5	Chhattisgarh		Chhattisgarh GRP
6	Goa		Goa GRP
7	Gujarat		Gujarat GRP
8	Haryana		Haryana GRP
9	Himachal Pradesh		
10	Jharkhand		Jharkhand GRP
11	Karnataka		Karnataka GRP
12	Kerala		Kerala Railway Police (GRP)
13	Madhya Pradesh		Madhya Pradesh GRP
14	Maharashtra	•	Maharashtra GRP
14	Maharashtra	A	Mumbai Railway Police Commissionerate
14	Maharashtra	B	Nagpur Railway Police
14	Maharashtra	C	Pune Railway Police
15	Manipur		
16	Meghalaya		
17	Mizoram		
18	Nagaland		
19	Odisha		Odisha GRP
20	Punjab		Punjab GRP
21	Rajasthan		Rajasthan GRP
22	Sikkim		
23	Tamil Nadu		Tamil Nadu GRP
24	Telangana		Telangana GRP
25	Tripura		Tripura GRP
26	Uttar Pradesh	•	Uttar Pradesh GRP
26	Uttar Pradesh	A	Lucknow GRP
26	Uttar Pradesh	B	Allahabad (Prayagraj) GRP
27	Uttarakhand		
28	West Bengal	•	West Bengal GRP
28	West Bengal	A	Howrah GRP
28	West Bengal	B	Kharagpur GRP
28	West Bengal	C	Sealdah GRP
28	West Bengal	D	Siliguri GRP
29	Andaman and Nicobar Islands		
30	Chandigarh		
31	Dadra and Nagar Haveli and Daman and Diu		
32	Delhi NCT		Delhi GRP
33	Jammu and Kashmir	•	J & K GRP
33	Jammu and Kashmir	A	Katra GRP
33	Jammu and Kashmir	B	Jammu GRP
33	Jammu and Kashmir	C	Kashmir GRP
34	Ladakh		
35	Lakshadweep		
36	Puducherry		

== Tourist Police ==
As the security of tourists is a state subject, the Ministry of Tourism (India), in consultation with the State Governments and Union Territory Administrations, had proposed to set up tourist police units at prominent tourist spots in the country. As of 2018, 14 States/UTs have deployed the Tourist Police in their States/UTs.

=== List of Tourist Police ===
Sr No.	State/UT	Tourist Police
1	Andhra Pradesh	AP Tourist Police
2	Arunachal Pradesh	Arunachal Pradesh Tourist Police
3	Assam	
4	Bihar	
5	Chhattisgarh	
6	Goa	Goa Tourist Police
7	Gujarat	
8	Haryana	
9	Himachal Pradesh	HP Tourist Police
10	Jharkhand	
11	Karnataka	Karnataka Tourist Police
12	Kerala	Kerala Tourism Police Kerala Temple Police
13	Madhya Pradesh	Madhya Pradesh Tourist Police
14	Maharashtra	Maharashtra Tourist Police
15	Manipur	
16	Meghalaya	
17	Mizoram	
18	Nagaland	Nagaland Tourist Police
19	Odisha	Odisha Tourist Police
20	Punjab	Punjab Tourist Police
21	Rajasthan	Rajasthan Tourist Police
22	Sikkim	
23	Tamil Nadu	
24	Telangana	Telangana Tourist Police
25	Tripura	
26	Uttar Pradesh	Uttar Pradesh Tourist Police
27	Uttarakhand	
28	West Bengal	
29	Andaman and Nicobar Islands	
30	Chandigarh	
31	Dadra and Nagar Haveli and Daman and Diu	
32	Delhi NCT	Delhi Tourist Police
33	Jammu and Kashmir	J & K Tourist Police
34	Ladakh	Ladakh Tourist Police (In Proposal)
35	Lakshadweep	
36	Puducherry	

== Criminal Investigation Department (CB CID) / Crime Branch ==
A Criminal Investigation Department (CID) or Crime Branch is a specialized investigation Wing of the State Police forces of India responsible for the investigation of crime, based on the Criminal Investigation Departments of British police forces. CID is further split into Crime Branch (CB-CID), Anti Narcotics and many further divisions concerned with matters pertaining to crime, investigation, prosecution and collection of criminal intelligence, depending upon the state's Police administration . The nomenclature of CID is different in various states. Some states it is known as Crime Branch and others Criminal Investigation Department (CID) or Criminal Investigation Agency.The functioning of this wing is almost same in all the states. The Criminal Investigations Department (CID) or State Crime Branch is headed by an Additional Director General of Police (ADG).

For effective administration, it is organised into various functional divisions/wings and territorial divisions, and consists of senior police officers as well as legal officers, scientific experts, and public prosecutors. Officers of this department are appointed on deputation from the general law-and-order wing of the State Police. The department includes personnel ranging from constables to inspectors general. In some departments, officials use the prefix Detective before their rank designation, such as Detective Inspector.

=== List of Crime Investigation Departments and Branches ===
Sr No.	State/UT	CID	Sr No.	Branches
1	Andhra Pradesh	Andhra Pradesh CID	A	Crime Branch
1	Andhra Pradesh	Andhra Pradesh CID	B	Economic Offences Wing
1	Andhra Pradesh	Andhra Pradesh CID	C	Cyber Cell
1	Andhra Pradesh	Andhra Pradesh CID	D	Special Branch
2	Arunachal Pradesh	Arunachal Pradesh CID	A	Crime Branch
2	Arunachal Pradesh	Arunachal Pradesh CID	B	Economic Offences Wing
2	Arunachal Pradesh	Arunachal Pradesh CID	C	
2	Arunachal Pradesh	Arunachal Pradesh CID	D	Special Branch
3	Assam	Assam CID	A	Crime Branch
3	Assam	Assam CID	B	Economic Offences Wing
3	Assam	Assam CID	C	Cyber Cell
3	Assam	Assam CID	D	Special Branch
4	Bihar	Bihar CID	A	Crime Branch
4	Bihar	Bihar CID	B	Economic Offences Unit
4	Bihar	Bihar CID	C	Cyber Cell
4	Bihar	Bihar CID	D	Special Branch
5	Chhattisgarh	Chhattisgarh CID	A	Crime Branch
5	Chhattisgarh	Chhattisgarh CID	B	Economic Offences Wing
5	Chhattisgarh	Chhattisgarh CID	C	
5	Chhattisgarh	Chhattisgarh CID	D	Special Branch
6	Goa	Goa CID	A	Crime Branch
6	Goa	Goa CID	B	Economic Offences Cell
6	Goa	Goa CID	C	
6	Goa	Goa CID	D	Special Branch
7	Gujarat	Gujarat CID	A	Crime Branch
7	Gujarat	Gujarat CID	B	Economic Offences Wing
7	Gujarat	Gujarat CID	C	Cyber Cell
7	Gujarat	Gujarat CID	D	Special Branch
8	Haryana	Haryana CID	A	Crime Branch
8	Haryana	Haryana CID	B	Economic Offences Wing
8	Haryana	Haryana CID	C	Haryana Cyber Crime and Technical Investigation Cell
8	Haryana	Haryana CID	D	Special Branch
9	Himachal Pradesh	HP CID	A	Crime Branch
9	Himachal Pradesh	HP CID	B	
9	Himachal Pradesh	HP CID	C	Cyber Cell
9	Himachal Pradesh	HP CID	D	Special Branch
10	Jharkhand	Jharkhand CID	A	Crime Branch
10	Jharkhand	Jharkhand CID	B	Economic Offences Wing
10	Jharkhand	Jharkhand CID	C	
10	Jharkhand	Jharkhand CID	D	Special Branch
11	Karnataka	Karnataka CID	A	Crime Branch
11	Karnataka	Karnataka CID	B	Economic Offences Wing
11	Karnataka	Karnataka CID	C	Cyber Cell
11	Karnataka	Karnataka CID	D	Special Branch
11	Karnataka	Karnataka CID	E	Forest Cell
12	Kerala	Crime Branch.	A	Hurt & Homicide Wing
12	Kerala	Crime Branch.	B	Economic Offences Wing
12	Kerala	Crime Branch.	C	Hi-Tech Crime Enquiry Cell
12	Kerala	Crime Branch.	D	Anti Piracy Cell
12	Kerala	Crime Branch.	E	Organised Crime Wing
13	Madhya Pradesh	Madhya Pradesh CID	A	Crime Branch
13	Madhya Pradesh	Madhya Pradesh CID	B	Economic Offences Wing
13	Madhya Pradesh	Madhya Pradesh CID	C	Cyber Cell
13	Madhya Pradesh	Madhya Pradesh CID	D	Special Branch
14	Maharashtra	Maharashtra CID	A	Crime Branch
14	Maharashtra	Maharashtra CID	B	Economic Offences Wing
14	Maharashtra	Maharashtra CID	C	Cyber Cell
14	Maharashtra	Maharashtra CID	D	Special Branch
15	Manipur	Manipur CID	A	Crime Branch
15	Manipur	Manipur CID	B	Economic Offences Wing
15	Manipur	Manipur CID	C	
15	Manipur	Manipur CID	D	Special Branch
16	Meghalaya	Meghalaya CID	A	Crime Branch
16	Meghalaya	Meghalaya CID	B	
16	Meghalaya	Meghalaya CID	C	
16	Meghalaya	Meghalaya CID	D	Special Branch
17	Mizoram	Mizoram CID	A	Crime Branch
17	Mizoram	Mizoram CID	B	Economic Offences Wing
17	Mizoram	Mizoram CID	C	
17	Mizoram	Mizoram CID	D	Special Branch
18	Nagaland	Nagaland CID	A	Crime Branch
18	Nagaland	Nagaland CID	B	
18	Nagaland	Nagaland CID	C	
18	Nagaland	Nagaland CID	D	Special Branch
19	Odisha	Odisha CID	A	Crime Branch
19	Odisha	Odisha CID	B	Economic Offences Wing
19	Odisha	Odisha CID	C	Cyber Cell
19	Odisha	Odisha CID	D	Special Branch
20	Punjab	Punjab Bureau of Investigation	A	Crime Branch
20	Punjab	Punjab Bureau of Investigation	B	Economic Offences Wing
20	Punjab	Punjab Bureau of Investigation	C	Cyber Cell
20	Punjab	Punjab Bureau of Investigation	D	Special Branch
21	Rajasthan	Rajasthan CID	A	Crime Branch
21	Rajasthan	Rajasthan CID	B	Economic Offences Wing
21	Rajasthan	Rajasthan CID	C	Cyber Cell
21	Rajasthan	Rajasthan CID	D	Special Branch
22	Sikkim	Sikkim CID	A	Crime Branch
22	Sikkim	Sikkim CID	B	Economic Offences Wing
22	Sikkim	Sikkim CID	C	
22	Sikkim	Sikkim CID	D	Special Branch
23	Tamil Nadu	TN Crime Branch-CID	A	Crime Branch
23	Tamil Nadu	TN Crime Branch-CID	B	Economic Offences Wing
23	Tamil Nadu	TN Crime Branch-CID	C	Cyber Cell
23	Tamil Nadu	TN Crime Branch-CID	D	Special Branch
24	Telangana	Telangana CID	A	Crime Branch
24	Telangana	Telangana CID	B	Economic Offences Wing
24	Telangana	Telangana CID	C	Cyber Cell
24	Telangana	Telangana CID	D	Special Branch
25	Tripura	Tripura CID	A	Crime Branch
25	Tripura	Tripura CID	B	Economic Offences Wing
25	Tripura	Tripura CID	C	Cyber Cell
25	Tripura	Tripura CID	D	Special Branch
26	Uttar Pradesh	UP CID	A	Crime Branch
26	Uttar Pradesh	UP CID	B	Economic Offences Wing
26	Uttar Pradesh	UP CID	C	Cyber Cell
26	Uttar Pradesh	UP CID	D	Special Branch
27	Uttarakhand	UK CID	A	Crime Branch
27	Uttarakhand	UK CID	B	Economic Offences Wing
27	Uttarakhand	UK CID	C	Cyber Cell
27	Uttarakhand	UK CID	D	Special Branch
28	West Bengal	WB CID	A	Crime Branch
28	West Bengal	WB CID	B	Economic Offences Wing
28	West Bengal	WB CID	C	Cyber Cell
28	West Bengal	WB CID	D	Special Branch
29	Andaman and Nicobar Islands	Andaman and Nicobar CID	A	
29	Andaman and Nicobar Islands	Andaman and Nicobar CID	B	
29	Andaman and Nicobar Islands	Andaman and Nicobar CID	C	
29	Andaman and Nicobar Islands	Andaman and Nicobar CID	D	
30	Chandigarh	Chandigarh CID	A	Crime Branch
30	Chandigarh	Chandigarh CID	B	Economic Offences Wing
30	Chandigarh	Chandigarh CID	C	Cyber Cell
30	Chandigarh	Chandigarh CID	D	Special Branch
31	Dadra and Nagar Haveli and Daman and Diu		A	
31	Dadra and Nagar Haveli and Daman and Diu		B	
31	Dadra and Nagar Haveli and Daman and Diu		C	
31	Dadra and Nagar Haveli and Daman and Diu		D	
32	Delhi NCT	Delhi Police Crime Branch	A	Crime Branch
32	Delhi NCT	Delhi Police Crime Branch	B	Economic Offences Wing
32	Delhi NCT	Delhi Police Crime Branch	C	Cyber Cell
32	Delhi NCT	Delhi Police Crime Branch	D	Special Branch
33	Jammu and Kashmir	J & K CID	A	Crime Branch
33	Jammu and Kashmir	J & K CID	B	Economic Offences Wing
33	Jammu and Kashmir	J & K CID	C	Cyber Cell
33	Jammu and Kashmir	J & K CID	D	Special Branch
34	Ladakh		A	
34	Ladakh		B	
34	Ladakh		C	
34	Ladakh		D	
35	Lakshadweep		A	
35	Lakshadweep		B	
35	Lakshadweep		C	
35	Lakshadweep		D	
36	Puducherry	Puducherry CID	A	Crime Branch
36	Puducherry	Puducherry CID	B	
36	Puducherry	Puducherry CID	C	
36	Puducherry	Puducherry CID	D	Special Branch

=== List of CID in Police Commissionerates ===
Sr No.	Commissionerate	CID	Sr No.	Branches
1	Kolkata Police	Kolkata CID	A	Kolkata Police Detective Department
1	Kolkata Police	Kolkata CID	B	Kolkata Police Enforcement Branch
1	Kolkata Police	Kolkata CID	C	Kolkata Police Cyber Cell
1	Kolkata Police	Kolkata CID	D	Special Branch
2	Bengaluru City Police	Central Crime Branch (CCB)	A	Special Enquiry Cell
2	Bengaluru City Police	Central Crime Branch (CCB)	B	Organised Crime Wing
2	Bengaluru City Police	Central Crime Branch (CCB)	C	Women Protection Wing
2	Bengaluru City Police	Central Crime Branch (CCB)	D	Anti Narcotics Wing
2	Bengaluru City Police	Central Crime Branch (CCB)	E	Economic Offences Wing
3	Greater Mumbai Police	Crime Branch	A	Detection Branch
3	Greater Mumbai Police	Crime Branch	B	Preventive Branch
3	Greater Mumbai Police	Crime Branch	C	Missing Persons Bureau
3	Greater Mumbai Police	Crime Branch	D	Cyber Crime Branch
3	Greater Mumbai Police	Crime Branch	E	Anti Narcotics Cell

=== State Enforcement Branches (Economic Offences Wing) ===
To detect and prevent the commercial crimes, tax evasions, etc. in the State, some States have their own separate Enforcement Branches with their Police Departments.

=== State Bureau of Investigation ===
1. Punjab Bureau of Investigation; The specialized investigation wing of the Government of Punjab.

=== Special Investigation Team (SIT) ===
To investigate the heinous crimes, State Governments/UT Administrations can deploy the Special Investigation Teams.

== Intelligence / Special Branch ==
Sl. No.	State / Union Territory	Intelligence Agency
1	Andhra Pradesh	Intelligence Department, Andhra Pradesh Police
2	Arunachal Pradesh	Special Branch, Arunachal Pradesh Police
3	Assam	Special Branch, Assam Police
4	Bihar	Special Branch, Bihar Police
5	Chhattisgarh	Special Branch, Chhattisgarh Police
6	Goa	Special Branch, Goa Police
7	Gujarat	State Intelligence Bureau
8	Haryana	State Intelligence, Haryana Police
9	Himachal Pradesh	CID (Intelligence Wing), Himachal Pradesh Police
10	Jharkhand	Special Branch, Jharkhand Police
11	Karnataka	State Intelligence, Karnataka
12	Kerala	State Special Branch, Kerala Police
13	Madhya Pradesh	State Intelligence Bureau, Madhya Pradesh Police
14	Maharashtra	State Intelligence Department, Maharashtra Police
15	Manipur	Special Branch, Manipur Police
16	Meghalaya	Special Branch, Meghalaya Police
17	Mizoram	Special Branch, Mizoram Police
18	Nagaland	Special Branch, Nagaland Police
19	Odisha	Special Branch, Odisha Police
20	Punjab	State Special Branch, Punjab Police
21	Rajasthan	Intelligence Bureau, Rajasthan Police
22	Sikkim	Special Branch, Sikkim Police
23	Tamil Nadu	Q Branch, Tamil Nadu Police
24	Telangana	Intelligence Department, Telangana Police
25	Tripura	Special Branch, Tripura Police
26	Uttar Pradesh	Intelligence Wing, Uttar Pradesh Police
27	Uttarakhand	Special Branch, Uttarakhand Police
28	West Bengal	Intelligence Branch, West Bengal Police
29	Andaman and Nicobar Islands	Special Branch, A&N Police
30	Chandigarh	Special Branch, Chandigarh Police
31	Dadra and Nagar Haveli and Daman and Diu	Special Branch, UT Police
32	Delhi	Special Branch, Delhi Police
33	Jammu and Kashmir	CID (Intelligence Wing), Jammu and Kashmir Police
34	Ladakh	Special Branch, Ladakh Police
35	Lakshadweep	Special Branch, Lakshadweep Police
36	Puducherry	Special Branch, Puducherry Police

== Technical Services ==
=== Police Communication Facilities ===
List of Police Communication Facilities
Sr No.	State/UT	Facilities
1	Andhra Pradesh	Andhra Pradesh Police Communication
2	Arunachal Pradesh	Arunachal Pradesh Police Telecommunication
3	Assam	Assam Police Radio Organisation
4	Bihar	Bihar Police Radio Organisation
5	Chhattisgarh	Chhattisgarh Police Radio Organisation
6	Goa	Goa Police Communication and Wireless Section
7	Gujarat	Gujarat Police Wireless Department
8	Haryana	Haryana Police Telecommunication
9	Himachal Pradesh	Himachal Pradesh Directorate of Police Telecommunication
10	Jharkhand	Jharkhand Police Wireless Department
11	Karnataka	Karnataka Police Wireless Department
12	Kerala	Kerala Police Telecommunication
13	Madhya Pradesh	MP Police Telecommunications Cell
14	Maharashtra	Maharashtra Police Wireless Department
15	Manipur	Manipur Police Telecommunication Organisation
16	Meghalaya	Meghalaya Police Radio Organisation
17	Mizoram	Mizoram Police Radio Organisation
18	Nagaland	Nagaland Police Telecommunications Organisation
19	Odisha	Odisha Police Communication Wing
20	Punjab	Punjab Police Information Technology & Telecommunication
21	Rajasthan	Rajasthan Police Telecommunication Branch
22	Sikkim	Sikkim Police Communication Branch
23	Tamil Nadu	Tamil Nadu Police Telecommunication Wing
24	Telangana	Telangana Police Communication
25	Tripura	Tripura Police Communication Wing
26	Uttar Pradesh	Uttar Pradesh Police Telecommunication
27	Uttarakhand	Uttarakhand Police Telecommunication
28	West Bengal	West Bengal Police Telecommunication • Kolkata Police Wireless Branch
29	Andaman & Nicobar Islands	Andaman and Nicobar Police Communications Department
30	Chandigarh	Chandigarh Police Telecommunication
31	Dadra & Nagar Haveli & Daman & Diu	
32	Delhi	Delhi Police Police Telecommunication
33	Jammu & Kashmir	Jammu and Kashmir Police Telecommunication
34	Ladakh	
35	Lakshadweep	Lakshadweep Police Wireless Branch
36	Puducherry	Puducherry Police Wireless Branch

=== State/UT Crime Records Bureau ===
At the National Level, National Crime Records Bureau was set up. At the State Level, State Crime Records Bureau was set up under the CID of the State Police. At the District Level, District Crime Records Bureau(s) were also set up in States under the SCRBs.

At the UT Level, UT Crime Records Bureau was set up under the CID of the UT Police. At the District Level, District Crime Records Bureau(s) were also set up in UTs under the UTCRBs.

=== List of Technical Services ===
Sr No	State/UT	Sr No.	Technical Services
1	Andhra Pradesh	A	Andhra Pradesh State Crime Records Bureau
1	Andhra Pradesh	B	AP Police Computer Centre
1	Andhra Pradesh	C	AP Forensic Science Laboratory (FSL)
1	Andhra Pradesh	D	AP Finger Print Bureau (FPB)
2	Arunachal Pradesh	A	Arunachal Pradesh SCRB
3	Assam	A	Assam SCRB
3	Assam	B	Assam Police Computer Centre
3	Assam	C	Assam Forensic Science Laboratory (FSL)
3	Assam	D	Finger Print Bureau (FPB)
4	Bihar	A	Bihar SCRB
4	Bihar	B	Bihar Forensic Science Laboratory
5	Chhattisgarh	A	Chhattisgarh SCRB
5	Chhattisgarh	B	Chhattisgarh Forensic Science Laboratory
6	Goa	A	Goa SCRB
6	Goa	B	Goa Forensic Science Laboratory
7	Gujarat	A	Gujarat SCRB
7	Gujarat	B	Gujarat Forensic Science Laboratory
8	Haryana	A	Haryana SCRB
8	Haryana	B	Haryana FSL
8	Haryana	C	Haryana FPB
9	Himachal Pradesh	A	Himachal Pradesh SCRB
10	Jharkhand	A	Jharkhand SCRB
10	Jharkhand	B	Jharkhand FSL
11	Karnataka	A	Karnataka SCRB
11	Karnataka	B	Karnataka Police Computer Centre
11	Karnataka	C	Karnataka Forensic Science Laboratory (FSL)
11	Karnataka	D	Karnataka Finger Print Bureau (FPB)
12	Kerala	A	State Crime Records Bureau (SCRB), Kerala
12	Kerala	B	Information and Communication Technology (ICT) Wing
12	Kerala	C	Kerala Forensic Science Laboratory (FSL)
12	Kerala	D	Kerala Finger Print Bureau (FPB)
12	Kerala	E	Police Photographic Bureau
12	Kerala	F	Police Telecommunication
13	Madhya Pradesh	A	Madhya Pradesh SCRB
13	Madhya Pradesh	B	MP FSL
14	Maharashtra	A	Maharashtra SCRB
14	Maharashtra	B	Maharashtra Police Computer Centre
14	Maharashtra	C	Maharashtra Forensic Science Laboratory (FSL)
14	Maharashtra	D	Maharashtra Finger Print Bureau (FPB)
15	Manipur	A	Manipur SCRB
15	Manipur	B	Manipur FSL
16	Meghalaya	A	Meghalaya SCRB
16	Meghalaya	B	Meghalaya FSL
17	Mizoram	A	Mizoram SCRB
17	Mizoram	B	Meghalaya FSL
18	Nagaland	A	Nagaland SCRB
18	Nagaland	B	Nagaland FSL
19	Odisha	A	Odisha SCRB
19	Odisha	B	Police Computer Centre
19	Odisha	C	Forensic Science Laboratory (FSL)
19	Odisha	D	Finger Print Bureau (FPB)
20	Punjab	A	Punjab SCRB
20	Punjab	B	Punjab FSL
21	Rajasthan	A	Rajasthan SCRB
21	Rajasthan	B	Rajasthan FSL
22	Sikkim	A	Sikkim SCRB
23	Tamil Nadu	A	Tamil Nadu SCRB
23	Tamil Nadu	B	Tamil Nadu Police Computer Wing
23	Tamil Nadu	C	Forensic Science Laboratory
23	Tamil Nadu	D	Finger Print Bureau
24	Telangana	A	Telangana SCRB
24	Telangana	B	Police Computer Centre
24	Telangana	C	Forensic Science Laboratory (FSL)
24	Telangana	D	Finger Print Bureau (FPB)
25	Tripura	A	Tripura SCRB
26	Uttar Pradesh	A	Uttar Pradesh SCRB
26	Uttar Pradesh	B	UP Police Computer Centre (UPPCC)
26	Uttar Pradesh	C	Forensic Science Laboratory (FSL)
26	Uttar Pradesh	D	Finger Print Bureau (FPB)
27	Uttarakhand	A	Uttarakhand SCRB
28	West Bengal	A	West Bengal SCRB
28	West Bengal	B	West Bengal FSL
28	West Bengal	C	West Bengal FPB
29	Andaman and Nicobar Islands	A	Andaman and Nicobar CRB
30	Chandigarh	A	Chandigarh Crime Records Bureau
31	Dadra and Nagar Haveli and Daman and Diu		
32	Delhi	A	Delhi Crime Records Bureau
33	Jammu and Kashmir	A	J&K Crime Records Bureau
33	Jammu and Kashmir	B	J&K FSL
34	Ladakh		
35	Lakshadweep		
36	Puducherry	A	Puducherry Crime Records Bureau
36	Puducherry	B	Puducherry FSL
36	Puducherry	C	Puducherry FPB

== Anti-Corruption Agencies (Vigilance) ==
List of Anti-Corruption Agencies
Sr No.	State/UT	Anti-Corruption Agency
1	Andhra Pradesh	Andhra Pradesh Anti-Corruption Bureau
2	Arunachal Pradesh	
3	Assam	Directorate of Vigilance & Anti-Corruption, Assam
4	Bihar	
5	Chhattisgarh	Anti-Corruption Bureau, Chhattisgarh
6	Goa	Goa Police Anti-Corruption Branch
7	Gujarat	Gujarat Anti-Corruption Bureau
8	Haryana	Haryana State Vigilance Bureau
9	Himachal Pradesh	Himachal Pradesh State Vigilance & Anti-Corruption Bureau
10	Jharkhand	Anti-Corruption Bureau, Jharkhand
11	Karnataka	Anti-Corruption Bureau, Karnataka
12	Kerala	Vigilance & Anti-Corruption Bureau, Kerala (VACB)
13	Madhya Pradesh	Lokayukta Special Police Establishment, Madhya Pradesh
14	Maharashtra	Maharashtra Anti-Corruption Bureau
15	Manipur	Vigilance & Anti-Corruption Department, Manipur
16	Meghalaya	Meghalaya Police Anti-Corruption Branch
17	Mizoram	Anti-Corruption Bureau, Mizoram
18	Nagaland	Directorate of Vigilance & Anti-Corruption Police, Nagaland
19	Odisha	Odisha Vigilance Directorate
20	Punjab	Punjab State Vigilance Bureau
21	Rajasthan	Anti-Corruption Bureau, Rajasthan
22	Sikkim	Vigilance Police Department, Sikkim
23	Tamil Nadu	Directorate of Vigilance & Anti-Corruption, Tamil Nadu
24	Telangana	Telangana Anti-Corruption Bureau
25	Tripura	
26	Uttar Pradesh	Anti-Corruption Organisation, Uttar Pradesh
27	Uttarakhand	
28	West Bengal	Directorate of Anti-Corruption Branch, West Bengal
29	Delhi	Delhi Police Vigilance Department

== Home Guard, Civil Defence ==
=== Home Guards ===
Police in the States and UTs are assisted by units of volunteer Home Guards under guidelines formulated by the Ministry of Home Affairs, Government of India.

=== List of Volunteer forces ===
Sr No.	State	Civil Defence / Home Guards
1	Andhra Pradesh	
2	Arunachal Pradesh	
3	Assam	Assam Civil Defence & Home Guards
4	Bihar	Bihar Home Guards
5	Chhattisgarh	Chhattisgarh Home Guard & Civil Defence
6	Goa	Goa Home Guard & Civil Defence
7	Gujarat	
8	Haryana	Haryana Home Guards & Civil Defence
9	Himachal Pradesh	
10	Jharkhand	
11	Karnataka	Home Guards & Civil Defence Department, Karnataka
12	Kerala	Kerala Civil Defence; Kerala Home Guards
13	Madhya Pradesh	
14	Maharashtra	Maharashtra Home Guards
15	Manipur	
16	Meghalaya	Directorate of Civil Defence & Home Guards, Meghalaya
17	Mizoram	Directorate of Civil Defence & Home Guards, Mizoram
18	Nagaland	Directorate of Civil Defence & Home Guards, Nagaland
19	Odisha	Directorate General of Home Guards & Civil Defence, Odisha
20	Punjab	Punjab Home Guards & Civil Defence
21	Rajasthan	Rajasthan Home Guard
22	Sikkim	
23	Tamil Nadu	
24	Telangana	
25	Tripura	
26	Uttar Pradesh	Uttar Pradesh Home Guard
27	Uttarakhand	
28	West Bengal	
29	Andaman and Nicobar Islands	
30	Chandigarh	
31	Dadra and Nagar Haveli and Daman and Diu	
32	Delhi NCT	DG Home Guards, Delhi
33	Jammu and Kashmir	J&K Civil Defence, Home Guard
34	Ladakh	
35	Lakshadweep	
36	Puducherry	

== State Disaster Response Forces ==
=== State Disaster Response Force(SDRF) ===
The National Policy on Disaster Management 2009 requires the state governments in India to raise their own forces for rapid disaster response. As a result, following SDRF Units has been created So far.

=== List of State Disaster Response Forces (SDRF) ===
Sr No.	State	SDRF
1	Andhra Pradesh	Andhra Pradesh SDRF
2	Arunachal Pradesh	Arunachal Pradesh SDRF
3	Assam	Assam SDRF
4	Bihar	Bihar SDRF
5	Chhattisgarh	Chhattisgarh SDRF
6	Goa	Goa SDRF
7	Gujarat	Gujarat SDRF
8	Haryana	Haryana SDRF
9	Himachal Pradesh	Himachal Pradesh SDRF
10	Jharkhand	Jharkhand SDRF
11	Karnataka	Karnataka SDRF
12	Kerala	Kerala SDRF
13	Madhya Pradesh	Madhya Pradesh SDRF
14	Maharashtra	Maharashtra SDRF
15	Manipur	Manipur SDRF
16	Meghalaya	Meghalaya SDRF
17	Mizoram	Mizoram SDRF
18	Nagaland	Nagaland SDRF
19	Odisha	Odisha DRAF
20	Punjab	Punjab SDRF
21	Rajasthan	Rajasthan SDRF
22	Sikkim	Sikkim SDRF
23	Tamil Nadu	Tamil Nadu SDRF
24	Telangana	Telangana SDRF
25	Tripura	Tripura SDRF
26	Uttar Pradesh	Uttar Pradesh SDRF
27	Uttarakhand	Uttarakhand SDRF
28	West Bengal	West Bengal DMG

== See also ==
- Commissioner of Police (India)
- Crime in India
- Law enforcement in India
- Police ranks and insignia of India
