= SDRF =

SDRF may refer to:

- Sample and Data Relationship Format
- Shanghai Development Research Foundation
- State Disaster Response Force in Indian states, e.g.
  - State Disaster Response Force (Assam)
  - State Disaster Response Force (Himachal Pradesh)
  - State Disaster Response Force (Uttar Pradesh)
  - State Disaster Response Force (Uttarakhand)
