= Hashimpura massacre =

1987 mass killing of Muslim youths by police in Meerut, Uttar Pradesh, India

The Hashimpura massacre was the killing of 42 men by police on or around 22 May 1987 near Meerut in Uttar Pradesh state, India, during the 1987 Meerut communal riots. Around 19+ personnel of the Provincial Armed Constabulary rounded up 42 youths from the Hashimpura mohalla (locality) of the city, took them to the outskirts of the city, shot them in cold blood and dumped their bodies in a nearby irrigation canal. A few days later, the dead bodies were found floating in the canal and a case of murder was registered. Eventually, 19 personnel of the provincial constabulary were accused of committing the massacre. In May 2000, 16 of the 19 accused surrendered and were later released on bail. The other three accused died in the intervening period. In 2002, the Supreme Court of India ordered that the case trial should be transferred from the Ghaziabad district court to a Sessions Court at the Tis Hazari court complex in Delhi.

On 21 March 2015, all 16 men accused in the Hashimpura massacre case of 1987 were acquitted by Delhi High Court due to insufficient evidence. The Court emphasized that the survivors could not recognize any of the accused PAC personnel. On 31 October 2018, the Delhi High Court convicted the 16 men and sentenced them to life imprisonment, overturning the trial court's verdict.

== The incident ==
"We were sorted out on the basis of our strength and physique, while elders and children were picked up and set free. The youth were grouped together and put in a yellow PAC truck. ”.."was pulled out of the truck, shot at twice and thrown into the Ganga stream".

— Mohamad Usman, prosecution witness and survivor, 2007

After communal riots began in Meerut in April 1987, in a communally charged atmosphere, the Provincial Armed Constabulary (PAC) was called in, but was withdrawn as the riots subsided. However, violence erupted again around 19 May, when 10 people were killed as arson escalated, thus the Army was called out to stage a flag march. Seven companies of CRPF reached the city during the day, while 30 companies of PAC were being rushed in and an indefinite curfew was declared. The following day, mobs burned down Gulmarg cinema hall, and as the death toll rose to 22, plus 75 injured, shoot-at-sight orders were issued on 20 May 1987.

On the night of 22 May 1987, 19 PAC personnel, under platoon commander Surinder Pal Singh, rounded up Muslims in the Hashimpur mohalla in Meerut. The old and the children were later separated and let go. They reportedly took about 40–45 of them, mostly day wage labourers and weavers, in a truck to the Upper Ganga canal in Murad Nagar, Ghaziabad district instead of taking them to the police station. Here some were shot, one by one, and thrown into the canal. A bullet also injured one of the PAC constables. After some were killed, the headlights of passing vehicles made PAC personnel flee the spot with those alive. Four of those shot escaped by pretending to be dead and then swimming away. One of them filed a first information report (FIR) at the Murad Nagar Police Station.

The remaining men were taken in the truck to the Hindon River Canal near Makanpur village in Ghaziabad, shot and their bodies thrown into the canal. Here again, two of the people who were shot at, survived and lodged an FIR at the Link Road Police Station.

== Aftermath ==
As the news of the incident spread across the media, minority rights organisations and human rights organisations voiced their outrage. Prime Minister Rajiv Gandhi visited the city and the riot-affected areas on 30 May along with Chief Minister Vir Bahadur Singh. The human rights body, People's Union for Civil Liberties(PUCL), appointed an investigation committee comprising the then PUCL President, (former Justice) Rajindar Sachar, I. K. Gujral (who later became Prime Minister of India), and others, and the committee brought out its report on 23 June 1987.

In 1988, the Government of Uttar Pradesh ordered an inquiry by the Crime Branch Central Investigation Department (CBCID) of Uttar Pradesh Police. The three-member official investigation team headed by former auditor general Gian Prakash submitted its report in 1994, though it wasn't made public till 1995, when victims moved the Lucknow Bench of the Allahabad High Court.

During the CB-CID inquiry, Sub-Inspector Virendra Singh, then in charge of the Link Road Police Station, stated that upon receiving information about the incident he headed towards the Hindon Canal, where he saw a PAC truck heading back from the site. When he chased the truck, he saw it enter 41st Vahini camp of the PAC. Vibhuti Narain Rai, Superintendent of Police, Ghaziabad, and Naseem Zaidi, District Magistrate, Ghaziabad, also reached 41st Vahini and tried tracing the truck through senior PAC officers, but to no avail. In its report, the CB-CID Investigating Officer R.S. Vishnoi recommended prosecution of 37 employees of the PAC and the police department, and 1 June 1995, the government gave permission for 19 of them to be prosecuted. Subsequently, on 20 May 1997, Chief Minister Mayawati, gave permission for prosecution of the remaining 18 officials.

== Court case ==
After the inquiry, in 1996, a chargesheet was filed under Section 197 of the Criminal Procedure Code (CrPC) with the Chief Judicial Magistrate (CJM), Ghaziabad who subsequently issued warrants for the accused policemen to appear before the court. Bailable warrants were issued 23 times against them between 1994 and 2000, yet none of them appeared in court. This was followed by non-bailable warrants which were issued 17 times between April 1998 and April 2000, to no avail. Eventually, under public pressure, 16 of the accused surrendered before the Ghaziabad court in 2000, and were subsequently released on bail and were back in service.

In 2001, after an inordinate delay in pre-trial proceedings at Ghaziabad, kin of victims and survivors filed a petition before the Supreme Court for transferring the case from Ghaziabad to New Delhi stating that the conditions there would be more conducive, which the Supreme Court granted in September, 2002. But the case couldn't start, as the state government didn't appoint a Special Public Prosecutor for the case till November 2004, though he was later replaced by S. Adlakha, as the former was found to be under-qualified. Finally, in May 2006, charges were filed against all the accused PAC men for murder, conspiracy to murder, attempt to murder, and tampering with evidence, etc. under Sections 302/ 120B/ 307/ 201/ 149/ 364/ 148/ 147 of the Indian Penal Code, and the trial was scheduled to begin in July.

On 15 July 2006, the day the trial was to begin, it was deferred to 22 July by Additional Sessions Judge N. P. Kaushik of Delhi Sessions Court, after the prosecution said authorities in Uttar Pradesh had yet to send important case material to Delhi. He also issued notices, both to the Chief Secretary and Law Secretary of Uttar Pradesh state, seeking an explanation as to "why this case has not been dealt with appropriately on an urgent basis". Later, when on 22 July, the trials began, and when one of four survivors, Zulfikar Nasser was deposed in front of additional sessions judge N. P. Kaushik at the Tis Hazari, three of the 19 original accused including platoon commander Surender Pal Singh, under whose instructions the massacre was allegedly committed, were already dead. Later on the second day, when the case property was sought by the judge, it was revealed that the rifles used had already been redistributed amongst the jawans of 41-B Vahini Battalion of the PAC (to which the accused belonged), after forensic analysis by CFSL Hyderabad. As per survivor witness Mohamad Usman, who was deposed in February 2007,.."after three boys were pulled out and shot point blank the others in the truck started screaming so the PAC jawans opened fire to quieten them".

By May 2010, 63 of the 161 persons listed as witnesses, by CB-CID of Uttar Pradesh Police which investigated the case, had been examined. On 19 May 2010, 4 witnesses in the case recorded their statements in front of Additional Sessions Judge, Manu Rai Sethi at a Delhi Court. These include Sirajuddin, Abdul Gaffar, Abdul Hamid and the then Officer on Special Duty (OSD) Law and Order G L Sharma. However, none of the eyewitnesses could recognize any of the accused PAC personnel. On 16 October 2012, Janata Party president Subramanian Swamy moved the Delhi court seeking a probe into the alleged role of P. Chidambaram, the Union Minister of State (MoS) for Home Affairs at the time, in the massacre.

Tis Hazari Court, Delhi, on 21 March 2015 acquitted all 16 of the accused in the Hashimpura massacre case of 1987, due to insufficient evidence. The Court emphasized that the survivors could not recognize any of the accused PAC personnel. The Uttar Pradesh Government challenged the order of the trial court in Delhi High Court and appealed the decision. In May 2015, Uttar Pradesh Government announced a compensation of Rs. 5 lakh to family of each victim.

On 31 October 2018, 78-year-old retired police officer Ranvir Singh Vishnoi produced police general diary as critical evidence in the Delhi High Court, which led to the conviction of the 16 personnel of the PAC, who were sentenced to life imprisonment, overturning the trial court's verdict.

== RTI query ==
On 24 May 2007, twenty years after the incident, two survivors and 36 members of victims' families visited Lucknow and filed 615 applications under The Right to Information Act 2005 (RTI), at the office of the Director General of Police seeking information about the case. The inquiry revealed that in September all the accused remained in service, and none had any mention of the incident in their Annual Confidential Report (ACR)s. Five men who were shot and survived, later became witnesses for the prosecution case in 2007.

== See also ==
- List of massacres in India
- List of cases of police brutality in India
