= Uttarakhand Provincial Armed Constabulary =

- Active: 2001
- Country: India
- Agency: Uttarakhand Police
- Type: State Armed Police Force
- Role: Riot control, counterinsurgency operations
- Operations jurisdiction: Uttarakhand
- Headquarters: Haridwar, Uttarakhand
- Abbreviation: UK-PAC

Structure
- Battalions: 31st Battalion; 40th Battalion; 46th Battalion

The Uttarakhand Provincial Armed Constabulary (UK-PAC), or Provincial Armed Constabulary is the state armed police wing of Uttarakhand Police was created in 2001, after the bifurcation of the state of Uttar Pradesh in 2000 that resulted in the formation of new state Uttarakhand.

== History ==
Between 1962 and 1973, four new battalions of Uttar Pradesh Provincial Armed Constabulary were raised from the Garhwali and Kumaoni community. Apart from that, The 46th Battalion called the Task Force existed till 1998, with the special task to fight dacoits and maoist insurgents. On achieving its goal, it was again converted to normal PAC Battalion, presently located at Rudrapur. Currently the Uttarakhand Provincial Armed Constabulary has three battalions off which the 31st and 46th Battalion are based in Rudrapur and 40th Battalion is based in Haridwar.

In 2021, Uttarakhand became the fourth state in India after, Nagaland, Kerala, and West Bengal to have women in their special forces. Most of these women commandos are recruited in Uttarakhand Police Armed Constabulary.

== Organisational structure ==
Command structure	Officer rank
Battalion	Commandant; Deputy Commandant
Company	Assistant Commandant; Subedar
Platoon	Inspector; Sub-Inspector
Section	Constable; Naik

== Recent events ==
The Uttarakhand Provincial Armed Constabulary was deployed to curb the 2024 Haldwani violence.

== See also ==
- Uttarakhand Police
- Uttarakhand Fire and Emergency Services
- State Disaster Response Force (Uttarakhand)
- Central Armed Police Forces
- List of departments of the government of Uttarakhand
