= Uttarakhand Fire and Emergency Services =

Fire and Emergency department in Uttarakhand, India

- उत्तराखण्ड अग्निशमन एवं आपात सेवा

Operational area
- Country: Uttarakhand, India
- Address: Dehradun, Uttarakhand

Agency overview
- Established: 9 November 2000
- Annual calls: 2000–3000
- Employees: 1498
- Annual budget: ₹86.5 Cr
- Commissioner: Deepam Seth, IPS Director General of Uttarakhand Police
- Fire chief: Neeru Garg, IPS, IG Fire Service
- Chief Fire Officer: 9
- EMS level: BLS
- Motto: We Serve to Save

Facilities and equipment
- Stations: 47
- Engines: 205
- Platforms: 1
- Ambulances: 20
- Airport crash: 7
- Aerial Ladder Platforms: 1

Website
- https://ukfireservices.com

The Uttarakhand Fire and Emergency Services is the public service department of the Government of Uttarakhand whose function is to firefighting and emergency services in Uttarakhand. It is responsible for the provision of fire protection and life safety as well as responding to building collapses, drownings, gas leakage, oil spillage, road and rail accidents, bird and animal rescues, fallen trees and taking appropriate action during natural disasters. The department has now 48 fire stations consisting of nearly 1400 executive personnel and nearly 98 ministerial staff. The headquarters the department is situated at Dehradun.

== History ==
Uttarakhand Fire department came into existence with the formation of Uttarakhand state on 9 November 2000. Earlier it had 22 fire stations. Shri Aloke. B. Lal I.P.S was the first Inspector General of Uttarakhand Fire and Emergency Services and Shri. C. K. Chakravarty was the first Chief Fire Officer of Uttarakhand Fire and Emergency Service. Today, Uttarakhand Fire and Emergency service has 48 fire stations/units, including 5 fire stations/unit dedicated to industrial area.

== Organisational structure ==
The head of the department is the Director General (D.G.) who is the rank of the D.G.P., I.P.S. rank. Under this rank is an Inspector General who is the rank of the I.G., I.P.S. and Deputy Inspector General who is the rank of the D.I.G., I.P.S. and at the Headquarters, and a deputy director (Technical) at the Uttarakhand Fire and Emergency Services Headquarters, Dehradun. There are 13 districts, located in Almora, Bageshwar, Chamoli, Champawat, Dehradun, Haridwar, Nainital, Pauri Garhwal, Rudraprayag, Tehri Garhwal, Udham Singh Nagar and Uttarkashi where Chief Fire Officers are in charge. Each district has a Chief Fire Office and under each Chief Fire Officer there are fire stations where a Station Officer serves the station in charge.

At each station, in addition to Fire Station Officer there are Fire Station Second Officer, Leading Firemen, Fire Service Driver, and Firemen.

== Hierarchy ==
Officers

- Director General of Police (DGP) (IPS)
- Inspector General of Police (IG) (IPS) - Fire and Emergency Services
- Deputy Inspector General of Police (DIG) (IPS) - Fire and Emergency Services
- Deputy Director Technical - Fire and Emergency Services
- Chief Fire Officer

Sub-ordinates

- Fire Station Officer (FSO)
- Fire Station Second Officer (FSSO)
- Leading Fireman (LFM) and Fire Service Driver (FsDVR)
- Fireman (FM)

== Fire stations ==
District	Division	Fire Station
Chamoli	Garhwal	1. Badrinath; 2. Gairsain; 3. Gopeshwar; 4. Joshimath
Dehradun	Garhwal	1. Dehradun; 2. Doiwala; 3. Mussoorie; 4. Rishikesh; 5. Selaqui; 6. Tyuni; 7. Vikasnagar
Haridwar	Garhwal	1. Bhagwanpur; 2. Haridwar; 3. Laksar; 4. Roorkee; 5. Roshnabad
Pauri Garhwal	Garhwal	1. Kotdwar; 2. Pauri; 3. Srinagar; 4. Thalisain
Rudraprayag	Garhwal	1. Rudraprayag
Tehri Garhwal	Garhwal	1. Ghansali; 2. Narendranagar; 3. New Tehri
Uttarkashi	Garhwal	1. Barkot; 2. Uttarkashi
Almora	Kumaon	1. Almora; 2. Ranikhet
Bageshwar	Kumaon	1. Bageshwar; 2. Garur; 3. Kapkot
Champawat	Kumaon	1. Lohaghat; 2. Tanakpur
Nainital	Kumaon	1. Haldwani; 2. Nainital; 3. Ramnagar
Pithoragarh	Kumaon	1. Dharchula; 2. Didihat; 3. Pithoragarh
Udham Singh Nagar	Kumaon	1. Bajpur; 2. Jaspur; 3. Kashipur; 4. Khatima; 5. Kichha; 6. Pantnagar; 7. Rudrapur; 8.Sitarganj

== Women in fire service ==
The department has started to appoint a woman Firefighter in the State since 2021. The Smt Kiran Joshi is a first female Firefighter as a Fireman (FireWomen) in Uttarakhand Fire Service.

== Mission ==
- To protect people's life and property from fire and other accidents.
- To protect communities from all possible hazards by providing progressive high quality emergency services and preventive measures.
- To carry out effective and timely fire fighting, rescue and life saving operations and Disaster Management activities and thereby ensure maximum performance and render remarkable service to the public.
- Develop well organized and trained Fire & Rescue Services so that human resources of the department measure up to multiple challenges of a Fire & Rescue Service.

== Vision ==
- Dedicated and best community focused Fire & Rescue Services ensuring a safe and secure environment for all.
- To honor the trust of the society by demonstrating commitment to deliver professional Fire Fighting & Rescue Services activities with compassion, respect, and utmost courtesy.
- To ensure community safety by creating basic awareness regarding fire safety, life safety and Disaster Management among the people and thereby mitigate the fire loss and improve effective and timely rescue and life saving activities.
- Minimize the response time in urban and rural areas by increasing the number of Fire & Rescue Stations and mobility profile of the department.

== Services ==
- 24 hour emergency support
- Consultation in case of fire and life safety
- Fire safety Certificate
- Public awareness program/Mock drills
- Fire safety to all sensitive places of state
- Fire safety in all VIP/VVIP program
- Training programs
- Disaster search, rescue and relief work

== See also ==
- Uttarakhand Police
- Uttarakhand Provincial Armed Constabulary
- State Disaster Response Force (Uttarakhand)
- List of departments of the government of Uttarakhand
