= State Disaster Response Force (Uttarakhand) =

Indian specialised force

State Disaster Response Force Uttarakhand
- SDRF Uttarakhand उत्तराखंड राज्य आपदा प्रतिक्रिया बल

Agency overview
- Formed: 2014; 12 years ago
- Jurisdiction: Government of Uttarakhand
- Headquarters: Dehradun, Uttarakhand
- Motto: Mitratā Sevā Surakṣā Friendship, Service, Protection
- Minister responsible: Pushkar Singh Dhami, Chief Minister
- Agency executive: Abhinav Kumar, IPS, Director General of Uttarakhand Police
- Parent department: Uttarakhand Police , Department of Home Affairs, Government of Uttarakhand
- Website: https://usdma.uk.gov.in

State Disaster Response Force Uttarakhand or SDRF Uttarakhand is a specialised force of the Uttarakhand Police charged with conducting search and rescue operations.

== History ==
On October 9, 2013, a mandate was issued for the formation of the State Disaster Response Force Uttarakhand and approval was given for the formation of two companies. In February 2014, deputation was done on the basis of merit from the Civil Police, PAC, IRB, Wireless, Fire Service and other ancillary branches. For the first 'A' and 'B' company, 152 police personnel/officers were trained at centers of the National Disaster Response Force, Patna, Bhatinda, Ghaziabad and SDRF Uttarakhand (State Disaster Response Force) was formed in the month of March 2014.

== Selection and training ==
The SDRF Uttarakhand attracted personnel from other sections of the police department. The force is seen as a desirable destination for members of the force due to the proximity of its headquarters to health, education, and housing facilities.

Young officers are generally selected for service. The Supply of manpower for SDRF Uttarakhand is done from State Civil Police, Armed Police, PAC, IRB, Fire Service, Wireless and other ancillary branches of Uttarakhand Police to be taken on deputation on the basis of physical fitness and merit for a maximum period of five years. The deputation period with SDRF is intended to enable the personnel to work as first responders and is meant to increase the overall capability of police department in disaster management.

Training consists of a six-week period with the National Disaster Response Force at Bhatinda, Patna, Gajiabad Battalion. The Uttarakhand government has already approved the proposal of creating a high tech SDRF Training centre in Dehradun, After completion it will become the First high Tech SDRF Training centre in India.

The personnel deputed for the Uttarakhand SDRF were provided training by the NDRF on Medical First Responder (MRF), Collapse Structure Search and Rescue (CSSR), Rope rescue, Flood rescue and Chemical Biological Radiological Nuclear (CBRN). Apart from this, the SDRF teams equipped with Dog squads were also trained in relief, search and rescue techniques aimed at conducting operations in earthquake affected and damaged buildings using effective and scientific methods.

== Achievements ==
In 2014, a total of 17 operations were conducted by SDRF Uttarakhand in the various districts of Uttarakhand.

Twenty-one members of the force scaled Mount Bhagirathi II and hoisted the national flag in 2015. It was the first operation by the SDRF Uttarakhand Police Mountain Commanding Team, the first of its kind in India. Mountain Bhagirathi II or Bhagirathi Parbat II is located in the Gangotri region in Uttarkashi district of the state of Uttarakhand.

On May 18, 2017, 17 members of the high altitude rescue team of SDRF were sent to Mt. Satopthi. The team climbed Mt. Satopthi on 10 June 2017 and became the first police rescue team to reach the peak.

On March 29, 2018, 15 members of the force left for Mount Everest on a mission. During the journey of about 55 days, the team climbed Lobache East Peak, Kala Pathar Peak and In the last phase, on May 20 and 21, eight members hoisted the Indian flag on Sagarmatha peak. The SDRF Uttarakhand became the first state police of the country to scale Mt. Everest.

The SDRF team began an expedition on September 9, 2021, and after overcoming several challenges on the way, hoisted the Indian flag at the mountain's peak on September 29, 2021. SDRF Uttarakhand is first from Uttarakhand police to have successfully scaled this mountain. The team was led by a female officer.

== See also ==
- Uttarakhand Police
- Uttarakhand Provincial Armed Constabulary
- Uttarakhand Fire and Emergency Services
- National Disaster Response Force
- List of departments of the government of Uttarakhand
