= 1987 Meerut riots =

1987 Hindu-Muslim violence in Meerut, Uttar Pradesh, India

The 1987 Meerut riots were a series of violent communal disturbances between Hindus and Muslims in the northern Uttar Pradesh town Meerut which occurred from March to June 1987, which resulted in the death of more than 350 people. Nearly half of that number was made up of almost 180 Muslims from Hashimpura and Maliana who were killed by members of the UP Provincial Armed Constabulary in actions after the initial rioting.

== Background ==
Meerut had been the site of five serious communal clashes over the prior two decades, the most significant being in December 1982, that saw the deployment of the PAC and its alleged involvement in the violence that resulted in a reported 150 dead.

The tension started in 1986 when the Babri Masjid in Ayodhya was re-opened by the Government, but also allowed Hindus to pray in the mosque due to their claim that it was the former site of a temple to Rama, a major Hindu deity. Hindus argued that the temple had been demolished in c. 1528 A.D. and the mosque had been erected in its place. Indian Muslims rejected the claim as lacking evidence; they organized a rally held in March 1987 by the All India Babri Masjid Action Committee, which led to counter-rallies by Hindus and led to inflamed hostilities.

The tension broke on 14 April 1987 during a local fair, when an on-duty police officer was struck by a firecracker and opened fire, killing two Muslims. On the same day in Hashimpura, a clash broke out when local Muslims objected to a Hindu family playing film music over loudspeakers during a sermon at the nearby mosque. A shot was fired by a Hindu local, and some Muslims retaliated by setting shops on fire, resulting in street brawls. The PAC was called in to quell the chaos but withdrew in the first week of May, barely 10 days before the riots broke out. On May 14, two bombs exploded in Mohalla Chhipiwara and Chhatta Tagi Hussain, followed by another explosion in Mohalla Kainchian two days later.

== Violence ==
On the evening of May 16, a Hindu named Ajay Sharma was shot and killed, apparently in a renter-owner land dispute. Various rumours ascribing a communal aspect to the killing would spread in the next two days, further worsening tensions. Local police and a contingent of the PAC attempted to arrest a suspect in Hashimpura two days later, while an iftar gathering for the Islamic holy month of Ramadan was being held at the nearby Imliyan Mosque. The timing of the raid was seen as provocative and resulted in Muslim residents clashing with police. According to People's Union for Civil Liberties, a Muslim girl was crushed under a police jeep. The police then fired into the crowd, killing several people.

On the morning of May 17th, at least 15 people were killed, and hundreds of businesses were burnt along the neighborhoods of Golekuan, Pilokheri, Lakhipura, and Shyam Nagar. In Pilokhari specifically, several cloth printing factories owned by Hindus were torched, with a dozen people inside the factories killed. At Lisari Road, the farm of a local Hindu, Nepal Singh, was attacked. A car was also attacked by a Muslim mob, killing a Hindu doctor.

A curfew was introduced and the army deployed by the afternoon, but the violence continued, spreading to areas like Shastri Nagar, where at least 33 people were killed. Prison riots broke out in Meerut and Fatehgarh, resulting in 5 and 6-7 deaths respectively.

As the riots spread to Modinagar, Hindus and local police engaged in pogroms and riots against Muslims and business owned by their community. Eight people were killed in neighboring Delhi during a spillover. Many Muslims were burnt by a Hindu mob in villages on the outskirts of Meerut city, resulting in the destruction of over five hundred million rupees in property. Hindu and Muslim doctors were harassed and threatened by mobs of their own community for treating patients not of their faith. In the subsequent days, numerous people died in further communal violence, two in a shootout and four in a bomb blast at Bulandshahar, while another blast in Hapur did not claim any lives. Prohibitory orders were enforced in 36 districts, and a complete ban on public meetings was imposed throughout the state. Despite this, many witnesses reported the police were complicit in facilitating more violence.

On the afternoon of May 19th, a Hindu mob retaliated for the earlier property damage by a Muslim mob, allegedly with PAC protection. Affected areas included Hapur Road, the Mawana bus stand, stadium, Shastri Nagar, and Miyan Mohammed Nagar where hundreds of homes of mostly poor Muslims were destroyed. The residents alleged that the PAC opened fire at 2 p.m. and then started looting and burning property themselves, killing dozens of people. On the night of the 19th, three people on a roof in Subash Nagar were killed in firing, allegedly from the direction of Hashimpura.

In the coming days, fifty gazetted police officers and more than sixty companies of the PAC, the Central Reserve Police Force (CRPF) and the Army had to control the riots. In many cases, members of the local police and PAC engaged in unprovoked killings and supported Hindu rioters, particularly in two infamous cases. On May 22 in the neighborhood of Hashimpura, PAC officials were charged for filling buses with Muslims taken from their homes and killing 75 of them, dumping the corpses in two canals outside the city. In the aftermath of the events, Meerut Bar Association President Anil Bakshi, claimed "Innocent people were framed by the state administration to save the policemen guilty of the massacre."

Although the fighting died down by the end of May, violence continued to simmer for months afterwards, with individual killings, assaults and vandalism punctuated by more serious incidents. On July 15, a bomb blast at Bazaza Bazaar killed three, resulting in mobs assembling within two hours and clashing with police at half a dozen points across the city. A week later on July 22nd, a mob on the Meerut-Bijnor road stopped four buses and lynched eleven Muslim passengers. According to Senior Superintendent of Police, G.L. Sharma, the massacre may have been caused by rumors of Muslims abducting devotees during the ongoing Shivaratri celebrations.

== Trials and 2018 verdict ==
In September 2018, the Delhi High Court reserved its verdict in the case. One month later, the Delhi High Court convicted 16 former PAC personnel for life after finding them guilty of the murder of 42 people.
