= Sample and Data Relationship Format =

The Sample and Data Relationship Format (SDRF) is a tab-delimited file describing the relationships between samples and data in fields such as genomics and proteomcs. The format originated as part of the MAGE-TAB standard for communicating the results of microarray investigations, including all information required for MIAME compliance. It was later extended to, and is currently primarily used for, next generation sequencing and proteomics.

For simple experimental designs, constructing the SDRF file is straightforward, and even complex loop designs can be expressed in this format. In practise, tools such as lesSDRF are often used to annotate experimental metadata in SDRF.
