= Lakshadweep Police =

Indian law enforcement agency

Lakshdweep Police
- Logo of Lakshdweep Police
- Abbreviation: LP
- Motto: सत्यम सेवा संरक्षणम (Truth Service Protection)

Jurisdictional structure
- Operations jurisdiction: Lakshadweep, India
- Lakshdweep Police area within India
- Area: 32.62 km2 (12.59 sq mi)
- Population: 70,365
- Legal jurisdiction: Lakshadweep
- Governing body: Ministry of Home Affairs, Government of India
- General nature: Local civilian police

Operational structure
- Headquarters: Kavaratti
- Minister responsible: Shri Amit Shah, Minister of Home Affairs (India)
- Agency executives: Praful Khoda Patel, Administrator & Ex-Officio Inspector General of Police; Sharat Kumar Sinha, IPS, Deputy inspector general of police
- Parent agency: Government of India

Website
- lakshadweeppolice.gov.in

The Lakshadweep Police is the law enforcement agency for the union territory of Lakshadweep, India.

== Organizational structure ==
Lakshadweep Police comes under direct control of the Department of Home Affairs, Government of Lakshadweep. The Lakshadweep Police is headed by the Inspector General of Police (IGP). The administrator of Lakshadweep is the ex-officio Inspector General of Police of Lakshadweep Police.

=== Hierarchy ===
- Administrator & Ex-Officio IGP
- Deputy inspector general of police (DIG)
- Superintendent of police (SP)
- Deputy superintendent of police (DySP)
- Circle Inspector of Police (CI)
- Sub Inspector of police (SI)
- Assistant Sub Inspector of Police (ASI)
- Head constable (HC)
- Police constable (PC)

== See also ==
- Kerala Police
