= State Armed Police Forces =

Indian police units

The State Armed Police Forces of India are the police units established for dealing with serious law and order situations requiring a higher level of armed expertise than normal. The State Armed Police Forces exist in addition to the ordinary police services of the various states.

The various States have different titles for their armed police units. In addition to the general term "Armed Police", other titles in different states include Special Armed Police, Armed Constabulary, Provincial Armed Constabulary and State Military Police. Although the titles are different, their organisation, weapons, equipment and tasks are broadly the same. The central government of India now refers to these forces nationwide as the State Armed Police Forces and discourages use of the term "paramilitary". However, this terminology does not necessarily coincide with the existing terminology of the states of India; For example, the state of Bihar calls its state armed police force "Military Police", which clashes with central government definitions of "military" and "paramilitary". It is not yet clear whether such discrepancies will be resolved.

The State Armed Police act as a mobile armed reserve activated only on the orders from the Deputy inspector general of police or above. They are not usually in contact with the public except during public events, civil unrest, and natural disasters. They maintain key guard posts and participate in antiterrorist operations. Depending on the type of assignment, they may be or may not be carrying firearms.

Within states, each police district may maintain its own teams of policemen with higher firearms competence. Such teams, known as "District Armed Police or District Armed Reserve", are for purely local use led by commandant or deputy commandant, functions under the respective district police chiefs.

The State Armed Police Forces are headed by an Additional Director General of Police, who is the controlling authority and assisted by Inspectors General of police, Deputy Inspectors general of police, with the overall control of Director General of Police & State Police Chief. The SAPFs are typically organized into battalions or companies, each battalion is commanded by a "Commandant" of the rank of Superintendent of Police. The commandant is assisted by deputy commandants and assistant commandants. The structure of SAPFs are vary from state to state. The normal structure is given below;

== Structure of State Armed Police Forces ==
The Armed Police battalions in the State will be led by an officer holding the rank of Additional Director General of Police. This officer will be responsible for the administration, training, operational preparedness, and welfare of personnel across all armed police units in the State. They will operate under the overall guidance and supervision of the Director General of Police (Head of the Police Force).

A Commandant, equivalent in rank to Superintendent of Police, shall head each Armed Police Battalion. The Commandant may be assisted by a Second-in-Command also known as Deputy Commandant, equivalent in rank to Additional Superintendent of Police. Each Battalion may be divided into appropriate number of Companies and a Headquarters Company, each of which will be headed by an Assistant Commandant, equivalent in rank to Deputy Superintendent of Police.

=== Hierarchy of State Armed Police Forces ===
- Director General of Police
- Additional Director General of Police
- Inspector General of Police
- Deputy Inspector General of Police
- Commandant (equivalent to the rank of SP)
- Deputy Commandant/Second-in command (equivalent to the rank of Addl.SP)
- Assistant Commandant (equivalent to the rank of DySP)
- Armed Police Inspector
- Armed Police Sub Inspector
- Armed Police Assistant Sub Inspector
- Havildar/Head constable
- Armed Police Constable

== Functions and duties ==
- To assist the district police in maintenance of law and order.
- To guard vulnerable points and vital installations.
- VIP security: to provide escorts, static guards, and gunmen to threatened persons.
- To perform bank security duties.
- To perform elections, law and order duties in other states.
- To provide force for duties such as celebration of festivals/fairs and special operations against anti-social/terrorist elements.
- Disaster management - natural & manmade.
- To perform out of state duty whenever desired by the government.

== Bihar Special Armed Police ==
The Bihar Special Armed Police is the state armed police force for the Bihar Police with headquarters at Patna led by CAPFs officer on deputation. It is frequently involved in clashes with Maoist rebels. The force has been expanded since 2006 to deal with the Maoist insurgency. It has 16 Battalions with approximately 1,000 personnel in each, from BSAP 1 to BSAP 16.

BSAP1 Gorkha Battalion is a Reserved Battalion mainly compromising of Indian domiciled Gorkhas. They are used for high level security duties, protecting the governor and others. Its headquarters is in Patna with nearly 1,500 serving personnel. BSAP 16 is a battalion recruiting only retired Indian Army soldiers.

== Chhattisgarh Armed Police ==
- Special Task Force was raised in the year 2007 for battling Maoist insurgents in Chhattisgarh. Headquartered in Baghera of Durg district, the force has hubs coming up in the districts of Kanker, Sukma, Bijapur and Bastar.
- District Reserve Guard was formed by recruiting local tribal boys to counter the Naxals.
  - Danteshwari Ladake, women commando unit of District Reserve Guard.
  - Bastar Fighter Force.

== Haryana Armed Police ==
Haryana Armed Police, headquartered at Madhuban, is the state armed police force of Haryana Police for Haryana state. It has five battalions, each with a sanctioned strength of 903 headcount. Three battalions are based at Madhuban, one in Ambala and one in Hisar. On 1 November 1966, six armed battalions were transferred to Haryana from Punjab, four were absorbed into Border Security Force and Central Reserve Police Force, and two remained with Haryana. The Haryana Armed Police includes the State Police Band.

- 1st Battalion Haryana Armed Police, Ambala, transferred to Haryana in 1966 at the time of formation of Haryana.
- 2nd Battalion Haryana Armed Police, Madhuban, transferred in 1966.
- 3rd Battalion Haryana Armed Police, Hisar, raised in 1969.
- 4th Battalion Haryana Armed Police, Madhuban, raised on 14 Sept 1973, includes Mounted Armed Police (90 headcount).
- 5th Battalion Haryana Armed Police, Madhuban.

== Jharkhand Armed Police ==
Jharkhand Armed Police was created to counter Naxalism in the state led by IPS officer on deputation.

== Karnataka State Reserve Police ==
In Karnataka, the state armed police of wing of Karnataka Police trace their origins to the erstwhile Mysore State Imperial Service led by CAPF officers on deputation.

The armed police of Karnataka are led by CAPFs officer on deputation:

- District Armed Reserve for each district
- City Armed Reserve in the four commissionerates in the State namely Bengaluru, Mysuru, Mangaluru and Hubli-Dharwad
- Special Task Force
- Karnataka Armed Reserve Mounted Police - headquarters at Mysuru
- Coastal Security Police
- Government Railway Police

The Karnataka State Reserve Police is headed by an officer of the rank of additional director general of police, who is assisted by an inspector general and two deputy inspectors general of police at the police headquarters. The Karnataka State Reserve Police (KSRP) consists of Twelve (12) battalions as on August 2026 A.D.. Four Battalions have their headquarters at Bengaluru and one each at Mysuru, Belagavi, Kalaburgi, [[Mangaluru]] (7th) , [[Shivamogga]] (8th) , Shiggavi (10th0, Hassan and Tumukuru.

Training Schools:

- Karnataka State Reserve Police Training School, Munirabad.
- Armed Police Training School, Bengaluru.

The Coastal Security Police was established in the year 1999. The wing is headed by an officer of the rank of Inspector General of Police, followed by Superintendent of Police & other staff. The CSP exercises jurisdiction over the territorial coastal waters of Karnataka from Talapady in Dakshina Kannada District to Sadashivgad in Uttara Kannada District covering about 320 km.

== Kerala Armed Police ==
In Kerala, the Kerala Armed Police trace their origins to the early stages of the Kerala Police. Armed police battalions act as a reserve force for deployment whenever and wherever the District Police is short of manpower in maintaining law and order, crowd control, and disaster management. There are 11 battalions spread over the state, with a combined strength of 6,755 personnel.

The armed police battalions of Kerala are:

- Malabar Special Police (MSP)
- Kerala Armed Police Battalions (KAP) (numbered I to V)
- Special Armed Police (SAP)
- Rapid Response and Rescue Force (RRRF)
- Kerala Armed Women Police Battalion (KAWPBn)
- India Reserve Battalion (IRBn)
- State Industrial Security Force (SISF)

The "Additional Director General of Police, Armed Police Battalions", is the controlling authority who is assisted by the "Deputy Inspector General of Police, Armed Police Battalions". Each Battalion is under the control of a "Commandant" with the rank of Superintendent of Police (SP).

The Special Armed Police was formed in 1955 by the then Travancore-Cochin government with its headquarters at Thiruvananthapuram. Besides law and order duties in the southern range, Special Armed Police personnel are assigned to guard duties at the Raj Bhavan (Governor's House), Police Headquarters, etc. For the welfare of their personnel, the special armed police have a canteen, a gymnasium, a hospital with lab facilities and a nursery school. At present this battalion has a strength of seven companies.

== Madhya Pradesh Special Armed Police ==
The main objective of Madhya Pradesh Special Armed Police, the state armed wing of Madhya Pradesh Police, is to maintain Law and Order in the state of Madhya Pradesh led by CAPFs officers on deputation. The responsibility of this Special Armed Force to look after the law and arrangement and also to control the areas affected by Naxalites, Social Courtesies, removal of bandits. They are active in Jammu and Kashmir, Punjab and in the States of South in an anti-terrorism role. Other than this they are deployed in the event of natural disasters.

== Mizoram Armed Police ==
The Mizoram Armed Police, is the state armed police wing of Mizoram Police in Mizoram. It consist of three battalions with five Indian Reserve Battalion. All these components make up the Mizoram Armed Police. Each battalion is commanded by a Commandant of rank Superintendent of Police / Deputy Commissioner of Police / Commandant. Each battalion also has a special commando/SWAT unit.

== Odisha Special Armed Police ==
Odisha's state armed police are called the Odisha Special Armed Police. They were formed in 1946 as the Odisha Military Police, and the current name was adopted in 1980. There are currently 8 regular battalions and one reserve battalion. The headquarters of the SAP is at state Police Headquarters in Cuttack. The force is under the general control and direction of the Director General and the Inspector General of Police.

The Odisha Military Police was formed on 1 March 1946 by the Odisha Military Police Act (Odisha Act VII of 1946). Soon after its creation this force had to handle serious situations in places like Bhadrak, Ib, Barang, Rampur, Cuttack etc. Due to strenuous nature of work of the military police and need for more personnel its strength was increased in 1947 and 1948. The strength was further increased with the formation of a Gurkha Military Police unit. On 1 March 1948, after a merging of 27 princely states into the Province of Odisha, there was a re-organisation of the police organisation and the 2nd Battalion of the Odisha Military police was established. This battalion had both Gurkha and Odia companies. While the battalion headquarters was at Dhenkanal, two detachments of this battalion were stationed at Nayagarh and Jharsuguda. Subsequently, other battalions were formed in different parts of the state.

SOG (Special Operations Group) is the Specialist element of the Odisha Police. The SOG was formed in August 2004 on the orders of the Government of Odisha Home office with the objective of neutralising any terrorist, insurgent, extremist or illegal armed groups operating in Odisha. The SOG originally had 462 regular active posts which by 2009 had grown to 1,370 personnel. It does not recruit personnel directly, instead personnel are drawn from various state police units and the assignments are based on tenures with a maximum period of 3 years. It also allows hiring of operatives from the armed forces, central paramilitary forces and police units of other states. Operatives receive training at a special school in Chandaka and also from the Indian army based in Jabalpur. The main role of the SOG is counter-insurgency operations but handling hostage situations and hijackings also come under its responsibility. It works closely with the Special Intelligence Wing of the Odisha Police.

== Punjab Armed Police ==
The Punjab Armed Police is the state armed police wing of Punjab Police. PAP have their headquarters at Jalandhar in Punjab. This is where armed policemen of the Punjab are trained. Before the Border Security Force came into existence, PAP used to protect the most sensitive border of the country common with Pakistan. PAP Jawans have a number of international players in hockey, weight lifting, volleyball, kabaddi, etc. The campus is in a huge area and is complete in itself in the areas of housing, sports grounds, training equipment, halls, schools, hospital, swimming pool etc.

The operational PAP units are:

- 7th Battalion, headquartered at PAP Jalandhar Cantt
- 9th Battalion, headquartered at PAP Amritsar
- 13th Battalion, headquartered at PAP Chandigarh
- 27th Battalion, headquartered at PAP Jalandhar Cantt
- 36th Battalion, headquartered at PAP Bahadurgarh, Patiala
- 75th Battalion, headquartered at PAP Jalandhar Cantt
- 80th Battalion, headquartered at PAP Jalandhar Cantt
- 82nd Battalion, headquartered at PAP Chandigarh

== Rajasthan Armed Constabulary ==
The Rajasthan Armed Constabulary is the state armed police wing of Rajasthan Police in Rajasthan. Soon after the independence, the law and order situation along the newly formed 1070 km India-Pakistan border became a serious problem. Incursions and cattle lifting by Pakistani raiders was a regular feature and it became imperative to put an end to it. In 1949–50, the duty of guarding the border was assigned to the joint forces of the Central Reserve Police Force and the Provincial Armed Constabulary, which continued until 1952.

In 1952, the Government of Rajasthan decided to raise a temporary special force that could not only be deployed along the border but also assist the civil police in combating the armed banditry known as "dacoity". The first headquarters and training centre was established at Bharatpur in 1952 and five battalions were raised from ex-soldiers, police, and from other sources outside Rajasthan. Each battalion consisted of six mobile companies and one company remained at the battalion headquarters. These battalions were then dispatched to the border areas of Sriganganagar, Raisinghnagar, Barmer, and Jaisalmer. One unit was stationed at Ghat Gate, Jaipur to combat dacoity.

The RAC continued as a temporary force until 1958, thereafter it was made permanent. In 1962, two companies were drawn from each unit, and the 6th Battalion was formed. From that year up to the late 1970s, more battalions of RAC were raised as demanded by the situation. India saw two wars with Pakistan and one with China and there was unrest in Jammu and Kashmir, NEFA, as well as Mizoram. RAC battalions were dispatched to these sensitive areas and earned accolades for their courage and efficiency. Later, seven of these RAC battalions were merged into the Indian Border Security Force and two into the Central Reserve Police Force.

The RAC has formed various specialist units along with its regular battalions.

In 1998, a Special Task Force, along the lines of the Rapid Action Force of C.R.P.F., was formed to maintain peace in the sensitive districts of Rajasthan. These companies are trained and fully equipped to handle mass riots.

The training imparted to the select RAC companies is decided as per requirements. There are 3 companies of RAC, which have drawn expert swimmers from various R.A.C. battalions and are being trained for flood relief work.

There are currently fifteen battalions of RAC including one special battalion formed of only female Constables called the Hadi Rani Mahila Battalion and one further battalion of MBC held as the States para-military force. Out of the 14 regular battalions of RAC, 11 battalions are deployed in Rajasthan while 3 are deployed to Delhi.

=== All units ===
- First Battalion-Jodhpur
- Second Battalion- Kota
- Third Battalion-Bikaner
- Fourth Battalion-Jaipur
- Fifth Battalion-Jaipur
- Sixth Battalion-Dholpur
- Seventh Battalion-Bharatpur
- Eighth Battalion-Delhi
- Ninth Battalion-Tonk
- Tenth Battalion-Bikaner
- Eleventh Battalion-Delhi
- Twelfth Battalion-Delhi
- Thirteenth Battalion-Jail Security
- Fourteenth Battalion-Bharatpur

=== Special battalions ===
- Hadi Rani Mahila Ballation-Ajmer
- Mewar Bhil Corps-Khairwara
- State Disaster Response Force-Nareli, Ajmer
- Mewar Bhil Corps II-Banswara
- Maharana pratap battalion-Pratapgarh

== Uttar Pradesh Provincial Armed Constabulary ==
In Uttar Pradesh, the Provincial Armed Constabulary or Pradeshik Armed Constabulary is an armed reserve force maintained at key locations across the state and active only on orders from the deputy inspector general and higher-level authorities. UPPAC consists of several battalions located in different cities across the state as a wing of Uttar Pradesh Police. Each battalion has seven to eight companies consisting of 150 to 200 Jawans headed by Commandant. It is usually assigned to VIP protection duties or to maintain order and assist during fairs, festivals, athletic events, elections, and natural disasters. They are also deployed to quell outbreaks of student or labor unrest, organized crime, and communal riots; to maintain key guard posts; and to participate in anti-terrorist operations. The Provincial Armed Constabulary usually carries only lathis and Light Machine Gun. The UPPAC is headed by the Director General Provincial Armed Constabulary. UPPAC was established in 1952 before that it was known as the United Provinces Military Force or Uttar Pradesh Military Force. In the Year 1952 UPPAC came into existence with its current name. UPPAC has pretty good firepower in terms of weapons or strength. In UP there are Three zones of the UPPAC. Western Zone, Central Zone, and Eastern Zone. Each Zone Headed by ADG/IG.

There are almost 30-35 Battalion in UP. in different locations.

== Uttarakhand Provincial Armed Constabulary ==
The Uttarakhand Provincial Armed Constabulary, the state armed police wing of Uttarakhand Police was created in 2001, after the bifurcation of the state of Uttar Pradesh in 2000 that resulted in the formation of new state Uttarakhand.

In 1962–73, four new battalions of UPPAC were raised from the Garhwali and Kumaoni community. Apart from that, The 46th Battalion called the Task Force existed till 1998, with the special task to fight Dacoits and Insurgents. On achieving its goal, it was again converted to normal PAC Battalion, presently located at Rudrapur.

== West Bengal Armed Police Forces ==
The state of West Bengal has the most extensive armed police organisation and structure in the country. Unlike other states of India, the state of West Bengal has two separate police jurisdictions, that of the West Bengal Police, and that of the Kolkata Police Force. It therefore has two separate state armed police structures, one for each jurisdiction.

Special forces of West Bengal are:

- STRACO Force
- Counter Insurgency Force
- Commando Force

=== Eastern Frontier Rifles ===
The Eastern Frontier Rifles is one of the state armed police force for the West Bengal Police, the other being the West Bengal Armed Police. (i.e. as opposed to the police in Kolkata).

==== History ====
The Eastern Frontier Rifles were founded as the Frontier Protection Force by the East India Company at some point in the second half of the 18th century, and have had their current title since 1920. The Eastern Frontier Rifles fought in the Second World War, and, as the Bengal Military Police, in the First World War.

- 18th century: Founded as Frontier Protection Force.
- 1795: Renamed Ramgarh Local Battalion
- 1861: Renamed Frontier Guards
- 1891: Renamed Bengal Military Police, modernised, & given up-to-date weaponry (NB: An unrelated unit had previously used the same title)
- 1920: Reorganised and renamed Eastern Frontier Rifles
- 1947: The force was split between the Indian state of West Bengal, and Pakistan. The Pakistani part became the East Pakistan Rifles, which became the Bangladesh Rifles when Bangladesh became independent, and Border Guards Bangladesh in 2010. The West Bengal part retained its title of Eastern Frontier Rifles.

==== Recent events ====
Many contingents of the Eastern Frontier Rifles are kept deployed in various disturbed areas of the state. However, in recent years the force has been used for day-to-day law and order duties. Their headquarters is at Salua, near Kharagpur.

Like the armed police forces of many states, the Eastern Frontier Rifles are currently challenged with the Naxalite insurgency. In February 2010 an Eastern Frontier Rifles camp called Silda was attacked and burnt down by Maoist rebels, resulting in 24 riflemen killed out of a detachment of about fifty. This resulted in condemnation of the state government by the unit's Special Inspector General, Benoy Chakraborty, who claimed his force was "mis-used" and "ill-treated". Morale in the force is believed to be low.

=== Kolkata Armed Police ===
The Kolkata Armed Police are West Bengal's state armed police force for operations in Kolkata. It is part of the Kolkata Police Force and consists of eight battalions, one special unit- Rapid Action Force (Kolkata Police), Rapid Action Force are deployed for riot suppression and Mass Public Order Activities

== Firearms ==
The Indian Ordnance Factories controlled by the Ordnance Factories Board, Ministry of Defence, Government of India are the sole suppliers of firearms to all the State Armed Police Forces.

- INSAS rifle in 5.56mm NATO in various configurations.
- M4 Carbine purchased under Police Modernisation scheme.
- Beretta 92 pistol purchased under Police Modernisation scheme.
- Sako TRG limited quantity purchased under Police Modernisation scheme.
- AK 47: mostly Bulgarian.
- AKM: modernised version of AK – 47 Assault Rifles.
- Pistol Auto 9mm 1A.
- Bren LMG: Indian version chambering 7.62 NATO rounds.
- Sterling submachine gun: Indian version.
- SLR: Indian version of FN FAL.
- Apart from this, Mizoram Armed Police also use a large number of firearms captured from militants including the G3 rifle, M16 rifle, Dragunov sniper rifle etc.

== See also ==
- Law enforcement in India
- Indian Penal Code
- Indian Police Service
- State Police Services
- Central Armed Police Forces
- Paramilitary forces of India
