= Uttarakhand Police =

State Police Of Uttarakhand, India

Uttarakhand Police उत्तराखंड पुलिस
- Emblem of the Uttarakhand Police
- Abbreviation: UKP
- Motto: Karm Satyam Shauryam; Duty, Truth, Courage

Agency overview
- Formed: 9 November 2000
- Annual budget: ₹3,348 crore (US$360 million) (2026–27 est.)

Jurisdictional structure
- Operations jurisdiction: Uttarakhand, IN
- Map of Uttarakhand Police's jurisdiction
- Governing body: Government of Uttarakhand
- General nature: Local civilian police

Operational structure
- Headquarters: Dehradun, Uttarakhand
- Elected officer responsible: Pushkar Singh Dhami, Chief Minister of Uttarakhand
- Agency executive: Deepam Seth,IPS, Director General of Police
- Parent agency: Department of Home Affairs, Government of Uttarakhand

Website
- uttarakhandpolice.uk.gov.in

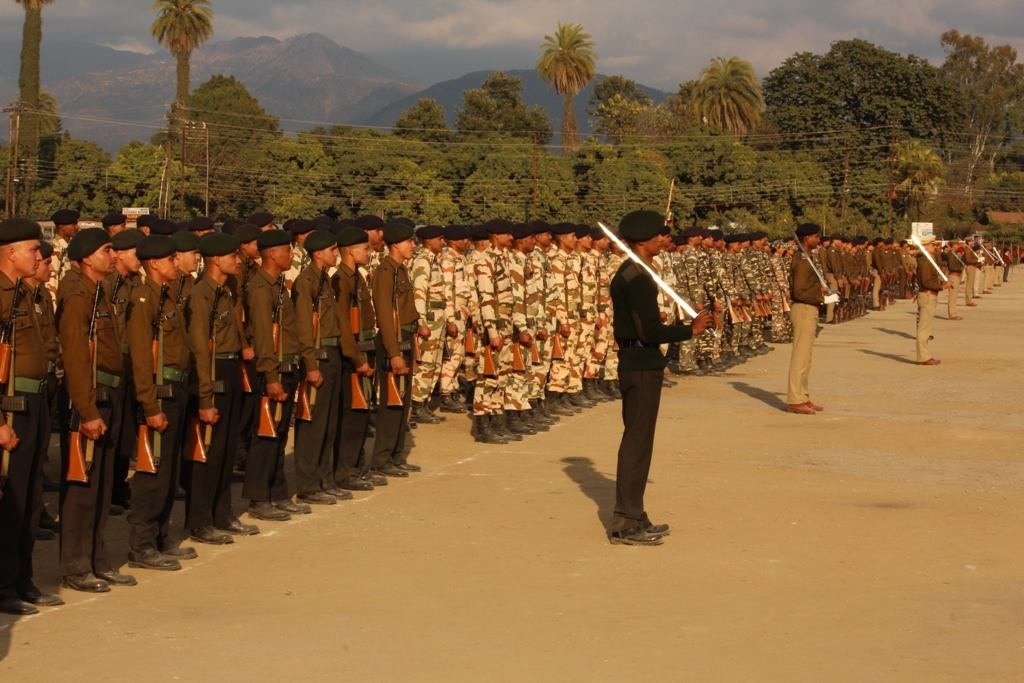
Uttarakhand and Dehradun Police, Republic Day Preparations 2015

The Uttarakhand Police is the law enforcement agency for the state of Uttarakhand in India. It was formed in 2000.

Uttarakhand Police Constable Notification 2024: The Uttarakhand Subordinate Selection Commission (UKSSSC) has published an official notification for the selection of Constables in the Uttarakhand Police Department on a direct recruitment basis.

== Controversies ==
Uttarakhand Police faced significant criticism in the investigation of the Ankita Bhandari murder case due to initial delays in filing the missing person's report, and action was only taken after pressure from the media and the public in September 2022. The controversy intensified when structures at the resort, including the crime scene, were demolished on the orders of local authorities before a thorough forensic examination could be conducted, leading to allegations of tampering with evidence. Further allegations of protecting "VIP" individuals connected to BJP leaders fueled protests and demands for a CBI investigation, although the courts upheld the Special Investigation Team's (SIT) chargesheet.

== Organisational structure ==
Uttarakhand Police comes under the direct control of Department of Home Affairs, Government of Uttarakhand. The Uttarakhand Police is headed by the Director General of Police (DGP).

== Hierarchy ==
Officers

- Director General of Police (DGP) (IPS)
- Additional Director General of Police (ADG) (IPS)
- Inspector General of Police (IG) (IPS)
- Deputy Inspector General of Police (DIG) (IPS)
- Senior Superintendent of Police (SSP) (IPS)
- Superintendent of Police (SP) (IPS)
- Additional Superintendent of Police (Addl. SP) (UPS)
- Assistant Superintendent of Police (ASP) or Deputy Superintendent of Police (DSP) (UPS)

Sub-ordinates

- Inspector of Police
- Sub-Inspector of Police (SI)
- Assistant Sub-Inspector of Police (ASI)
- Head Constable (HC)
- Senior Constable (SC)
- Constable

== List of directors general of the Uttarakhand Police ==
The Director General of Police (DGP) is the head of the Uttarakhand Police.

No.	Name	Tenure	
1	Ashok Kant Sharan	9 November 2000	30 April 2002
2	Prem Dutt Raturi	30 April 2002	15 June 2004
3	Kanchan Chaudhary Bhattacharya	15 June 2004	31 Oct 2007
4	Subhash Joshi	31 October 2007	15 July 2010
(Acting)	Vijay Raghav Pant	15 July 2010	29 July 2010
5	Jyoti Swaroop Pande	28 July 2010	12 April 2012
6	Vijay Raghav Pant	13 April 2012	30 September 2012
7	Satyavrat Bansal	30 September 2012	30 September 2013
8	Birinder Singh Sidhu	30 September 2013	30 April 2016
9	M. A. Ganapathy	30 April 2016	25 July 2017
10	Anil Raturi	25 July 2017	30 November 2020
11	Ashok Kumar	30 November 2020	30 November 2023
(Acting)	Abhinav Kumar	30 November 2023	24 November 2024
12	Deepam Seth	25 November 2024	Incumbent

== See also ==
- Uttarakhand Provincial Armed Constabulary
- Uttarakhand Fire and Emergency Services
- State Disaster Response Force (Uttarakhand)
- Provincial Police Service (Uttarakhand)
- List of departments of the government of Uttarakhand
- Police forces of the states and union territories of India
- Shaktiman, police horse who later died of injuries suffered while on duty
