= Abhinav Kumar (police officer) =

Director General of Uttrakhand Police

Abhinav Kumar IPS
- Born: 31 August 1973 (age 53); Bareilly, Uttar Pradesh
- Education: The Doon School; Mansfield College, Oxford
- Police career
- Country: India
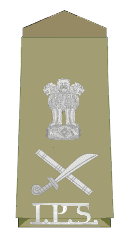
- Rank: Acting Director General of Police (2023–2024)
- Batch: 1996
- Cadre: Uttarakhand
- Awards: Police Medal (PM) for Meritorious Service; President's Police Medal (PPM) for Distinguished Service

Abhinav Kumar (born 31 August 1973) is an Indian Police Service officer and former acting Director General of Police (DGP) of Uttarakhand Police who served from December 2023 until November 2024. He served as acting DGP of the Himalayan state. He is the youngest appointed acting DGP in India at 50.

== Early life and education ==
Kumar was born in Bareilly, Uttar Pradesh, and attended the all-boys boarding The Doon School in Dehradun. He then studied philosophy, politics and economics (PPE) at Mansfield College, Oxford in the University of Oxford in the United Kingdom.

== Indian Police Service career ==
Kumar joined the Indian Police Service in 1996. Before becoming the acting DGP of Uttarakhand, Kumar served as Additional Director General of Police (ADG) in Uttarakhand as well as the Special Principal Secretary to Pushkar Singh Dhami, the Chief Minister of Uttarakhand.

== Awards ==
- Police Medal for Meritorious Service 2012
- President's Police Medal for Distinguished Service 2022
