= Maharashtra Security Force =

Indian government security agency

Maharashtra Security Force महाराष्ट्र सुरक्षा बल
- Logo of the Maharashtra Security Force
- Abbreviation: MSF (मसुब)
- Motto: "Security, Trust"

Jurisdictional structure
- Operations jurisdiction: India
- Governing body: Government of Maharashtra

Operational structure
- Headquarters: Mumbai, India
- Parent agency: Maharashtra State Security Corporation

Website
- http://mahasecurity.gov.in/

Maharashtra Security Force (MSF) is a government security agency in Maharashtra, India, which was established in 2010 under Maharashtra State Security Corporation Act, 2010.

Maharashtra Security Force was established with the purpose to provide better protection and security to the Government of Maharashtra State and Central Government offices, undertakings, employees of all such establishments and public sector undertakings in Maharashtra state.

Maharashtra State Security Corporation (MSSC) is a corporate body, which is headed by an Indian Police Service (IPS) officer of Director General of Police.

== See also ==
- Central Industrial Security Force
- Border Security Force
- National Security Guard
- Maharashtra Security Force
