= Uttar Pradesh Provincial Armed Constabulary =

Armed police force of the Indian state of Uttar Pradesh

Uttar Pradesh Provincial Armed Constabulary (UP-PAC) or Provincial Armed Constabulary (PAC) is an armed police of the Indian state of Uttar Pradesh. It is maintained at key locations across the state and active only on orders from the Deputy Inspector General and higher-level authorities. It is usually assigned to VIP duty or to maintain law and order during fairs, festivals, athletic events, elections, and natural disasters. They are also deployed to quell outbreaks of student or labor unrest, organized crime, and communal riots; to maintain key guard posts; and to participate in antiterrorist operations. The Provincial Armed Constabulary is equipped with INSAS semi automatic guns and usually carries only lathis while controlling the mob during unrests. UP-PAC consists of a total of 20,000 personnel as of 2005, composed of 33 battalions located in different cities across the state as a wing of Uttar Pradesh Police. Each battalion is commanded by a Commanding Officer(CO) who is usually an IPS officer of Senior Superintendent rank, and has seven to eight companies consisting of 120 to 150 Jawans, each company headed by a State Police officer of Inspector rank, who is usually referred to as company commander in the PAC and below company there are 3 platoons consisting of 40-50 Jawans, each platoon is usually headed by a Sub-Inspector rank state police officer. The PAC is headed by the Additional Director General Provincial Armed Constabulary (ADG PAC).

== Awards ==
Mohammad Isa Company Commander of IV Battalion of the UP-PAC stationed at Allahabad was awarded Police Medal for Gallantry on 14 January 1957 for his successful encounter with armed dacoits in a forest near the Kurat village.

== History ==
Following is the summary of events related to UP-PAC:

- 1937–1941: In 1937, a decision was taken to organise a Police force of sanctioned strength of 7,000 personnel to be organised along military lines. The PAC Act stated the aim as an Act to raise an armed force for Law and Order duties, to be organised and drilled on military lines. The first 2 companies were accordingly raised by Colonel Thompson of the 1st Brahmans with the help of Landlords of Deoria and Ballia and from landlord's militias and retired sepoys. The first two companies were raised in 1937 and were paid for entirely by subscription of the landlords and businessmen. 15 battalions of United Provinces Military Police were raised from fresh recruits and retired military jawans between 1937 and 1942, the majority (6 battalions) from Bhumihars and Rajputs from the Eastern part of the State (Poorvanchal), and 5 battalions with Jats and Tyagis from Meerut, Baghpat, Kairana, and Muzaffarnagar mixed with Poorvias; 3 battalions with Lodh and Jats from Agra, Mathura, Aligarh, Hathras and Bulandshahr mixed with Poorvias and Tyagis/Jats both; and 1 battalion raised from Jats, Rajputs and Ahirs of Moradabad, Bareilly, Aonla, Pilibhit, Badaun and Shahjahanpur, mixed with Poorvias. So from the beginning, the martial races and specifically the Bhumihars and Rajputs of Poorvanchal constituted a majority of the composition of the force. Each Battalion had 4 companies and each company was to be headed by a DySP.
- 1948: United Provinces Military Police and United Provinces State Armed Constabulary were amalgamated into the United Provinces Provincial Armed Constabulary by enactment of The U.P. Pradeshik Armed Constabulary Act, 1948 - Uttar Pradesh
- 1950: Renamed to Uttar Pradesh Provincial Armed Constabulary due change of name of state
- 1956: Renamed to Uttar Pradesh Pradeshik Armed Constabulary by enactment of U.P. Act XXX of 1956
- 1962-73: 17 new battalions were raised, mostly from Bhumihars, Rajputs and Yadavs from Poorvanchal and Tyagis and Jats from Meerut, Baghpat, Muzaffarnagar, and Bulandshahr; but also 4 battalions from the Garhwalis and Kumaonis, and martial races (Rajputs, Lodhs, Ahirs, and Gujjars from Agra, Etah, Mainpuri, Etawah, Firozabad and the Bundelkhand region of Jalaun, Jhansi and Auraiya.).

A unit called Special Police Force (SPF) previously existed to operate in cooperation with Indian Army. In the 1990s the SPF was merged into the 9th battalion of the PAC, which is situated in Moradabad.

The 46 Battalion called Task Force existed till 1998 (Jawans use to wear insignia of Tiger on their Uniform's Arms), with the special task to fight Dacoits and Insurgents on achieving its goal was again converted to normal PAC Battalion (Presently located at Rudrapur, under Uttarakhand Provincial Armed Constabulary).

In May 1973, 12 battalions of the UP-PAC revolted and the Army was called in to control. About 30 policemen were killed and hundreds were arrested and dismissed from service. In 1982 two petitions to disband UP-PAC were filed in Supreme Court.

== Allegations related to human rights violations ==
UP-PAC had been alleged to be involved in number of human rights violation cases, including:

- Worsening the situation during 1978 Aligarh riots.
- Massacring more than 150 people during 1980 Moradabad riots
- Instigating communal violence in Meerut in 1982
- Massacring over 40 people, from the Hashimpura mohalla (locality) of the Meerut city in the incidence known as Hashimpura massacre
- Looting the markets in Kanpur while on duty in 2001

== Recent events ==
In 2001 the Maoists looted 14 SLRs from Khoradih UP-PAC camp in Mirzapur.

In November 2004 the Naugharh landmine blast by Maoists in Chandauli district in which naxalites ambushed a police party, killing 17 police officers, 13 UP-PAC jawans and 4 UP-Police constables.

During 2013 North India floods UP-PAC and Army rescue teams shifted 25,000 to 30,000 people to safer places from flooded villages in Uttar Pradesh.

== See also ==
- State Armed Police Forces
