= State Disaster Response Force (Himachal Pradesh) =

Specialized force in Himachal Pradesh, India

State Disaster Response Force Himachal Pradesh
- SDRF Himachal Pradesh

Agency overview
- Formed: 2020; 6 years ago
- Jurisdiction: Government of Himachal Pradesh
- Employees: 183 (As of 2023).
- Minister responsible: Sukhvinder Singh Sukhu, , Chief Minister
- Agency executive: Sanjay Kundu, IPS, Director General of Police
- Parent department: Himachal Pradesh Police , Home Department, Govt of Himachal Pradesh

The State Disaster Response Force Himachal Pradesh, or SDRF Himachal Pradesh, is a Specialised Force of Himachal Pradesh Police formed in 2020 to respond to disasters and emergencies in the state.

== Background ==
The Himachal Pradesh State Disaster Response Force (HPSDRF) was raised from the Police Department Indian Reserve Battalions (IRBs)

The State Government of Himachal Pradesh raised 3 companies of HP SDRF located in Shimla, Mandi, and Kangra and the personals are deputed from Himachal Pradesh Reserve Armed Police Force for 6–7 years and thereafter they will go back to their respective parent department/organization and replaced with another set of personnel.

Recently The SDRF Himachal Pradesh gets its new look as the Chief Minister, Thakur Sukhvinder Singh Sukhu launched new Flag, Logo, and Uniform of the Himachal Pradesh State Disaster Response Force (HP SDRF) and also flagged off 10 Vehicles of SDRF.

== Selection and training ==
The Himachal Pradesh State Disaster Response Force (HPSDRF) plays a crucial role in mitigating and responding to disasters in the state. The force comprises personnel selected from the Himachal Pradesh Police on deputation basis for a period of 7–8 years. After successful completion of their services the personal returned to their parent units and a new set of personals are absorbed in the HPSDRF.

Training Process:

The selected personnel undergo extensive training before they are deployed to the HPSDRF. The training is designed to equip them with the skills and knowledge required to respond to different types of disasters effectively.

As the Personal of SDRF are already trained soldiers they only require to get the technical training for disaster response. The Training of HPSDRF is Conducted by the specialists from National Disaster Response Force

== Deployment ==
The HPSDRF has 3 companies in different parts of the states to respond to disasters. The operational control of HPSDRF is with HPSDMA, Department of revenue and administration and administration control with Himachal Pradesh Police, Home department Himachal Pradesh.

Apart from search and rescue, the HPSDRF personal involved in Law and Order duties, election duties, water patrolling duties, VIP duties, Precautionary Deployment Duty, duty in various events like Manimahesh Yatra, Shrikhand Yatra, Kinnar Kailash Yatra, Festivals etc..

== See also ==
- Himachal Pradesh Police
- National Disaster Response Force
