= List of departments of the government of Uttarakhand =

Overview of government-owned establishments in Uttarakhand, India

Uttarakhand Government Departments

Government Departments overview
- Jurisdiction: Uttarakhand
- Headquarters: Dehradun
- Website: https://uk.gov.in

Uttarakhand Government Departments are the administrative bodies of the Government of Uttarakhand in the Indian state of Uttarakhand. The departments grouped under ministerial portfolios headed by the members of Uttarakhand Council of Ministers.

Uttarakhand has 42 state government departments.

== List of departments ==
No.	Department	Parent ministry	Website
1.	Accountant General Office	Ministry of Finance	http://agua.cag.gov.in
2.	Chief Development Office	Ministry of Planning and Programme Implementation	http://cdodoon.gov.in
3.	Chief Minister's Office	none	http://cm.uk.gov.in
4.	Department of Accounts and Entitlements	Ministry of Finance	http://ae.uk.gov.in
5.	Department of Agriculture	Ministry of Agriculture and Farmers' Welfare	http://agriculture.uk.gov.in
6.	Department of Animal Husbandry	Ministry of Animal Husbandry and Fisheries	http://ahd.uk.gov.in
7.	Department of Audit	Ministry of Home Affairs	http://uttarakhandaudit.uk.gov.in
8.	Department of Budget	Ministry of Finance	http://budget.uk.gov.in
9.	Department of Cane and Sugar Industries Development	Ministry of Agriculture and Farmers' Welfare	http://sugarcane.uk.gov.in
10.	Department of Co-operative	Ministry of Co-operation	http://cooperative.uk.gov.in
11.	Department of Disaster Mitigation and Management	Ministry of Home Affairs	http://dmmc.uk.gov.in
12.	Department of Entertainment Tax	Ministry of Finance	http://enttax.uk.gov.in
13.	Department of Excise	Ministry of Home Affairs	http://excise.uk.gov.in
14.	Department of Firms, Societies and Chits	Ministry of Corporate Affairs	http://society.uk.gov.in
15.	Department of Fisheries	Ministry of Animal Husbandry and Fisheries	http://fisheries.uk.gov.in
16.	Department of Food and Civil Supplies	Ministry of Food Processing and Public Distribution	http://fcs.uk.gov.in
17.	Department of Forest	Ministry of Forest and Environment	http://forest.uk.gov.in
18.	Department of Geology and Mining	Ministry of Mining	http://dgm.uk.gov.in
19.	Department of Health	Ministry of Health and Family Welfare	http://health.uk.gov.in
20.	Department of Higher Education	Ministry of Education	http://he.uk.gov.in
21.	Department of Horticulture	Ministry of Agriculture and Farmers' Welfare	http://shm.uk.gov.in
22.	Department of Information	Ministry of Information and Broadcasting	http://uttarainformation.gov.in
23.	Department of Irrigation	Ministry of Irrigation and Water Resources	https://uttarakhandirrigation.com
24.	Department of Labour	Ministry of Labour and Employment	http://labour.uk.gov.in/
25.	Department of Medical Education	Ministry of Health and Family Welfare	http://medicaleducation.uk.gov.in
26.	Department of Minority Welfare	Ministry of Minority Affairs	http://minoritywelfare.uk.gov.in
27.	Department of Police	Ministry of Home Affairs	http://uttarakhandpolice.uk.gov.in
28.	Department of Prison	Ministry of Home Affairs	http://prison.uk.gov.in/
29.	Department of Public Works	Ministry of Infrastructure Development	http://pwd.uk.gov.in
30.	Department of Personnel and Training	Ministry of Personnel, Public Grievances and Pensions	https://sssc.uk.gov.in/
30.	Department of Rural Engineering Services	Ministry of Rural Development and Panchayati Raj	http://res.uk.gov.in
31.	Department of Sanskrit Education	Ministry of Education	http://sanskriteducation.uk.gov.in/
32.	Department of School Education	Ministry of Education	http://schooleducation.uk.gov.in
33.	Department of Sericulture	Ministry of Animal Husbandry and Fisheries	http://silk.uk.gov.in
34.	Department of Social Welfare	Ministry of Social Justice and Welfare	http://socialwelfare.uk.gov.in/
35.	Department of Sports	Ministry of Sports and Youth Affairs	http://sports.uk.gov.in/
36.	Department of Stamps and Registration	Ministry of Commerce and Industry	http://registration.uk.gov.in
37.	Department of State Programme Management	Ministry of Planning and Programme Implementation	http://spmguttarakhand.uk.gov.in
38.	Department of State Tax	Ministry of Finance	http://comtax.uk.gov.in
39.	Department of Town and Country Planning	Ministry of Infrastructure Development	http://tcp.uk.gov.in
40.	Department of Transport	Ministry of Transport and Civil Aviation	http://transport.uk.gov.in
41.	Department of Vigilance	Ministry of Home Affairs	http://vigilance.uk.gov.in
42.	Department of Women Empowerment and Child Development	Ministry of Women Empowerment and Child Development	http://wecd.uk.gov.in

== See also ==
- Union government ministries of India
- Vinod Prasad Raturi
- List of agencies of the government of Uttarakhand
- Uttarakhand Council of Ministers
- Uttarakhand Gazette
