= Haryana Police =

State police agency in India

Haryana Police Department
- Abbreviation: HP
- Motto: Sewa Suraksha Sahyog

Agency overview
- Formed: 1 November 1996
- Employees: 76,748

Jurisdictional structure
- Operations jurisdiction: Haryana, India
- Map of Haryana Police Department's jurisdiction
- Legal jurisdiction: Haryana
- General nature: Local civilian police

Operational structure
- Headquarters: Sector 6, Panchkula
- Elected officer responsible: Nayab Singh Saini, (Chief Minister of Haryana and Minister of Home)
- Agency executive: Ajay Singhal (IPS), Director General of Police (Additional Charge)

Website
- haryanapoliceonline.gov.in

The Haryana Police Department is the law enforcement agency for the state of Haryana, India. Present DGP of Haryana Police is Ajay Singhal since 1 January 2026. He is an IPS officer of 1992 batch.

== History ==
The Haryana Police were formed when the state of Haryana was established after bifurcation from the state of Punjab on 1 November 1966. The organisation is governed by the "Punjab Police rules" which were framed in 1934; however, the State Government passed its police act in 2008. The same police practices being followed by police organisations in North India. At the time when the state of Haryana was established, the organisation had the responsibility for enforcement of the law in 6 districts and had a strength of 12,165 personnel with Commando wing.

FIR (First Immediate Response) application is an SOS/emergency mobile application that helps its user seek immediate help from Police with a single click of a help button to be used by women, senior citizens and anyone who needs Police help in an emergency. FIR app was launched in Faridabad, Haryana by the Hon. CM Shri Manohar Lal Khattar and Commissioner of Police Faridabad and CEO Haryana Waqf Board Dr. Hanif Qureshi, IPS, on 17 April 2016.

== Organisational structure ==
Haryana Police comes under direct control of Department of Home Affairs, Government of Haryana. The Haryana Police is headed by Home Minister.

State Police Headquarters located in Sector 6, Panchkula. The total headcount of the personnel working in Haryana Police at present is 56,747.

Haryana Armed Police (HAP) has 5 battalions, 3 at Madhuban, one at Hisar and one at Ambala.

Haryana Police has wireless repeater antennae in three locations, at Tosham Hill range in Bhiwani district, Tankri hill in Rewari district and at Sarahan hill in Himachal Pradesh. Police HQ uses Sarahan tower to transmit signals to Tosham Hill. Tosham Hill tower boosts and sends the signal to Tankri Hill. Tosham Hill tower cover the signals area of Bhiwani, Hisar, Fatehabad, Sirsa, Rohtak, Sonipat and Jhajjhar district Police Headquarters. Tankri Hill tower covers the Gurugram, Faridabad, Palwal, Nuh, Rewari, Narnaul and Haryana Bhawan Delhi.

=== Hierarchy ===
Officers

- Director General of Police (DGP)
- Additional Director General of Police (ADGP)
- Inspector General of Police (IGP)
- Deputy Inspector General of Police (DIG)
- Senior Superintendent of Police (SSP)
- Superintendent of Police (SP)
- Additional Superintendent of Police
- Assistant SP (IPS) or Deputy SP (HPS)

Sub-ordinates

- Inspector of Police
- Sub-Inspector of Police (SI)
- Assistant Sub-Inspector of Police (ASI)
- Head Constable (HC)
- Constable (CT)
- SPOs

== Ranks of law enforcement in Haryana ==
Gazetted Officers

Indian Police Service cadre officers rank insignia
Insignia
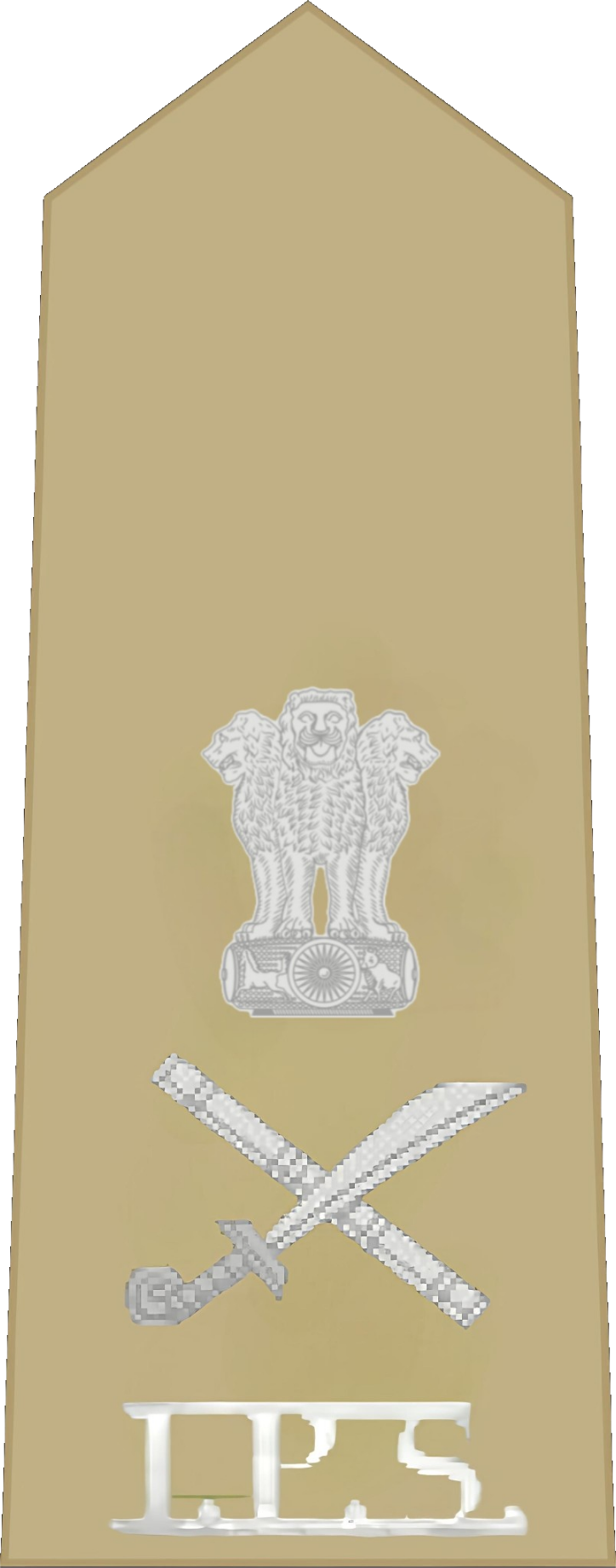
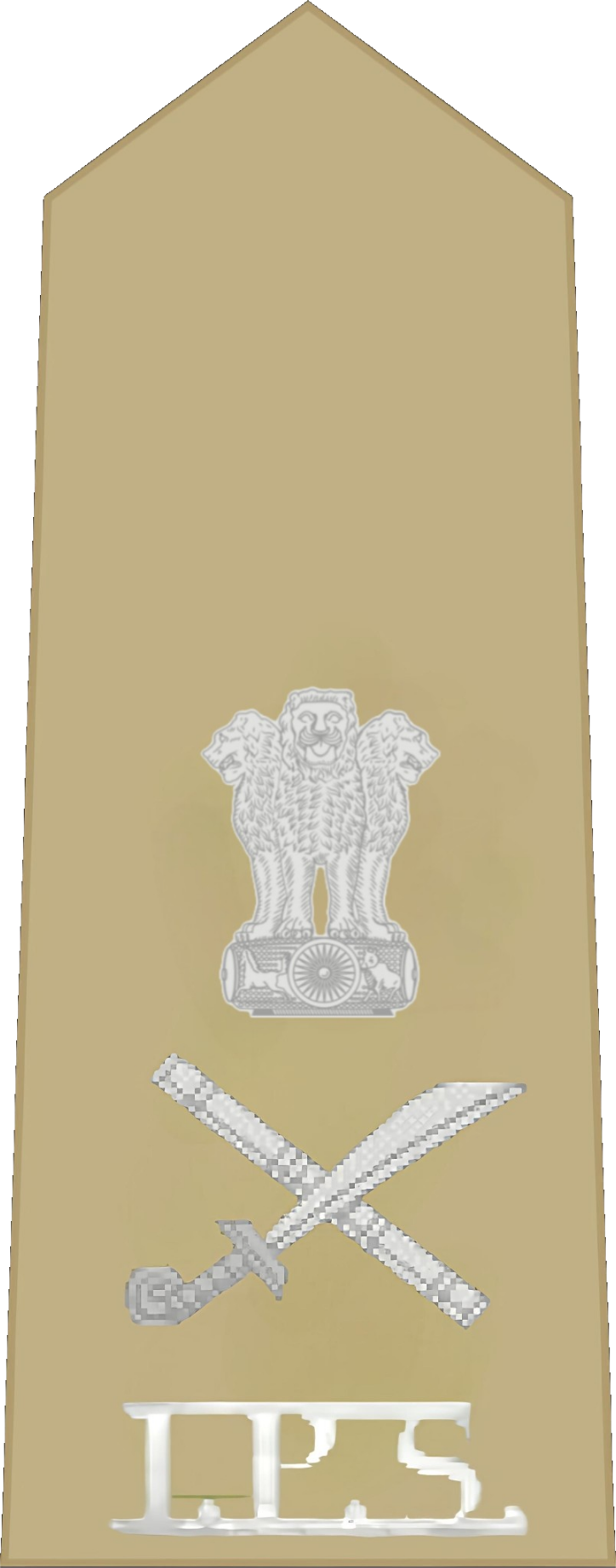
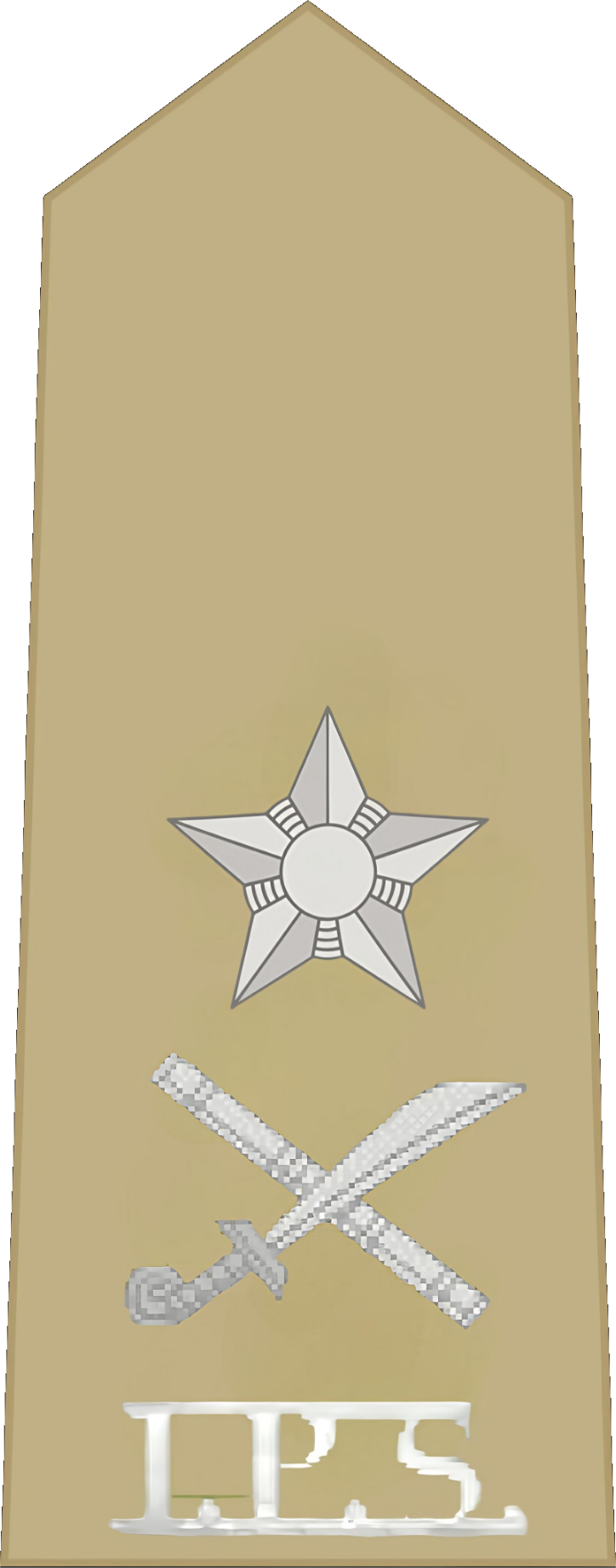
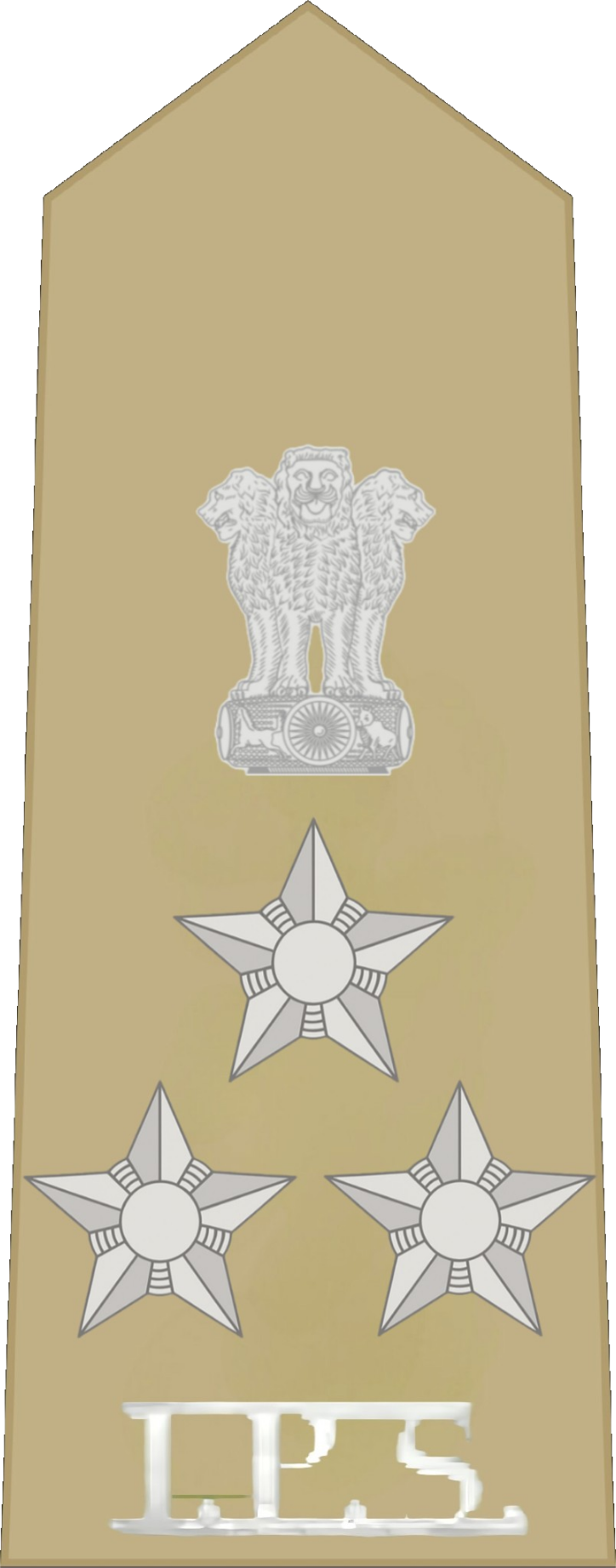
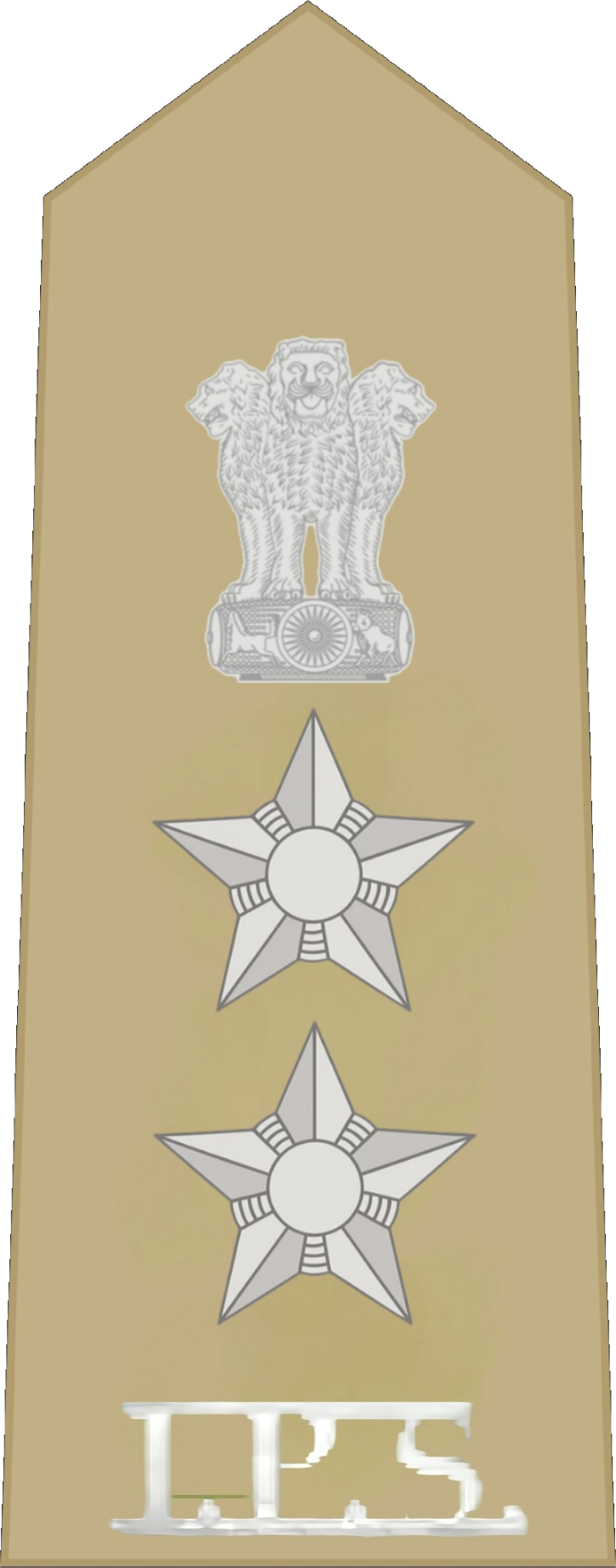
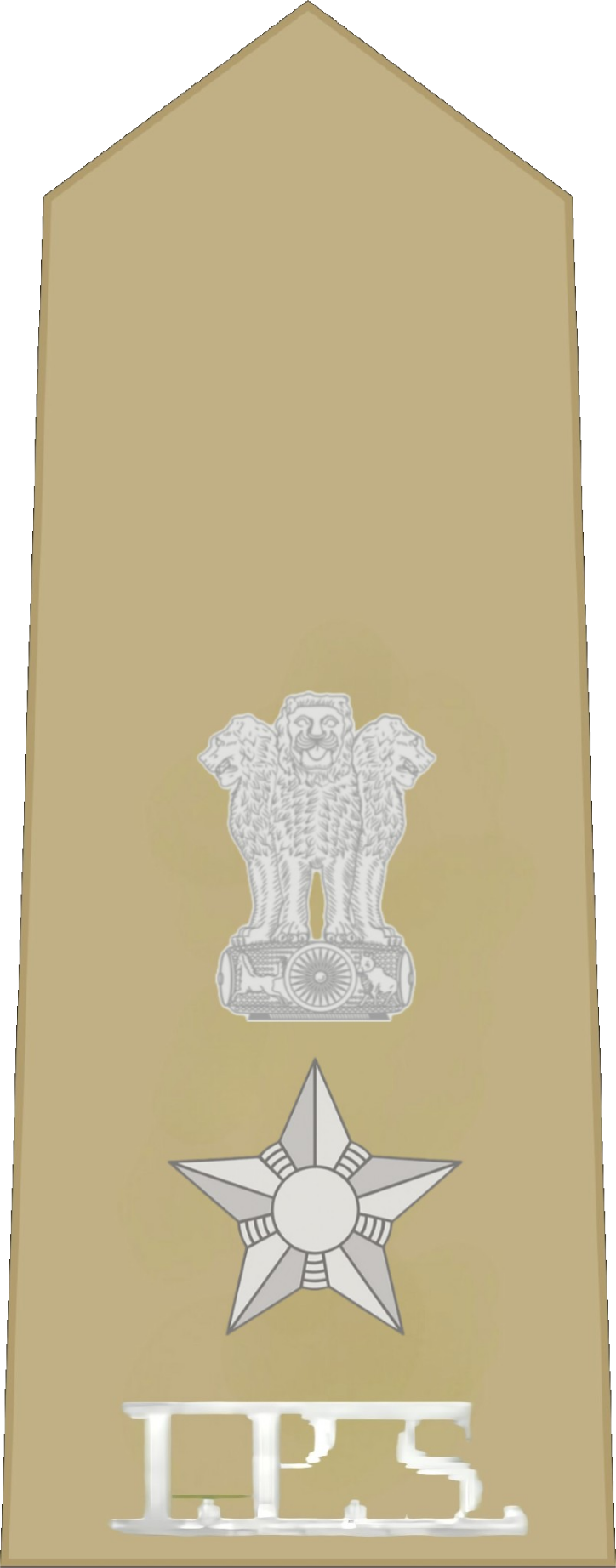
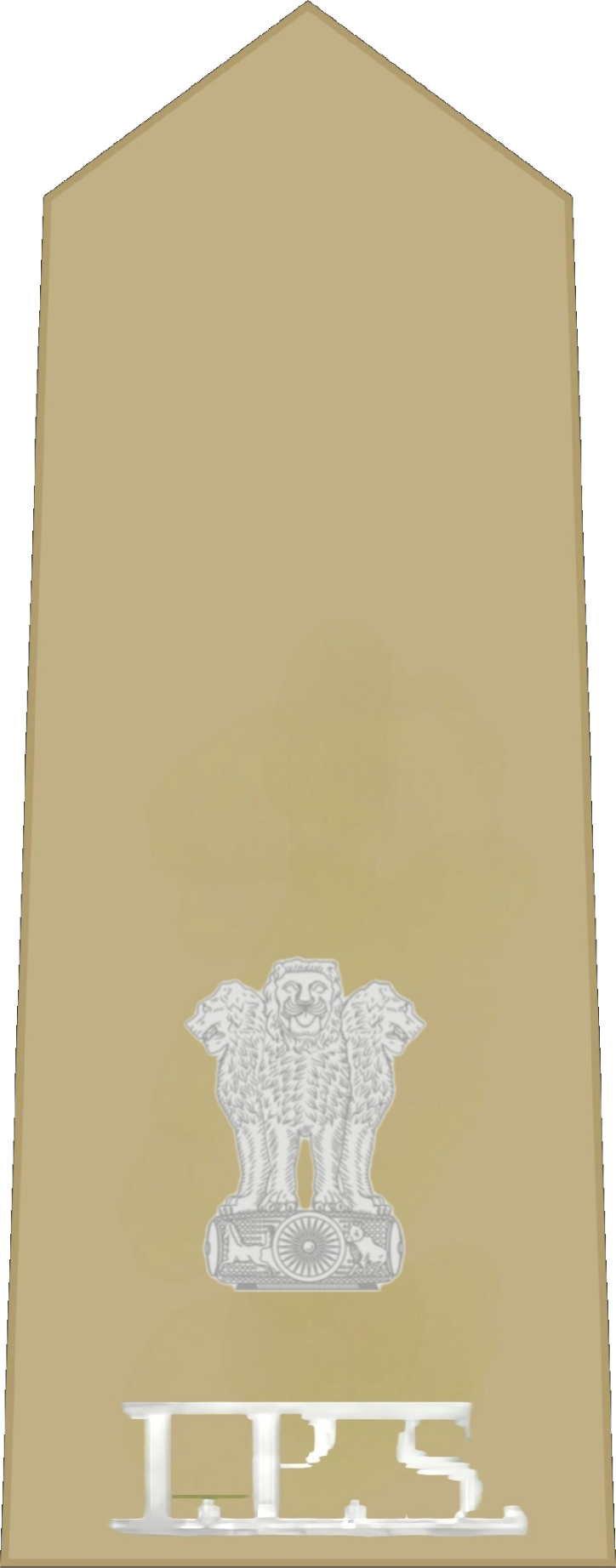
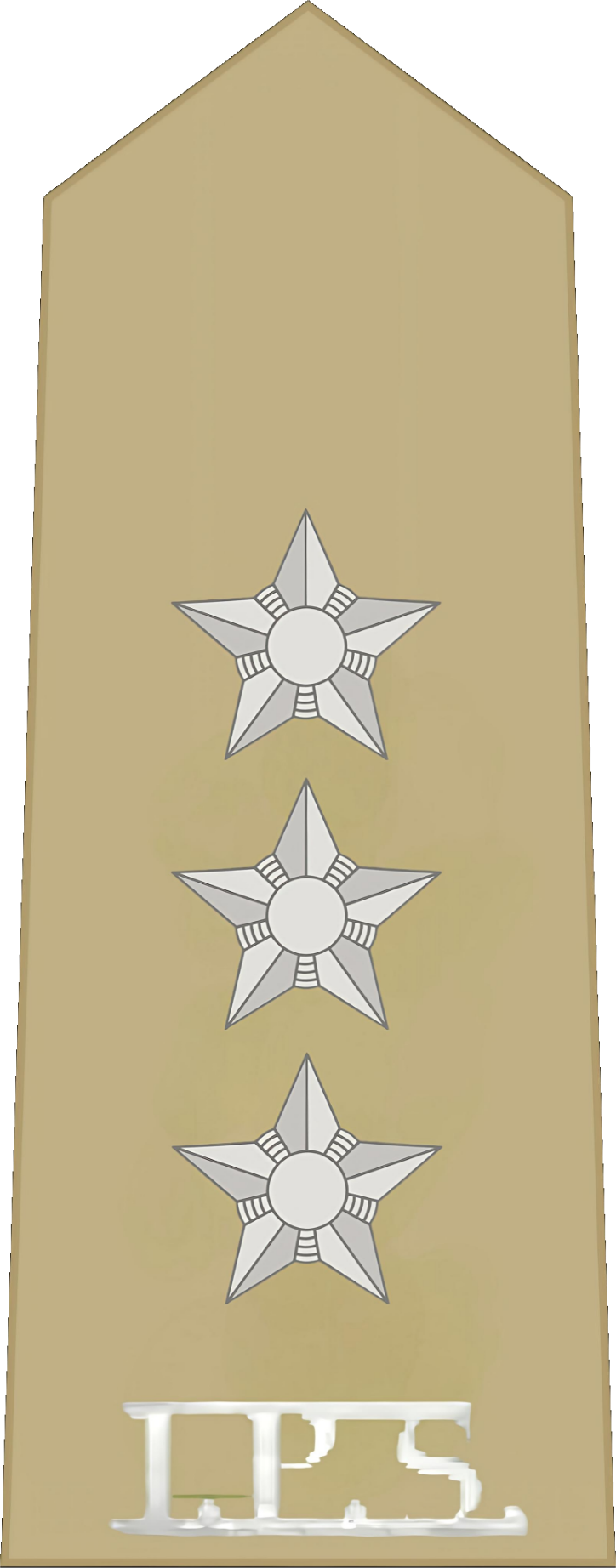
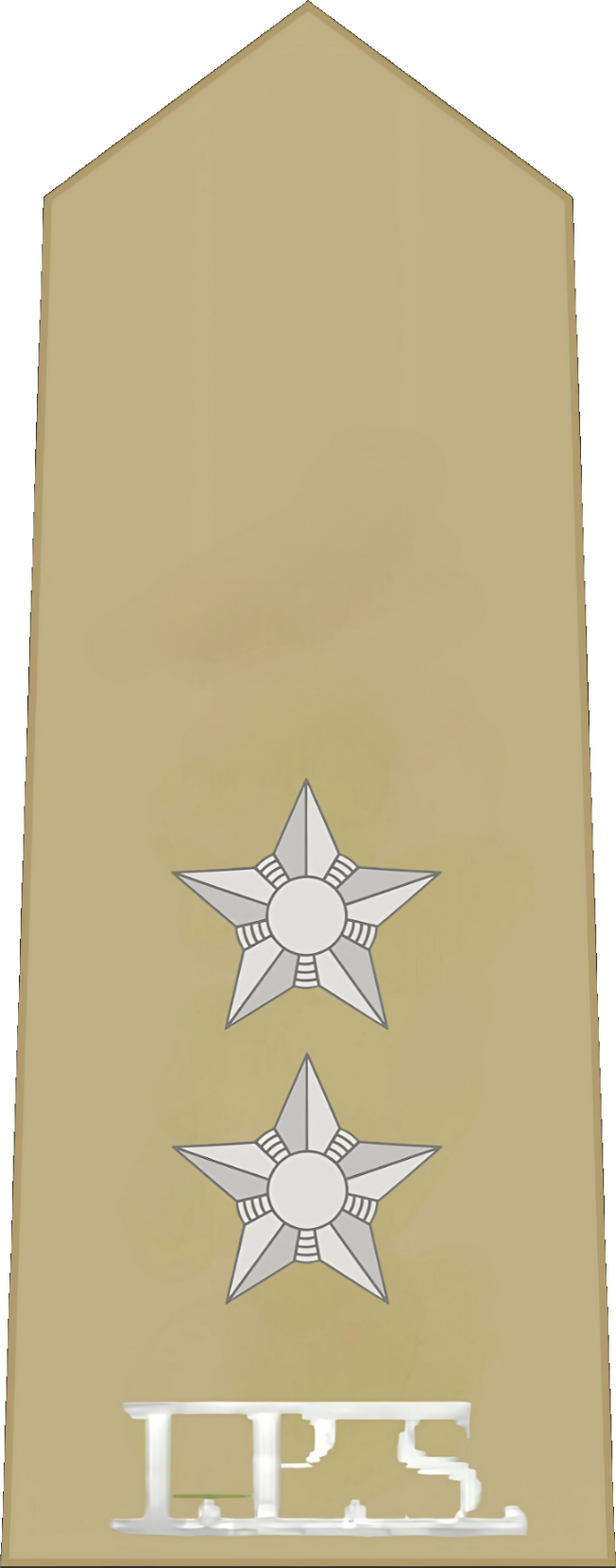
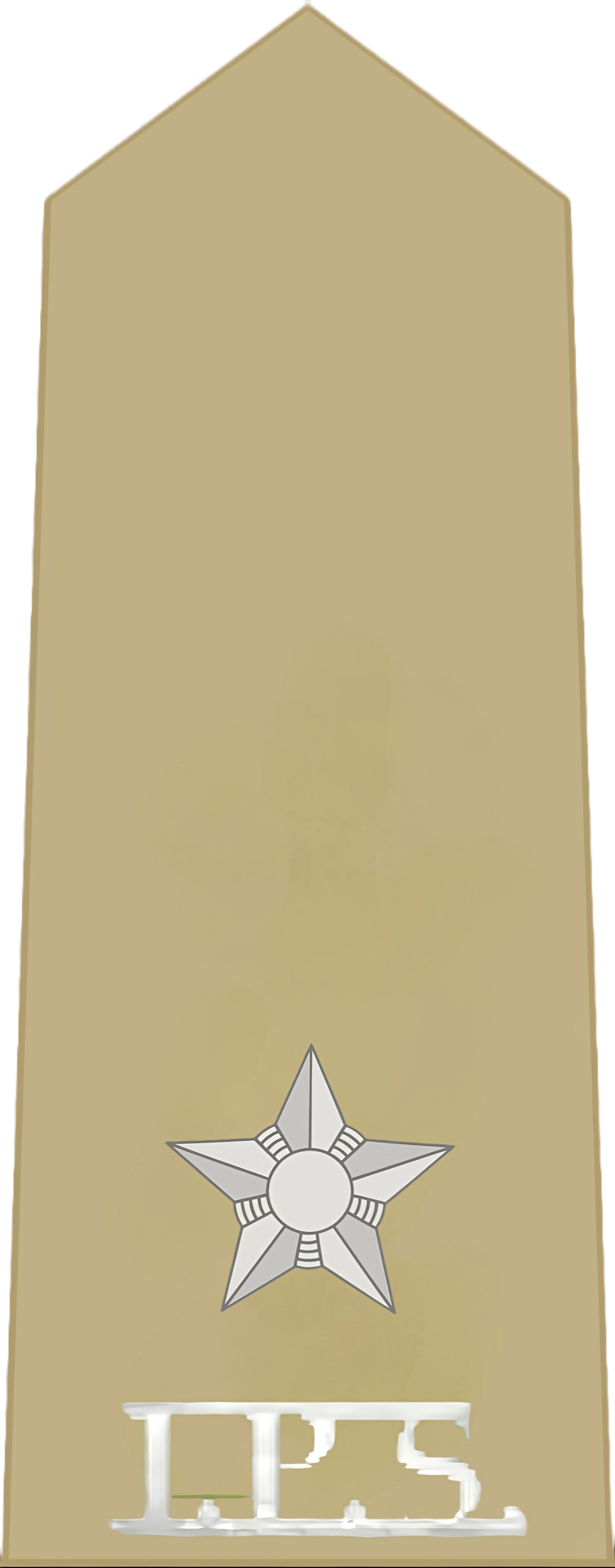
Rank
Director General of Police
Additional Director General of Police (Note: Rank insignia of DGP is similar to Additional DGP.)
Inspector General of Police
Deputy Inspector General of Police
Superintendent of Police (Selection Grade) (Note: The Senior Superintendent of Police (SSP) is a post, not a rank, typically held by an SP (selection grade or junior grade) in states like Uttar Pradesh, Jammu and Kashmir, and Punjab.)
Superintendent of Police
Additional superintendent of police
Assistant Superintendent of Police
Assistant superintendent of police (Probationary for two years)
Assistant Superintendent of Police (Probationary for one year)
Abbreviation
DGP
ADGP
IGP
DIGP
SP (SG)
SP
Addl.SP
ASP
ASP
ASP

- Note 1: The rank insignia of DGP, Spl.DGP, Addl.DGP is the same.
- Note 2: The equivalent rank to the ASP (Asst.SP) in State Police Services is the deputy superintendent of police (DSP/DySP).
- Note 3: The commissioner of police is a post typically held by DIG and above rank officers.

Non-gazette officers

Indian Police non-gazetted officers rank insignia
Insignia
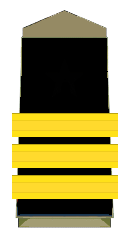
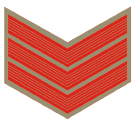
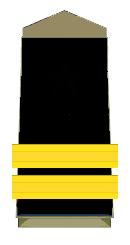
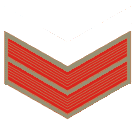
No insignia
Rank
Inspector of Police
Inspector / Circle Inspector (Note: Inspector or Circle Inspector with One Five-Pointed Star insignia exists in West Bengal Police.)
Assistant Police Inspector (Note: This rank exists only in the Maharashtra Police.)
Sub-Inspector
Sergeant (Kolkata Police)
Assistant Sub-Inspector
Head Constable (Note: Shoulder insignia rank only used in the Maharashtra Police.)
Senior Constable (Note: This rank is also known as senior constable, constable grade-I, and exists only in some state police forces.)
Police constable
Abbreviation
INSP
INSP / CO
API
SI
Sgt
ASI
HC
SC
PC

- The rank of Sergeant is used in India only in the Bihar Police and the Kolkata Police
- The One Five Pointed Star for the rank of Inspector is used by Police forces of 7 states viz. West Bengal, Jharkhand, Bihar, Sikkim, Assam, Nagaland and Tripura. This is because Inspectors of Police in these 7 states are Gazetted Officers. However, the Kolkata Police uses the Four Pointed Star of the Order of Bath for the ranks of Inspector and Assistant Commissioner of Police instead of Five Pointed Star. For the ranks of ASI, SI/Sergeant and Deputy Commissioner of Police, the usual Five Pointed Star is used
- Colour pattern and size of chevrons may vary according to the different rules of several distinct Indian State Police services.

== Control Center ==
Haryana Police has a control room No 112 and special Women Helpline no of 1091 which can be called from any landline or mobile phone.

== See also ==
- Crime reporting and tracking
  - Bureau of Police Research and Development (BPRD)
  - Call 112
  - Criminal record
  - Crime and Criminal Tracking Network and Systems (CCTNS)
  - Law enforcement in India
  - National Crime Records Bureau (NCRB)
  - Sex offender registry (SOR)
  - United Nations Office on Drugs and Crime (UNODC)
- Other police related
  - Indian Police Foundation and Institute
  - Sardar Vallabhbhai Patel National Police Academy
