= List of states and union territories of India by crime rate =

The crime rate (crime per 100,000 population) in India was 448.3 in 2023 according to the National Crime Records Bureau. Crime rate varies from state to state and also by the type of crime. Other factors that affect crime rate include registration of complaint, cognisance of offence, which differs in different states.

Some causes of crimes are region specific. Insurgents committed 147 crimes in 2023, mostly in Manipur. Left wing extremists committed 538 crimes in 2023, mostly in Chhattisgarh & Jharkhand. Terrorists committed 153 crimes in 2023, mostly in Jammu & Kashmir.

A large gap may exist between the reported crime rate in a region and the actual crime rate of that region, including both reported and unreported crimes.

== State-wise statistics ==
Data is based on the annual "Crime in India" publication by the National Crime Records Bureau.

Key:

- Crime Rate is calculated as crime per one lakh (100,000) of population. That is, rate of cognizable crime (under Indian Penal Code and Special & Local Laws)
- IPC: Indian Penal Code
- SLL: Special & Local Laws
- Charge-sheet rate: Cases where charges were framed against accused, as a percentage of total cases disposed after investigation.
- Conviction rate: Cases where accused was convicted by court after completion of a trial, as a percentage of total cases where trial was completed

Crime rate (per 100,000 population) head-wise 2023. Crimes against children rate is calculated per 100,000 children population.

| State / UT | Total Crimes (IPC+SLL) 2023 | Crime Rate (IPC+SLL) 2023 | Charge-sheet Rate (IPC+SLL) (%) 2023 | Conviction Rate (IPC) (%) 2023 | Violent Crime Rate 2023 | Murder 2023 | Rape 2023 | Kidnapping 2023 | Extortion 2023 | Robbery & Dacoity 2023 | Hit & Run 2023 | Illegal arms 2023 | Corruption (Total cases) 2023 |
|---|---|---|---|---|---|---|---|---|---|---|---|---|---|
| India | 6241569 | 448.3 | 80.1 | 54.0 | 31.2 | 2.0 | 4.4 | 8.2 | 0.9 | 2.2 | 3.7 | 3.1 | 4069 |
States
| Andhra Pradesh | 184293 | 346.3 | 92.8 | 62.7 | 12.1 | 1.7 | 1.6 | 1.4 | 0.9 | 0.5 | 1.0 | 0.0 | 160 |
| Arunachal Pradesh | 2941 | 187.9 | 57.8 | 31.3 | 29.0 | 3.6 | 9.3 | 4.1 | 2.8 | 2.3 | 1.0 | 0.6 | 9 |
| Assam | 64959 | 181.3 | 52.6 | 15.4 | 32.2 | 2.9 | 5.6 | 9.9 | 1.4 | 2.1 | 3.4 | 0.4 | 110 |
| Bihar | 353502 | 277.5 | 83.5 | 43.0 | 41.0 | 2.2 | 1.5 | 11.3 | 0.5 | 2.0 | 2.5 | 3.1 | 40 |
| Chhattisgarh | 115493 | 381.2 | 88.7 | 29.6 | 28.4 | 3.2 | 7.8 | 9.9 | 0.3 | 1.4 | 6.0 | 0.9 | 0 |
| Goa | 3082 | 195.4 | 79.8 | 25.8 | 23.0 | 1.6 | 12.4 | 4.9 | 0.5 | 0.7 | 2.1 | 0.2 | 0 |
| Gujarat | 578879 | 806.3 | 96.5 | 46.4 | 12.5 | 1.3 | 1.9 | 2.5 | 1.0 | 1.0 | 1.4 | 0.8 | 205 |
| Haryana | 224216 | 739.2 | 65.0 | 30.9 | 48.6 | 3.4 | 12.4 | 13.7 | 1.6 | 2.5 | 2.1 | 9.4 | 205 |
| Himachal Pradesh | 19987 | 267.2 | 86.6 | 27.6 | 25.0 | 1.2 | 9.3 | 5.9 | 0.2 | 0.1 | 0.7 | 0.1 | 73 |
| Jharkhand | 63838 | 161.1 | 69.6 | 25.8 | 31.2 | 3.7 | 6.3 | 4.2 | 1.2 | 1.5 | 5.8 | 1.7 | 55 |
| Karnataka | 214234 | 315.8 | 76.9 | 36.0 | 26.4 | 1.9 | 2.0 | 5.5 | 0.3 | 3.0 | 1.7 | 0.2 | 362 |
| Kerala | 584373 | 1631.2 | 97.9 | 88.9 | 28.6 | 1.0 | 4.5 | 0.9 | 0.3 | 2.7 | 0.3 | 1.0 | 211 |
| Madhya Pradesh | 495708 | 570.3 | 91.2 | 50.1 | 32.1 | 2.1 | 7.1 | 13.5 | 0.4 | 1.5 | 8.7 | 4.4 | 262 |
| Maharashtra | 596103 | 470.4 | 82.2 | 49.3 | 36.5 | 1.7 | 4.8 | 10.3 | 0.9 | 5.2 | 3.0 | 0.6 | 812 |
| Manipur | 20283 | 627.8 | 37.4 | 34.1 | 446.5 | 4.7 | 1.7 | 2.8 | 5.8 | 47.7 | 1.4 | 2.5 | 0 |
| Meghalaya | 3532 | 105.2 | 39.0 | 31.7 | 14.4 | 1.8 | 3.9 | 2.8 | 1.0 | 2.0 | 0.9 | 0.2 | 2 |
| Mizoram | 4050 | 326.3 | 61.0 | 95.1 | 13.9 | 1.9 | 5.9 | 0.4 | 0.5 | 1.5 | 0.3 | 2.0 | 4 |
| Nagaland | 1899 | 84.9 | 67.6 | 81.0 | 6.5 | 0.8 | 0.9 | 1.7 | 4.0 | 0.4 | 0.3 | 3.3 | 1 |
| Odisha | 199954 | 431.2 | 80.6 | 29.3 | 68.5 | 2.9 | 5.2 | 13.2 | 2.4 | 7.2 | 1.2 | 0.0 | 267 |
| Punjab | 69944 | 227.1 | 73.7 | 36.9 | 20.1 | 2.2 | 3.1 | 5.1 | 1.4 | 0.5 | 5.2 | 1.9 | 287 |
| Rajasthan | 317480 | 390.4 | 61.5 | 48.4 | 30.3 | 2.2 | 12.8 | 12.2 | 1.4 | 2.1 | 4.0 | 4.0 | 316 |
| Sikkim | 718 | 103.9 | 63.1 | 18.1 | 15.5 | 1.7 | 2.8 | 5.2 | 0.0 | 0.3 | 0.6 | 0.0 | 1 |
| Tamil Nadu | 539651 | 701.4 | 85.7 | 58.5 | 14.7 | 2.2 | 0.9 | 0.6 | 2.3 | 3.1 | 2.0 | 0.2 | 302 |
| Telangana | 183644 | 481.6 | 77.4 | 59.1 | 26.4 | 2.5 | 4.3 | 8.3 | 1.2 | 1.5 | 4.2 | 0.1 | 87 |
| Tripura | 5002 | 120.4 | 80.4 | 27.2 | 37.1 | 2.4 | 2.8 | 3.2 | 0.4 | 0.2 | 2.2 | 0.1 | 0 |
| Uttar Pradesh | 793020 | 335.3 | 73.7 | 74.9 | 20.9 | 1.4 | 3.1 | 7.0 | 0.4 | 0.6 | 7.8 | 9.2 | 169 |
| Uttarakhand | 34017 | 291.3 | 83.5 | 54.6 | 30.6 | 1.6 | 7.4 | 10.8 | 0.4 | 1.8 | 2.7 | 10.1 | 21 |
| West Bengal | 180272 | 181.6 | 88.9 | 8.5 | 47.2 | 1.7 | 2.3 | 8.3 | 0.4 | 0.4 | 0.1 | 1.4 | 8 |
Union Territories
| A&N Islands | 1873 | 464.8 | 94.9 | 27.8 | 30.3 | 2.0 | 7.3 | 5.5 | 0.2 | 1.2 | 0.7 | 0.0 | 8 |
| Chandigarh | 4185 | 338.9 | 65.4 | 45.2 | 31.2 | 1.4 | 17.9 | 13.0 | 0.3 | 1.6 | 2.1 | 1.5 | 7 |
| D&N Haveli and Daman & Diu | 865 | 66.9 | 60.4 | 7.8 | 10.7 | 1.5 | 1.4 | 3.8 | 0.3 | 0.6 | 2.8 | 0.0 | 0 |
| Delhi | 344263 | 1602.0 | 32.8 | 78.1 | 51.5 | 2.4 | 10.9 | 26.6 | 0.9 | 7.8 | 3.2 | 4.8 | 19 |
| Jammu and Kashmir | 29595 | 217.0 | 81.0 | 55.6 | 17.9 | 0.6 | 3.6 | 7.4 | 0.0 | 0.7 | 1.3 | 0.3 | 62 |
| Ladakh | 522 | 173.4 | 87.6 | 90.9 | 5.3 | 0.7 | 1.5 | 1.7 | 0.0 | 0.0 | 1.7 | 0.0 | 0 |
| Lakshadweep | 127 | 184.1 | 65.4 | 39.0 | 7.2 | 0.0 | 3.0 | 0.0 | 0.0 | 0.0 | 0.0 | 0.0 | 0 |
| Puducherry | 5065 | 305.5 | 95.7 | 58.2 | 14.9 | 1.7 | 1.0 | 1.4 | 0.8 | 1.0 | 0.0 | 0.0 | 4 |

== See also ==
- Crime in India
- Law enforcement in India
