= Death of Sumila Ronghangpi =

2021 child death in India

On 22 April 2021, an underage housemaid, Sumila Ronghangpi was found charred to death in her employer's house in Raha, Assam. She was resident of West Karbi Anglong district. Two of her employers, Prakash Chandra Borthakur and son Nayan Jyoti Borthakur hashave been arrested in case related to her death. Initial investigation reveal she was murdered and then burn to cover up the murder.

== Death ==
Sumila was brought to her employer Borthakur's house in 2017 with the promise of education. On 22 April 2021, she was found charred to death in her employer's house. As per a neighbour, her employer and his son were present at time of her death, and she was occasionally abused too. Her employer stated it was a suicide case.

== Arrests ==
Prakash Chandra Barthakur (68) and Son - Nayanjyoti Barthakur (31). Two of Ronghangpi's employers have been arrested in the case related to her death. Initial investigation revealed she was murdered and then burned to cover up the murder.

== Repercussion ==
The victim was 12 years old, underage from the tribal Karbi community, employed as domestic help, a resident of Sar Kro Kudam Ronghang village in West Karbi Anglong, Assam. The death of Sumila Ronghangpi created hue and cry among various tribes of Assam. Protests and processions were held seeking justice for Sumila Ronghangpi. Social organisations spoke out against the failure of government in the protection of women. The incident happened against the backdrop of violence against women in India. The incident exposed endemic cases of child abuse, death, neglecting children's right to education, exploitation of children from rural areas in the name of education, employing children below 14 years as domestic help in urban places.

== Timeline ==
- 22 April 2021 - Sumila Ronghangpi found dead.
- 26 April 2021 - Probe ordered and to report back within 30 days.
- 9 July 2021 - Proposed establishment of a school in honour of Sumila Ronghangpi.
- 20 July 2021 - Chargesheet filed and submitted to lower court.

== See also ==
- Child abuse
- Domestic violence
- Child labour in India
- Violence against women in India
