= BPRD =

BPRD may mean:

- Bureau of Police Research and Development, the premier Indian police modernising agency of India
- Bureau for Paranormal Research and Defense, a fictional organization in the comic book work of Mike Mignola
