= Bureau of Police Research and Development =

Research organisation under Ministry of Home Affairs, Government of India

Bureau of Police Research and Development पुलिस अनुसंधान एवं विकास ब्यूरो Pulis Anusndhaan Evn Vikaas Byuro

Agency overview
- Formed: 28 August 1970

Jurisdictional structure
- Federal agency: India
- Operations jurisdiction: India
- Governing body: Government of India
- General nature: Federal law enforcement

Operational structure
- Headquarters: New Delhi, India
- Agency executive: Alok Ranjan IPS, Director General
- Parent agency: Ministry of Home Affairs
- Divisions: 5: Administration; Modernisation / Development; Training; Research & Correctional; National Policing Mission

Notables
- Person: Dr. Anandswarup Gupta IPS, for being the founding Director General

Website
- http://www.bprd.nic.in

The Bureau of Police Research and Development (BPR&D) was set up on the 28 August 1970 to further the objectives of the Government of India regarding the modernisation of police forces. It has since evolved into a multifaceted consultancy organisation. At present it has 4 divisions – Research, Development, Training and Correctional Administration.

== Functions ==
Functions of the Bureau of Police Research and Development (BPR&D) are different for each of the four divisions and are as follows:

U.S ambassador to INDIA, with officer of BPR&D

=== Research Division ===
- Analysis and study of crime and problems of general nature affecting the police, e.g.,
  - Trends and causes of crime.
  - Prevention of crime-preventive measures, their effectiveness and relationship with crime.
  - Organisation, strength, administration, methods, procedures and techniques of the police forces and their modernisation, police act and manuals.
  - Improvements in methods of investigation, utility, and results of introducing scientific aids and punishment.
  - Inadequacy of laws.
  - Juvenile delinquency.
  - Police Uniform, badges, medals, decorations, colours, and flags, police drill, warrant of procedure etc.
- Assistance of Police Research programmes in States and Union Territories, processing and coordination of research projects, sponsoring extra mutual research.
- Work relating to Standing Committee on Police Research.
- Police Science Congress & other conferences and seminars relating to study of police problems.
- Participation in social defence and crime prevention programmes.
- Participation in the work of the United Nations in the field of prevention of crime and treatment of offenders.
- Maintenance of all India statistics of crime.
- Statistical analysis of trends of crime.
- Documentation relating to Police Science and Criminology.
- Publication of:
  - Police Research & Development Journal
  - Crime in India
  - Indian Police Journal
  - Accidental Deaths and Suicides
  - Research Reports and News Letters
  - Reports, Reviews, other journals and books relating to matters connected with police work.

=== Development Division ===
- Review of the performance of various types of equipment used by the police forces in India and development of new equipment in the following fields:
  - Arms and Ammunition
  - Riot Control Equipment
  - Traffic Control Equipment
  - Police Transport
  - Miscellaneous scientific equipment and scientific aids to investigation
- Liaison with the National laboratories, Indian Ordnance Factories, various scientific organisations and institutions and public and private sector undertakings in the above fields, coordination of development programmes and stimulating indigenous production of police equipment.
- Application of computer technology in various fields of police work.
- Police publicity and police publicity files, police weeks and parades.
- Work relating to Police Research & Development Advisory Council and its Standing Committees, other than on police research.

=== Training Division ===
- To review from time to time the arrangements for police training and the needs of the country in this field in the changing social conditions and the introduction of scientific techniques in training and in police work and to formulate and coordinate training policies and programmes in the field of police administration and management.
- Central Detective Training Schools, Kolkata, Hyderabad & Chandigarh.
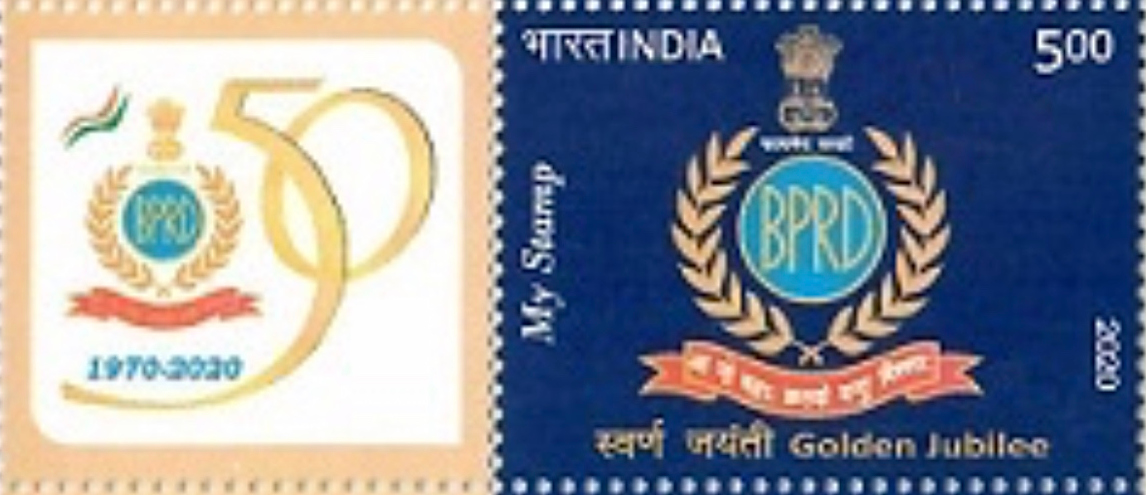
  A 2020 stamp dedicated to the 50th anniversary of BPR&D
  To evaluate training programmes with a view to securing such standardisation and uniformity in the training arrangements including courses, syllabi and curricula for various ranks in the States and Union Territories as may be desirable and to suggest modifications and improvements that may be considered necessary from time to time to meet new challenges and problems.
- To help devise new refresher, promotion, specialist and orientation courses considered necessary for the different grades and kinds of police officers.
- Work relating to the establishment of the Central Medico Legal Institute and the Central Traffic Institute.
- To prepare, in coordination with the police training institutions, standard manuals, textbooks, pamphlets, lecture notes, case studies, practical exercises and other educative literature for use in these institutions.
- To distribute relevant literature to Inspectors General/DIG(Training) in the States for circulation to officers in order to familiarise them with training concepts and to strengthen training consciousness among the higher ranks.
- To standardise equipment for training and training aids and to arrange for their production and supply to the various training institutions.
- To create and maintain a circulating library of films for the use of various police training institutions.
- To assist in the training of police officers of various ranks at appropriate non-police institutions inside and outside India.
- To organise the annual Symposium of the Heads of Police Training Institutions and short Seminars on various aspects of Police training.
- To suggest the establishment of new training institutions under the centre as necessary from time to time.
- To act as a clearing house for information relating to Syllabi, methods of training, teaching aids, training programmes and literature on various aspects of police work etc. from India and abroad.
- To help in the development of libraries in the Central and State Police training institutions.
- To liaise with the Directorate of Training of the Department of Personnel in relation inter-alia to training aids projects and fellowships under the United Nations Development Programme, UNESCO & Colombo Plan etc.

=== Correctional Administration ===
- Analysis and study of prison statistics and problems of general nature affecting Prison Administration.
- Assimilation and dissemination of relevant information to the States in the field of Correctional Administration.
- Coordination of Research Studies conducted by RICAs and other Academic/Research Institutes in Correctional Administration and to frame guidelines for conduct of research studies/surveys in consultation with the State Governments.
- To review training programmes keeping in view the changing social conditions, introduction of new scientific techniques and other related aspects.
- To prepare uniform Training Module including course, syllabi, curriculum, etc. For providing training at various levels to the Prison staff in the field of Correctional Administration.
- Publication of reports, newsletters, bulletins and preparation of Audio Visual aids, etc. in the field of Correctional Administration.
- To set up an Advisory Committee to guide the work relating to Correctional Administration.

== Directors General ==
Term	Years	Parent Cadre	Director General	Batch (RR)	Domicile
1970–			Dr. A. Gupta, IAS	1974	
			S. Venugopal Rao, IPS		
			K. K. Dave, IPS		
			S. Tandon, IPS		
		Madhya Pradesh	P. R. Rajagopal, IPS	1948	
			H. R. K. Talwar, IPS		
		Gujarat	B. R. Kalyanpurkar, IPS	1950	
			S. K. Malik, IPS		
		Assam	T. A. Subramanian, IPS		
		Rajasthan	V. K. Kaul, IPS	1956	
		Rajasthan	D. P. N. Singh, IPS	1957	
		Jammu and Kashmir	J. N. Saksena, IPS		
			N. K. Singh, IPS		
		Manipur	G. S. Pandher, IPS	1964	
		Odisha	B. B. Nanda, IPS	1965	
			V. N. Singh, IPS		
31.1.2002–		Odisha	L. C. Amarnathan, IPS	1968	
		Punjab	Sarabjeet Singh, IPS	1965	
		Himachal Pradesh	Dr. N. C. Joshi, IPS		
2005–2007	3	AGMUT	Dr. Kiran Bedi, IPS	1972	Punjab
		Haryana	K. Koshy, IPS	1973	Kerala
–30.9.2010		West Bengal	Prasun Mukherjee, IPS	1973	
2.10.2010–		Uttar Pradesh	Vikram Srivastava, IPS	1973	
–31.12.2012		Punjab	K. N. Sharma, IPS	1978	
3.7.2013–31.3.2015	2	Punjab	Rajan Gupta, IPS	1978	
11.4.2016–30.9.2017	1	Maharashtra	Meeran C. Borwankar, IPS	1981	
14.7.2018–30.11.2018	4 months	Andhra Pradesh	N. R. Wasan, IPS	1980	
		Uttar Pradesh	A. P. Maheshwari, IPS	1984	
		Andhra Pradesh	V. S. K. Kaumudi, IPS	1986	
25.8.2021–31.3.2024	3	AGMUT	Balaji Srivatsav, IPS	1988	
27.3.2024–Present		Rajasthan	Rajeev Kumar Sharma, IPS	1990	

== See also ==
- Crime reporting and tracking
  - Call 112
  - Criminal record
  - Crime and Criminal Tracking Network and Systems (CCTNS)
  - Law enforcement in India
  - National Crime Records Bureau (NCRB)
  - Sex offender registry (SOR)
  - United Nations Office on Drugs and Crime (UNODC)
- Other police related
  - Indian Police Foundation and Institute
  - Sardar Vallabhbhai Patel National Police Academy
