= Indian Police Foundation and Institute =

Indian research institute

The Indian Police Foundation and Institute is a New Delhi-based research organisation that brings police and citizens together to improve professional, ethical, and service-delivery standards.

Its subsidiary, the Indian Police Institute, is a professional home for the Indian Police, providing a platform dedicated to applied research, idea generation, standards-setting, capacity building, and evidence-based policing. While several individual police officers and institutions already do similar work at field level, an independent research forum was needed to supplement ongoing efforts and support the Indian police force.

The foundation is a response to the groundswell of public demand for an efficient, accountable and people-centric police that functions impartially, respects human dignity and human rights and steadfastly upholds the rule of law in all situations. The foundation believes that a robust criminal justice system, supported by a professional police force, should be an important pillar of modern India.

The foundation believes that transformative reforms are possible through appropriate interventions in skill-building and attitudinal training, through reforms that are bold and practical, and through collective action of all stakeholders—the government, the police, the private sector, as well as civil society—to drive a nationwide campaign for strengthening India's grassroots-level policing institutions.

The Indian Police Foundation is led by a multidisciplinary Board responsible for governance, leadership, and strategic guidance of its policies, as well as with interfacing with government agencies and leading the policy advocacy initiatives. Prakash Singh, a former Indian Police Service officer and former first Chairman of the Foundation, is well known for his efforts on police reform. Mr O.P. Singh, former Director General of Police, Uttar Pradesh, is the current President & CEO of the foundation. The organisation was inaugurated on 21 October 2015 by Union Home Minister Rajnath Singh.

On 14 Dec 2015, it entered into an association with Gujarat Forensic Sciences University, Gandhinagar: the world's first university solely dedicated to Forensic & Investigative Science.

== See also ==
- Crime reporting and tracking
  - Bureau of Police Research and Development (BPRD)
  - Call 112
  - Criminal record
  - Crime and Criminal Tracking Network and Systems (CCTNS)
  - Law enforcement in India
  - National Crime Records Bureau (NCRB)
  - Sex offender registry (SOR)
  - United Nations Office on Drugs and Crime (UNODC)
- Other police related
  - Sardar Vallabhbhai Patel National Police Academy
  - Ministry of Home Affairs (India)
  - Police Foundation (UK)
  - Police Foundation of USA
