= Violence against women in India =

Public health issue of violent acts against women

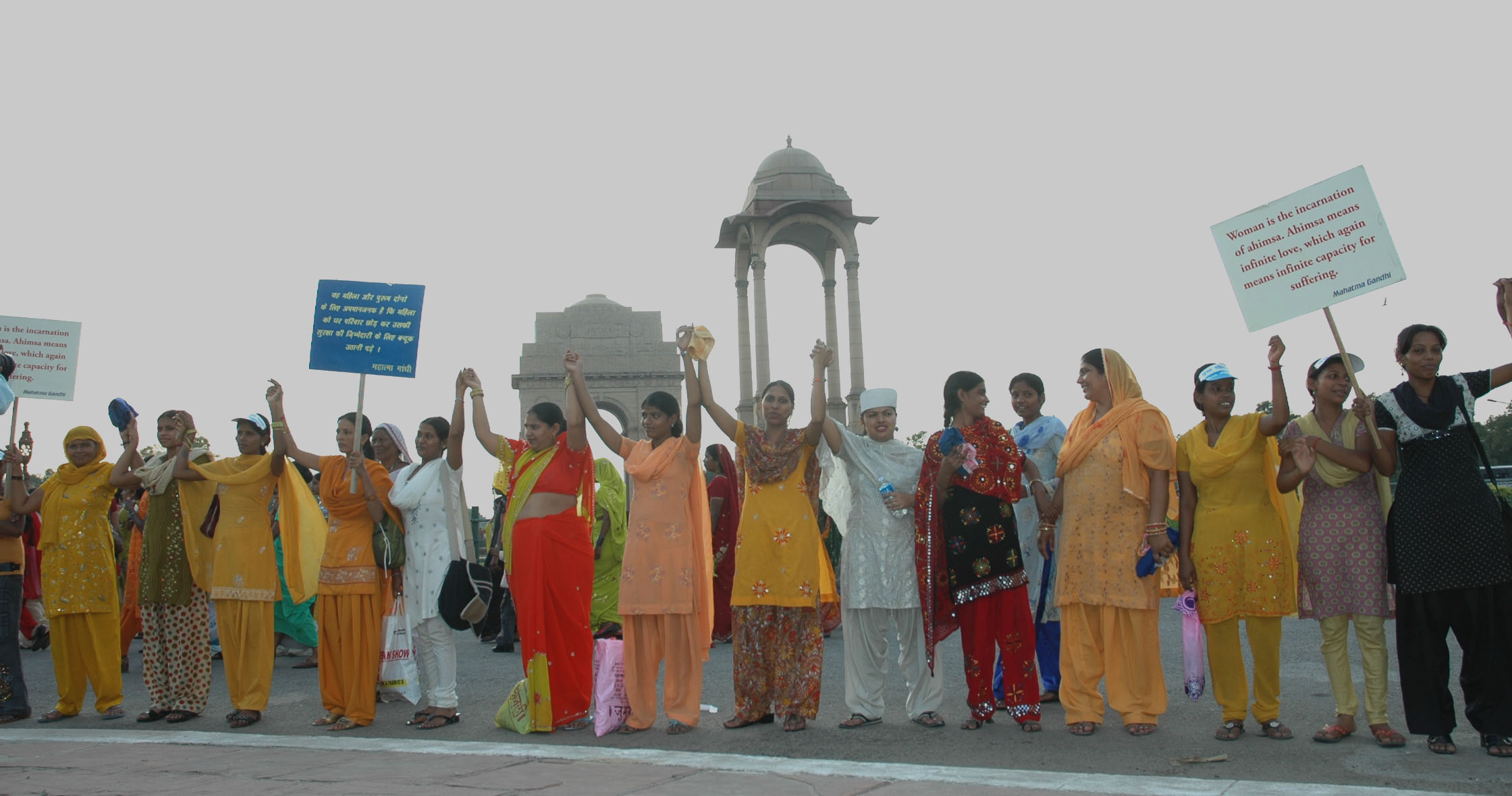
A formation of human chain at India Gate by the women from different walks of life at the launch of a National Campaign on prevention of violence against women, in New Delhi on 2 October 2009

Violence against women in India refers to physical or sexual violence committed against a woman, typically by a man.

Common forms of violence against women in India include acts such as domestic abuse, sexual assault, murder, female infanticide, and acid throwing.

== Background statistics ==
- According to the report of National Crime Report Bureau, domestic violence accounts for more than 30% of the crimes against women.
- According to the National Crime Records Bureau, in 2011, there were more than 228,650 reported incidents of crime against women, while in 2021, there were 428,278 reported incidents, an 87% increase.
- Statistics calculated from the National Crime Records Bureau capture reporting to the police, most violence against women is not reported to the police.
- In January 2011, the International Men and Gender Equality Survey (IMAGES) Questionnaire reported that 24% of Indian men had committed sexual violence at some point during their lives.
- India's Gender Gap Index rating was 0.629 in 2022, placing it in 135th place out of 146 countries.
- According to data from the National Family Health Surveys, physical violence by husbands is the most common type of violence experienced by women. Sexual violence by husbands is the next most common. Most violence, whether physical or sexual, or whether by husbands or others, is not reported to the police.

== Murders ==
=== Dowry deaths ===
A dowry death is the murder or suicide of a married woman caused by a dispute over her dowry. In some cases, husbands and in-laws will attempt to extort a greater dowry through continuous harassment and torture which sometimes results in the wife committing suicide. The majority of these suicides are done through hanging, poisoning or self-immolation. Bride burning, a form of dowry death, occurs when a woman is set on fire. This act is referred to as bride burning murder, and it is frequently staged to look like a suicide or accident. In some instances, the woman is set on fire in a manner that suggests she caught fire while cooking on a kerosene stove. Despite the illegality of dowry in India, the tradition of giving costly gifts to the groom and his relatives remains prevalent at weddings organized by the bride's family.

A map of the reported dowry deaths in India, per 100,000 people (2012)

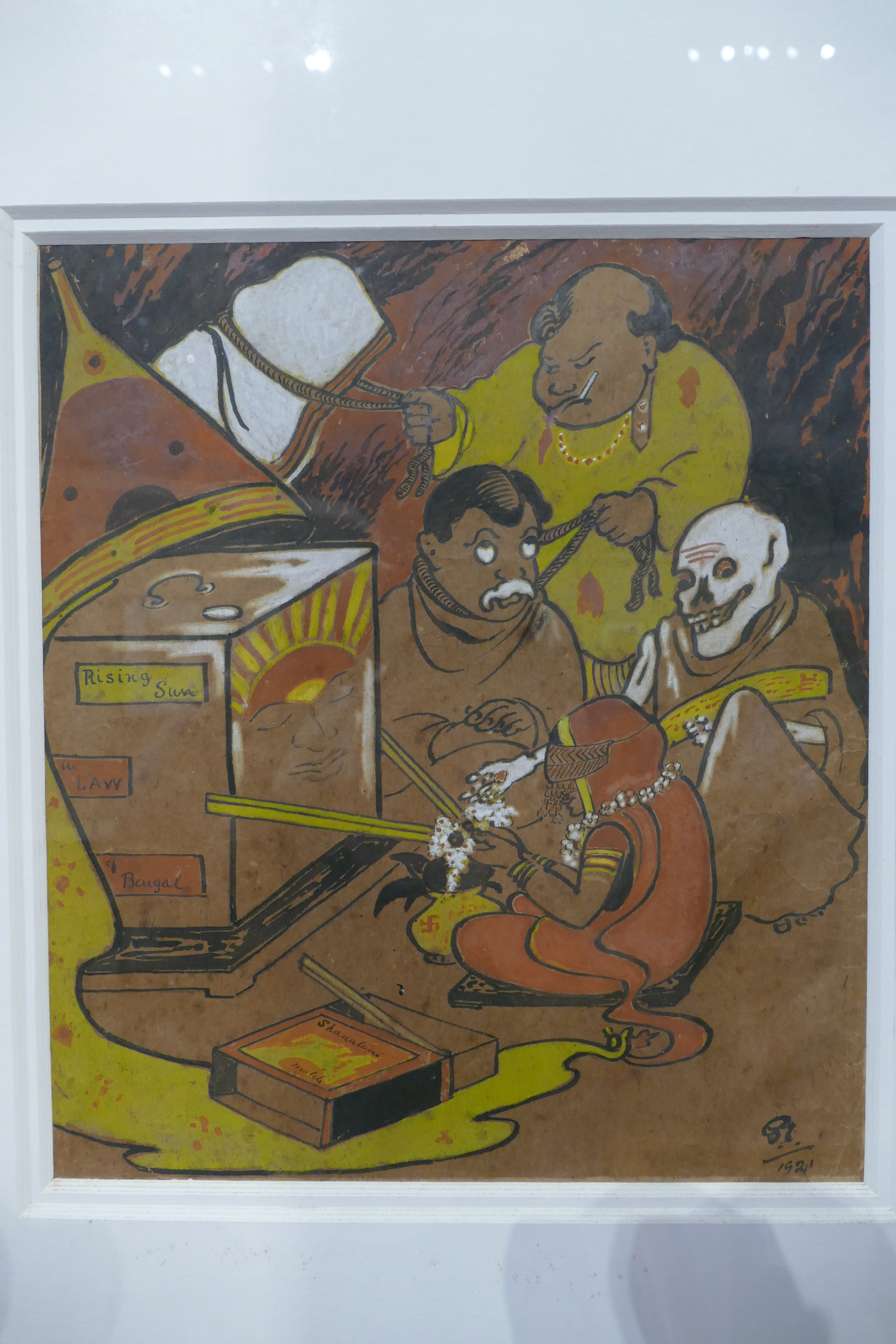
Rising son in law in Bengal, painting by Gaganendranath Tagore - Indian Museum, Kolkata

According to the National Crime Records Bureau (NCRB) data, 6,589 dowry deaths were registered in the year 2021 all over the country, a 3.85% decline from 2020, with the highest number of dowry deaths from the state of Uttar Pradesh (2,222 dowry deaths) and the highest dowry death rate (per 1,00,000 population) in the state of Haryana.

As of 31 December 2024, data from the NCW website showed that 17% (4,383) of the complaints were related to dowry harassment, alongside 292 reported cases of dowry deaths, showcasing the ongoing challenges women continue to face within their marital homes.

Year	Reported dowry deaths
2008	8,172
2009	8,383
2010	8,391
2011	8,618
2012	8,233
2020	6,843
2021	6,589

=== Honour killings ===
An honour killing is the murder of a family member who is considered to have brought dishonour and shame upon the family.

Examples of reasons for honour killings include:

- The refusal to enter an arranged marriage.
- Committing adultery.
- Choosing a partner that the family disapproves off.
- Becoming a victim of rape.

Village caste councils or khap panchayats in certain regions of India regularly pass death sentences for persons who do not follow their diktats on caste or gotra. The volunteer group known as Love Commandos from Delhi, runs a helpline dedicated to rescuing couples who are afraid of violence for marrying outside of caste lines.

The most prominent areas where honour killings occur in India are the northern states—they're especially numerous in Haryana, Bihar, Uttar Pradesh, Rajasthan, Jharkhand, Himachal Pradesh, and Madhya Pradesh. Honour killings have notably increased in some Indian states which has led to the Supreme Court of India, in June 2010, issuing notices to both the Indian central government and six states to take preventative measures against honour killings.

Honour killings can be very violent, for example, Honour killings can involve extreme violence, with documented cases of severe punishment for defying family or societal expectations. upon hearing that she was dating a man who he did not approve of. Another example was in September 2013 when a young couple decided to get married after having a love affair and were later brutally murdered.

=== Female infanticide ===
Female infanticide is the selected killing of a newborn female child or the termination of a female fetus through sex-selective abortion.

In India, there is incentive to bear a son due to their role in providing security for the family in old age and conducting rituals for deceased parents and ancestors. Conversely, daughters are viewed as a societal and economic burden. An illustration of this is the practice of dowry. The apprehension of being unable to afford a socially acceptable dowry and facing social ostracism can result in female infanticide in economically disadvantaged families.

Pew Research Center estimated that there are as many as 9 million females missing from the Indian population in the period 2000-2019 according to Indian government data.

Contemporary advancements in medical technology enable the determination of a child's sex during the fetal stage. Following the identification of the fetus's sex through these modern prenatal diagnostic methods, families have the option to choose abortion based on gender. A study revealed that out of 8,000 abortions, 7,997 were performed on female fetuses.

The fetal sex determination and sex-selective abortion by medical professionals now costs 1,000 crore Rupees (244 million US Dollars).

Background:

- The Preconception and Prenatal Diagnostic Techniques Act of 1994 (PCPNDT Act 1994) was modified in 2003 in order to target medical professionals. The Act has proven ineffective due to the lack of implementation.
- Sex-selective abortions have totaled approximately 4.2-12.1 million from 1980 to 2010.
- There was a greater increase in the number of sex-selective abortions in the 1990s than the 2000s.
- Poorer families are responsible for a higher proportion of abortions than wealthier families.
- Significantly more abortions occur in rural areas versus urban areas when the first child is female

== Sexual crimes ==
=== Rape ===
India is perceived as one of the world's most dangerous countries for sexual violence against women. Rape is one of the most common crimes in India.

Year	Reported rapes
2008	21,467
2009	21,397
2010	22,172
2011	24,206
2012	24,923
2013	34,707
2014	36,735
2015	34,651
2016	38,947
2017	32,599
2018	33,356
2019	32,033
2020	28,046
2021	31,677
2022	30,948
2023	31,204

Criminal Law (Amendment) Act, 2013 defines rape as penile and non-penile penetration in bodily orifices of a woman by a man, without the consent of the woman.

- According to the National Crime Records Bureau, one woman is raped every 20 minutes in India.
- Incidents of reported rape increased 3% from 2011 to 2012.
- Incidents of reported incest rape increased 46.8% from 268 cases in 2011 to 392 cases in 2012.
- Rape accounted for 10.9% of reported cases of violence against women in 2016. Victims of rape are increasingly reporting their rapes and confronting the perpetrator. Women are becoming more independent and educated, which is increasing their likelihood to report their rape.

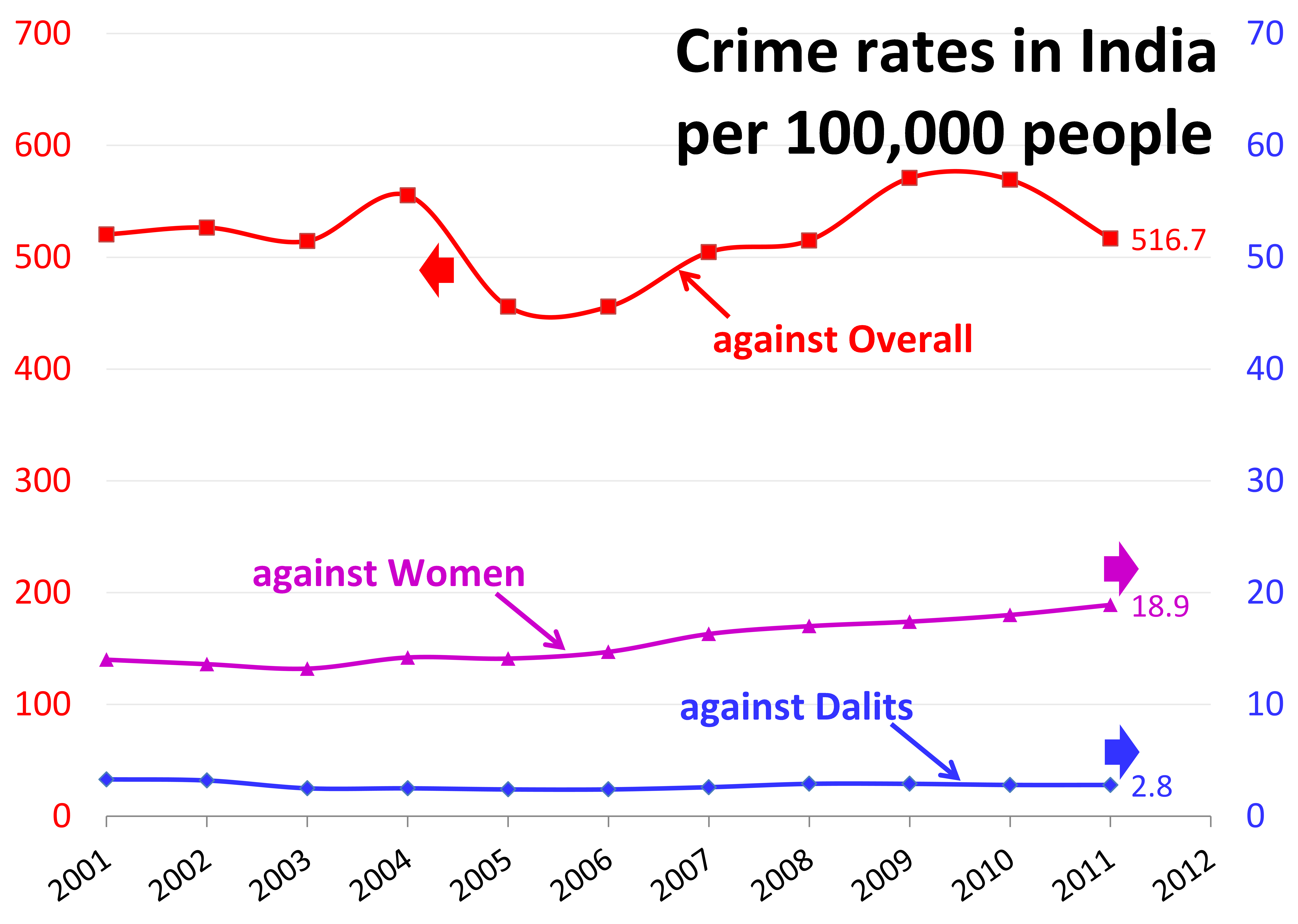
2001 to 2011 crime rates against Scheduled Castes, women and overall in India per 100,000 population

Despite an increase in reported cases of rape, numerous incidents either remain unreported or have their complaints withdrawn, often stemming from concerns about compromising family honour. Many women face challenges in obtaining justice for rape cases as law enforcement may not provide a fair hearing, and medical evidence is frequently undocumented, allowing offenders to evade consequences within the current legal framework.

After international news reported the gang rape of a 23-year-old student on a moving bus that occurred in Delhi, in December 2012, Delhi experienced a significant increase in reported rapes. The number of reported rapes nearly doubled from 143 reported in January–March 2012 to 359 during the three months after the incident. After the Delhi rape case, self defense programs run by NGOs like Survival Instincts and Krav Maga Global (KMG) were made mandatory in corporate organizations, and the International Women's Day programs started focusing on improving women's safety in workplaces, and homes.

==== Marital rape ====
In India, marital rape is not a criminal offense. India is one of fifty countries that have not yet outlawed marital rape.

- 20% of Indian men admit to forcing their wives or partners to have sex.
- 6.1% of married Indian women have experienced sexual violence.

Marital rape can be classified into one of three types:

- Battering rape: This includes both physical and sexual violence. The majority of marital rape victims experience battering rape.
- Force-only rape: Husbands use the minimum amount of force necessary to coerce his wife.
- Compulsive or obsessive rape: Torture and/or "perverse" sexual acts occur and are often physically violent.

=== Modesty related violence ===
Violence against women related to modesty encompasses assaults intended to outrage a woman's modesty and insults to the modesty of women.

In the period from 2011 to 2012, there was a 5.5% rise in reported assaults with the intent to outrage her modesty, with Madhya Pradesh contributing 6,655 cases, making up 14.7% of the national incidents. During the same period, reported insults to the modesty of women increased by 7.0%, with Andhra Pradesh recording 3,714 cases, constituting 40.5% of the national total, and Maharashtra documenting 3,714 cases, representing 14.1% of the national total.

Year	Assaults with intent to outrage modesty	Insults to the modesty of women
2008	40,413	12,214
2009	38,711	11,009
2010	40,613	9,961
2011	42,968	8,570
2012	45,351	9,173
2013	70,739	12,589
2014	82,235	9,735
2015	82,422	8,685

=== Human trafficking and forced prostitution ===
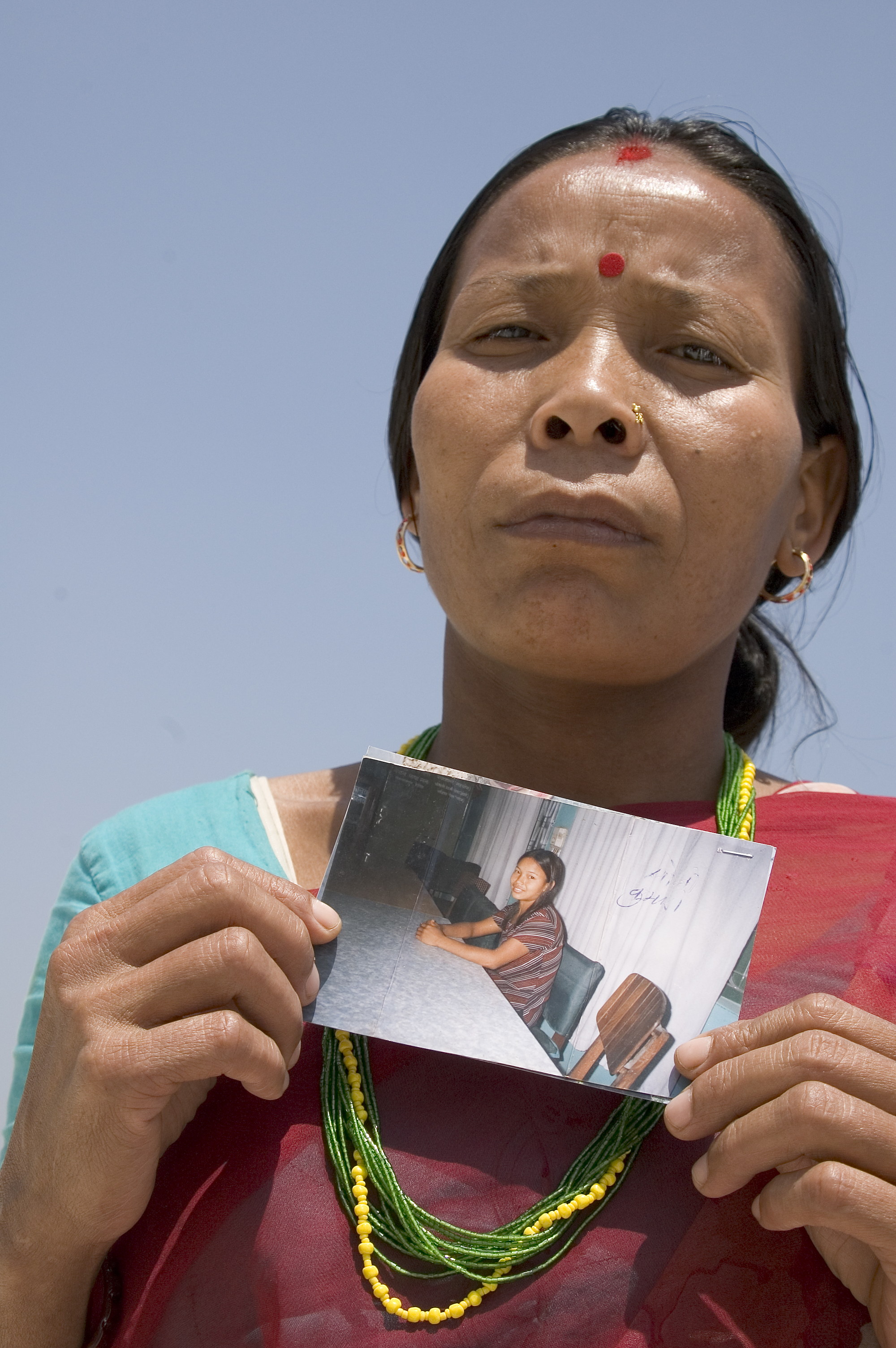
A mother who travelled from her village in Nepal to Mumbai, in India, with the aspiration of locating and rescuing her teenage daughter who had been trafficked into an Indian brothel.

During the period between 2011 and 2012, a noticeable surge of 5.3% was observed in the occurrences of violations under the Immoral Traffic (Prevention) Act of 1956 in India. Within this alarming trend, Tamil Nadu reported a substantial 500 incidents, representing a significant 19.5% share of the total nationwide violations. Simultaneously, Andhra Pradesh documented 472 incidents, contributing significantly with an 18.4% share to the overall national statistic. This increase in reported violations underscores the pressing need for enhanced efforts and measures to address and curb the illicit activities falling under the purview of the Immoral Traffic (Prevention) Act of 1956 in various states across the country.

Year	Imported girls from foreign countries	Violations of the Immoral Traffic Act
2008	67	2,659
2009	48	2,474
2010	36	2,499
2011	80	2,435
2012	59	2,563
2013	31	2,579
2014	13	2,070
2015	6	2,424

=== Domestic violence ===
- Domestic violence is abuse by one partner against another in an intimate relationship such as dating, marriage, cohabitation or a familial relationship.
- Domestic violence is also known as domestic abuse, spousal abuse, battering, family violence, dating abuse and intimate partner violence (IPV).
- Domestic violence can be physical, emotional, verbal, economic and sexual abuse.
- Domestic violence can be subtle, coercive or violent. As politician Renuka Choudary says, in India, 70% of women are victims of domestic violence.

The National Family Health Survey (NFHS) conducted in 2016 uncovered a concerning aspect: a substantial 86% of Indian women who experienced domestic violence chose not to disclose their ordeal, refraining from sharing it with friends or family members. This silence is intricately tied to the victims' internalization of social norms, leading them to believe that they are inadequate as wives and, consequently, deserving of the inflicted punishment.

The pervasive acceptance of domestic violence among women is further highlighted by survey findings indicating that 45% of Indian women rationalize their husbands' abusive actions. The complexity of this issue is illuminated by the National Family Health Survey of 2019–21, pointing out the alarming acceptance of spousal abuse in the southern states of Tamil Nadu, Karnataka, Andhra Pradesh, and Telangana. In these states, a striking 80% of wives express agreement that their husbands are justified in resorting to physical violence, a notably higher percentage compared to other regions in India.

Equally disconcerting is the acknowledgment by 38% of Indian men admitting to engaging in physical abuse against their partners. In response to the widespread prevalence of domestic violence, the Indian government has implemented legislative measures, notably the Protection of Women from Domestic Violence Act of 2005. While these efforts signify a commitment to addressing the issue, the data underscores the complex interplay of societal attitudes and norms that contribute to the persistence of domestic violence, emphasizing the need for comprehensive strategies to challenge and dismantle deeply ingrained beliefs and behaviors.

Year	Reported cruelty by a husband or relative
2008	81,344
2009	89,546
2010	94,041
2011	99,135
2012	106,527
2013	118,866
2014	122,877
2015	113,403

=== Forced child marriage ===
Young girls face a heightened susceptibility to coerced early marriages, owing to their dual status as both children and females. Their vulnerability is exacerbated by their limited comprehension of the significance and obligations associated with marriage. The perception of girls as a burden on their parents and apprehension that they might break their chastity prior to marriage are contributing factors to child marriage. There have been calls for interventions and awareness programs to address the root causes and consequences of child marriages, recognizing the unique challenges faced by young girls.

Around 7.84 million female children under the age of 10 are married in India.

== Acid throwing ==
Acid throwing, also known as an acid attack or vitriolage, stands as a brutal form of violent assault disproportionately affecting women in India. This act involves the intentional hurling of acid or corrosive substances onto an individual's body "with the intention to disfigure, maim, torture, or kill." Typically directed at the face, acid attacks cause severe burns, damaging the skin and often exposing or dissolving bone. The aftermath of such attacks is marked by enduring physical scars, potential blindness, and the onset of various social, psychological, and economic challenges.

Recognizing the gravity of this issue, the Indian legislature has taken steps to regulate the sale of acid. However, despite these measures, women in India face a heightened risk of falling victim to acid attacks, constituting at least 72% of reported cases. Disturbingly, the country has witnessed a rising trend in acid attacks over the past decade.

Between 2014 and 2018, National Crime Records Bureau data revealed that 1,483 victims registered cases of acid attacks in India. While the number of acid attacks continues to rise, there is a concerning decline in the number of people charged by the police. Uttar Pradesh, West Bengal, and Delhi collectively account for 42% of all acid attack victims in India. Perpetrators of these horrific crimes often evade punishment, as exemplified by the fact that out of 734 cases that went to trial in 2015, only 33 cases resulted in completion.

In a poignant response to this crisis, in 2018, Zainul Abideen ran a 720 km route known as the golden triangle in India, spanning from Delhi to Agra to Jaipur, to raise awareness about acid and rape attacks and advocate for women's safety. This initiative underscores the urgent need for widespread awareness and systemic changes to curb the alarming incidence of acid attacks and ensure justice for the survivors.

== Perpetuation ==
The persistence of violence against women in India is deeply rooted in entrenched systems of sexism and patriarchy that permeate Indian culture. The cycle begins in early childhood, where young girls face unequal access to education compared to their male counterparts. Gender-based inequality manifests even earlier, with reports indicating that female children often receive less food and are provided with less nutritious diets lacking in essential elements like butter and milk and 80% of boys attend primary school, while only half of the girls are afforded the same opportunity.

Education itself becomes a contributing factor to the perpetuation of gender disparities, as girls are informed about the inequities they will face in life, whereas boys remain uninformed and unprepared to treat women and girls as equals.

As women progress into adulthood, the social climate continues to reinforce inequality, contributing to the prevalence of violence against them. Within the context of marriage, many women in India come to perceive violence as a routine aspect of their married lives. Those subjected to gender-based violence often face victim-shaming, being told that their safety is solely their responsibility and that any harm they endure is their own fault. Social and cultural beliefs, such as the importance of family honour, exert immense pressure on women to remain complicit in the face of abuse.

When a woman decides to report an incident of gender-based violence or crime, access to adequate support is not guaranteed. Law enforcement officers and doctors may opt not to report cases due to fears of damaging their own honour or bringing shame upon themselves. Even when a victim seeks medical assistance, archaic and invasive methods like the notorious "two-finger test" are often employed, exacerbating the problem and causing psychological harm.

In response to this pervasive issue, organizations like Dilaasa have emerged to combat the perpetuation of violence against women in India. Dilaasa, a hospital-based crisis center operated in collaboration with CEHAT, aims to provide proper care for survivors of violence against women and strives to address gender inequality. From 2000 to 2013, around 3,000 victims of sexual assault, domestic abuse, or other forms of gender-based violence have registered with Dilaasa, underscoring the urgent need for comprehensive efforts to break the cycle of violence and foster gender equality in India.

== See also ==
- Prostitution in India
- Crime in India
- Men Against Violence and Abuse
- Domestic violence in India
- Women in India
- Entry of women to Sabarimala
