= Men Against Violence and Abuse =

Men Against Violence and Abuse (MAVA) is an Indian organisation that works to prevent gender-based violence. Started in 1993, it is one of the first men's organisation in the country to work on preventing violence against women.

== History ==
Men Against Violence and Abuse (MAVA) started out with an advertisement posted by a journalist, C.Y. Gopinath, in several journals in Mumbai in 1991. The ad asked for men who wanted to oppose gender-based violence and 205 men responded. The men met for a year or so, creating a core group and Harish Sadani became the leader. The group felt that both men and women needed to be "liberated from the shackles of patriarchy." In March 1993, the group was formally organised in Mumbai. In 1996, MAVA began a journal, Purush Spandana (Men's Expressions), written in Marathi which is published annually during the time of Diwali.

In 2006, Sadani received a fellowship from the Population Council to create a pilot project for MAVA called Yuva Maitri. The program brought young men to a camp experience where they discussed and reflected on gender roles and relationships between genders. The Yuva Maitri program is still part of MAVA's programming and by 2014, had reached around 80,000 young men and created 500 youth mentors.

== About ==
Men Against Violence and Abuse (MAVA) operates in the state of Maharashtra. MAVA provides counselling, guidance for couples getting married, self-defence classes for women, a call in help-line, and other programs dealing with gender issues. MAVA and women's group, Akshara, have posted information in Mumbai colleges about gender-based violence and gender issues. MAVA provides a place for men to open up to other men about issues in their lives.

A documentary, directed by Inka Achté, and called Boys Who Like Girls (2018) profiles some of the work that MAVA has done.
