= VSK Kaumudi =

- Born: 3 November 1962 (age 63)
- Organization: Ministry of Home Affairs India Special Secretary (Internal security) Secretary (Security) Cabinet Secretariat

VSK Kaumudi (born 3 November 1962) is a retired IPS officer of 1986 batch, former Special Secretary (Internal security), Ministry of Home Affairs (India) Government of India and Secretary (Security) in Cabinet Secretariat Government of India.

Kaumudi was director general, Board of Police Research & Development Additional Director General of National Investigation Agency,
