= Crime in India =

Crime rate in India 2023 (per 100,000 inhabitants)
- Murder: 2.0
- Rape: 4.4
- Kidnapping: 8.2
- Death by road accidents: 11.3
- Dowry deaths: 0.9
- Grievous hurt: 7.2
- Sexual harassment: 2.6
- Human trafficking: 0.1
- Riots: 2.8
- Theft: 49.5
- Burglary: 7.7
- Extortion: 0.9
- Robbery & Dacoity: 2.2
- Forgery, cheating & fraud: 13.0
- Drugs use & trafficking: 8.6
- Illegal arms: 3.1
- Crimes against children: 17.4
- Cyber crime: 6.2
- Note - Rate of crime against children is calculated per 100,000 children population

Crime in India has been recorded since the British Raj, with comprehensive statistics now compiled annually by the National Crime Records Bureau (NCRB), under the Ministry of Home Affairs (India).

In 2023, a total of 62,41,569 crimes, comprising 37,63,102 Indian Penal Code (IPC) crimes and 24,78,467 Special and Local Laws (SLL) crimes were registered nationwide. The crime rate is 448.3 in 2023, highest in the previous three years. In 2023, offences affecting the human body contributed 31.5%, offences against property contributed 23.3%, and miscellaneous IPC crimes contributed 30.3% of all cognizable IPC crimes. Murder rate was 2.0 per 100,000, kidnapping rate was 8.2 per 100,000, and rape rate was 4.4 per 100,000 in 2023.

According to the UN, the homicide rate was 2.95 per 100,000 in 2020 with 40,651 recorded, down from a peak of 5.46 per 100,000 in 1992 and essentially unchanged since 2017, higher than most countries in Asia and Europe and lower than most in the Americas and Africa although numerically one of the highest due to the large population.

The percentage of IPC cases pending investigation at the end of 2023 was 29.2%. Charge-sheet rate is calculated as all cases where charges were framed as a percentage of total cases disposed after investigation. The charge-sheet rate of IPC crimes in India was 72.7% in 2023. Conviction rate is calculated as all cases where accused was convicted by court after completion of a trial, as a percentage of total cases where trial was completed. The conviction rate of IPC crimes in India was 54.0% in 2023.

In 2023, 45,544 murders were under investigation by police, of which charges were framed in 24,575; and 40,393 rapes were under investigation by police, of which charges were framed in 24,582. In 2023, 2,72,198 murders were under trial in courts, of which conviction was given in 7,181; and 2,03,067 rapes were under trial in courts, of which conviction was given in 4,464. The murder conviction rate was 37.7 and the rape conviction rate was 22.7 in 2023.

== Over time ==
Incidence of cognizable crimes in India 1953–2007.

A report published by the NCRB compared the crime rates of 1953 and 2006. The report noted that burglary (known as house-breaking in India) declined over a period of 53 years by 79.84% (from 147,379, a rate of 39.3/100,000 in 1953 to 91,666, a rate of 7.9/100,000 in 2006), murder has increased by 7.39% (from 9,803, a rate of 2.61 in 1953 to 32,481, a rate of 2.81/100,000 in 2006).

Kidnapping increased by 47.80% (from 5,261, a rate of 1.40/100,000 in 1953 to 23,991, a rate of 2.07/100,000 in 2006), robbery declined by 28.85% (from 8,407, rate of 2.24/100,000 in 1953 to 18,456, rate of 1.59/100,000 in 2006) and riots have declined by 10.58% (from 20,529, a rate of 5.47/100,000 in 1953 to 56,641, a rate of 4.90/100,000 in 2006).

In 2006, 5,102,460 cognizable crimes were committed including 1,878,293 (IPC) crimes and 3,224,167 Special & Local Laws (SLL) crimes, with an increase of 1.5% over 2005 (50,26,337). IPC crime rate in 2006 was 167.7 compared to 165.3 in 2005 showing an increase of 1.5% in 2006 over 2005. SLL crime rate in 2006 was 287.9 compared to 290.5 in 2005 showing a decline of 0.9% in 2006 over 2005.

Year	Total cog. crimes under IPC, per 100,000	Murder per 100,000	Kidnapping per 100,000	Robbery per 100,000	Burglary (known as house-breaking in India) per 100,000
1953	160.5	2.61	1.40	2.24	39.3
2006	162.3	2.81	2.07	1.60	7.92
% Change in 2006 over 1953	1.1	7.39	47.80	−28.85	−79.84

SOURCE: National Crime Records Bureau

== Crime by location ==
As of 2019, Delhi had the highest crime rate (incidence of crime per 100,000 population) among all States of India at 1586.1, rising steeply from 1342.5. Delhi's crime rate was 4.1 times higher than the national average of 385.5 that year. States in Northeast India have consistently reported much lower crime rates, with 4 of the 5 states having the lowest crime in being from the region in 2018.

In terms of the absolute number of crimes in 2018, Uttar Pradesh reported the most (12.2% of nationally reported crime). Maharashtra, after topping the list over the previous 4-years, Kerala dropped to the third-position in absolute numbers, accounting for 10.1% of all crimes.

The violent crime rate (per 100,000 population) was highest in Assam (86.4), Tripura (62), Haryana (49.4), West Bengal (46.1) and Arunachal Pradesh (41.7). However, in terms of absolute number of cases, Uttar Pradesh reported the highest incidence of violent crimes accounting for 15.2% of total violent crimes in India (65,155 out of 428,134) followed by Maharashtra (10.7%), and Bihar and West Bengal each accounting for 10.4% of such cases.

Absolute number of reported crimes & crime rates across India
State/UT	2016	2017	2018	2019	Percentage share of state/UT (2019)	Crime rate in 2019 (IPC+SLL crimes)
India	4831515	5007044	5074635	5156172	100.0	385.5
Andhra Pradesh	129389	148002	144703	145751	2.8	278.6
Arunachal Pradesh	2700	2746	2817	2877	0.1	190.9
Assam	107014	109952	120572	123783	2.6	385.8
Bihar	189696	236055	262815	269109	5.2	224.0
Chhattisgarh	84192	90516	98233	96561	1.9	334.7
Goa	3706	3943	3884	3727	0.1	241.5
Gujarat	435422	334799	393194	431066	8.4	631.6
Haryana	143111	224816	191229	166336	3.2	577.4
Himachal Pradesh	17249	17796	19594	19924	0.4	272.4
Jammu and Kashmir	26624	25608	27276	25408	0.5	187.8
Jharkhand	47817	52664	55664	62206	1.2	165.5
Karnataka	179479	184063	163416	163691	3.2	248.1
Kerala	707870	653500	512167	453083	8.8	1287.7
Madhya Pradesh	365154	379682	405129	395619	7.7	478.9
Maharashtra	430866	467753	515674	509443	9.9	415.8
Manipur	4098	4250	3781	3661	0.1	117.7
Meghalaya	3582	3952	3482	3897	0.1	120.6
Mizoram	2800	2738	2351	2880	0.1	241.0
Nagaland	1908	1553	1775	1661	0.0	77.1
Odisha	103565	103866	107408	121525	2.4	277.9
Punjab	57739	70673	70318	72855	1.4	243.3
Rajasthan	251147	245553	250546	304394	5.9	392.3
Sikkim	1020	979	869	821	0.0	123.5
Tamil Nadu	467369	420876	499188	455094	8.8	600.3
Telangana	120273	133197	126858	131254	2.5	352.0
Tripura	4081	4238	6078	5988	0.1	149.6
Uttar Pradesh	494025	600082	585157	628578	12.2	278.2
Uttarakhand	16074	28861	34715	28268	0.5	252.8
West Bengal	204400	195537	188063	*****	3.6	193.7
Andaman and Nicobar Islands	2491	3014	3699	4034	0.1	1013.6
Chandigarh	4256	5462	5967	4518	0.1	381.6
Dadra and Nagar Haveli	256	309	315	290	0.0	52.2
Daman and Diu	287	382	334	370	0.0	87.5
Delhi	216920	244714	262612	316261	5.2	1586.1
Lakshadweep	50	114	77	182	0.0	267.6
Puducherry	4885	4799	4674	4004	0.1	264.3

- Due to non-receipt of data from West Bengal in time for 2019, data furnished for 2018 has been used

Sources :

=== Cities ===
Among metropolitan cities, Kolkata (103.4 in 2021) was the safest city, however, the experts doubted the accuracy of the data. After Kolkata, Pune (256.8) and Hyderabad (259.9) had the lowest crime rates (per 1 lakh urban population) among the 19-cities with more than two million inhabitants in India. While almost all major cities have historically had a crime rate higher than that of their domain states, since 2018, Kolkata and Mumbai (309.9) have been the only mega cities to have a lower crime rate than their states, West Bengal and Maharashtra respectively. Among other metropolises, Kozhikode (523.2) and Pune were the only ones to have a lower crime rate than their states. It is generally acknowledged that cities have a greater propensity to crime and that megacities have a higher crime rate than smaller cities.

Delhi (1906.8) remained the most crime ridden urban area in India for the fourth-year as of 2019. Over 82% of the 290,000 crimes in Delhi were thefts which jumped by more than 25% in 2019. In sharp contrast, thefts accounted for just a little over 20% of the 3.2 million crimes registered nationwide. Crime in the capital city has incrementally expanded over the previous years and jumped from 2018 when the rime rate was 1385.1. Despite significantly reducing in scale, the crime rate in Kochi remained the second-highest at 1711.2, mainly due to Kochi Police booking the highest number of rash driving cases in their jurisdiction, 10508 separate cases in 2019. Jaipur (1392.5) had the third-highest crime rate for the second-year, with crimes against women rising fast. The city had the highest rape rate of 35.6 per 100,000 population.

==== Crime in 2020 ====
Sl.No.	City	Murder	Culpable Homicide not amounting to Murder	Infanticide	Foeticide	Dowry Deaths	Attempt to Commit Murder	Attempt to Commit Culpable Homicide	Grievous Hurt	Kidnapping and Abduction	Rape	Attempt to Commit Rape	Rioting	Robbery	Dacoity	Arson	Total Violent Crimes
1	Ahmedabad (Gujarat)	70	12	1	0	0	133	6	213	181	77	0	93	119	23	29	957
2	Bengaluru (Karnataka)	179	10	0	0	28	502	2	213	712	108	5	196	503	32	55	2545
3	Chennai (Tamil Nadu)	150	2	4	0	3	335	9	107	37	31	1	47	658	21	34	1439
4	Coimbatore (Tamil Nadu)	31	0	0	0	0	24	0	19	4	2	0	23	54	3	4	164
5	Delhi City	461	57	3	1	109	562	564	406	4011	967	9	688	1946	9	68	9861
6	Ghaziabad (Uttar Pradesh)	23	6	1	0	11	23	20	57	78	18	0	11	23	2	6	279
7	Hyderabad (Telangana)	71	5	0	0	21	139	7	107	451	92	0	19	81	5	47	1045
8	Indore (Madhya Pradesh)	63	5	0	0	20	78	3	63	466	128	0	21	63	2	27	939
9	Jaipur (Rajasthan)	95	7	0	0	26	85	18	7	532	409	27	26	83	2	16	1333
10	Kanpur (Uttar Pradesh)	41	11	0	0	30	36	24	53	223	42	0	5	8	0	0	473
11	Kochi (Kerala)	9	3	0	0	0	21	58	51	15	43	1	20	61	3	2	287
12	Kolkata (West Bengal)	53	16	0	0	9	121	1	357	308	11	0	69	17	7	12	981
13	Kozhikode (Kerala)	5	4	0	0	0	11	58	45	12	24	2	214	54	4	20	453
14	Lucknow (Uttar Pradesh)	81	28	0	4	48	88	55	243	735	76	4	70	134	2	24	1592
15	Mumbai (Maharashtra)	148	9	1	4	12	348	1	1068	1173	322	0	309	718	15	23	4151
16	Nagpur (Maharashtra)	97	2	2	0	8	121	0	281	334	79	0	103	159	19	23	1228
17	Patna (Bihar)	79	0	0	0	24	705	0	152	427	18	8	146	64	8	0	1631
18	Pune (Maharashtra)	77	8	1	0	6	115	0	273	435	59	0	146	172	8	20	1320
19	Surat (Gujarat)	116	7	0	5	0	82	0	141	163	27	0	58	36	3	9	647
Total Cities		1849	192	13	14	355	3529	826	3856	10297	2533	57	2264	4953	168	419	31325

==== Crime in 2021 ====
Sl. No.	City	Murder	Culpable Homicide not amounting to Murder	Infanticide	Foeticide	Dowry Deaths	Attempt to Commit Murder	Attempt to Commit Culpable Homicide	Grievous Hurt	Kidnapping and Abduction	Rape	Attempt to Commit Rape	Rioting	Robbery	Dacoity	Arson	Total Violent Crimes
1	Ahmedabad (Gujarat)	97	6	0	2	0	120	4	321	183	83	0	42	130	8	26	1022
2	Bengaluru (Karnataka)	155	17	0	0	26	371	9	197	811	117	0	110	505	36	39	2393
3	Chennai (Tamil Nadu)	161	6	5	0	1	304	4	104	71	45	1	100	609	20	19	1450
4	Coimbatore (Tamil Nadu)	30	0	1	0	0	41	0	10	11	12	1	21	94	2	8	231
5	Delhi City	454	59	5	3	136	752	650	392	5475	1226	6	68	2315	25	87	11653
6	Ghaziabad (Uttar Pradesh)	25	8	0	0	18	56	23	82	50	32	7	8	43	1	14	367
7	Hyderabad (Telangana)	98	12	0	0	15	192	5	119	513	116	0	11	81	11	59	1232
8	Indore (Madhya Pradesh)	54	13	0	0	17	93	2	100	694	165	1	30	81	7	35	1292
9	Jaipur (Rajasthan)	118	6	0	0	34	87	22	6	613	502	29	28	135	6	15	1601
10	Kanpur (Uttar Pradesh)	48	7	0	0	32	28	18	51	152	35	0	6	10	2	0	389
11	Kochi (Kerala)	10	7	0	0	1	23	54	50	13	73	4	5	43	3	3	289
12	Kolkata (West Bengal)	45	16	0	0	5	135	6	388	346	11	0	86	20	3	19	1080
13	Kozhikode (Kerala)	5	2	0	0	0	11	52	44	21	37	1	166	62	4	11	416
14	Lucknow (Uttar Pradesh)	101	18	0	0	51	94	26	267	773	97	5	64	122	4	14	1636
15	Mumbai (Maharashtra)	162	6	0	1	12	349	8	1219	1590	364	0	303	861	16	35	4926
16	Nagpur (Maharashtra)	95	6	0	0	0	119	0	308	415	115	1	106	190	13	41	1409
17	Patna (Bihar)	76	4	0	0	20	219	0	321	549	30	0	189	85	5	0	1498
18	Pune (Maharashtra)	100	1	1	0	4	299	2	250	571	96	0	197	318	38	21	1898
19	Surat (Gujarat)	121	5	2	0	3	74	12	174	270	52	0	17	39	10	11	790
Total Cities		1955	199	14	6	375	3367	897	4403	13121	3208	56	1557	5743	214	457	35572

== Organized crime ==
=== Arms trafficking ===
According to a joint report published by Oxfam, Amnesty International and the International Action Network on Small Arms (IANSA) in 2006, there are around 40 million illegal small arms in India out of approximately 75 million in worldwide circulation. Majority of the illegal small arms make its way into the states of Bihar, Chhattisgarh, Uttar Pradesh, Jharkhand, Orissa and Madhya Pradesh. In UP, a used AK-47 costs $3,800 in black market. Large amount of illegal small arms are manufactured in various illegal arms factories in Uttar Pradesh and Bihar and sold on the black market for as little as $5.08.

Chinese pistols are in demand in the illegal small arms market in India because they are easily available and cheaper. This trend poses a significant problem for the states of Bihar, Uttar Pradesh, Jharkhand, Chhattisgarh, Orissa, Maharashtra, West Bengal, Karnataka and Andhra Pradesh which have influence of Naxalism. The porous Indo-Nepal border is an entry point for Chinese pistols, AK-47 and M-16 rifles into India as these arms are used by the Naxalites who have ties to Maoists in Nepal.

In North-East India, there is a huge influx of small arms due to the insurgent groups operating there. The small arms in North-East India come from insurgent groups in Burma, black markets in Southeast Asia, Pakistan, Bangladesh, Nepal and Sri Lanka, black market in Cambodia, the People's Republic of China, insurgent groups like the Liberation Tigers of Tamil Eelam, the Communist Party of India (Maoist), the Communist Party of Nepal (Maoist Centre), Indian states like Uttar Pradesh and pilferages from legal gun factories, criminal organizations operating in India and South Asian countries another international markets like Romania, Germany etc. Illegal weaponry found in North-East India includes small arms such as the M14, M16, AK-47, AK-56, and the AK-74, but also light machine guns, Chinese hand grenades, mines, rocket-propelled grenade launchers and submachine guns etc.

The Ministry of External Affairs and Ministry of Home Affairs drafted a joint proposal to the United Nations, seeking a global ban on small-arms sales to non-state users.

=== Cyber crime ===
The Information Technology Act 2000 was passed by the Parliament of India in May 2000, aiming to curb cyber crimes and provide a legal framework for e-commerce transactions. However Pavan Duggal, lawyer of Supreme Court of India and cyber law expert, viewed "The IT Act, 2000, is primarily meant to be a legislation to promote e-commerce. It is not very effective in dealing with several emerging cyber crimes like cyber harassment, defamation, stalking and so on". Although cyber crime cells have been set up in major cities, Duggal noted the problem is that most cases remain unreported due to a lack of awareness.

In 2001, India and United States had set up an India-US cyber security forum as part of a counter-terrorism dialogue.

In 2021, according to NCRB data, 52,974 cyber crime cases were registered in India, a rise of 5% compared to 2020 (50,035) cases. Telangana reported highest number of cyber crimes in India with 10,303 cases, followed by Uttar Pradesh (8,829) and Karnataka (8,136) in the number of cyber crimes reported, while Karnataka registered highest number of cyber crimes against women.

In 2021, the motive behind 60.8% of the cyber crimes was fraud, followed by sexual exploitation in 8.6% (4,555) cases and extortion in 5.4% (2,883) cases.

India ranked second globally in terms of cyber crimes on health systems in 2021, according to a report by CloudSEK, a company which predicts cyber threats. The breached data included vaccination records, personally identifiable information, like name, address, email, contact number, and gender, and log in details of hospitals. Such attacks can also shut down equipment during surgery or in intensive care units.

=== Human trafficking ===
Human trafficking in India is a serious issue. It usually comes in the form of offering employment to the poor and uneducated. Women are sold to brothels or families as maids, where they are usually raped, tortured and sexually assaulted. In 2021, India has passed a bill for fighting human trafficking. According to National Crime Records Bureau, 2,189 cases of human trafficking were registered in 2021 as compared to 1,714 in 2020. Among states, Telangana (347) reported highest number of cases, followed by Maharashtra (320) and Assam (203). 1,21,351 children were missing as of 2021 data, many of them potential victims of human trafficking.

=== Illegal drug trade ===
India is located between two major illicit opium producing centers in Asia – the Golden Crescent comprising Pakistan, Afghanistan and Iran and the Golden Triangle comprising Burma, Thailand and Laos. Because of such geographical location, India experiences large amount of drug trafficking through the borders. India is the world's largest producer of licit opium for the pharmaceutical trade. But an undetermined quantity of opium is diverted to illicit international drug markets.

India is a transshipment point for heroin from Southwest Asian countries like Afghanistan and Pakistan and from Southeast Asian countries like Burma, Laos, and Thailand. Heroin is smuggled from Pakistan and Burma, with some quantities transshipped through Nepal. Most heroin shipped from India are destined for Europe. There have been reports of heroin smuggled from Mumbai to Nigeria for further export.

In Maharashtra, Mumbai is an important center for distribution of drug. The most commonly used drug in Mumbai is Indian heroin (called desi mal by the local population). Both public transportation (road and rail transportation) and private transportation are used for this drug trade.

Drug trafficking affects the country in many ways.

- Drug abuse: Cultivation of illicit narcotic substances and drug trafficking affects the health of the individuals and destroy the economic structure of the family and society.
- Organised crime: Drug trafficking results in growth of organized crime which affects social security. Organized crime connects drug trafficking with corruption and money laundering.
- Political instability: Drug trafficking also aggravates the political instability in Northwest and Northeast India.

A survey conducted in 2003–2004 by Narcotics Control Bureau found that India has at least four million drug addicts. The most common drugs used in India are cannabis, hashish, opium and heroin. In 2006 alone, India's law enforcing agencies recovered 230 kg heroin and 203 kg of cocaine. In an annual government report in 2007, the United States named India among 20 major hubs for trafficking of illegal drugs along with Pakistan, Afghanistan and Burma. However, studies reveal that most of the criminals caught in this crime are either Nigerian or US nationals.

Several measures have been taken by the Government of India to combat drug trafficking in the country. India is a party of the Single Convention on Narcotic Drugs (1961), the Convention on Psychotropic Substances (1971), the Protocol Amending the Single Convention on Narcotic Drugs (1972) and the United Nations Convention Against Illicit Traffic in Narcotic Drugs and Psychotropic Substances (1988). An Indo-Pakistani committee was set up in 1986 to prevent trafficking in narcotic drugs. India signed a convention with the United Arab Emirates in 1994 to control drug trafficking. In 1995, India signed an agreement with Egypt for investigation of drug cases and exchange of information and a memorandum of understanding of the Prevention of Illicit Trafficking in Drugs with Iran.

=== Poaching and wildlife trafficking ===
Illegal wildlife trade in India has increased.

According to a report published by the Environmental Investigation Agency (EIA) in 2004, India is the chief target for the traders of wildlife skin. Between 1994 and 2003, there have been 784 cases where the skins of tiger, leopard or otter have been seized. Leopards, rhinoceros, reptiles, birds, insects, rare species of plants are being smuggled into the countries in Southeast Asia and the People's Republic of China. Between 1994 and 2003, poaching and seizure of 698 otters have been documented in India.

Kathmandu is a key staging point for illegal skins smuggled from India bound for Tibet and PRC. The report by EIA noted there has been a lack of cross-border cooperation between India, Nepal and the People's Republic of China to coordinate enforcement operations and lack of political will to treat wildlife crime effectively. The poaching of elephants is a significant problem in Southern India and in the North-Eastern states of Nagaland and Mizoram. In 2015-17, Operation Shikkar led to the arrest of 72 individuals and the seizure of 464 kg of ivory.

The majority of tiger poaching happen in Madhya Pradesh, Uttar Pradesh, Orissa, West Bengal, Assam and Arunachal Pradesh. There was a famous leopard poaching case at Mankulam in Kerala in 2021. Following is a comparison of reported cases of tiger and leopard poaching from 1998 to 2003:

Year	1998	1999	2000	2001	2002	2003
Reported cases of tiger poaching	14	38	39	35	47	8
Reported cases of leopard poaching	28	80	201	69	87	15

Samir Sinha, head of TRAFFIC India, the wildlife trade monitoring arm of the World Wide Fund for Nature (WWF) and the World Conservation Union (IUCN), told Reuters in an interview "The situation regarding the illegal trade in wildlife parts in India is very grim. It is a vast, a varied trade ranging from smuggling of rare medicinal plants to butterflies to peafowl to tigers and it is difficult to predict how big it is, but the threats and dimensions suggest that the trade is increasing".

Project Tiger, a wildlife conservation project, was initiated in 1972 and was launched by Indira Gandhi on 1 April 1973. With 23 tiger reserves, Project Tiger claimed to have succeeded. But according to critics like conservationist Billy Arjan Singh, temporary increases in tiger population were caused by immigration due to destruction of habitat in Nepal, not because of the widely acclaimed success of wildlife policy in India.

== Crimes against women ==
Police records shows high incidence of crimes against women in India. Sexual assault against women in India is increasingly common. Despite a large population, statistically sexual assault in India is not rampant. According to the NCRB, as of 2018, the majority of crimes against women were registered under 'Cruelty by Husband or His Relatives' (31.9%) followed by 'Assault on Women with Intent to Outrage her Modesty' (27.6%), 'Kidnapping & Abduction of Women' (22.5%) and 'Rape' (10.3%). The crime rate per lakh women population was 58.8 in 2018, as compared to 57.9 in 2017.

=== Domestic violence ===
Domestic violence in India is endemic. Around 70% of women in India are victims of domestic violence, according to Renuka Chowdhury, former Union minister for Women and Child Development.

The National Crime Records Bureau reveals that a crime against a woman is committed every three minutes, a woman is raped every 29 minutes, a dowry death occurs every 77 minutes, and one case of cruelty committed by either the husband or relative of the husband occurs every nine minutes. This occurs despite the fact that women in India are legally protected from domestic abuse under the Protection of Women from Domestic Violence Act.

=== Dowry ===
Dowries are considered a major contributor towards the violence against women in India. Some of these offences include physical violence, emotional abuses, and murder of brides and girls.

Most dowry deaths occur when the young woman commits suicide due to persistent harassment related to dowry disputes. Most of these suicides are by hanging, poisoning or by fire. Sometimes the woman is killed by setting her on fire – this is known as bride burning, and is sometimes disguised as suicide or accident. In 2012, 8,233 dowry death cases were reported across India. Dowry issues caused 1.4 deaths per year per 100,000 women in India.

=== Rape ===
Rape in India has been described by Radha Kumar as one of India's most common crimes against women. Official sources show that rape cases in India have doubled between 1990 and 2008. While already on an upward curve, rape cases suddenly spiked in 2013. Disturbing incidents of rape on senior citizens and infants are increasingly common. The incidence of rape had gone up significantly during the COVID-19 pandemic in India.

As of 2018, rape was the fourth most common crime against women with the number of registered rape cases rising from 32,559 in 2017 to 33,356. Of these, 31,320 cases (93.9%) had a culprit who was known to the victim. The states which saw the highest absolute number of rapes were Madhya Pradesh (5,433 or 16.3% of all cases), Rajasthan (4,355 or 13%), Uttar Pradesh (3,946 or 11.8%), Maharashtra (2,142 or 6.4%) and Chhattisgarh (2,091 or 6%).

In 2018, the national average rape rate (per 1,00,000 population) was 5.2, same as the previous year. Tamil Nadu (0.9), Nagaland (1.0) and Bihar (1.1) had the lowest rape rates while Chhattisgarh (14.7) had the highest rape rate.

== Crime and misconduct by police ==
=== Police corruption ===
Corruption is widespread in India. It is prevalent within every section and every level of the society. Corruption has taken the role of a pervasive aspect of Indian politics. In India, corruption takes the form of bribes, evasion of tax and exchange controls, embezzlement, etc. In 2006, seven policemen were charge sheeted and eleven were convicted for custodial misconduct. Jan Lokpal Bill is being planned to reduce the corruption.

=== Police misconduct ===
Despite state prohibitions against torture and custodial misconduct by the police, torture is widespread in police custody, which is a major reason behind deaths in custody. The police often torture innocent people until a 'confession' is obtained to save influential and wealthy offenders. G.P. Joshi, the programme coordinator of the Indian branch of the Commonwealth Human Rights Initiative in New Delhi comments that the main issue at hand concerning police violence is a lack of accountability of the police.

=== Policing reforms ===
In 2006, the Supreme Court of India in a judgment in the Prakash Singh vs. Union of India case, ordered central and state governments with seven directives to begin the process of police reform. The main objectives of this set of directives was twofold, providing tenure to and streamlining the appointment/transfer processes of policemen, and increasing the accountability of the police.

== Other crimes ==
=== Petty crime ===
Petty crime, like pickpocketing, theft of valuables from luggage on trains and buses have been reported. Travelers who are not in groups become easy victims of pickpockets and purse snatchers. Purse snatchers work in crowded areas.

=== Confidence tricks ===
Many scams are perpetrated against foreign travelers, especially in Jaipur, the capital of Rajasthan. Scammers usually target younger foreign tourists and suggest to them that money can be made by privately transporting gems or gold, or by taking delivery abroad of expensive carpets, avoiding customs duties.

Such incidents occupy the traveler for several days. The traveler is then passed to a new scam artist who offers to show the foreign traveler the sights. Scam artists also offer cheap lodgings and meals to foreign travelers so they can place him or her in the scam artist's physical custody and thus make the foreigner vulnerable to threats and physical coercion. In the process, the foreigner loses his passport.

In addition, there are unofficial guides at crowded transportation hubs and at tourist attractions. A common ruse at transportation hubs is claiming that there is no commute to a destination and tyring to convince taking their private transport or an expensive stay where they get a cut. Unofficial guides at tourist places could be temples, mosques, or notable places (e.g.,Varanasi Ghat), they often.provide unsolicited services and then ask to pay for them.

=== Taxi scams ===
There are also taxi scams present in India, whereby a foreign traveler, who is not aware of the locations around Indian airports, is taken for a ride round the whole airport and charged for full-fare taxi ride while the terminal is only few hundred yards away. The Overseas Security Advisory Council in a report mentioned the process about how to avoid taxi-scam. This crime is known in other areas of the world as "long-hauling".

== Crime prevention ==
Crime prevention is critical to maintain law and order in the country. Deterring criminals through deployment of more police is one of the major strategy practiced. However, their relationship is very complex. There are also other reasons such as unemployment, poverty and a lower per capita income which can affect the crime rates in India.

== See also ==
- Law enforcement in India
- Crime and Criminal Tracking Network and Systems
- Indian Penal Code
- Organised crime in India
- List of scandals in India
- Kala Kachcha gang
- Mafia Raj
- Terrorism in India
- Caste-related violence in India
- Religious violence in India
- Rape in India
