= J. N. Saksena =

Indian police officer

- Born: India
- Died: 9 December 2010
- Occupation: Police official
- Awards: Padma Shri

Jitendra Narain Saksena was an Indian Police official, known for his contributions in combating militancy in Kashmir during late Eighties and early Nineties. He was the Director General of Police of the Indian state of Jammu and Kashmir from December 1989 to January 1992. He was reportedly targeted by the militants and was injured by a bomb blast that took place at his office on 24 January 1992, injuring four other senior police officials as well. The Government of India awarded him the fourth highest civilian honour of the Padma Shri in 1992. He died on 9 December 2010.

== See also ==
- Insurgency in Jammu and Kashmir
