= Crime and Criminal Tracking Network and Systems =

Indian government project on police tracking

Crime and Criminal Tracking Networks and Systems
Agency overview
- Formed: 19 June 2009; 17 years ago
- Jurisdiction: Government of India
- Headquarters: East Block-7, R.K. Puram, New Delhi
- Motto: e-Governance
- Annual budget: ₹250 crore (US$26.0 million) (FY2016-17)
- Parent department: Ministry of Home Affairs (MHA)
- Website: ncrb.gov.in/en/crime-and-criminal-tracking-network-systems-cctns

The Crime and Criminal Tracking Network and Systems (CCTNS) is an Indian government project for creating a comprehensive and integrated system for effective policing through e-Governance. The system includes a nationwide online tracking system by integrating more than 14,000 police stations across the country. The project is implemented by National Crime Records Bureau.

== History ==
The concept of CCTNS was first conceived in the year 2008 by the then Home Minister, P. Chidambaram in the aftermath of the 2008 Mumbai attacks. This was then approved by the Cabinet Committee on Economic Affairs (CCEA) in 2009 and was allocated a fund of Rs. 2,000 crore. A pilot phase of the project was launched on 4 January 2013 by the then Home Minister Sushilkumar Shinde.

== Key features ==
=== Integrated crime records system ===
CCTNS aims to integrate all the data and records of crime into a Core Application Software (CAS), which is presently spreading across 28 states and 8 union territories of India. CAS was developed by the Bangalore-based IT firm, Wipro. It needs to integrate different software and platforms followed by different states and to digitize records of those states which have not digitized their police records. The project also involves training of police personnel and setting up of citizen portal to provide services to citizens.

Crime and Criminals Tracking Network and Systems (CCTNS)

- The Project will interconnect about 15000 Police Stations and additional 5000 offices of supervisory police officers across the country
- It will digitize data related to FIR registration, investigation, and charge sheets in all police stations.
- It would help in developing a national database of crime and criminals
- The full implementation of the project with all the new components would lead to a central citizen portal having linkages with State-level citizen portals that will provide a number of citizen-friendly services.
- The total outlay for the project is 2000 crore rupees, and also includes the Operation and Maintenance phase for additional five years up to March 2022.

=== Interoperable Criminal Justice System (ICJS) ===
The CCEA also decided to implement Interoperable Criminal Justice System (ICJS) by 2017. It will be done through integrating CCTNS with e-Courts, e-Prisons, Forensics, and Prosecution, which are the key components of the Criminal Justice System. e-prosecution in Delhi has already been launched by the ICJS team.

Implementation of ICJS will ensure

- Quick data transfer among different pillars of the criminal justice system, which will not only enhance transparency but also reduce processing time.
- Enable National level crime analytics to be published at an increased frequency, which will help the policymakers as well as lawmakers in taking appropriate and timely action.
- Enable pan-India criminal/accused name search in the regional language for improved inter-state tracking of criminal movement.

== See also ==
- Crime reporting and tracking
  - Bureau of Police Research and Development (BPRD)
  - Call 112
  - Criminal record
  - Law enforcement in India
  - National Crime Records Bureau (NCRB)
  - Sex offender registry (SOR)
  - United Nations Office on Drugs and Crime (UNODC)
- Other police-related
  - Indian Police Foundation and Institute
  - Sardar Vallabhbhai Patel National Police Academy
