= National Crime Records Bureau =

Indian government agency

Agency overview
- Formed: 11 March 1986; 40 years ago
- Jurisdiction: Government of India
- Headquarters: New Delhi, Delhi, India
- Motto: Empowering Indian Police with Information Technology
- Agency executive: Alok Ranjan, Director
- Parent department: Ministry of Home Affairs
- Key document: Creation of NCRB (Notification)
- Website: ncrb.gov.in

The National Crime Records Bureau (NCRB) is an Indian government agency responsible for collecting and analyzing crime data, as defined by the Indian Penal Code (IPC) and Special and Local Laws (SLL). NCRB is headquartered in New Delhi and is part of the Ministry of Home Affairs (MHA).

== History ==
=== 1986: inception ===
NCRB was set up in 1986 to function as a repository of information on crime and criminals, to assist investigators in linking crime to the perpetrators. It was set up based on the recommendation of the Task force 1985 and the National Police Commission 1977, by merging the Directorate of Coordination and Police Computer (DCPC) with the Inter-State Criminals Data Branch and the Central Fingerprint Bureau of the Central Bureau of Investigation (CBI). The statistical branch of the Bureau of Police Research and Development (BPR&D) was previously also merged with the NCRB, but was later de-merged.

=== 2022: National Automated Fingerprint Identification System ===
A 10-digit National Fingerprint Number (NFN) is assigned by National Automated Fingerprint Identification System NAFIS to every individual who is arrested for a crime. Different offenses reported under various first information reports will be associated with the same NFN, and this unique ID would be used for the individual's lifetime. The first two digits of the ID will be the state code where the individual who was arrested for a crime is registered, and then a sequence number. The Crime and Criminal Tracking Network & Systems database is linked to NAFIS.

On 17 August 2022, in New Delhi, Home Minister Amit Shah launched the National Automated Fingerprint Identification System (NAFIS). The NCRB is in charge of its development and administration. The NAFIS is a searchable database of fingerprints linked to illegal activity and crime nationwide. It is a 24/7 service which allows law enforcement authorities to upload, trace, and retrieve data from the database in real time. Madhya Pradesh was the first state to use the NAFIS to identify a deceased individual in April 2022. In order to create a national database of criminal fingerprints, the NCRB supplied equipment to all Districts, the Police Commissionerate, the State Fingerprint Bureaux, the Central Fingerprint Bureau, and Central Law Enforcement Agencies. NAFIS is connected with the Fingerprint Identification System of every State and union territory. As a result of NAFIS's implementation, a searchable national repository including 1.06 crore criminal fingerprint records as of 31 October 2024, is now available to authorized users.

== See also ==
- Crime and Criminal Tracking Network and Systems
- Crime in India
