= 2021 Andhra Pradesh local elections =

Elections to Local Bodies in Andhra Pradesh in 2021

2021 Andhra Pradesh local body elections
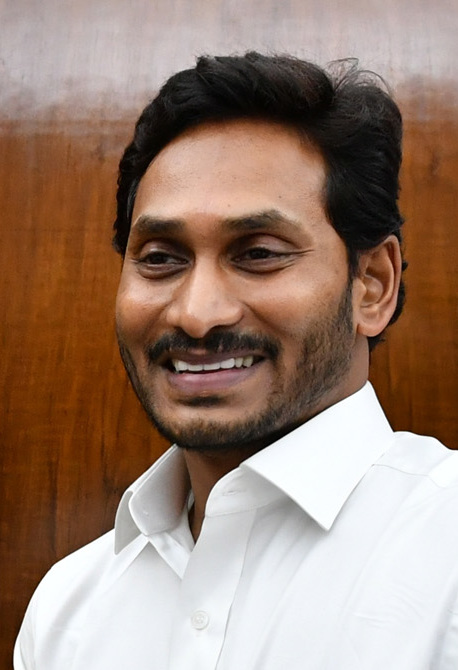

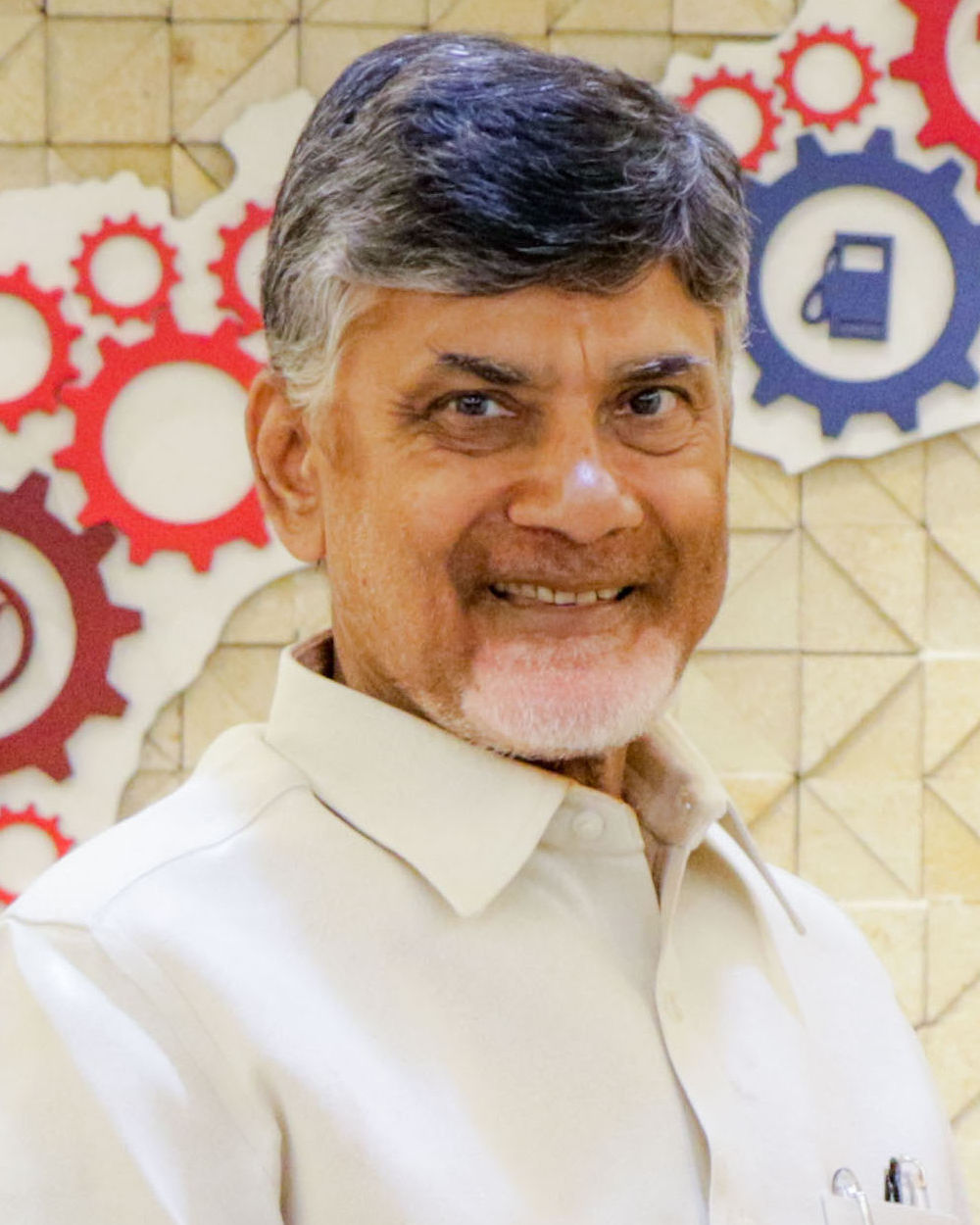

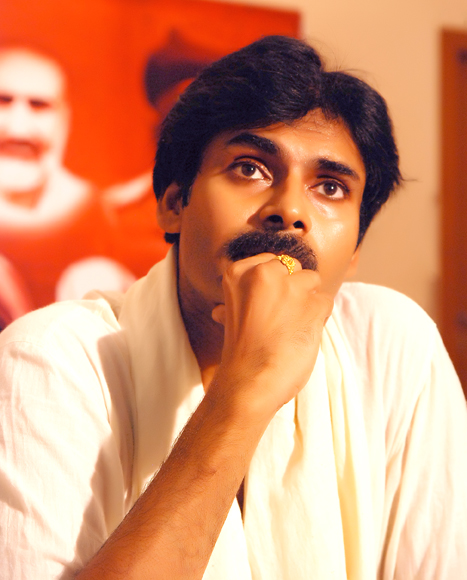
Party	YSR Congress Party	Telugu Desam Party	Janasena Party
Alliance	None	None	NDA

Elections to local bodies in Andhra Pradesh are being held in four phases in rural areas (panchayats) in February 2021 viz. 9 February 2021, 13 February 2021, 17 February 2021 and 21 February 2021 covering 13 districts. In the first phase, 29,732 polling stations were set up.

Urban local body elections to 12 municipal corporations and 75 municipal and town councils will be held on 10 March, with a possible second round on 13 March.

Elections in the state to district and township panchayats will be scheduled at a later date.

== Parties and alliances ==
Alliance/Party		Flag	Symbol	Leader
YSR Congress Party				Y. S. Jagan Mohan Reddy
Telugu Desam Party				N. Chandrababu Naidu
NDA	Janasena Party			Pawan Kalyan
NDA	Bharatiya Janata Party			Somu Veerraju
Communist Party of India (Marxist)				
Communist Party of India				
Indian National Congress				Sake Sailajanath

== Rural local bodies ==
=== Election schedule ===
State Election Commission, headed by N. Ramesh Kumar, appointed K. Kanna Babu, IAS as Secretary of SEC and N. Sanjay, IPS to provide leadership for local elections.

==== Phase 1 ====
Local Body Election Event	Date
Election Date Announcement	29 January 2021
Last Date for Filling Nominations	31 January 2021
Scrutiny	1 February 2021
Withdrawal Last Date	4 February 2021
Voting	9 February 2021
Results	10 February 2021 (Total)

==== Phase 2 ====
Local Body Election Event	Date
Election Date Announcement	2 February 2021
Last Date for Filling Nominations	4 February 2021
Scrutiny	5 February 2021
Withdrawal Last Date	8 February 2021
Voting	13 February 2021
Results	14 February 2021 (Total)

==== Phase 3 ====
Local Body Election Event	Date
Election Date Announcement	6 February 2021
Last Date for Filling Nominations	8 February 2021
Scrut	9 February 2021
Withdrawal Last Date	12 February 2021
Voting	17 February 2021
Results	18 February 2021 (total)

==== Phase 4 ====
Local Body Election Event	Date
Election Date Announcement	10 February 2021
Last Date for Filling Nominations	12 February 2021
Scrutiny	13 February 2021
Withdrawal Last Date	16 February 2021
Voting	21 February 2021
Results	22 February 2021 (total)

=== Elections held ===
==== Phase 1 ====
District	No. of Grama Panchayatis	No. of Wards	Voting Turnout
Anantapuramu	169	1715	
Chittoor	454	4142	79.33%
East Godavari	366	4100	82.81%
Guntur	337	3442	
Kadapa	206	2068	
Krishna	234	2502	86.06%
Kurnool	193	1922	
Nellore	163	1566	
Prakasam	229	2344	
Srikakulam	319	2920	75.77%
Visakhapatnam	340	3250	84.23%
Vizianagaram	0	0	No election held
West Godavari	239	2552	80.29%
Total	3249	32502	81.78%

==== Phase 2 ====
In the second phase, 539 sarpanch seats have been unanimously won, So, there is no election in those grama panchayatis. The elections were held in 18 revenue divisions and 167 mandals.

District	No. of Grama Panchayatis	No. of Wards	Voting Turnout
Anantapuramu	310		84.65%
Chittoor	276		77.20%
East Godavari	247		
Guntur	236		85.51%
Kadapa	175		80.47%
Krishna	211		84.12%
Kurnool	240		80.76%
Nellore	194		78.04%
Prakasam	277		86.93%
Srikakulam	278		
Visakhapatnam	261		
Vizianagaram	415		
West Godavari	210		81.75%
Total	3328	20	81.61%

=== Gram Panchayati ===
Gram Panchayati	Total Wards	YSRCP	TDP	JSP+BJP	Elected Sarpanch
Sirvel Panchayat	18				L.Salamama
Govindapalli Panchayat	14				N.Mariyamma
Yeraguntla Panchayat	14	12	2	0	Ayyaloori Subhan Ali

=== Election results ===
==== District-wise ====
===== Anantapuramu =====
Party	Phase (Sarpanch only)			
Party	1	2	3	4
Party	Seats won	Seats won	Seats won	Seats won
Yuvajana Sramika Rythu Congress Party	145	247	302	156
Telugu Desam Party	22	55	74	26
Janasena Party				
Bharatiya Janata Party	52			
Independents + Others				

===== Chittoor =====
Party	Phase (Sarpanch only)			
Party	1	2	3	4
Party	Seats won	Seats won	Seats won	Seats won
Yuvajana Sramika Rythu Congress Party	362	232	237	330
Telugu Desam Party	81	39	26	57
Janasena Party				
Bharatiya Janata Party				
Independents + Others				

===== East Godavari =====
Party	Phase (Sarpanch only)			
Party	1	2	3	4
Party	Seats won	Seats won	Seats won	Seats won
Yuvajana Sramika Rythu Congress Party	308	187	141	169
Telugu Desam Party	36	24	26	57
Janasena Party				
Bharatiya Janata Party				
Independents + Others				

===== Guntur =====
Party	Phase (Sarpanch only)			
Party	1	2	3	4
Party	Seats won	Seats won	Seats won	Seats won
Yuvajana Sramika Rythu Congress Party	263	188	130	189
Telugu Desam Party	62	44	3	68
Janasena Party				
Bharatiya Janata Party				
Independents + Others				

===== Kadapa =====
Party	Phase (Sarpanch only)			
Party	1	2	3	4
Party	Seats won	Seats won	Seats won	Seats won
Yuvajana Sramika Rythu Congress Party	179	154	164	210
Telugu Desam Party	25	19	23	0
Janasena Party				
Bharatiya Janata Party				
Independents + Others				

===== Krishna =====
Party	Phase (Sarpanch only)			
Party	1	2	3	4
Party	Seats won	Seats won	Seats won	Seats won
Yuvajana Sramika Rythu Congress Party	100	148	159	222
Telugu Desam Party	127	36	48	56
Janasena Party				
Bharatiya Janata Party				
Independents + Others				

===== Kurnool =====
Party	Phase (Sarpanch only)			
Party	1	2	3	4
Party	Seats won	Seats won	Seats won	Seats won
Yuvajana Sramika Rythu Congress Party	160	184	189	233
Telugu Desam Party	33	41	50	50
Janasena Party				
Bharatiya Janata Party				
Independents + Others				

===== Nellore =====
Party	Phase (Sarpanch only)			
Party	1	2	3	4
Party	Seats won	Seats won	Seats won	Seats won
Yuvajana Sramika Rythu Congress Party	137	162	280	210
Telugu Desam Party	23	27	57	22
Janasena Party				
Bharatiya Janata Party				
Independents + Others				

===== Prakasam =====
Party	Phase (Sarpanch only)			
Party	1	2	3	4
Party	Seats won	Seats won	Seats won	Seats won
Yuvajana Sramika Rythu Congress Party	177	238	251	181
Telugu Desam Party	46	37	47	25
Janasena Party				
Bharatiya Janata Party				
Independents + Others				

===== Srikakulam =====
Party	Phase (Sarpanch only)			
Party	1	2	3	4
Party	Seats won	Seats won	Seats won	Seats won
Yuvajana Sramika Rythu Congress Party	267	244	234	216
Telugu Desam Party	50	29	54	54
Janasena Party				
Bharatiya Janata Party				
Independents + Others				

===== Visakhapatnam =====
Party	Phase (Sarpanch only)			
Party	1	2	3	4
Party	Seats won	Seats won	Seats won	Seats won
Yuvajana Sramika Rythu Congress Party	275	194	180	90
Telugu Desam Party	56	59	46	23
Janasena Party				
Bharatiya Janata Party				
Independents + Others				

===== Vizianagaram =====
Party	Phase (Sarpanch only)			
Party	1	2	3	4
Party	Seats won	Seats won	Seats won	Seats won
Yuvajana Sramika Rythu Congress Party	No election held	315	208	245
Telugu Desam Party	No election held	74	36	48
Janasena Party	No election held			
Bharatiya Janata Party	No election held			
Independents + Others	No election held			

===== West Godavari =====
Party	Phase (Sarpanch only)			
Party	1	2	3	4
Party	Seats won	Seats won	Seats won	Seats won
Yuvajana Sramika Rythu Congress Party	173	161	129	194
Telugu Desam Party	35	39	36	58
Janasena Party				
Bharatiya Janata Party				
Independents + Others	1			

==== Overall ====
Party		Symbol	Seats won					
Party		Symbol	Sarpanch					Ward (Total)
Party		Symbol	Phase 1	Phase 2	Phase 3	Phase 4	Total	Ward (Total)
	Yuvajana Sramika Rythu Congress Party		2640	2654	2604	2638	10536	
	Telugu Desam Party + Communist Party of India		510	534	527	528	2099	
	Janasena Party						137	
	Bharatiya Janata Party						81	
	Indian National Congress Party						2	
-	Independents + Others	Steady					1	

== Urban local bodies ==
The urban local body elections in Andhra Pradesh, originally scheduled for 23 March 2020, were postponed on 15 March 2020 due to the COVID-19 pandemic in India. The election process resumed in March 2021 from the stage at which it has been suspended, using the nominations previously filed. Polling was scheduled for 10 March 2021 in 12 Municipal corporations, 75 Municipalities and Nagar panchayats.

In November 2021, elections to 1 Municipal corporation, 12 Municipalities and Nagar panchayats were held.

=== Schedule ===
Poll event	Date
Date of announcement	11 March 2020
Last date for filing nomination	13 March 2020
Scrutiny of nomination	14 March 2020
Last date for withdrawal of nomination	3 March 2021
Date of poll	10 March 2021
Date of re-poll, if any	13 March 2021
Date of counting of votes	14 March 2021

=== Results by mayors/chairpersons ===
Urban local body	Total								
Urban local body	Total	YSRCP	TDP	NDA		CPI(M)	CPI	INC	Others
Urban local body	Total	YSRCP	TDP	JSP	BJP	CPI(M)	CPI	INC	Others
Municipal Corporations	13	13	0	0	0	0	0	0	0
Municipalities	59	57	2	0	0	0	0	0	0
Nagar Panchayats	28	27	1	0	0	0	0	0	0
Total	100	97	3	0	0	0	0	0	0

=== Results by wards ===
==== Municipal Corporations ====
Phase	District	Municipal Corporation	Wards								
Phase	District	Municipal Corporation	Wards	YSRCP	TDP	NDA		CPI(M)	CPI	INC	Others
Phase	District	Municipal Corporation	Wards	YSRCP	TDP	JSP	BJP	CPI(M)	CPI	INC	Others
March 2021	Visakhapatnam	Greater Visakhapatnam	98	58	30	3	1	1	1	0	4
March 2021	Krishna	Vijayawada	64	49	14	0	0	1	0	0	0
March 2021	Guntur	Guntur	57	44	9	2	0	0	0	0	2
March 2021	Chittoor	Tirupati	50	48	1	0	0	0	0	0	0
March 2021	Kurnool	Kurnool	52	41	8	0	0	0	0	0	3
March 2021	Prakasam	Ongole	50	41	6	1	0	0	0	0	2
March 2021	Krishna	Machilipatnam	50	44	5	1	0	0	0	0	0
March 2021	Kadapa	Kadapa	50	48	1	0	0	0	0	0	1
March 2021	Vizianagaram	Vizianagaram	50	48	1	0	0	0	0	0	1
March 2021	Anantapuramu	Anantapuramu	50	48	0	0	0	0	0	0	2
March 2021	West Godavari	Eluru	50	47	3	0	0	0	0	0	0
March 2021	Chittoor	Chittoor	50	46	3	0	0	0	0	0	1
September 2021	Nellore	Nellore	54	54	0	0	0	0	0	0	0
Total			725	618	81	7	1	1	1	0	16

==== Municipalities and Nagar Panchayats ====
Phase	District	Municipality/Nagar Panchayat	Wards								
Phase	District	Municipality/Nagar Panchayat	Wards	YSRCP	TDP	NDA		CPI(M)	CPI	INC	Others
Phase	District	Municipality/Nagar Panchayat	Wards	YSRCP	TDP	JSP	BJP	CPI(M)	CPI	INC	Others
March 2021	Srikakulam	Ichchapuram	23	15	6	0	0	0	0	0	2
March 2021	Srikakulam	Palasa–Kasibugga	31	22	8	0	0	0	0	0	0
March 2021	Srikakulam	Palakonda	20	15	3	0	0	0	0	0	0
March 2021	Vizianagaram	Bobbili	31	18	11	0	0	0	0	0	1
March 2021	Vizianagaram	Parvathipuram	30	22	5	0	0	0	0	0	3
March 2021	Vizianagaram	Salur	29	20	5	0	0	0	0	1	3
March 2021	Vizianagaram	Nellimarla	20	11	7	0	0	0	0	0	2
March 2021	Visakhapatnam	Narsipatnam	28	14	12	1	0	0	0	0	1
March 2021	Visakhapatnam	Elamanchili	25	23	1	0	0	0	0	0	1
March 2021	East Godavari	Amalapuram	30	19	4	6	0	0	0	0	1
March 2021	East Godavari	Tuni	30	30	0	0	0	0	0	0	0
March 2021	East Godavari	Pithapuram	30	20	6	0	0	0	0	0	4
March 2021	East Godavari	Samalkota	31	29	2	0	0	0	0	0	0
March 2021	East Godavari	Mandapeta	30	22	7	0	0	0	0	0	1
March 2021	East Godavari	Ramachandrapuram	28	24	1	1	0	0	0	0	2
March 2021	East Godavari	Peddapuram	29	26	2	1	0	0	0	0	0
March 2021	East Godavari	Yeleswaram	20	16	4	0	0	0	0	0	0
March 2021	East Godavari	Gollaprolu	20	18	2	0	0	0	0	0	0
March 2021	East Godavari	Mummidivaram	20	14	6	0	0	0	0	0	0
March 2021	West Godavari	Narasapuram	31	24	1	4	0	0	0	0	2
March 2021	West Godavari	Nidadavolu	28	27	1	0	0	0	0	0	0
March 2021	West Godavari	Kovvur	23	15	7	0	1	0	0	0	0
March 2021	West Godavari	Jangareddygudem	29	25	3	1	0	0	0	0	0
March 2021	Krishna	Nuzvid	32	25	7	0	0	0	0	0	0
March 2021	Krishna	Pedana	23	21	1	1	0	0	0	0	0
March 2021	Krishna	Vuyyuru	20	16	4	0	0	0	0	0	0
March 2021	Krishna	Nandigama	20	13	6	1	0	0	0	0	0
March 2021	Krishna	Tiruvuru	20	17	3	0	0	0	0	0	0
March 2021	Guntur	Tenali	40	32	8	0	0	0	0	0	0
March 2021	Guntur	Chilakaluripet	38	30	8	0	0	0	0	0	0
March 2021	Guntur	Repalle	28	25	2	0	0	0	0	0	1
March 2021	Guntur	Macherla	31	31	0	0	0	0	0	0	0
March 2021	Guntur	Sattenapalle	31	24	4	1	0	0	0	0	2
March 2021	Guntur	Vinukonda	32	28	4	0	0	0	0	0	0
March 2021	Guntur	Piduguralla	33	33	0	0	0	0	0	0	0
March 2021	Prakasam	Chirala	33	19	1	0	0	0	0	0	13
March 2021	Prakasam	Markapur	35	30	5	0	0	0	0	0	0
March 2021	Prakasam	Addanki	19	12	7	0	0	0	0	0	0
March 2021	Prakasam	Chimakurthy	20	18	2	0	0	0	0	0	0
March 2021	Prakasam	Kanigiri	20	20	0	0	0	0	0	0	0
March 2021	Prakasam	Giddaluru	20	16	3	0	0	0	0	0	1
March 2021	Nellore	Venkatagiri	25	25	0	0	0	0	0	0	0
March 2021	Nellore	Atmakur	23	19	2	0	0	0	0	0	2
March 2021	Nellore	Sullurpeta	25	24	1	0	0	0	0	0	0
March 2021	Nellore	Naidupeta	25	23	1	0	1	0	0	0	0
March 2021	Ananthapur	Hindupur	38	29	6	0	1	0	0	0	2
March 2021	Ananthapur	Guntakal	37	28	7	0	0	0	1	0	1
March 2021	Ananthapur	Tadipatri	36	16	18	0	0	0	1	0	1
March 2021	Ananthapur	Dharmavaram	40	40	0	0	0	0	0	0	0
March 2021	Ananthapur	Kadiri	36	30	5	0	0	0	0	0	1
March 2021	Ananthapur	Rayadurg	32	30	2	0	0	0	0	0	0
March 2021	Ananthapur	Gooty	25	24	1	0	0	0	0	0	0
March 2021	Ananthapur	Kalyandurg	24	19	4	0	0	0	0	0	1
March 2021	Ananthapur	Puttaparthi	20	14	6	0	0	0	0	0	0
March 2021	Ananthapur	Madakasira	20	15	5	0	0	0	0	0	0
March 2021	Kurnool	Adoni	42	40	1	0	0	0	0	0	1
March 2021	Kurnool	Nandyal	42	37	4	0	0	0	0	0	1
March 2021	Kurnool	Yemmiganur	34	31	3	0	0	0	0	0	0
March 2021	Kurnool	Dhone	32	31	0	0	0	0	1	0	0
March 2021	Kurnool	Nandikotkur	29	21	1	0	0	0	0	0	7
March 2021	Kurnool	Gudur	20	12	3	0	1	0	0	0	4
March 2021	Kurnool	Allagadda	27	22	2	0	2	0	0	0	1
March 2021	Kurnool	Atmakur	24	20	1	0	0	0	0	0	3
March 2021	Kadapa	Proddatur	41	39	1	0	0	0	0	0	1
March 2021	Kadapa	Pulivendula	33	33	0	0	0	0	0	0	0
March 2021	Kadapa	Jammalamadugu	20	18	0	0	2	0	0	0	0
March 2021	Kadapa	Badvel	35	28	3	0	0	0	0	0	4
March 2021	Kadapa	Rayachoti	34	34	0	0	0	0	0	0	0
March 2021	Kadapa	Mydukur	24	11	12	1	0	0	0	0	0
March 2021	Kadapa	Yerraguntla	20	20	0	0	0	0	0	0	0
March 2021	Chittoor	Madanapalle	35	33	2	0	0	0	0	0	0
March 2021	Chittoor	Punganur	31	31	0	0	0	0	0	0	0
March 2021	Chittoor	Palamaner	26	24	2	0	0	0	0	0	0
March 2021	Chittoor	Nagari	29	24	4	0	0	0	0	0	1
March 2021	Chittoor	Puttur	27	22	5	0	0	0	0	0	0
September 2021	West Godavari	Akiveedu	20	12	4	3	0	0	0	0	1
September 2021	Krishna	Jaggaiahpet	31	17	14	0	0	0	0	0	0
September 2021	Krishna	Kondapalli	29	14	14	0	0	0	0	0	1
September 2021	Guntur	Dachepalle	20	11	7	1	0	0	0	0	1
September 2021	Guntur	Gurazala	20	16	3	1	0	0	0	0	0
September 2021	Prakasam	Darsi	20	7	13	0	0	0	0	0	0
September 2021	Nellore	Buchireddypalem	20	18	2	0	0	0	0	0	0
September 2021	Ananthapur	Penukonda	20	18	2	0	0	0	0	0	0
September 2021	Kurnool	Bethamcherla	20	14	6	0	0	0	0	0	0
September 2021	Kadapa	Kamalapuram	20	15	5	0	0	0	0	0	0
September 2021	Kadapa	Rajampet	29	24	4	0	0	0	0	0	1
September 2021	Chittoor	Kuppam	25	19	6	0	0	0	0	0	0
Total			2,396	1,935	351	23	8	0	3	1	75

== See also ==
- Elections in Andhra Pradesh
- 2021 elections in India
- List of urban local bodies in Andhra Pradesh
