= B. Prasada Rao =

Indian police officer (1955–2021)

Policeman B. Prasada Rao, IPS
- Born: Bayyarapu Prasada Rao; 11 September 1955 (age 71); Vijayawada
- Died: 10 May 2021 (aged 65); United States of America
- Resting place: Christian Cemetery, Narayanguda
- Education: B.Sc (Andhra) (1975); M.Sc (IIT) (1977); Ph.D (Sri Krishnadevaraya) (2014)
- Alma mater: Andhra Loyola College, Vijayawada, Indian Institute of Technology, Madras, Sri Krishnadevaraya University, Anantapur
- Known for: Research in Physics
- Notable work: Studies on the Wave Particle Duality of Light
- Police career
- Indian Police Service: 1979 batch; 32 Regular Recruit
- Department: Andhra Pradesh Police
- Service years: 1979-2014 (35 years)
- Status: Retired
- Rank: Director General of Police

Bayyarapu Prasada Rao (Telugu: బయ్యారపు ప్రసాద రావు; 11 September 1955 – 10 May 2021) was an Indian Police Service (IPS) officer from the 1979 batch of the state of Andhra Pradesh who served as the Director General (DGP) of Andhra Pradesh Police. He was appointed in charge Director General of Police (DGP) of Andhra Pradesh on 30 September 2013. Earlier he served as the Director General of the Anti-Corruption Bureau (ACB). After the bifurcation of Andhra Pradesh, he was deputed as Secretary (Internal Security) in the Ministry of Home Affairs (MHA), Government of India which is one of the key posts after the Union Home Secretary. After his retirement he served as Professor in Physics and Director (Training, Placements and Industry Interface) at Bharat Institutions, Hyderabad.

== Early life and education ==
Dr. Bayyarapu Prasada Rao did his Elementary Education from Municipal Elementary School, Narsaraopet, Guntur District; High School at Zilla Parishath High School, Kollur, Guntur District; Intermediate—Loyola College, Vijayawada, Krishna District, B.Sc. (Physics) from Andhra Loyola College, Vijayawada, Krishna district.

Prasada Rao hailed from Guntur district of coastal Andhra. Earlier, he served as Commissioner of Police, Hyderabad City and Visakhapatnam and as superintendent of police of Nizamabad, Karimnagar and Nalgonda districts. He also served as vice-chairman and managing director of AP State Road Transport Corporation. He did his M.Sc. (Physics) from IIT (Madras) in 1977, continued to evince keen interest in physics. He still researched in his lab at home. He also authored a book 'Word power to mind power', a unique method of learning and memorizing English vocabulary applying visualization and contextualization.

== Career ==
Rao took over as in-charge head of the AP state's police forces on October 1, 2013. He succeeded V Dinesh Reddy. A post-graduate in physics from IIT Madras, Prasada Rao joined the police service in 1979 and was allotted the AP cadre. He has been SP of Nizamabad, Karimnagar and Nalgonda districts and served as SP Vigilance cell, SP Intelligence and commandant of the Central Industrial Security Force at Visakhapatnam and Bhopal. He was the DIG of Eluru and Kurnool ranges and also additional director of the Anti Corruption Bureau and DIG of the Security Wing of Intelligence. Rao served as the Commissioner of Police of Hyderabad and Cyberabad. He served as vice-chairman and MD of APSRTC and Additional DG (Law and Order) and Additional DG (Provisioning & Logistics). He won the Indian Police Medal for meritorious service in 1997 and the President's Police Medal for distinguished service in 2006

Police appointments
Preceded by V. Dinesh Reddy, IPS	Director General of Police, Andhra Pradesh Police; 30 October 2013 to 2 June 2014	Succeeded by J. V. Ramudu, IPS
