= Tirupati Police Commissionerate =

Law enforcement agency

Agency overview
- Formed: 5 October 2026; 40 days ago

Jurisdictional structure
- Operations jurisdiction: Tirupati, Andhra Pradesh, India

Operational structure
- Elected Minister responsible: Vangalapudi Anitha, Minister of Home Affairs, Government of Andhra Pradesh
- Parent agency: Andhra Pradesh Police

Tirupati Police Commissionerate is the local law enforcement agency for the city of Tirupati, Andhra Pradesh and is headed by the Commissioner of Police. The city police commissionerate was established in 2026.

== Overview ==
- 23 September 2026: The Government of Andhra Pradesh approved the establishment of Tirupati Police Commissionerate.
- 5 October 2026: the Tirupati Police Commissionerate was established.

=== Hierarchy ===
- Commissioner of Police (CP) (IGP Rank)
  (DIGP Rank)
- Additional Commissioner of Police (Addl.CP) (IGP Rank)
  (DIGP Rank)
- Joint Commissioner of Police (Jt.CP) (IGP Rank)
  (DIGP Rank)
- Deputy Commissioner of Police (DCP) (SP Rank)
  (SSP Rank)
- Additional Deputy Commissioner of Police (SP Rank)
  (Addl.SP Rank)
- Assistant Commissioner of Police (ACP)
  (ASP/DSP Rank)
- Inspector of Police/Circle Inspector (CI)
- Sub-Inspector of Police (SI)
- Assistant Sub Inspector of Police (ASI)
- Head Constable (HC)
- Police Constable (PC)

== Current structure of Police Stations ==
The Tirupati Police Commissionerate is headed by a commissioner of police and one joint commissioner of police there are 4 zones and 7 Sub-Divisions and each division consists of a Deputy commissioner of Police and Assistant Commissioner of Police with particular number of police stations.

=== Law and order ===
==== Tirumala zone ====
1) Tirumala sub-division: Tirumala 1 Town Police Station, Tirumala 2 Town Police Station

==== Tirupati zone ====
1) Tirupati sub-division: SVU Police Station, Alipiri Police Station, Tirupati East Police Station

2) Chandragiri sub-division: Tirupati rural Police Station, Tiruchanur Police Station, Pakala Police Station, R C Puram Police Station, Erravaripalem Police Station, Bhakarapeta Police Station

==== Sri Kalahasti zone ====
1) Sri Kalahasti sub-division: Sri Kalahasti 1 Town Police Station, Sri Kalahasti 2 Town Police Station, Sri Kalahasti rural Police Station, B N Kandriga Police Station, Thottembedu Police Station

2) Renigunta sub-division: Renigunta Police Station, Gajulamandyam Police Station, Tirupati Airport Police Station, Erpedu Police Station, Railway-Koduru Police Station, Obulavaripalle Police Station, Chitvelu Police Station, Pullampeta Police Station, Penagaluru Police Station

==== Sri City zone ====
1) Naidupeta sub-division: Naidupeta Police Station, Doravarisatram Police Station, Pellakuru Police Station, Oojili Police Station, Sullurupeta Police Station, Sriharikota Police Station, Tada Police Station, Vakadu Police Station, Chittamuru Police Station, Venkatagiri Police Station, Balayapalli Police Station, Dakkili Police Station

2) Putturu sub-division: Puttur Police Station, Vadamalapeta Police Station, Narayanavanam Police Station, Picchaturu Police Station, K V B Puram Police Station, Satyavedu Police Station, Paradayapalem Police Station, Nagalapuram Police Station

=== Traffic ===
1) Tirumala sub-division: Tirumala Traffic Police Station

== Insignia ==
Current officeholder	Post/Designation	Abbreviation	Equivalent Rank in State Police	Insignia	Description
Vacant	Commissioner of Police	CP	IGP/DIG		Overall head of Tirupati Police Commissionerate
Vacant	Additional Commissioner of Police	Addl.CP	IGP/DIG		Heads specific departments like Law & Order, Traffic, or Crime
Vacant	Joint Commissioner of Police	Jt.CP	IGP/DIG		Supervises zones or large divisions
Vacant	Deputy Commissioner of Police (Selection Grade)	DCP (SG)	SP (SG)		Senior DCP rank, manages major police zones
Vacant	Deputy Commissioner of Police	DCP	SP		Leads a police division or district within the city
Vacant	Additional Deputy Commissioner of Police	Addl.DCP	Addl.SP		Assists DCP in administration and operations
Vacant	Assistant Commissioner of Police	ACP	ASP / DSP		Heads a sub-division or circle; first gazetted officer rank

Current officeholder	Post/Designation	Abbreviation	Insignia	Description
Vacant	Inspector of Police	Inspector		Officer-in-charge of a police station; supervises investigations and overall station functioning
Vacant	Sub Inspector of Police	SI		Primary investigating officer; leads field operations and supports the Inspector
Vacant	Assistant Sub Inspector	ASI		Assists the SI in investigations and station duties
Vacant	Head constable	HC		Supervises constables; responsible for beat management and report preparation
Vacant	Constable	PC	No insignia	Entry-level rank in the police; responsible for patrolling, enforcing law and order, and assisting senior officers

== Police Commissioners ==
Tirupati City Police Commissioners
Sl. No.	Name of Police Chief	Batch	Tenure	Domicile
1	Vacant	-	-	-

== See also ==
- NTR Police Commissionerate
- Guntur Police Commissionerate
- Rajamahendravaram Police Commissionerate
- Kurnool Police Commissionerate
