= Nidigattu Sanjay =

Indian police officer

Policeperson Nidigattu Sanjay IPS
- Born: 19 March 1967 (age 59); Visakhapatnam, Andhra Pradesh
- Education: L.M.E. (SBTET), AMIE, LL.B. (Andhra)
- Known for: Team building
- Police career
- Indian Police Service
- Branch: Andhra Pradesh Police
- Service years: 7 September 1997-present
- Status: Placed under suspension
- Rank: Additional Director General of Police
- Badge no.: 19961080 (Regular recruit of 50th batch)
- Awards: Antrik Suraksha Seva Padak (2004)

Nidigattu Sanjay (born 19 March 1967), better known as N. Sanjay, is a Silver jubilee 1996-batch Regular Recruit (RR) Indian Police Service Officer belonging to Andhra Pradesh Police cadre. He has been waiting for posting since 8 June 2024 by Chandrababu Naidu led government that came to power after 2024 Andhra Pradesh Legislative Assembly election. Since 4 December 2024, he is placed under suspension for allegedly manipulating the processes and misappropriation of funds while awarding contract work for the development and maintenance of AGNI – NOC (Automated Governance & NOC Integration) web portal, mobile app and others.

Earlier, Sanjay was the Chief of AP Criminal Investigation Department. He was also holding full additional charges as Director-General of AP Disaster Response and Fire Services and as Director, AP Police Personnel and Training. Since 2017, he has been Director of Andhra Pradesh Police Academy in Anantapur, until it was moved to Mangalagiri. On 27 January 2021, he was promoted to the rank of Additional Director General of Police.

Earlier in 2021, the Policeman was assigned a very sensitive role of Special Officer to monitor 2021 Andhra Pradesh local elections. He was appointed by State Election Commissioner, N. Ramesh Kumar, IAS. His brief included not only overseeing security arrangements for elections, and also apprising State Election Commission on efforts to contain malpractices. The election exercise, which was held over four phases in February 2021, with a mechanism to receive and redress complaints. Along with Ramesh Kumar, Sanjay toured the state, initiating confidence-building measures among voters.

== Education ==
Sanjay was born into a family that was serving in Indian Armed Forces. After schooling at St. Aloysius' Anglo-Indian High School and collegiate studies in Visakhapatnam and New Delhi, he took a diploma in mechanical engineering, Sanjay joined Visakhapatnam Steel Plant, where he worked for nearly 8 years. He also pursued a course in law from Andhra University, Waltair. With his father's inspiration, he prepared for civil services.

In the late nineties, Sanjay got selected to Indian Police Service and was trained in Lal Bahadur Shastri National Academy of Administration, Mussorie and Sardar Vallabhbhai Patel National Police Academy, Shivarampally. He was a Regular Recruit of 50th group of recruits at Police Academy, when it was under incumbency of Trinath Mishra, IPS.

== Career ==
=== Pre-bifurcation ===
Sanjay served in different capacities in undivided Andhra Pradesh in districts of Warangal, Nalgonda, Kurnool, Ananthapur, Nizamabad and Hyderabad. In tackling crime, he faced Naxalism, Communalism and Factionalism and braved odds to rein in discipline.

In Hyderabad City, he served as Deputy Commissioner of Police (West Zone) during 2004 and was also Joint Commissioner of Police (Administration) in 2013. During Sanjay's tenure as DCP in Hyderabad in 2004, his jurisdiction (West Zone) witnessed a sensational case of crime that involved Tollywood film star Balakrishna. There was also a shootout of a Leopard, that irked Animal rights Activists, which he reminiscences that it was rather necessitated due to force of circumstances. Sanjay also served in Organisation for Counter Terrorist Operations (OCTOPUS) in 2010.

=== Post-bifurcation ===
In 2014, during bifurcation of Andhra Pradesh, the Police Officer chose to remain in residual Andhra Pradesh. On his preference, he was retained in Andhra Pradesh cadre. Even after bifurcation, he continued to serve in Telangana as Joint Managing Director of Andhra Pradesh Power Generation Corporation Limited until he was moved to Andhra Pradesh in early 2015 to serve as South Coastal Zone Guntur Range Inspector-general of police. During his two-year tenure as IGP, Sanjay continued to let the presence of Police known, to serve as a deterrent to those breaking the law.

In 2017, he was transferred as Director, Andhra Pradesh Police Academy, where he has been involved in overseeing training component of Policemen of State Police Services. During his first year in Ananthapur, there were 652 Stipendiary Cadet Trainee Sub-inspectors of Police of 2017 batch, out of which 165 were women, a record 25% of total candidates passing out of the college. In 2018, when Andhra Pradesh Police released a training manual on investigation in Human trafficking by then Director-General of police, R. P. Thakur in the presence of Social activist and Padma Shri awardee, Sunitha Krishnan, Sanjay was present and reaffirmed the commitment of Police force to include the manual in Syllabi of Police Training Colleges across the State. With a spike in Cyber crimes and to better equip Police force, the Policeman conducted short-term courses among its Policemen on aspects to deal with it.

Under an E-governance project of National Crime Records Bureau under Government of India, Sanjay was made a Nodal Officer in 2019 for Andhra Pradesh to oversee Crime and Criminal Tracking Network and Systems.

Police appointments
Preceded by P. V. Sunil Kumar, IPS	Director, AP Crime Investigation Department, Guntur, Andhra Pradesh; 2023–2024	Succeeded by Dr. A. Ravi Shankar, IPS
Preceded by Madireddy Pratap, IPS	Director-General, Andhra Pradesh State Disaster Response and Fire Services Department, Vijayawada, Andhra Pradesh; 2022-2023	Succeeded by P. V. Sunil Kumar, IPS
Preceded by P. V. Sunil Kumar, IPS	Managing Director, Andhra Pradesh Police Housing Corporation, Mangalagiri, Andhra Pradesh; 2021-2022	Succeeded by P. Venkata Rami Reddy, IPS
Preceded by T. Ravi Kumar Murthy, IPS	Inspector-general of police, Training, Mangalagiri, Andhra Pradesh; 2017-2021	Succeeded by P. Venkata Rami Reddy, IPS
Preceded by P. V. Sunil Kumar, IPS	Inspector-general of police, South Coastal Zone, Guntur, Andhra Pradesh; 2015–2017	Succeeded by Vineet Brijlal, IPS
Preceded by N. Suryanarayana, IPS	Chief Vigilance Security Officer, Andhra Pradesh Power Generation Corporation Limited, Hyderabad, Telangana; 2014-2015	Succeeded by G. Vijayanand, IPS
Preceded by Mahesh Muralidhar Bhagwat, IPS	Joint Commissioner of Police, Hyderabad City Police; 2013-2014	Succeeded by T. Murali Krishna, IPS
Preceded by N. Suryanarayana, IPS	Deputy Inspector General of Police, Nizamabad Range, Andhra Pradesh; 2011-2013	Succeeded by Rajiv Ratan, IPS (FAC)
Preceded by Position created	Deputy Inspector General of Police, OCTOPUS, Hyderabad, Andhra Pradesh; 2010-2011	Succeeded by V. Murali Krishna, IPS
Preceded by Illyas Seth, IPS	Principal, Police Training College, Ananthapur, Andhra Pradesh; 2005-2010	Succeeded by P. Venkata Rami Reddy, IPS
Preceded by Anjana Sinha, IPS	Deputy Commissioner of Police, West Zone, Hyderabad City Police; 2003-2005	Succeeded by C. Ravi Varma, IPS
Preceded by P. S. R. Anjaneyulu, IPS	Superintendent of Police - in - Kurnool District, Andhra Pradesh; 2002-2003	Succeeded by V. R. K. Mohan Rao, IPS
Preceded by T. Prabhakar Rao, IPS	Officer on Special Duty; Additional Superintendent of Police, Nalgonda, Andhra Pradesh; 2001-2002	Succeeded by V. C. Sajjanar, IPS (FAC)
Preceded by R. S. Praveen Kumar, IPS	Assistant Superintendent of Police, Bellampalli, Andhra Pradesh; 2000-2001	Succeeded by Mahesh Muralidhar Bhagwat, IPS (FAC)
Preceded by -	Assault Commander, Greyhounds, Hyderabad, Andhra Pradesh; 1999-2000	Succeeded by -
