= Rajamahendravaram Police Commissionerate =

Law enforcement agency

Agency overview
- Formed: 5 October 2026; 40 days ago

Jurisdictional structure
- Operations jurisdiction: Rajamahendravaram, Andhra Pradesh, India

Operational structure
- Elected Minister responsible: Vangalapudi Anitha, Minister of Home Affairs, Government of Andhra Pradesh
- Parent agency: Andhra Pradesh Police

Rajamahendravaram Police Commissionerate is the local law enforcement agency for the city of Rajamahendravaram, Andhra Pradesh and is headed by the Commissioner of Police. The Police Commissionerate was established in 2026.

== History ==
- 23 September 2026: The Government of Andhra Pradesh approved the establishment of Rajamahendravaram Police Commissionerate.
- 5 October 2026: the Rajamahendravaram Police Commissionerate was established.

=== Hierarchy ===
- Commissioner of Police (CP) (IGP Rank)
  (DIGP Rank)
- Additional Commissioner of Police (Addl.CP) (IGP Rank)
  (DIGP Rank)
- Joint Commissioner of Police (Jt.CP) (IGP Rank)
  (DIGP Rank)
- Deputy Commissioner of Police (DCP) (SP Rank)
  (SSP Rank)
- Additional Deputy Commissioner of Police (SP Rank)
  (Addl.SP Rank)
- Assistant Commissioner of Police (ACP)
  (ASP/DSP Rank)
- Inspector of Police/Circle Inspector (CI)
- Sub-Inspector of Police (SI)
- Assistant Sub Inspector of Police (ASI)
- Head Constable (HC)
- Police Constable (PC)

== Current structure of Law and order Police Stations ==
The Rajamahendravaram Police Commissionerate is headed by a commissioner of police and one joint commissioner of police there are 3 zones and 5 Sub-Divisions and each division consists of a Deputy commissioner of Police and Assistant Commissioner of Police with particular number of police stations.

=== Rajamahendravaram zone ===
1) Central sub-division: One Town Police Station, Two Town Police Station, Three Town Police Station, Prakash Nagar Police Station

2) South sub-division: Bommuru Police Station, Dowleswaram Police Station, Kadiyam Police Station

=== East Godavari zone ===
1) North sub-division: Korukonda Police Station, Gokavaram Police Station, Seethanagaram Police Station, Airport Police Station, Rajanagaram Police Station

2) East sub-division: Anaparthi Police Station, Biccavolu Police Station, Rangampeta Police Station, Mandapeta Police Station, Mandapeta Rural Police Station, Angara Police Station, Rayavaram Police Station

=== Kovvur zone ===
1) Kovvur sub-division: Kovvur Police Station, Kovvur Rural Police Station, Chagallu Police Station, Tallapudi Police Station, Devarapalli Police Station, Gopalapuram Police Station, Nallajerla Police Station, Nidadavole Police Station, Samisragudem Police Station, Peravali Police Station, Undrajavaram Police Station

== Insignia ==
Current officeholder	Post/Designation	Abbreviation	Equivalent Rank in State Police	Insignia	Description
Vacant	Commissioner of Police	CP	IGP/DIG		Overall head of Rajamahendravaram Police Commissionerate
Vacant	Additional Commissioner of Police	Addl.CP	IGP/DIG		Heads specific departments like Law & Order, Traffic, or Crime
Vacant	Joint Commissioner of Police	Jt.CP	IGP/DIG		Supervises zones or large divisions
Vacant	Deputy Commissioner of Police (Selection Grade)	DCP (SG)	SP (SG)		Senior DCP rank, manages major police zones
Vacant	Deputy Commissioner of Police	DCP	SP		Leads a police division or district within the city
Vacant	Additional Deputy Commissioner of Police	Addl.DCP	Addl.SP		Assists DCP in administration and operations
Vacant	Assistant Commissioner of Police	ACP	ASP / DSP		Heads a sub-division or circle; first gazetted officer rank

Current officeholder	Post/Designation	Abbreviation	Insignia	Description
Vacant	Inspector of Police	Inspector		Officer-in-charge of a police station; supervises investigations and overall station functioning
Vacant	Sub Inspector of Police	SI		Primary investigating officer; leads field operations and supports the Inspector
Vacant	Assistant Sub Inspector	ASI		Assists the SI in investigations and station duties
Vacant	Head constable	HC		Supervises constables; responsible for beat management and report preparation
Vacant	Constable	PC	No insignia	Entry-level rank in the police; responsible for patrolling, enforcing law and order, and assisting senior officers

== Police Commissioners ==
Rajamahendravaram City Police Commissioners
Sl. No.	Name of Police Chief	Batch	Tenure	Domicile
1	Vacant	-	-	-

== See also ==
- NTR Police Commissionerate
- Tirupati Police Commissionerate
- Guntur Police Commissionerate
- Kurnool Police Commissionerate
