= A. K. Khan =

A. K. Khan may refer to:

- Abul Kashem Khan (1905–1991), Bangladeshi lawyer, industrialist and politician
  - A K Khan & Company
- A. K. Khan (police officer) (born 1956), IPS officer
