= Raja Bahadur Venkatarama Reddy Education Society Boys Hostel =

Raja Bahadur Venkatarama Reddy Education Society Boys Hostel popularly known as Reddy Hostel is an independent boys hostel located in Hyderabad, Telangana. It was established in 1918 by philanthropist, Raja Bahadur Venkatarama Reddy. It was the first hostel established in Hyderabad State for non-local students.

== History ==
The hostel was started in the year 1918 during the reign of last Nizam of Hyderabad State, Mir Osman Ali Khan by Raja Bahadur Venakta Rama Reddy, a civil servant and philanthropist. Reddy Hostel library has a collection of old and new books.

== Notable alumni ==
- P V Narasimha Rao - former prime minister of India
- Raavi Narayan Reddy - revolutionary activist
- Sujith Reddy
