= Nimmagadda =

Nimmagadda (Telugu: నిమ్మగడ్డ) is Telugu surname. Notable people with the surname include:

- Nimmagadda Prasad (born 1961), Indian industrialist
- Nimmagadda Ramesh Kumar (born 1956), Indian politician
