= Human trafficking in India =

Human trafficking in India, although illegal under Indian law, remained a significant problem. People were frequently illegally trafficked through India for commercial sexual exploitation and forced/bonded labour. Although no reliable study of forced and bonded labour was completed, NGOs estimated this problem affected 20 to 65 million Indians. Men, women and children were trafficked in India for diverse reasons. Women and girls were trafficked within the country for the purposes of commercial sexual exploitation and forced marriage, especially in those areas where the sex ratio is highly skewed in favour of men. Men and boys were trafficked for the purposes of labour, and may be sexually exploited by traffickers to serve as gigolos, massage experts, escorts, etc. A significant portion of children are subjected to forced labour as factory workers, domestic servants, beggars, and agriculture workers, and have been used as armed combatants by some terrorist and insurgent groups.

India was also a destination for women and girls from Nepal and Bangladesh trafficked for the purpose of commercial sexual exploitation. Nepali children were also trafficked to India for forced labour in circus shows. Indian women were trafficked to the Middle East for commercial sexual exploitation. Indian migrants who migrated willingly every year to the Middle East and Europe for work as domestic servants and low-skilled labourers may also have ended up part of the human trafficking industry. In such cases, workers may have been 'recruited' by way of fraudulent recruitment practices that led them directly into situations of forced labour, including debt bondage; in other cases, high debts incurred to pay recruitment fees left them vulnerable to exploitation by unscrupulous employers in the destination countries, where some were subjected to conditions of involuntary servitude, including non-payment of wages, restrictions on movement, unlawful withholding of passports, and physical or sexual abuse.

Human trafficking in India results in women suffering from both mental and physical issues. Mental issues include disorders such as PTSD, depression and anxiety. The lack of control women have in trafficking increases their risk of suffering from mental disorders. Women who are forced into trafficking are at a higher risk for HIV, TB, and other STDs. Condoms are rarely used and therefore there is a higher risk for victims to suffer from an STD.

India ratified the 2000 UN TIP Protocol in 2011.

The U.S. State Department's Office to Monitor and Combat Trafficking in Persons placed the country in "Tier 2" in 2017 and 2023.

In 2023, the Organised Crime Index gave the country a score of 8 out of 10 for human trafficking, noting porous borders with Nepal and Bangladesh.

== Profile and demographics of traffickers in 2011 ==
Traffickers of young girls into prostitution in India are often women who have been trafficked themselves. As adults they use personal relationships and trust in their villages of origin to recruit additional girls.

== Prosecution in 2010 ==
The Government of India penalises trafficking for commercial sexual exploitation through the Immoral Trafficking Prevention Act (ITPA), with prescribed penalty of seven years' to life imprisonment. India also prohibits bonded and forced labour through the Bonded Labour Abolition Act, the Child Labour Act, and the Juvenile Justice Act.

Indian authorities also use Sections 366(A) and 372 of the Indian Penal Code, prohibiting kidnapping and selling minors into prostitution respectively, to arrest traffickers. Penalties under these provisions are a maximum of ten years' imprisonment and a fine.

Bonded labour and the movement of sex trafficking victims may occasionally be facilitated by corrupt officials.They protect brothels that exploit victims and protect traffickers and brothel keepers from arrest and other threats of enforcement.

Usually, there are no efforts made to tackle the problem of government officials' complicity in trafficking workers for overseas employment. The bulk of bonded labour heads for Middle East to emerging economies and there are several media reports which report on the illegal and inhumane trafficking of Indian workers.

India's Central Bureau of Investigation incorporated anti-trafficking training, by Dr. Gilly McKenzie of the Interpol Trafficking and Organised Crime Division, into its standard curriculum. In November 2008, the State of Maharashtra developed an action plan to combat trafficking; it did not, however, allocate appropriate funding to accomplish the objectives of this plan.

The government does not break down these statistics by sections of the law, meaning that law enforcement data regarding trafficking offenses may be conflated with data regarding arrests of women in prostitution pursuant to Section 8 of the ITPA.

== Protection in 2010 ==
India's efforts to protect victims of trafficking vary from state to state, but remain inadequate in many places. Victims of bonded labour are entitled to ₹ 10,000 (US $185) from the central government for rehabilitation, but this programme is unevenly executed across the country. Government authorities do not proactively identify and rescue bonded labourers, so few victims receive this assistance. Although children trafficked for forced labour may be housed in government shelters and are entitled to₹ 20,000 ($370), the quality of many of these homes remains poor and the disbursement of rehabilitation funds is sporadic.

Some states provide services to victims of bonded labour, but non-governmental organisations provide the majority of protection services to these victims. The central government does not provide protection services to Indian victims trafficked abroad for forced labour or commercial sexual exploitation. Indian diplomatic missions in destination countries may offer temporary shelter to nationals who have been trafficked; once repatriated, however, neither the central government nor most state governments offer any medical, psychological, legal, or reintegration assistance for these victims.

Section 8 of the ITPA permits the arrest of women in prostitution. Although statistics on arrests under Section 8 are not kept, the government and some NGOs report that, through sensitization and training, police officers no longer use this provision of the law; it is unclear whether arrests of women in prostitution under Section 8 have actually decreased. Because most law enforcement authorities lack formal procedures to identify trafficking victims among women arrested for prostitution; some victims may be arrested and punished for acts committed as a result of being trafficked.

Some foreign victims trafficked to India are not subject to removal. Those who are subject to removal are not offered legal alternatives to removal to countries in which they may face hardship or retribution. NGOs report that some Bengali victims of commercial sexual exploitation are pushed back across the border without protection services. The government also does not repatriate Nepali victims; NGOs primarily perform this function. Many victims decline to testify against their traffickers due to the length of proceedings and fear of retribution by traffickers.

The Ministry of Labour and Employment displays full-page advertisements against child labour in national newspapers at periodic intervals. The government has also instituted pre-departure information sessions for domestic workers migrating abroad on the risks of exploitation. These measures include distinguishing between 'Emigration Check Required' (ECR) and 'Emigration Check Not Required' (ECNR) passports. ECR passport holders must prove to government authorities that they shall not be exploited when travelling abroad, if they wish to travel. Many Indian workers pay large sums of money to agents who facilitate their emigration outside the official channels and willingly emigrate despite the risks, drawn by the hope of higher salaries abroad. Therefore, a dream of better future often lures the people abroad and hence trafficking cannot entirely be prevented.

== Protection after 2010 ==
The Government of India launched an anti human trafficking web portal in February 2014 that they hope will be an effective way for interested parties to share information about this topic.

In 2017, Mahesh Bhagwat, an Indian Police Service (IPS) officer, was honored with the U.S. Department of State's Trafficking in Persons (TIP) Report Heroes Award for his significant contributions to combating human trafficking in India. As the Commissioner of Police for Rachakonda, Telangana, Bhagwat led numerous anti-trafficking operations, resulting in the rescue of hundreds of victims from forced labor and sexual exploitation. His innovative use of legal provisions to close sites associated with human trafficking and his dedication to making anti-trafficking a priority in Telangana have been widely recognized.

The Salvation Army has a program that provides safe places for children of women who work in the red district in India.

== See also ==
- Debt bondage in India
- Rape in India
- Human rights in India
- Child trafficking in India
- Human trafficking in Nepal
