= Vizianagaram Municipal Corporation =

City governing body in India

Vizianagaram Municipal Corporation Vizianagaraṁ nagara pālaka Sanstha విజయనగరం నగర పాలక సంస్థ

Type
- Type: Municipal Corporation of the Vizianagaram

History
- Founded: 2015

Leadership
- Mayor: Vacant (since 18 March 2026)
- Deputy Mayor: Vacant (since 18 March 2026)
- Corporation Commissioner: B. Balaswamy
- Seats: 50

Elections
- Voting system: First Past the Post
- Last election: 10 March 2021
- Next election: TBH

Website
- Vijayanagaram Municipal Corporation

Vizianagaram Municipal Corporation is the civic body that governs the city of Vizianagaram in the Indian state of Andhra Pradesh. The municipality was first constituted in the year 1888 and was upgraded to corporation on 9 December 2015. Municipal Corporation mechanism in India was introduced during British Rule with formation of municipal corporation in Madras (Chennai) in 1688, later followed by municipal corporations in Bombay (Mumbai) and Calcutta (Kolkata) by 1762. Vizianagaram Municipal Corporation is headed by Mayor of city and governed by Commissioner.

Though, it was upgraded to corporation, it continues to be a municipality till the expiry of its present elected council.

== Jurisdiction ==
Guntur Municipal Corporation

The corporation is spread over an area of 57.01 km^{2} (22.01 sq mi).

== List of Mayors ==
Vizianagaram Municipal Corporation (VMC)
Sno.	Mayor	DY Mayor	Term start	Term end	Party	Notes
1.	Vempadapu Vijayalakshmi	1) Muchu Laya Yadav 2) Sravani Kolagatla	2021	2026	YSR Congress Party	First Mayor of VMC

S.No.	Party name	Symbol	Won	Change
1	YSR Congress Party		48	Steady
2	Telugu Desam Party		1	Steady
3	Independents		1	Steady

== Functions ==
Vizianagaram Municipal Corporation is created for the following functions:

- Planning for the town including its surroundings which are covered under its Department's Urban Planning Authority .
- Approving construction of new buildings and authorising use of land for various purposes.
- Improvement of the town's economic and Social status.
- Arrangements of water supply towards commercial, residential and industrial purposes.
- Planning for fire contingencies through Fire Service Departments.
- Creation of solid waste management, public health system and sanitary services.
- Working for the development of ecological aspect like development of Urban Forestry and making guidelines for environmental protection.
- Working for the development of weaker sections of the society like mentally and physically handicapped, old age and gender biased people.
- Making efforts for improvement of slums and poverty removal in the town.

== Revenue sources ==
The following are the Income sources for the Corporation from the Central and State Government.

=== Revenue from taxes ===
Following is the Tax related revenue for the corporation.

- Property tax.
- Profession tax.
- Entertainment tax.
- Grants from Central and State Government like Goods and Services Tax.
- Advertisement tax.

=== Revenue from non-tax sources ===
Following is the Non Tax related revenue for the corporation.

- Water usage charges.
- Fees from Documentation services.
- Rent received from municipal property.
- Funds from municipal bonds.
