= Hyderabad City Police =

- Motto: Freedom from Fear Forever

Agency overview
- Formed: 28 March 1847; 179 years ago

Jurisdictional structure
- Operations jurisdiction: Hyderabad, Telangana, India
- Area: 650 sq. km
- Population: 9.7 million
- Legal jurisdiction: Hyderabad Metropolitan Region

Operational structure
- Headquarters: Telangana Integrated Command and Control Centre (TGICCC)
- Elected Minister responsible: Revanth Reddy, Minister of Home Affairs, Government of Telangana
- Agency executive: Mahesh Bhagwat, IPS, Commissioner of Police
- Parent agency: Telangana Police

Facilities
- Stations: 105 Ministry : Home Minister Telangana

Website
- hyderabadpolice.gov.in

Hyderabad City Police is the local law enforcement agency for the city of Hyderabad, Telangana and is headed by the Commissioner of Police. The city police traces its origins to 1847 under Hyderabad State.

== History ==
=== 1847–1948 ===
The Nizam of Hyderabad used to appoint the commissioners of police who were officers of the Hyderabad Civil Service and they used to function during his pleasure. They were answerable to the Nizam directly on various matters of policing in Hyderabad city. However, as far as administrative matters were concerned the commissioner of police used to correspond with the Home Department directly. The commissioner of police was popularly called "Kotwal" and was responsible for the maintenance of the law and order, prevention and detection of crime, etc.

=== Reorganization ===
Due to rapid increase in population, there has been a steady increase in crime. In view of the above in 1981 the city police was re-organised, vide G.O.Ms.No.341, Home Department, dated: 1981-05-30. The following structure was instituted:

- The disciplinary and administrative control of the force is held by the Commissioner of Police, having powers and functions of additional district magistrate.
- The city was divided into five zones: south, east, west, central and north, the four zones were again divided into 12 divisions. Each zone is in the charge of a deputy commissioner of police of the rank of a superintendent of police for maintenance of law and order, criminal investigation and keeping up the morale of the force.
- Each division is under the care of an assistant commissioner of police of the rank of deputy superintendent of police, who works under the control of deputy commissioner of police. He is responsible for prevention and detection of crimes, maintenance of law and order and discipline of the force.
- Each police station is under the care of an inspector of police who is the station house officer and performs all the duties and exercises all the powers of that office.
- The city crimes station was renamed as "Detective Department" which works under the deputy commissioner of police, assisted by assistant commissioners of police and inspectors.
- In 1992, the Government of Andhra Pradesh sanctioned three joint commissioners of police posts in the rank of deputy inspector general to assist the commissioner of police for effective functioning and better administration of city police each in-charge of co-ordination, crimes and security.
- One sub-inspector of police was to be placed in charge of law and order duties and another for crime duties for each police station. A divisional detective inspector for each division was provided for. In order to achieve this functional division it was proposed in the scheme to increases the number of posts of sub-inspectors and head constables and decrease the number of posts of police constables.plus in the corona time the police doing very good and in 2020 rainy season they were protecting still in heavy rain go police
- In 2014, Andhra Pradesh was split into two. Hyderabad became a part of Telangana.

=== Hierarchy ===
- Commissioner of Police (CP)
  (ADGP Rank)
- Additional Commissioner of Police (Addl.CP)
  (IG Rank)
- Joint Commissioner of Police (Jt.CP)
  (DIG Rank)
- Deputy Commissioner of Police (DCP)
  (SP Rank)
- Additional Deputy Commissioner of Police (Addl.DCP)
  (Addl.SP Rank)
- Assistant Commissioner of Police (ACP)
  (ASP/DSP Rank)
- Inspector of Police/Circle Inspector (CI)
- Sub-Inspector of Police (SI)
- Assistant Sub Inspector of Police (ASI)
- Head Constable (HC)
- Police Constable (PC)

== Current structure of Law and order Police Stations ==
Currently the Hyderabad City Police has five zones.

North Zone

1) Mahankali Division: PS Mahankali, PS Market, PS Ramgopal Pet 2) Gopalpuram Division: PS Gopalapuram, PS Maredpally 3) Begumpet Division: PS Begumpet, PS Bowenpally 4) Trimulgherry Division : PS Trimulgherry, Ps Bollaram, PS Karkhana

Central Zone 1) Abids Division : PS Abids, PS Begumbazar 2) Chikkadpally Division : PS Chikkadpally, PS Musheerabad, 3) Saifabad Division : PS Saifabad, PS Nampally, PS Khairthabad 4) Gandhi Nagar Division : PS Gandhi Nagar, PS Domal Guda, Ps Lake Police Station (Secretariat)

South Zone 1) Charminar Division: PS Charminar, PS Kamatipura, PS Hussaini Alam 2) Mirchowk Division: PS Mirchowk, PS Bhavani Nagar, PS Rein Bazar 3) Falaknuma Division: PS Falaknuma, PS Bahadurpura, PS Kala Phatar 4) Chatri Naka Division: PS Chatri Naka, PS Mogalpura, PS Shali banda

South East Zone 1) Chandrayangutta Division : PS Chandrayangutta, PS Bandla guda, PS Kanchan Bagh 2) Santosh Nagar Division : PS Santosh Nagar, PS IS Sadan 3) Saidabad Division : PS Saidabad, PS Madhannapet 4) Malakpet Division : Ps Malakpet, Ps Chaderghat, PS Dabeerpura

South West Zone 1) Asifnagar Division : PS Asifnagar, PS Habeeb Nagar, PS Humayun nagar 2) Goshamahal Division : PS Shah Inayat Gunj, PS Manglhat 3) Golconda Division : PS Golconda, PS Langer Houz 4) Kulsumpura Division : PS Kulsumpura, PS Guddi malkapur, PS Tappa Chabutra

West Zone 1) Banjara Hills Division: PS Banjara hills, PS Masab Tank 2) Jubilee Hills Division : PS Jubilee Hills, PS Film Nagar 3) Panjagutta Division: PS Panjagutta, PS Madhura Nagar 4) SR Nagar Division: PS SR Nagar, PS Borabanda

East Zone 1) Kachiguda Division: PS Kachiguda, PS Amberpet 2) Chilkalguda Division: PS Chilkalguda, PS Lala guda, PS Warsi guda 3) Osmania University Division : PS Osmania University, PS Nalla kunta

4) Sultan Bazar Division : PS Sultan Bazar, PS Afzal Gunj, PS Narayan Guda

== Women Police Stations ==
- WPS CCS
- WPS Begumpet
- WPS South zone

== Traffic Police Stations ==
1. Abid Traffic Police Station
2. Asif Nagar Traffic Police Station
3. Bahadurpura Traffic Police Station
4. Banjara Hills Traffic Police Station
5. Begumpet Traffic Police Station
6. Charminar Traffic Police Station
7. Chikkadpally Traffic Police Station
8. Falaknuma Traffic Police Station
9. Gopalpuram Traffic Police Station
10. Goshamahal Traffic Police Station
11. Jubilee Hills Traffic Police Station
12. Amberpet Traffic Police Station
13. Malakpet Traffic Police Station
14. Marredpally Traffic Police Station
15. Mahankali Traffic Police Station
16. Mirchowk Traffic Police Station
17. Nallakunta Traffic Police Station
18. Nampally Traffic Police Station
19. Narayanguda Traffic Police Station
20. Panjagutta Traffic Police Station
21. Saifabad Traffic Police Station
22. SR. Nagar Traffic Police Station
23. Sultan Bazar Traffic Police Station
24. Trimulgherry Traffic Police Station
25. Tolichowki Traffic Police Station

== Insignia of Hyderabad Police (City Police) ==
Post/Designation	Abbreviation	Equivalent Rank in State Police	Insignia	Description
Commissioner of Police	CP	DGP/ADGP		Overall head of Hyderabad City Police
Additional Commissioner of Police	Addl.CP	ADGP		Heads specific departments like Law & Order, Traffic, or Crime
Joint Commissioner of Police	Jt.CP	IGP/DIG		Supervises zones or large divisions
Deputy Commissioner of Police (Selection Grade)	DCP (SG)	SP (SG)		Senior DCP rank, manages major police zones
Deputy Commissioner of Police	DCP	SP		Leads a police division or district within the city
Additional Deputy Commissioner of Police	Addl.DCP	Addl.SP		Assists DCP in administration and operations
Assistant Commissioner of Police	ACP	ASP / DSP		Heads a sub-division or circle; first gazetted officer rank

Post/Designation	Abbreviation	Insignia	Description
Inspector of Police	Inspector		Officer-in-charge of a police station; supervises investigations and overall station functioning
Sub Inspector of Police	SI		Primary investigating officer; leads field operations and supports the Inspector
Assistant Sub Inspector	ASI		Assists the SI in investigations and station duties
Head constable	HC		Supervises constables; responsible for beat management and report preparation
Constable	PC	No insignia	Entry-level rank in the police; responsible for patrolling, enforcing law and order, and assisting senior officers

== Online presence ==
Hyderabad Police launched Facebook pages for the police stations in Hyderabad on 16 December 2014. The pages can be used by the general public to report grievances.

== Special agencies ==
- Intelligence Unit
- Commando Force
- Security Battalion

== See also ==
- Telangana Police
- Cyberabad Police
- Future City Police
- Malkajgiri police
