= Eluru Municipal Corporation =

Local civic body in Eluru, Andhra Pradesh, India

Type
- Type: Municipal Corporation of the Eluru

History
- Founded: 2005

Leadership
- Mayor: Shaik Noorjahan(TDP)
- Dep Mayor: P.Umamaheswararao(TDP) V.Durga Bhavai(TDP)
- Corporation Commissioner: Y.Sai Sreekanth

Structure
- Seats: 50
- Political groups: Government (47): YSRCP (47); Opposition (3): TDP (3)

Elections
- Last election: 10 March 2021

Website
- Eluru Municipal corporation

Eluru Municipal Corporation is the civic body that governs the city of Eluru in the Indian state of Andhra Pradesh.Municipal Corporation mechanism in India was introduced during British Rule with formation of municipal corporation in Madras (Chennai) in 1688, later followed by municipal corporations in Bombay (Mumbai) and Calcutta (Kolkata) by 1762. Eluru Municipal Corporation is headed by Mayor of city and governed by Commissioner.

== Jurisdiction ==
On 9 April 2005, Eluru Municipal Corporation was upgraded from selection grade municipality.on 9 April 2005. It is spread over an area of 14.50 km^{2} (5.60 sq mi) with 50 divisions and has a population of 283,648 as per the 2011 Census of India.

== List of mayors ==
Eluru Municipal Corporation (EMC)
Sno.	Mayor	DY Mayor	Term start	Term end	Party	Notes
1.	Kasi Viswanadhamma	Badeti Kotaramarao	2005	2010	Indian National Congress	First Mayor of EMC
2.	Sk.Noorjahan	C.H.Venkataratnam	2015	2020	Telugu Desam Party	First Women Mayor of EMC
3.	Sk.Noorjahan	G.Srinivasrao; N.Sudheerbabu	2021	2024	YSR Congress Party	
4.	Sk.Noorjahan	P.Umamaheswararao; V.Durga Bhavani	2024	2026	Telugu Desam Party	

=== 2021 ordinary elections ===
S.No.	Party name	Symbol	Won	Change
1	YSR Congress Party		47	Steady
2	Telugu Desam Party		3	Steady

== Administration ==
The corporation is administered by an elected body, headed by the Mayor. The present commissioner of the corporation is Y.Sai Sreekanth and the present mayor is Shaik Noorjahan. It has an Annual income of 426.681 million compared to Expenditure of 398.438 million.

== Civic works and services ==
There are 26 Protected water supply reservoirs in the city. There are 185 km (115 mi) of Kutcha drains, 221.64 km (137.72 mi) of C.C Drains and 6.80 km (4.23 mi) of Storm water drains. The city has a total of 7565 equipped Street lights. Eluru generates 82 Mt. Tons of Garbage per day.

== Functions ==
Eluru Municipal Corporation is created for the following functions:

- Planning for the town including its surroundings which are covered under its Department's Urban Planning Authority .
- Approving construction of new buildings and authorising use of land for various purposes.
- Improvement of the town's economic and Social status.
- Arrangements of water supply towards commercial, residential and industrial purposes.
- Planning for fire contingencies through Fire Service Departments.
- Creation of solid waste management, public health system and sanitary services.
- Working for the development of ecological aspect like development of Urban Forestry and making guidelines for environmental protection.
- Working for the development of weaker sections of the society like mentally and physically handicapped, old age and gender biased people.
- Making efforts for improvement of slums and poverty removal in the town.

== Revenue sources ==
The following are the Income sources for the Corporation from the Central and State Government.

=== Revenue from taxes ===
Following is the Tax related revenue for the corporation.

- Property tax.
- Profession tax.
- Entertainment tax.
- Grants from Central and State Government like Goods and Services Tax.
- Advertisement tax.

=== Revenue from non-tax sources ===
Following is the Non Tax related revenue for the corporation.

- Water usage charges.
- Fees from Documentation services.
- Rent received from municipal property.
- Funds from municipal bonds.
