= Bharat Institutions =

- Type: Private College
- Founders: Mr. Ch. Venugopal Reddy
- Affiliations: Jawaharlal Nehru Technological University Hyderabad
- Director: Prof. G. Kumaraswamy Rao
- Location: Mangalpally, Ibrahimpatnam Hyderabad, Telangana, 501510
- Website: biet.ac.in

Bharat Institutions is a group of educational and technical institutions at Hyderabad, Telangana started by the Chinta Reddy Madhusudhan Reddy Educational Society established in the year 1991.

== Group of institutions ==
- Bharat Institute of Engineering and Technology (2001)
- Bharat Institute of Technology and Science for Women (2008)
- Bharat Institute of Technology – Pharmacy (1999)
- Bharat Degree College for Women (1991)
- Bharat Post Graduate College for Women (1997)
- Bharat College of Education
- Bharat Post Graduate College
