= Yerragundla, Nandyal District =

Indian village

Yerragundla
- Village
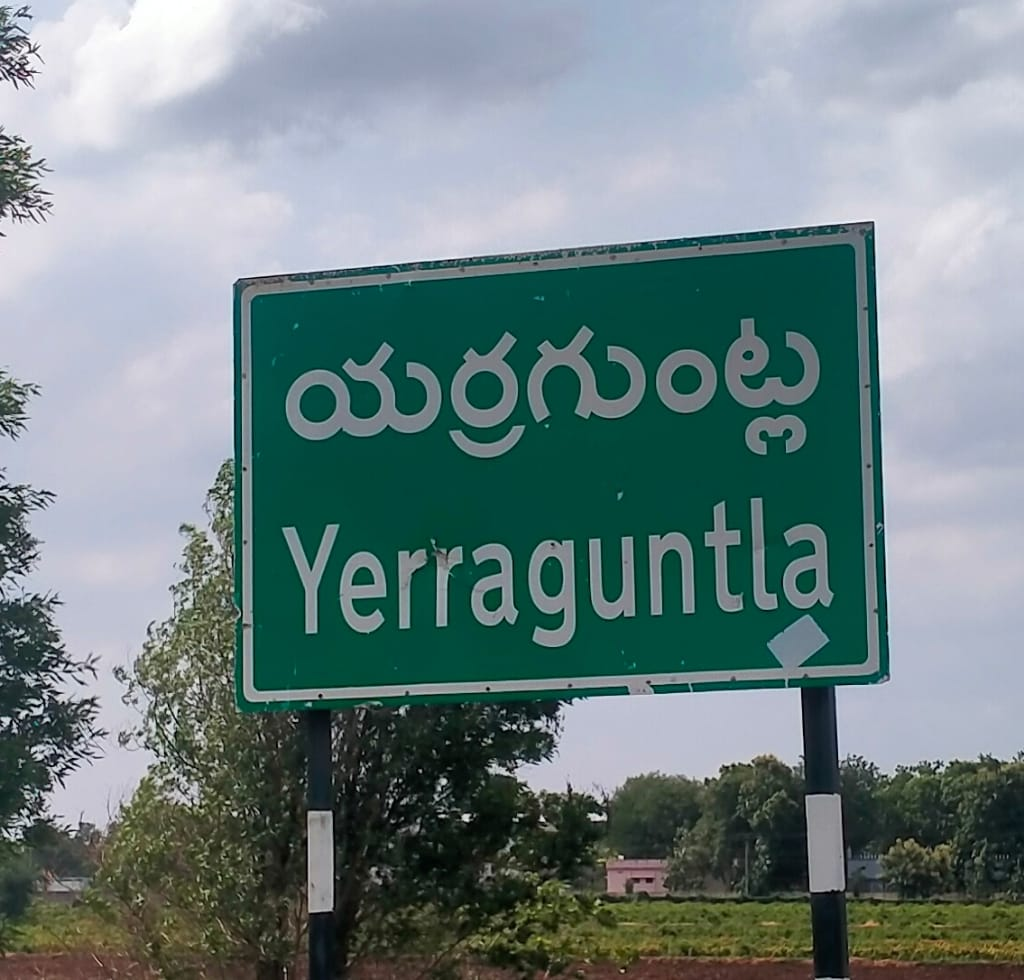
- Near NH-18
- Nickname: Yerraguntla
- Interactive map of Yerragundla
- Location in Andhra Pradesh, India Yerragundla (India)
- Coordinates: 15.2835892°N 78.4951422°E
- Country: India
- State: Andhra Pradesh
- District: Nandyal
- Sarpanch: Ayyalur Subhan Ali(Die)
- Vice Sarpanch: Sattar Prathapa Reddy
- Panchyati Secretary: P Venkateswarlu
- British Indian: 1927
- Named for: Cultivation

Government
  - Type: Member of the Legislative Assembly Andhra Pradesh
  - Body: Gram Panchayati
  - MP: Byreddy Shabari
  - MLA: Bhuma Akhila Priya

Area
  - Land: 42.24 km^{2} (16.31 sq mi)

Population
  - Total: 10,258
  - Density: 242/km^{2} (630/sq mi)
- Time zone: IST 5.30
- ZIP Code: 518510
- Vehicle registration: AP-39

Yerragundla is a village located midway between Kurnool and Kadapa on National Highway 40, in Sirivella mandal of Nandyal district, Andhra Pradesh, India.

== History ==
Yerragundla, historically known as Enagulataguntla in the 18th century, is a village where elephants were once known to visit a local stream to bathe. This small water body served as a hub for elephants, camels, and other animals to drink water and rest.

=== Demographics and location ===
As per available data, the population of Yerragundla is approximately 10,000. The village is situated in Sirivella mandal of Nandyal district in the state of Andhra Pradesh, India. It forms part of the Rayalaseema region.

Yerragundla is located about 25 km south of the district headquarters, Nandyal, 5 km from Sirivella, and approximately 280 km from the state capital, Amaravati.

=== Events ===
On 28 April 2024, Yerragundla was one of the locations visited during Day 2 of the Bus Yatra in Nandyal district.

=== Postal and nearby information ===
The PIN code of Yerragundla is 518510, and the postal head office is located in Sirivella.

Nearby villages include Erragudidinne (3 km), Vanikemdinne (4 km), Bathalur (5 km), Kotapadu (6 km), and Gumparamandinne (6 km). Yerragundla is bordered by Rudravaram mandal to the east, Dornipadu mandal to the west, Gospadu mandal to the north, and Allagadda taluka to the south.

== Flower merchants ==
Yerragundla village has a small but active flower market, with several local merchants engaged in the trade. The market has been operational since the early 2000s.

Notable flower merchants include:

1. A. Hussain Basha Flowers Merchant – Established in 2000, this is one of the earliest flower shops in the village.
2. SNR Flowers Merchant
3. SAR Flowers Merchant
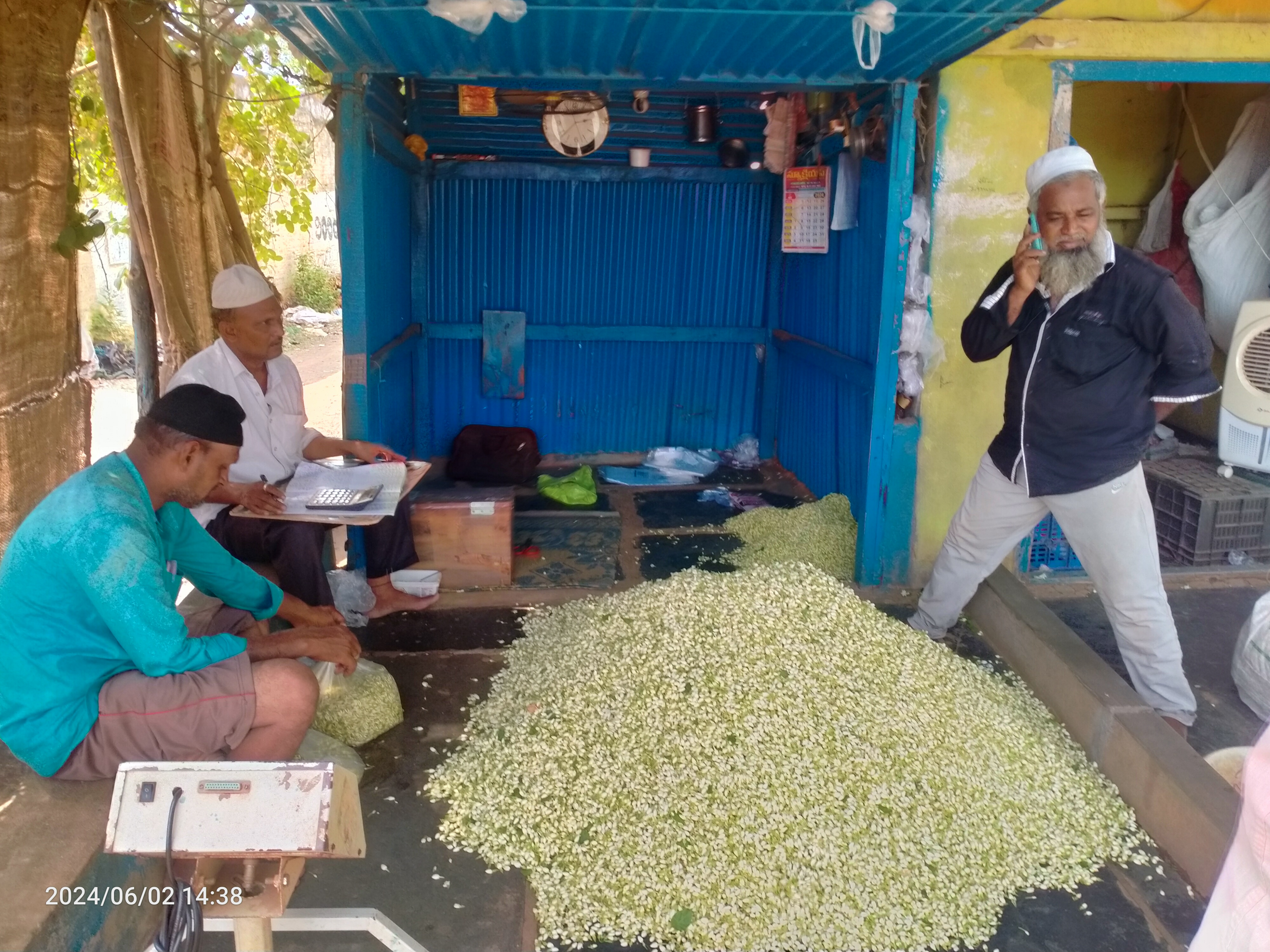
Shop Front

== Education ==
Yerragundla village has several primary, secondary, and junior college-level educational institutions, serving students from the ten villages within the gram panchayat jurisdiction.

Notable educational institutions in Yerragundla include:

- MMPS (Main) School
- Vimala English Medium School

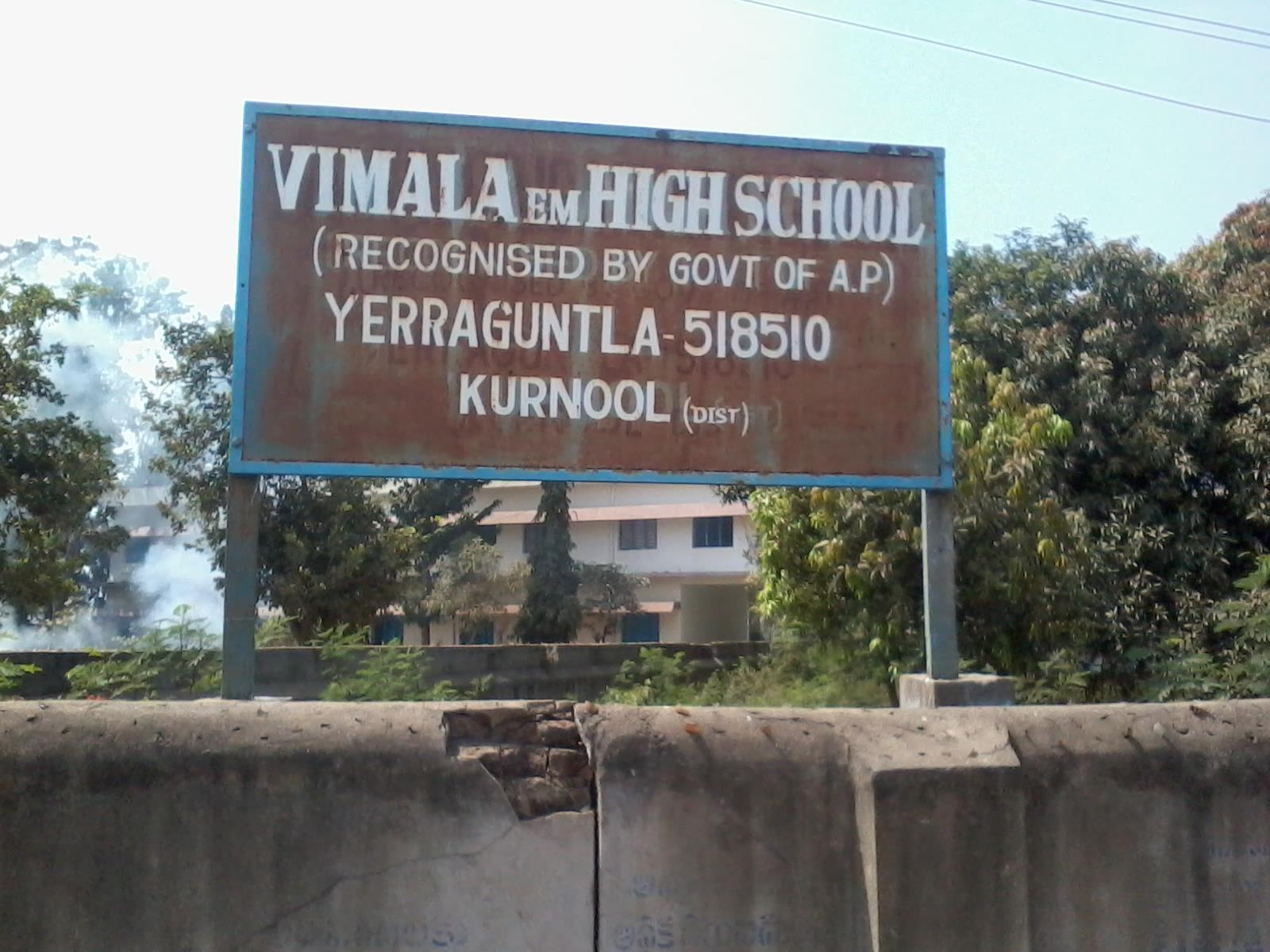
Vimala High School, Yerragundla, Kurnool district, Andhra Pradesh, India

- Gayatri School
- Ushayada School
- Zilla Parishad High School (ZPHS)
- Government Junior College, Yerragundla

== Geography ==
Yerragundla is located at 15.2835892°N, 78.4951422°E. The village has an average elevation of approximately 200 metres (656 feet) above sea level.

== Nearby villages ==
The following villages are located in and around the vicinity of Yerragundla:

- Gumparamandinne
- Rajanagaram
- Jeene Palle
- Vanikemdinne
- Venkatapuram
- W.Kottapalle
- Bathalur
- Chilakaluru
- Erragudidinne
- Nagireddi Palle
- Peruru
- Nandhipalle
- Muchineni Palle
- Pulla Kotla
- Venkatespuram

== Banks ==
Yerragundla is served by five banks, comprising four government banks and one private bank:

- Bank of India (BOI)
- State Bank Of India (SBI)
- ICICI Bank (private sector)
- Rayalaseema Grameena Bank
- Andhra Pragathi Grameena Bank
