= 2021 Guntur Municipal Corporation election =

Local election in India

Guntur Municipal Corporation (GMC)

Type
- Type: Municipal corporation (India)

Leadership
- Mayor: Kavati Manohar Naidu
- Deputy Mayor: Vanama Bala Vajrababu
- Municipal Commissioner: Smt Kirthi Chekuri IAS
- Seats: 57

Elections
- Last election: 10 March 2021

Website
- cdma.ap.gov.in

Guntur Municipal Corporation (GMC) is the civic body that governs the city of Guntur in the Indian state of Andhra Pradesh.

== History ==
The Guntur Municipality was created on 1 April 1888. It was named as a selection grade municipality in 1960 and to corporation in 1981. In 1985 Gunadala, Patamata and Bhavanipuram village panchayats, Payakapuram, Kundavari Kandrika were merged in the corporation.

== Administration ==
The area of Guntur Municipal Corporation is 61.88 km^{2} (23.89 mi^{2}). The Corporation is administered by an elected body headed by the Mayor. The corporation population as per the 2011 census was 1,039,518 with 527,307 males and a female population of 512,211. The present mayor is Kavati Manohar Naidu and the municipal commissioner is Sri Cherukuri Keerthi I.A.S .

== Civic services ==
The corporation provides protected drinking water to its public and is the forerunner in the state with every day supply of 39 million US gallons (150 megalitres) water to the city residents. The other services undertaken by the corporation authorities are: Internal roads extension; under ground drainage project with JNNURM; solid waste management which is recycled at waste to energy plants for power production; Health centers; Maternity hospitals; schools from elementary to high schools and even providing midday meals to students.

The Krishna River, groundwater and overhead tanks are the source of drinking water for the city residents. The underground and open draining systems are implemented for wastewater. There are also sewage treatment plants and the Budameru, Gundutippa, Islampeta and HB drains are utilized for draining out waste water. The Railway dumping yard is utilized for solid waste dumping and some of the solid waste produced is made useful by converting them into manures. There are a total of 32,262 Street lights in Corporation's area.

=== Infrastructure ===
Certain municipal sporting infrastructure in the city are maintained by the corporation, which includes, Indira Gandhi Stadium, indoor stadiums, swimming pools and Gymnasiums. There are parks and open spaces as part of city greenery projects.

== Awards and achievements ==
Accolades and awards won by VMC include:

- National Urban Water Award (2009)
- CRISIL Best Practices Award for the "Siti e-Governance" Project
- CSI Nihilent runner-up award was conferred by Ministry of Information and Technology
- Stockholm Challenge Award finalist
- ISO 9001 Certified for Quality Management System

== See also ==
- List of municipal corporations in India#Andhra Pradesh
