= 2021 Greater Visakhapatnam Municipal Corporation election =

Local election in India

- 10 March 2021

All 98 elected seats in the Greater Visakhapatnam Municipal Corporation 50 seats needed for a majority
- Turnout: 59.41%

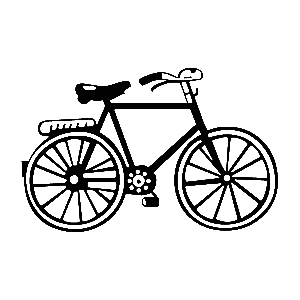

	First party	Second party	Third party
Party	YSRCP	TDP	Independents
Last election	Steady	Steady	Steady
Seats won	59	29	4
Seat change	Steady	Steady	Steady
Swing	Steady	Steady	Steady
	Fourth party	Fifth party	Sixth party
Party	JSP	CPI	CPI(M)
Last election	Steady	Steady	Steady
Seats won	3	1	1
Seat change	Steady	Steady	Steady
Popular vote	77,865		8,100
Swing	Steady	Steady	Steady
	Seventh party
Party	BJP
Last election	Steady
Seats won	1
Seat change	Steady
Popular vote	36,953
Swing	Steady
Mayor before election
P Janardhan
Indian National Congress
Elected Mayor
Golagani Hari Venkata Kumari
YSR Congress Party

The 2021 Greater Visakhapatnam Municipal Corporation election were held on 10 March 2021 to elect members to all 98 wards of the municipal corporation. The ruling YSRCP party was able to cross the magic figure and won the GVMC Elections 2021. Of 98 wards, YSRCP won 58 wards, TDP won 30 wards, Janasena Party won 4 wards, BJP won 1 ward, CPI, CPM 1 each and 3 wards are won by Independents.

== Election schedule ==
Event	Date
Date for Nominations	11 March 2020
Last Date for filing Nominations	13 March 2020
Date for scrutiny of nominations	14 March 2020
Date for commencement of withdrawal of candidature	2 March 2021
Last date for withdrawal of candidatures and publication of contesting candidates	3 March 2021
Date of poll	10 March 2021
Date of re-poll, if any	13 March 2021
Date of counting	14 March 2021

== Corporation election 2021 ==
No.	Party	Abbreviation	Flag	Symbol	Number of Corporators	Change
1.	YSR Congress Party	YSRCP			58	Steady
2.	Telugu Desam Party	TDP			30	Steady
3.	Independents	IND			4	Steady
4.	Jana Sena Party	JSP		Glass Tumbler	3	Steady
5.	Bharatiya Janata Party	BJP			1	Steady
6.	Communist Party of India (Marxist)	CPI(M)			1	Steady
7.	Communist Party of India	CPI			1	Steady

== Results by ward ==
S.no	Name	Candidate	Party
1		Akkaramani Padma	YSRCP
2		Gadu Chinna Kumari Lakshmi	TDP
3		Ganta Appalakonda	TDP
4		Doulapalli Yedu Kondala Rao	YSRCP
5		Melli Hemalatha	TDP
6		Muttamsetti Lakshmi Priyanka	YSRCP
7		Pilla Mangamma	TDP
8		Lodagala Apparao	YSRCP
9		Korkonda Venkata Ratna Swathi	YSRCP
10		Maddila Ramalakshmi	TDP
11		Golagani Hari Venkata Kumari	YSRCP
12		Akkaramani Rohini	YSRCP
13		Kella Sunitha	YSRCP
14		K Anil Kumar Raju	YSRCP
15		Appari Srividya	Independent
16		Melli Lakshmi	YSRCP
17		Gedela Lavanya	YSRCP
18		Golagani Manga	TDP
19		Nooli Nookaratna	TDP
20		Nekkella Lakshmi	YSRCP
21		Chennuboyina Srinivasa Rao	YSRCP
22		LV Narayana Murthy	JSP
23		Gudla Vijayasai	YSRCP
24		Saadi Padmareddy	YSRCP
25		Saripalli Govind	YSRCP
26		Mukka Sravani	TDP
27		Golagani Veera Rao	TDP
28		Palla Appalakonda	YSRCP
29		Urikooti Narayana Rao	YSRCP
30		Koduru Appalaratnam	YSRCP
31		Bipin Kumar Jain	YSRCP
32		Kandula Nagaraju	Independent
33		Beesetti Vasantha Lakshmi	JSP
34		Thota Padmavati	YSRCP
35		Villuri Bhaskara Rao	Independent
36		Masipogu Mary Jones	YSRCP
37		Chenna Janaki Ram	YSRCP
38		Godi Vijayalakshmi	TDP
39		Mohammad Sadiq	Independent
40		Gundapu Nageswara Rao	YSRCP
41		Kodigudla Poornima	TDP
42		Alla Leelavati	YSRCP
43		Peddisetti Ushasri	YSRCP
44		Banala Satya Srinivas	YSRCP
45		Kampa Hanok	YSRCP
46		Kattamuri Satish	YSRCP
47		Kantipaamu Kameswari	YSRCP
48		Gankala Kavitha	BJP
49		Allu Shankara Rao	YSRCP
50		Vavilapalli Prasad	YSRCP
51		Reyyi Venkataramana	YSRCP
52		Jiyyani Sridhar	YSRCP
53		Bartak Ali	YSRCP
54		Challa Rajani	YSRCP
55		KVN Sasi Kala	YSRCP
56		Saragadam Rajasekhar	TDP
57		Murruvani Nanaji	YSRCP
58		Gulivindala Lavanya	YSRCP
59		Purri Purna Sri	YSRCP
60		PV Suresh	YSRCP
61		Konathala Sudha	YSRCP
62		Balla Lakshmana Rao	YSRCP
63		Galla Polipalli	TDP
64		Dalli Govind Reddy	JSP
65		Boddu Narsimhapatrudu	YSRCP
66		Mohammed Imran	YSRCP
67		Palla Srinivas	TDP
68		G Venkata Sai Anusha	YSRCP
69		Kaki Govinda Reddy	TDP
70		Urukuti Ramachandra Rao	YSRCP
71		Rajaana Ramarao	YSRCP
72		AJ Stalin	CPI
73		Bhupatiraju Sujata	YSRCP
74		Tippala Vamsi Reddy	YSRCP
75		Puli Jhansi Lakshmi Bai	TDP
76		Gandham Srinu	TDP
77		Battu Surya Kumari	YSRCP
78		B Ganga Rao	CPM
79		Rowthu Srinivas	TDP
80		Konatala Neelima	YSRCP
81		Peela Lakshmi Sowjanya	YSRCP
82		Mandapati Sunitha	YSRCP
83		Jajula Prasanna Lakshmi	YSRCP
84		Madamsetti Chinathalli	TDP
85		Illapu Varalakshmi	YSRCP
86		Lella Koteswara Rao	TDP
87		Bonda Jagannadham	TDP
88		Melli Mutyala Naidu	TDP
89		Dadi Venkata Ramesh	TDP
90		Bommidi Ramana	TDP
91		Kunche Jyotsna	YSRCP
92		Behara Venkata Swarnalatha Sivadevi	YSRCP
93		Raparthi Kanna	TDP
94		Balla Srinivasa Rao	TDP
95		Mummana Demudu	YSRCP
96		Peela Srinivasa Rao	TDP
97		Shanavati Vasantha	TDP
98		PV Narasimham	TDP
