= V. Dinesh Reddy =

Indian police officer

- Education: Hyderabad Public School
- Alma mater: Madras Christian College, St. Stephen's College, Delhi
- Known for: Director General of Andhra Pradesh Police (Retired), President of All India Hockey Federation
- Police career
- IPS: Indian Police Service (Andhra Pradesh Cadre)
- Allegiance: India
- Service years: 1977 - 2013
- Status: Retired
- Rank: Director General of Police
- Other work: President of Hyderabad Hockey Association, President of All India Hockey Federation, Politician (YSR Congress Party)

V. Dinesh Reddy is an Indian police officer from the state of Andhra Pradesh serving as the Director General of Andhra Pradesh Police. He is an Indian Police Service (IPS) officer from the 1977 batch of the Andhra Pradesh cadre. He completed his schooling from Hyderabad public school (HPS) and college from Madras Christian College (MCC) and St.Stephens Delhi. Dinesh Reddy joined the Indian Police Service on 30 July 1977 from the Andhra Pradesh Cadre and he retired serving as the Director General of Andhra Pradesh Police in 2013.

He held positions such as Hyderabad Range DIG, Warangal Range DIG, Excise and Prohibition Commissioner, IG Railways, Additional DG of Law and Order AP, Commissioner of Police, Hyderabad City, APSRTC MD, Director of Vigilance and Enforcement and Director General of Andhra Pradesh Police. He worked in both Telangana and Andhra regions. He is also keen in sports and supports it. He was elected and he served as The President of Hyderabad Hockey Association and then also as The President of All India Hockey Federation.

== Political Campaign ==
Dinesh reddy, contested on a YSR Congress Party ’s ticket as a Lok Sabha candidate from Malkjgiri Constituency IN 2014. This constituency is one of the Lok Sabha (Lower House of the Parliament) constituencies in Telangana. This constituency came into existence in 2008, following the implementation of delimitation of parliamentary constituencies based on the recommendations of the Delimitation Commission of India constituted in 2002, Dinesh Reddy joined BJP.
