= Nimmagadda Ramesh Kumar =

1982 batch IAS officer of Andhra Pradesh

1st Election commissioner - Andhra Pradesh State
- In office 2016–2021

Special chief secretary - Governor of Andhra Pradesh

Principal secretary of finance

Executive member Tirumala Tirupati Devasthanam

Personal details
- Born: 8 March 1956 (age 70)
- Occupation: Indian Administrative Service

Nimmagadda Ramesh Kumar was sworn in as 1st Andhra Pradesh State Election Commissioner (after Telangana separation) on 1 April 2016 by Governor Narasimhan. He belongs to 1982 batch of Indian Administrative Service. He served as Special Chief Secretary to Governor before this. He also worked as Executive Officer of Tirumala Tirupati Devasthanams(TTD) and as the Principal Secretary of Finance.

== Education ==
Yes He earned B.A. (History), LL.B. (Law) degrees and did his post graduate study in Economics.

== Career ==
He was selected to Indian Administrative Service in 1982. His first job was as a Sub-collector in 1984. He served in different departments in various roles over his long career. He worked as the Special Chief Secretary to Governor until 31 March 2016 and was appointed as the State Election Commissioner for Andhra Pradesh by Chandra Babu Naidu. He also worked as the Executive Officer of Tirumala Tirupati Devasthanams(TTD) and as the Principal Secretary of Finance.

=== Appointment as Andhra Pradesh State Election Commissioner ===
After his retirement, he was appointed as Andhra Pradesh State Election Commissioner on 1 April 2016. In 2020 March, after the first phase of nominations for MPTC/ZPTC elections were completed, he paused Elections to local bodies without consulting state government health department and chief secretary, due to Covid 2019 as a measure of public health. As the state government did not like this step, it took steps to change the duration for the office of SEC to three years from five years and also changed the eligible person as retired high court judge. Thus, he was removed from his post mid term and Justice Kanagaraj was appointed as the new SEC. Nimmagadda filed a court case against these actions in High court and the High court cancelled state government order and restored his position as SEC (subject to Supreme court orders). Thus he became the third State Election commissioner on July 31, 2020. During run up to 2021 Andhra Pradesh local elections, Ramesh formed a team, comprising a Secretary to State Election Commission, K. Kanna Babu, IAS as well as a Special Officer N. Sanjay, IPS.

== See this also ==
- Andhra Pradesh State Election Commission
- Andhra Pradesh Government
