= Venkatarama Reddy =

Indian police chief

Raja Bahadur Venkata Rama Reddy OBE
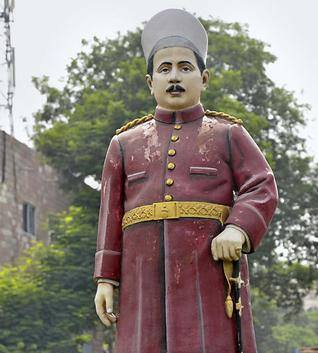
- Statue of Venkatarama Reddy
- Born: 22 August 1869; Rayanpet
- Died: 25 January 1953 (aged 83)
- Police career
- Allegiance: British India; Hyderabad State
- Status: Retired
- Rank: Kotwal (Police Commissioner]
- Awards: Officer of the Order of the British Empire; Raja Bahadur

Raja Bahadur Venkatarama Reddy (22 August 1869 – 25 January 1953) was a police officer who served as the Commissioner of Police, Hyderabad City. He was the first Hindu Kotwal of Hyderabad State, as in the late 19th and early 20th century, during the rule of the Nizams, the position of Kotwal of Hyderabad (Police commissioner), was usually held by Muslims. His tenure lasted 14 years and commanded great respect among the public for his outstanding Police administration.

Many sources state that the 7th Nizam was very Fond of Raja Venkatrama Reddy and was very Close to him.

== Early life ==
Reddy was born in August 1869 in Rayanipet village of Wanaparthy Samsthan in Kingdom of Hyderabad (now Mahbubnagar district). His father was a Patel of some eight villages and was well off. He was a grand nephew of the then Raja of Wanaparthy. His mother died three days after his birth, whereas his father when he only 5 years old. Caretaker of Wanaparthy Samsthan, William Wahab, then took care of him. The Raja of Wanaparthy had employed a Catholic teacher to educate some of his boys. He was educated in his village and then at Wanaparthy where he became a classmate of Raja Rameshwar Rao II.

== Life ==
The Commissioner of Police of the City of Hyderabad used to be called the 'Kotwal'. It is one of the oldest establishment and used to be the most powerful job in the H.E.H. Nizam's Government.

As a city police commissioner, he also headed the Baldia in Ex-Officio cadre. He is responsible for peace and neatness in the city. He has introduced street lighting as a security measure (Those days it was called Kandil). He appointed dedicated staff for the purpose. He introduced a weekly special sanitation programme in all streets, through which it was possible to see the clean city every Friday morning.

Venkatram Reddy serving at Raichur, Wahab, the caretaker died suddenly. Venkatram stayed on at Raichur and became a ward of Wahab’s successor, a Pathan named Nazar Muhammad Khan. By now the young man had acquired some rudimentary education. Khan got him the job of Grade IV Amin in the police.

He served in various districts and because of his diligence rose gradually. While working at Nizamabad, he helped trace a British deserter from the army and was given a reward of eleven rupees. Hemkin, the Chief of State Police, adjudged him as the best officer in the state. He was appointed head of the district police in 1901 and served in a number of districts including the Atraf-e-Balda – area around the city. His old classmate who was now the Raja of Wanaparthy asked for his services as Secretary of the Estate, on promotion.

When Nawab Imad Jung Bahadur became the Kotwal of Hyderabad, he asked Venkatram to be appointed as his First Assistant. He worked in that capacity for six years and instituted many reforms in the city police. Nawab Imad Jung Bahadur died in harness in 1920.

== As Kotwal ==
Venkatarama was asked to see the 7th Nizam (Mir Osman Ali Khan). Although he had worked in the Nizam’s Private Estate, he had never met the ruler before. He was therefore naturally very jittery. It was a Friday and when the Assistant Kotwal presented himself at the King Kothi. After his prayers, the Nizam looked up the nervous officer four or five times and then said, 'Well, you can go'. The next day he was appointed the Kotwal. From then on he would see the Nizam not every day, but sometimes several times a day.

Venkatarama Reddy handled his delicate job adroitly. Not only the 7th Nizam, but also members of both the leading communities were very happy with them. That was a time when the Freedom Struggle was gaining strength. Hyderabad was engulfed by the Khalifat Movement. A group of agitators came from Ahmedabad and joined the local leaders in the demonstration. The demonstration became violent and the doors and windows of the Residency court were smashed. Venkatarama Reddy himself went to the site and persuaded the leaders to adopt peaceful means. He also ensured peace at the Ganesh procession by making four policemen the bearers of the palanquin carrying the idol.

== Honours ==
The Nizam gave him the title of Raja Bahadur on his birthday. In the 1931 New Year Honours, Reddy was appointed an Officer of the Order of the British Empire (OBE). After many extensions of service, he finally retired in 1934. In relaxation of rules for pension, instead of half his salary, he was given a pension of 1,000 rupees a month. Immediately thereafter, he was appointed Special Officer of the Nizam’s private estate (Sarf-e-Khas). He was also made chairman of the Commission for Inquiry into the Indebtedness of the Sahibzadas.

He was an active freemason. The walls of Goshamahal Baradari are adorned with portraits of many freemasons including Raja Bahadur Venkatarama Reddy.

== Death and legacy ==
When Raja Bahadur Venkatarama Reddy died in 1953, he had only thirty rupees in cash on his person. His first wife died a few months after the birth of his son, Ranga Reddy. His second wife had already two children. The daughter, Narsamma was married to a contractor who built Pathergatti. The son, Laxma Reddy did Bar-at Law, married two English ladies one after another and became a judge of the High Court. He had three sons and a daughter who are no more.

The Telangana State Police Academy was renamed Raja Bahadur Venkatarama Reddy Telangana State Police Academy by the Government of Telangana.

Raja Bahadur Venkata Rama Reddy Women’s College was established in 1954 by Hyderabad Mahila Vidhya Sangham (HMVS), a non-profit educational society with a vision to empower women through quality education. The College is the second oldest women’s college in Hyderabad. It owes its existence to the foresight of Sri. Raja Bahadur Venkata Rama Reddy, Kotwal (Commissioner of Police) of erstwhile Hyderabad State, who believed strongly believed modern education was essential for women empowerment.

== See also ==
- Osman Ali Khan, Asaf Jah VII
- Nizams of Hyderabad
