= 2021 Vizianagaram Municipal Corporation election =

Local election in India

- 10 March 2021

All 50 elected seats in the Vizianagaram Municipal Corporation 26 seats needed for a majority
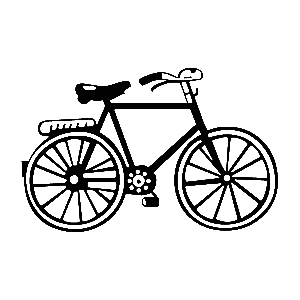

	First party	Second party	Third party
Party	TDP	YSRCP	JSP
	Fourth party	Fifth party
Party	INC	BJP

The 2021 Vizianagaram Municipal Corporation election was an Indian community election that was scheduled for 10 March 2021 to elect members to all 50 wards of the municipal corporation.

== Election schedule ==
Event	Date
Date for Nominations	11 March 2020
Last Date for filing Nominations	13 March 2020
Date for scrutiny of nominations	14 March 2020
Date for commencement of withdrawal of candidature	2 March 2021
Last date for withdrawal of candidatures and publication of contesting candidates	3 March 2021
Date of poll	10 March 2021
Date of re-poll, if any	13 March 2021
Date of counting	14 March 2021
