= A. K. Khan (police officer) =

Indian police officer

Abdul Khayyum Khan
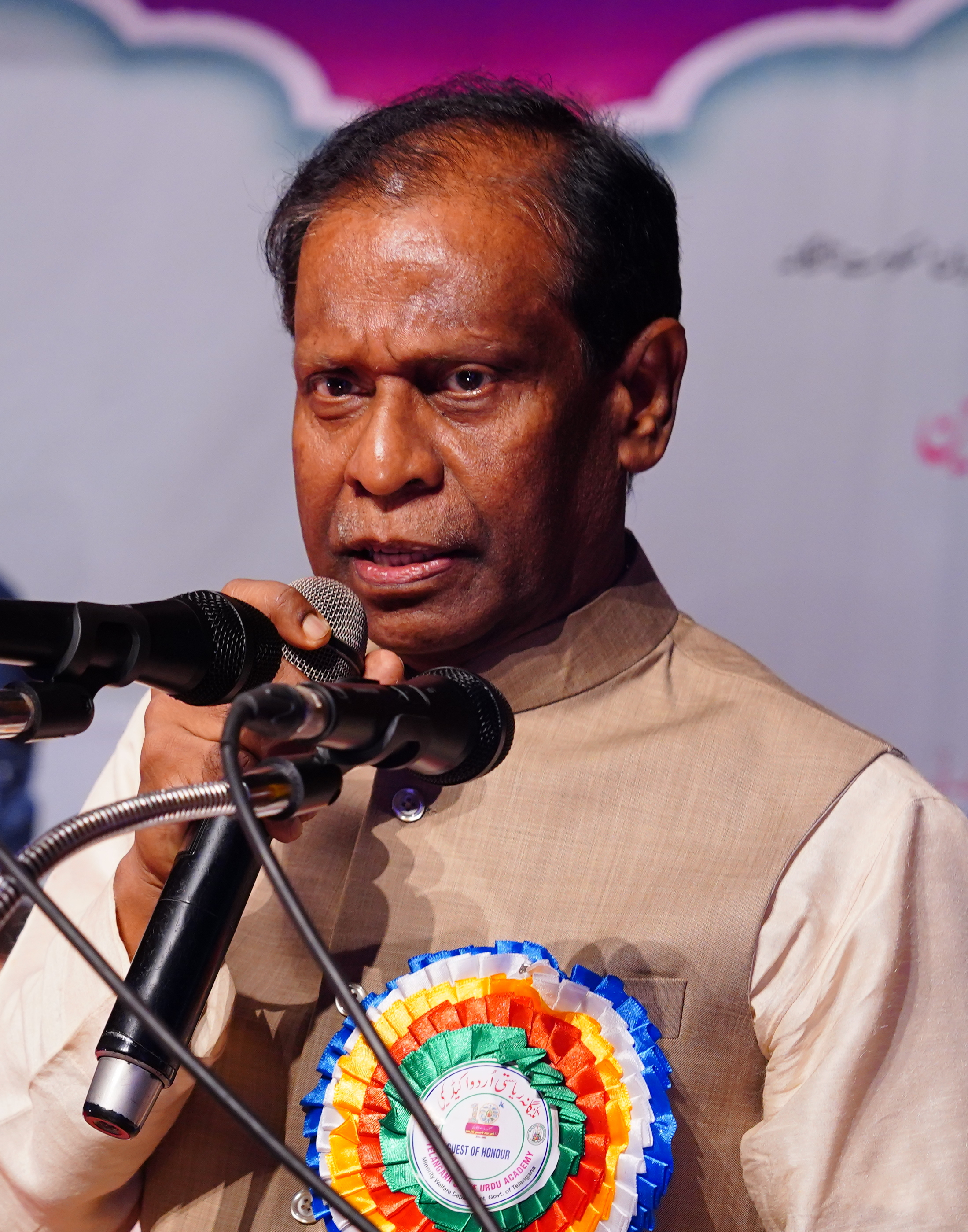
- Abdul Khayyum Khan Speeking at Telangana Formation Decennial Celebrations in Ravindra Bharathi
- Born: December 6, 1956 (age 69); India
- Occupation: IPS Officer (retired)
- Known for: Strict enforcement of drunk driving laws
- Title: Advisor to Government of Telangana on Minority Affairs

Abdul Khayyum Khan (born 6 December 1956) is a retired Indian Police Service (IPS) officer and former Commissioner of Police, Hyderabad City, India. Khan introduced a rule that drunk drivers would be sent to jail with heavy penalties to curb alcoholism. He later served as Director General of the Anti-Corruption Bureau (ACB) in the newly formed Telangana state before retirement. In 2015, he was appointed Advisor to the Government of Telangana on Minority Affairs, a cabinet-rank post.

== Early life and education ==
Khan was born on 6 December 1956. Before joining the IPS, he studied chemistry and worked briefly as a chemist before clearing the civil services examination. He belongs to the 1981 batch of the Indian Police Service, Andhra Pradesh cadre.

== Career ==
=== Early assignments ===
Khan served in several districts of undivided Andhra Pradesh as Superintendent of Police, including Nalgonda, Prakasam and East Godavari. He also worked as Deputy Commissioner of Police (Traffic), Hyderabad before elevation to senior posts.

=== Commissioner of Police, Hyderabad ===
Khan served as Commissioner of Police, Hyderabad City from 2010 to 2012. During his tenure he implemented reforms including stricter measures against drunk driving, jail terms for offenders and higher fines.

=== Director General of ACB, Telangana ===
Following the creation of the State of Telangana, Khan became Director General of the Anti-Corruption Bureau (ACB) of Telangana where he oversaw the reorganization of the bureau.

=== Advisor to Government of Telangana on Minority Affairs ===
In 2015, the Government of Telangana appointed Khan as Advisor (Cabinet-rank) on Minority Affairs, charging him with implementing welfare and education initiatives for minority communities. His advisory tenure was extended by the government in late 2021.

== Policy initiatives ==
- Introduced robust anti-drunk driving laws in Hyderabad including mandatory jail sentences for offenders.
- Advocated increased scholarships and overseas education programs for minority youth in Telangana.
- Supported stress-management and welfare programmes for police forces in Telangana.

== Recognition ==
Media outlets have profiled Khan’s career and reforms, noting his transition from a chemist to a senior police officer known for community-oriented policing.
