= 2021 Ongole Municipal Corporation election =

Local election in India

- 10 March 2021

All 98 elected seats in the Ongole Municipal Corporation 98 seats needed for a majority
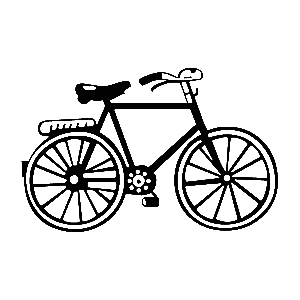

	First party	Second party	Third party
Party	TDP	YSRCP	JSP
	Fourth party	Fifth party
Party	INC	BJP

The 2021 Ongole Municipal Corporation election was held on 10 March 2021 to elect members to all 98 wards of the municipal corporation.

== Election schedule ==
Event	Date
Date for Nominations	11 March 2020
Last Date for filing Nominations	13 March 2020
Date for scrutiny of nominations	14 March 2020
Date for commencement of withdrawal of candidature	2 March 2021
Last date for withdrawal of candidatures and publication of contesting candidates	3 March 2021
Date of poll	10 March 2021
Date of re-poll, if any	13 March 2021
Date of counting	14 March 2021

== Results by ward ==
Results
Ward	Winner			Runner Up			Margin	
#	Name	Candidate	Party	Votes	Candidate	Party	Margin	Votes
1								
