= Commissioner of the Hyderabad City Police =

Police official of Hyderabad district

Commissioner of Police, Hyderabad City
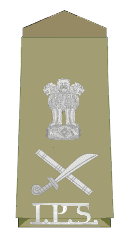
- Rank Insignia of the Police Commissioner

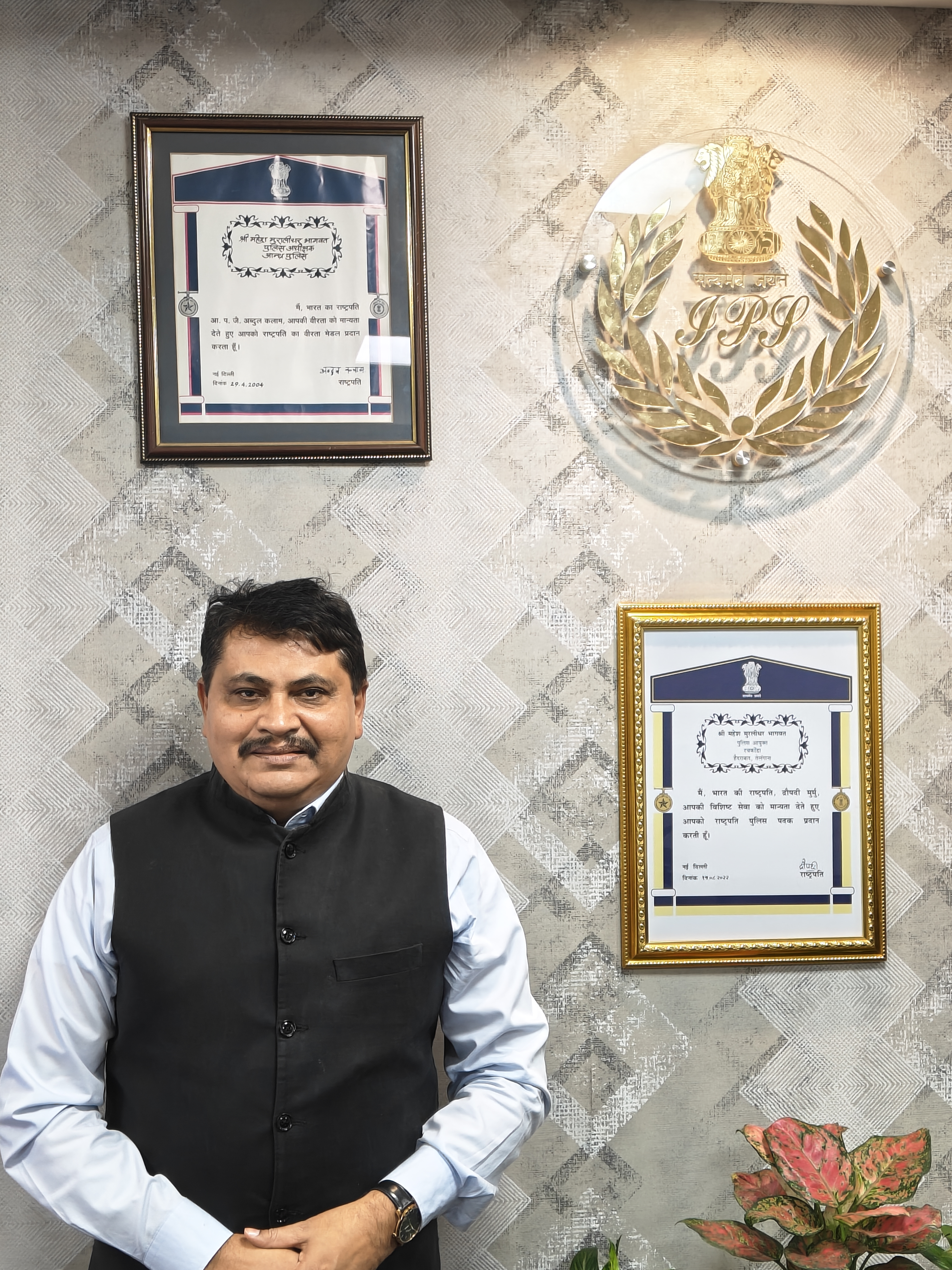
- Incumbent; Mahesh Bhagwat since 13 November 2026
- Hyderabad City Police
- Status: Head of the Hyderabad City Police
- Abbreviation: CP, Hyd
- Reports to: Home Minister of Telangana
- Seat: Integrated Command and Control Centre
- Appointer: Chief Minister of Telangana
- Inaugural holder: Hasan Ali Khan (Talib-Ud Dawlah)
- Formation: 1847
- Unofficial names: Kotwal
- Website: Official website Hyderabad City Police

The Commissioner of Police, Hyderabad City is the head of Hyderabad City Police.

The commissioner is an Indian Police Service officer of the rank of Director general of police (DGP) or Additional director general of police (ADGP). The commissioner heads the police force in a jurisdiction consisting of approximately 650 km^{2} area and home to a population of 1.6 Crore (16 million) with a 40 lakh (4 million) floating population.

== History ==
The post of Commissioner of Police, Hyderabad City has its roots in Hyderabad State during the Nizam period. Called Kotwal-e-Balda or Kotwal for short, the Commissioner of police was appointed by the Nizam of Hyderabad. Apart from holding the powers and privileges as the head of police, he also enjoyed certain judicial and civil powers. He was the chief adviser to the Nizam on all police matters and was part of his durbar. Most of the Kotwals were nobles. The first Hindu kotwal was Raja Bahadur Venkat Rama Reddy, who served as the Commissioner during the reign of Mir Osman Ali Khan Nizam VII.

== List of Commissioners ==
=== Hyderabad State (1847-1947) ===
S.No	Name	Batch	Tenure	References
1	Hasan Ali Khan (Talib-Ud Dawlah)		1-1-1847 to 27–12–1847	
2	Md. Vazir Jamadar		28-12-1847 to 4–10–1851	
3	Fazluddin Khan		5-10-1851 to 4–1–1853	
4	Mohammed Syeed Hussain		5-1-1853 to 9–11–1853	
5	Nawab Ghalib Ud Dawlah		10-11-1853 to 8–5–1855	
6	Grand Son Of Zafar-Ud-Dawlah		9-5-1855 to 5–6–1873	
7	Nawab Zourawar Jung		6-6-1873 to 22–4–1874	
8	Inayat Hussain Khan		23-4-1874 to 4–5–1884	
9	Nawab Akber –Ul-Mulk		5-5-1884 to 7–4–1905	
10	Vazir Ali Nawab (Sulthan Yawar Jung)		8-4-1905 to 24–12–1912	
11	KB Abdul Kareem Lal Khan		25-4-1912 to 16–9–1912	
12	Mir Mubarak Ali Khan		17-9-1912 to 7–11–1912	
13	Nawab Emad Jung II		8-11-1912 to 22–3–1920	
14	Raja Bahadur Venkat Rama Reddy		23-3-1920 to 30–6–1934	
15	Nawab Rahmat Yar Jung Bahadur		1-7-1934 to 5–6–1945	
16	Nawab Deen Yar Jung Bahadur		6-6-1945 to 31–7–1947	

=== Hyderabad State (1948–1956) ===
S.No	Name	Batch	Tenure	References
17	Rusthum Ji Shapur Ji		1-8-1947 to 20–3–1949	
18	S. N. Reddy M.A		21-3-1949 to 31–8–1951	
19	Shiv Kumar Lal, IPS	1935 (SPS)	1-9-1951 to 30–6–1953	
20	A. Sundaram Pillai, IPS		1-7-1953 to 14–5–1954	
21	B. L. Khedkar, IPS		15-5-1954 to 25–9–1954	

=== Andhra Pradesh (1956–2014) ===
S.No	Name	Batch	Tenure	References
22	C. Ranga Swamy Iyengar, IPS		26-9-1954 to 18-5-1957 (again 14–7–1967)	
23	S. Vijaya Rangam, IPS	1942	19-5-1957 to 13–5–1959	
24	B. N. Kaliya Rao, IPS		14-5-1959 to 2-4-1961 (Again 22–5–1967)	
25	S. P. Satur, IPS	1946	3-4-1961 to 31-8-1964 (Again 19–2–1963)	
26	Prahlad Singh, IPS	1944	1-9-1964 to 31–1–1970	
27	Abdus Salam Khan, IPS	1947 (SPS)	1-2-1970 to 13–7–1973	
28	P. V. G. Krishnama Charyulu, IPS	1951 (RR)	14-7-1973 to 14–12–1975	
29	K. N. Sreenivasan, IPS	1952 (RR)	15-12-1975 to 22–8–1976	
30	M. A. Shafiullah Khan, IPS	1952 (RR)	23-8-1976 to 27–12–1977	
31	Muni Swamy, IPS	1952 (SPS)	28-12-1977 to 21–14–1978	
32	P. V. Pavithran, IPS		22-4-1978 to 1–5–1981	
33	C. G. Saldanha, IPS	1953 (RR)	2-5-1981 to 26–8–1981	
34	P. Ponnaiya, IPS		27-8-1981 to 9–11–1982	
35	S. Chandra Shekaran, IPS		10-11-1982 to 13–4–1983	
36	K. Vijayarama Rao, IPS		14-4-1983 to 27-8-1984 (Again 7–4–1989)	
37	R. Prabhakar Rao, IPS	1957 (RR)	28-8-1984 to 4-3-1986 (Again 30–12–1989)	
38	T. Surya Narayan Rao, IPS	1958 (RR)	5-3-1986 to 14–2–1989	
39	V. Apparao, IPS		15-2-1989 to 4-5-1990 (Again 25–12–1994)	
40	Ismail Pullanna, IPS	1961 (RR)	5-5-1990 to 15–8–1990	
41	G. Gurunath Rao, IPS		16-8-1990 to 28–11–1990	
42	M. V. Bhaskara Rao, IPS	1962 (RR)	29-11-1990 to 15–4–1993	
43	H. J. Dora, IPS	1965 (RR)	16-4-1993 to 29–11–1996	
44	C. Rama Swamy, IPS	1968 (RR)	30-11-1996 to 29–6–1997	
45	R. P. Singh, IPS	1973 (RR)	30-6-1997 to 11-9-1998 (Again 13–10–2003)	
46	S. R. Sukumara, IPS	1967 (RR)	12-9-1998 to 14–12–2000	
47	P. Ramulu, IPS	1967 (RR)	15-12-2000 to 24–2–2002	
48	M. V. Krishna Rao, IPS	1974 (RR)	25-2-2002 to 30–11–2004	
49	V. Dinesh Reddy, IPS	1977 (RR)	1-12-2004 to 29–9–2005	
50	A. K. Mohanty, IPS	1975 (RR)	30-9-2005 to 11–12–2007	
51	Balwinder Singh, IPS	1976 (RR)	12-12-2007 to 20–1–2008	
52	B. Prasada Rao, IPS	1979 (RR)	21-1-2008 to 21–1–2010	
53	A. K. Khan, IPS	1981 (RR)	22-1-2010 to 20–5–2012	
54	Anurag Sharma, IPS	1982 (RR)	21-5-2012 to 31–5–2014	

=== Telangana ===
S.No	Name	Batch	Tenure	References
55	M. Mahender Reddy, IPS	1986 (RR)	2-6-2014 to 11–11–2017	
56	V. V. Srinivasa Rao, IPS	1995 (RR)	12-11-2017 to 11–3–2018	
57	Anjani Kumar, IPS	1990 (RR)	12-3-2018 to 24–12–2021	
58	C. V. Anand, IPS	1991 (RR)	25-12-2021 to 11–10–2023	
59	Sandeep Shandilya, IPS	1993 (RR)	13-10-2023 to 13–12–2023	
60	K. Sreenivasa Reddy, IPS	1994 (RR)	13-12-2023 to 7–9–2024	
61	C. V. Anand, IPS	1991 (RR)	7-9-2024 to 27-9-2025	
62	V. C. Sajjanar, IPS	1996 (RR)	27-9-2025 to 12-11-2026	
63	Mahesh Bhagwat	13-11-2026 to "Present"		
