= NTR Police Commissionerate =

Law enforcement agency

Agency overview
- Formed: 1983; 43 years ago

Jurisdictional structure
- Operations jurisdiction: Vijayawada, Andhra Pradesh, India
- Legal jurisdiction: Vijayawada

Operational structure
- Headquarters: NTR Police Commissionerate, Vijayawada, Andhra Pradesh- 520002
- Agency executive: S. V. Rajashekhar Babu IPS, Commissioner
- Parent agency: Andhra Pradesh Police

Website
- Official website

NTR Police Commissionerate is the local law enforcement agency for the city of Vijayawada, NTR district, Andhra Pradesh and is headed by the city police commissioner.

== Organizational structure ==
The NTR Police Commissionerate is headed by Commissioner of Police and Two Deputy commissioner of Police and Assistant Commissioner of Police with particular number of police stations.

== Current structure ==
The following zones fall under the NTR Police Commissionerate:

- East Zone
- West Zone
- Central Zone
- South Zone
- North Zone
- Traffic Zone

== Command Control Center ==
NTR Police Commissionerate has a Command Control Center. With the help of this center, the city police can monitor the whole city.

== See also ==
- Andhra Pradesh Police
- Visakhapatnam City Police
