= Mahesh Bhagwat =

Indian Police Service officer

Mahesh Muralidhar Bhagwat
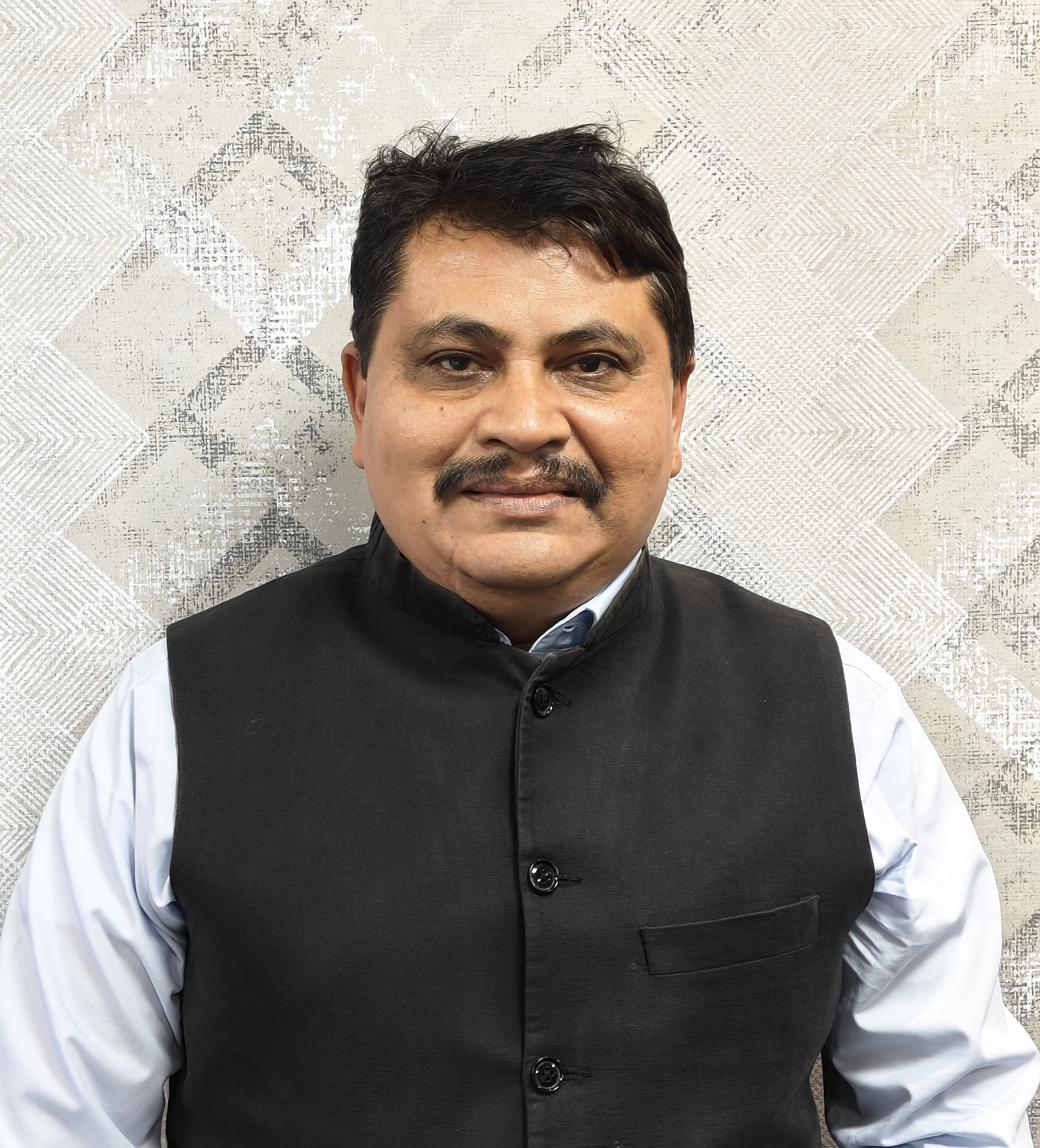
- Born: Pathardi, District Ahmednagar, Maharashtra
- Occupation: Indian Police Service officer
- Known for: Anti-human trafficking, community policing and mentorship to UPSC Civil services, Forest services and CAPF aspirants.
- Awards: Trafficking in Persons (TIP) Report Heroes Award (2017) from US Department of state. Winner of President of India Police medal for Gallantry 2004, Police Medal for meritorious service 2011 and President Police Medal for Distinguished service 2022.

Mahesh Muralidhar Bhagwat is an Indian Police Service (IPS) officer who received the U.S. Department of State's Trafficking in Persons Report Heroes Award in 2017. In April 2026, Bhagwat was promoted to the rank of Director General of Police and continued in the Law and Order post.

He served as 1st and longest commissioner of Police Rachakonda in Hyderabad east side for 6.5 years. He was recently transferred from the post of ADGP Railways, Road Safety and Legal Telangana to ADG Law and order. .

He has also acted as a resource person at the National Police Training Academy in Hyderabad and other states, providing training programs on community policing and anti-trafficking efforts.

== Education ==
Bhagwat holds a Bachelor of Engineering degree in Civil Engineering from the College of Engineering Pune and a Bachelor of Laws (LLB) degree from Osmania University, Hyderabad. Bhagwat has done his schooling from ZP school till 4th standard and Sri Tilok Jain Vidyalaya till 10th standard at Pathardi, District Ahmednagar, Maharashtra from 1974 to 1984. Done his intermediate studies from SP College Pune in 1984 to 1986.

== Career and Postings ==
Bhagwat joined the Indian Police Service (IPS) in 1995. Throughout his career, he has held various positions:

=== Early career ===
- 1997-1999: Served in Manipur for two years after completing foundation course in LBSNAA Mussoorie and IPS training at SVPNPA Hyderabad
- 1999-2014: Transferred to Andhra Pradesh, served in various roles in the unified state as SP Adilabad, Nalgonda, Kadapa and Khammam Districts, DCPs and joint CPs postings in Hyderabad & Cyberabad Police commissionerates; SP & DIG in CID; DIG Eluru Range & DIG ISW.

=== Telangana State ===
- 2014-2016: Allotted to Telangana state after formation of new state & continue in ISW as IG.
- July 2016 – 2022: Appointed as the first Commissioner of Police of Rachakonda, a newly formed police commissionerate in Telangana
- 2023-ADG CID then ADG Railway & Road safety
- 2024 Present: Serving as Additional Director General of Police for Law and order holding additional charge of Legal

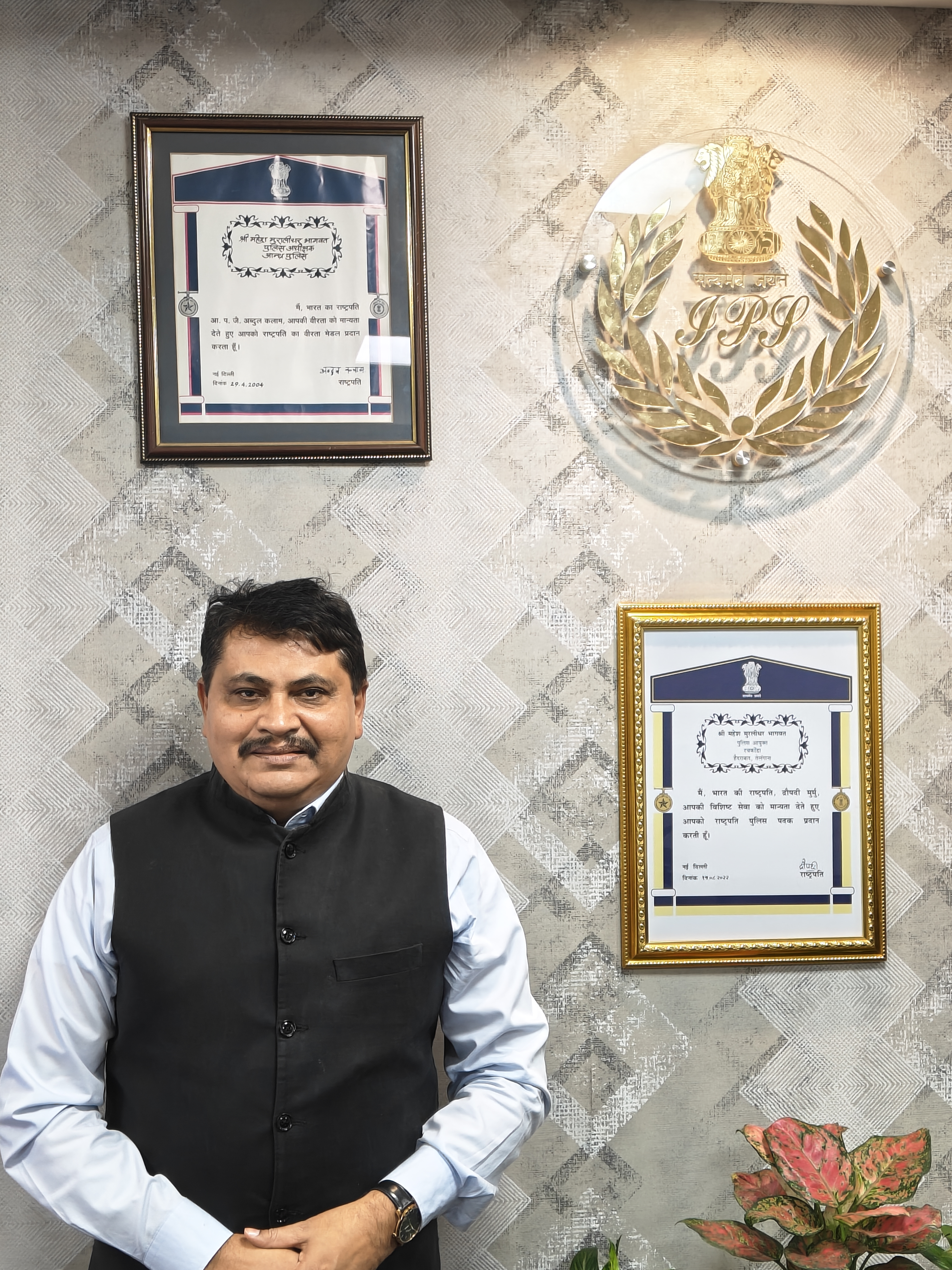
Mahesh Bhagwat, IPS officer from India, recipient of President's Medal

== Publications ==
Mahesh has contributed to eight books on trafficking published by the United Nations Office on Drugs and Crime (UNODC) and the Ministry of Home Affairs, India. One of his notable works, Synergy Between Stakeholders, is used as resource material for the anti-trafficking certificate diploma course at Indira Gandhi National Open University (IGNOU), Delhi.

== Recognition ==
=== Awards ===
Year	Award	Organization	Description	Reference
2004	Community Policing Award and Homeland Security Special Honour	International Association of Chiefs of Police (IACP), USA	For the community policing project "Police Mekosam" (Police for You) in Naxalite-affected Adilabad district	
2006	Weber Savvy Law Enforcement Award and Civil Rights Award	International Association of Chiefs of Police (IACP), USA	For the anti-trafficking project "Aasara" in Nalgonda District, focused on rescuing and rehabilitating victims of traditional caste-based prostitution	
2017	Trafficking in Persons Report Hero Award	U.S. Department of State	Recognized for significant contributions to combating human trafficking	
2017	Recognition as Most Influential Leader in Top 100 Working for Anti-Trafficking	Assent Compliance, Canada	Recognized for leadership in anti-trafficking efforts	
2018	Civil and Human Rights Award	International Association of Chiefs of Police (IACP), USA	For the worksite school project for child laborers rescued from brick kilns in Odisha	
2022	Smart Policing Award	Federation of Indian Chambers of Commerce & Industry (FICCI)	For the worksite school project	
