= Police ranks and insignia of India =

List of police ranks in India

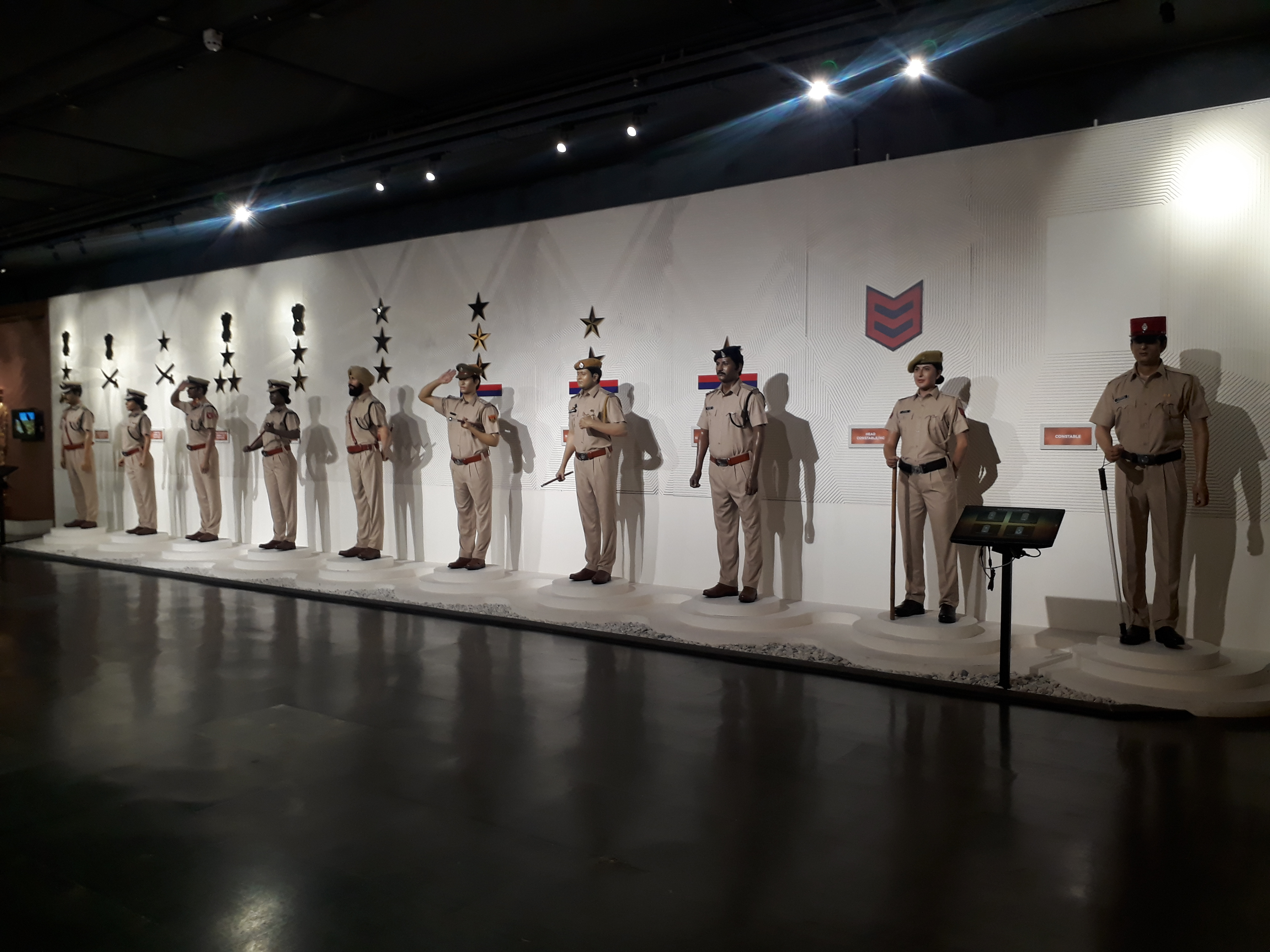
A display of the various ranks of the Indian police and their respective uniform at the National Police Memorial and Museum in New Delhi.

Police services in India comprise the Indian Police Service (IPS), DANIPS, and Pondicherry Police Service recruited by the central government, along with various State Police Services (SPS) recruited by state governments. As policing is a state subject, the structure and organisation of police forces vary across states. In most state police forces, ranks below Deputy Superintendent of Police (DSP) are considered subordinates, while DSP and above are supervisory ranks. These officers are organised in a structured hierarchical order.

== Ranks of law enforcement in India ==
The ranks, posts, and designations of all police officers vary from state to state as police and law and order are a state matter. But, generally the following pattern is observed:

Gazetted officers

Indian Police Service cadre officers rank insignia
Insignia
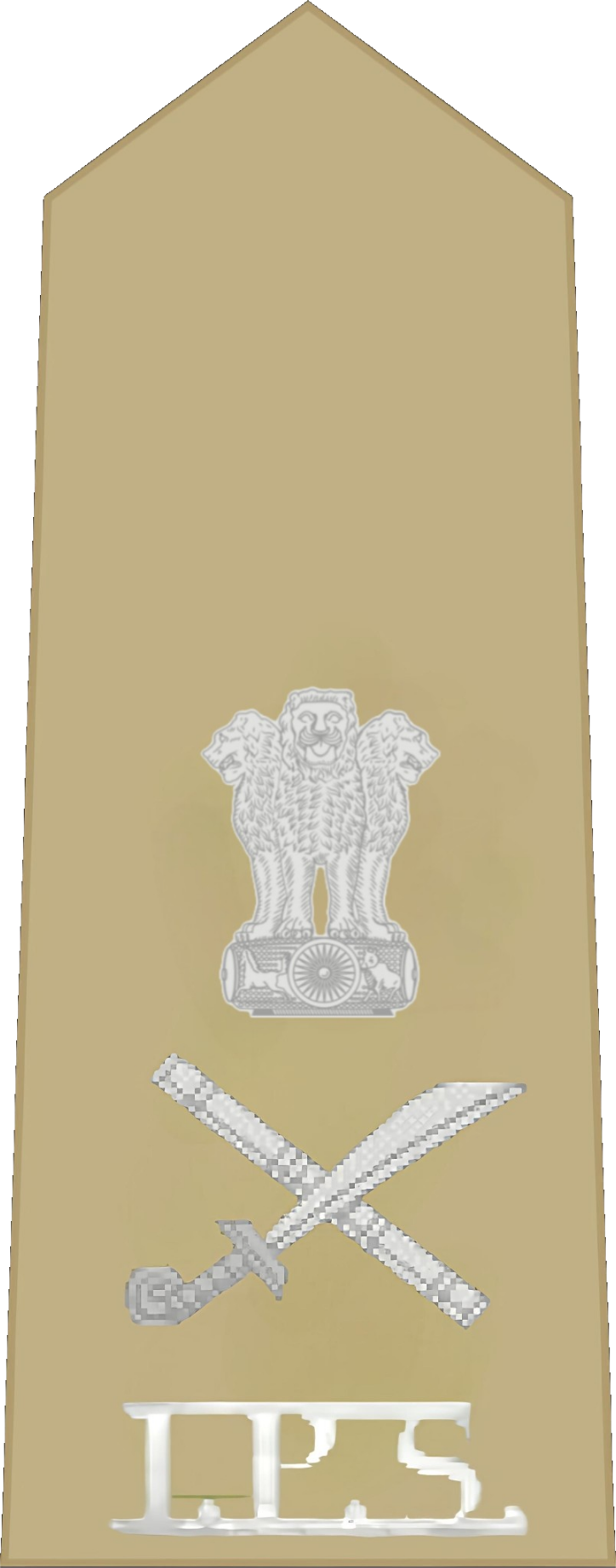
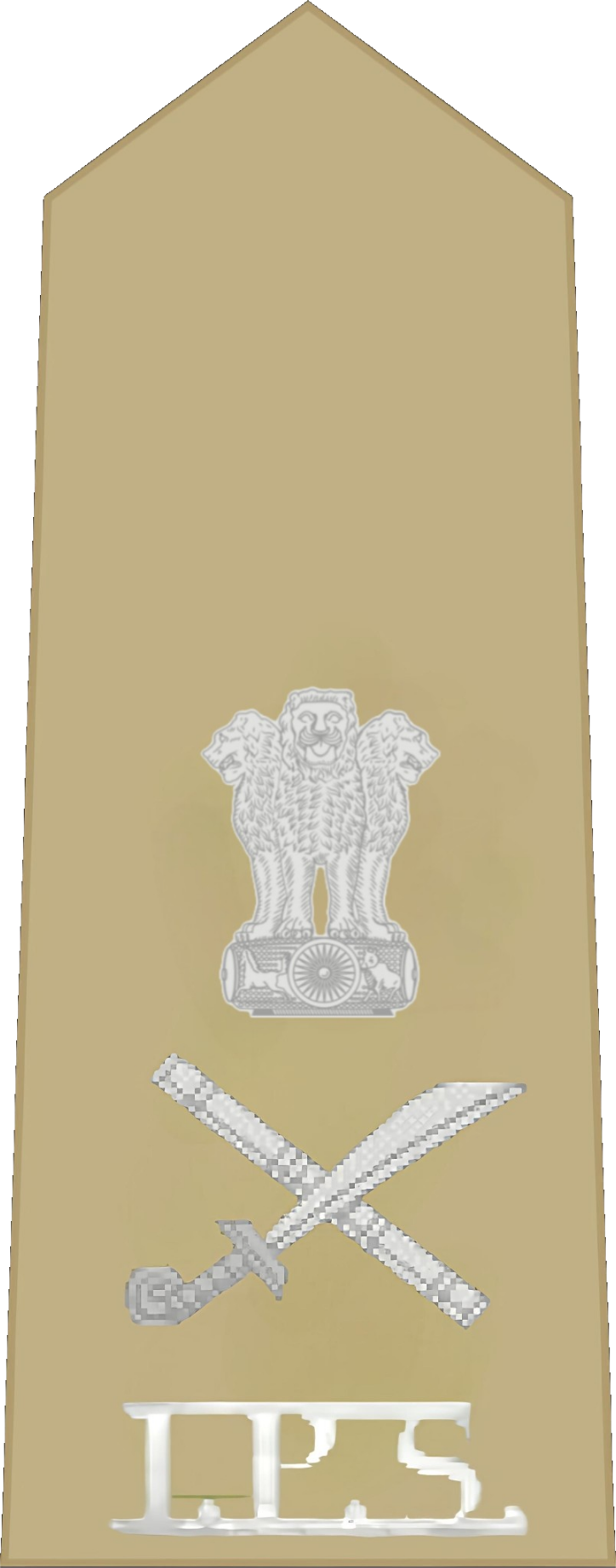
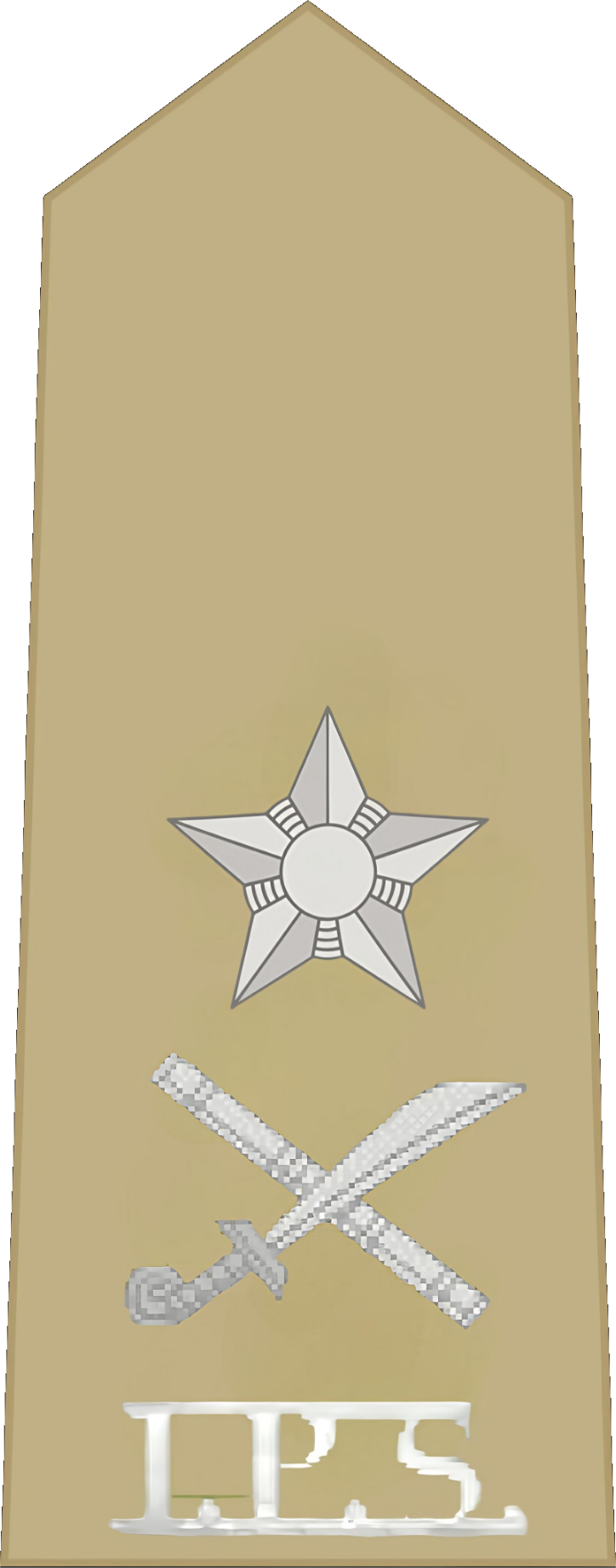
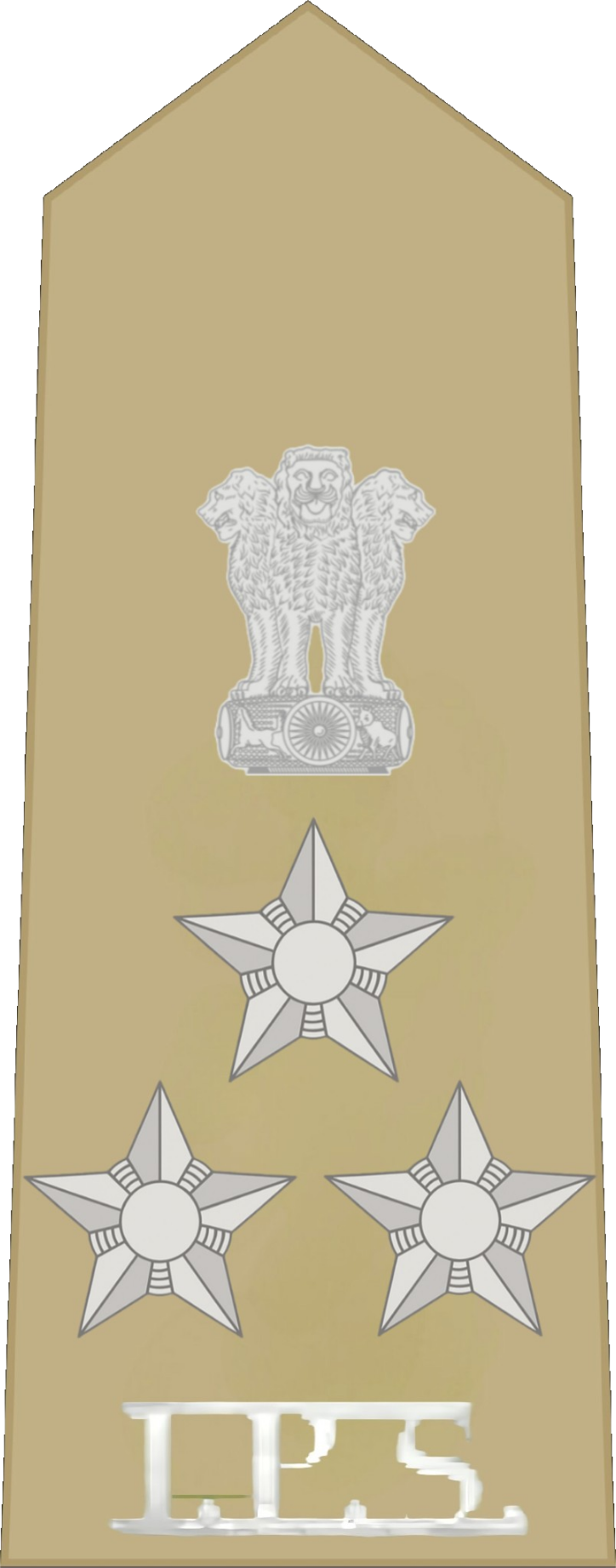
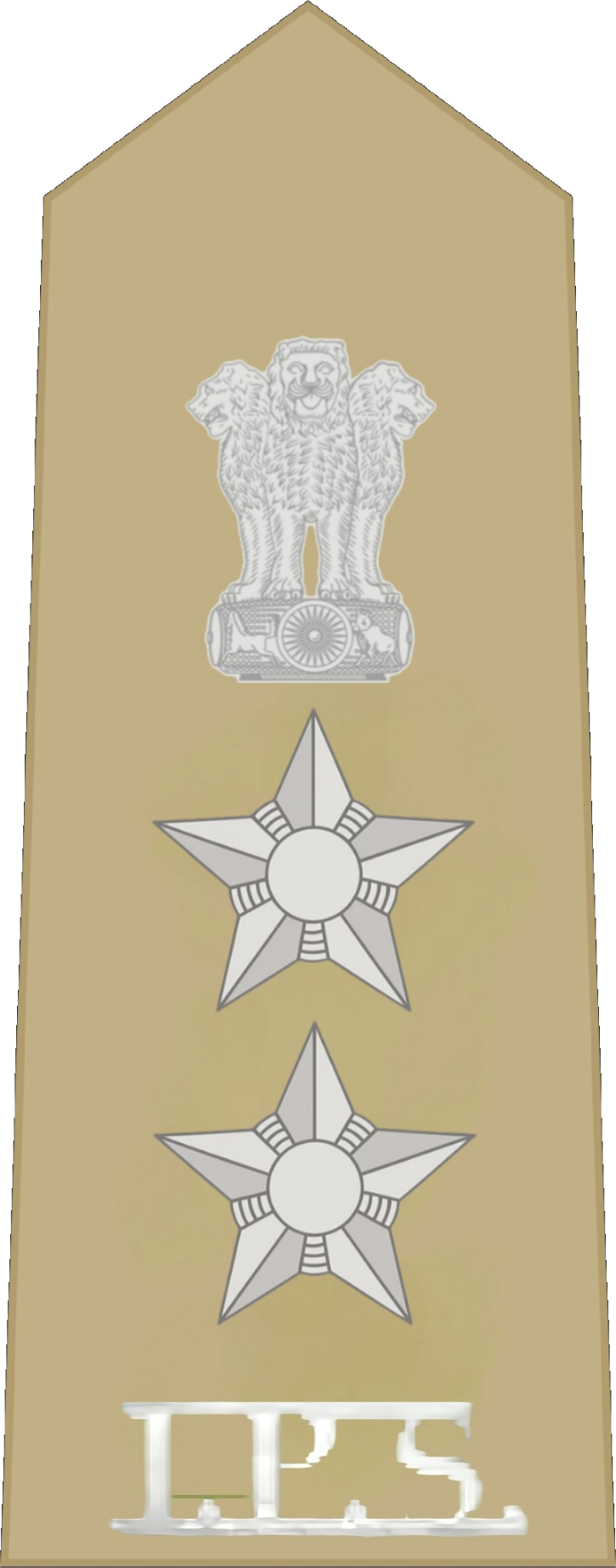
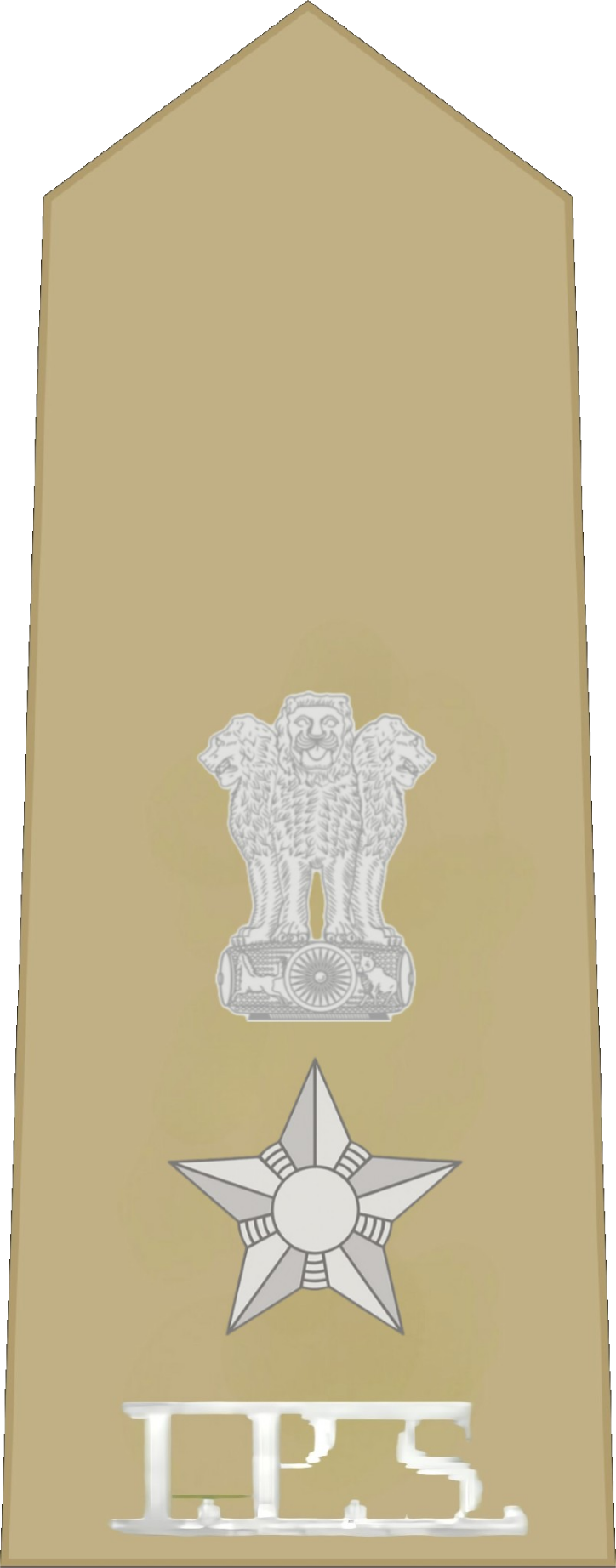
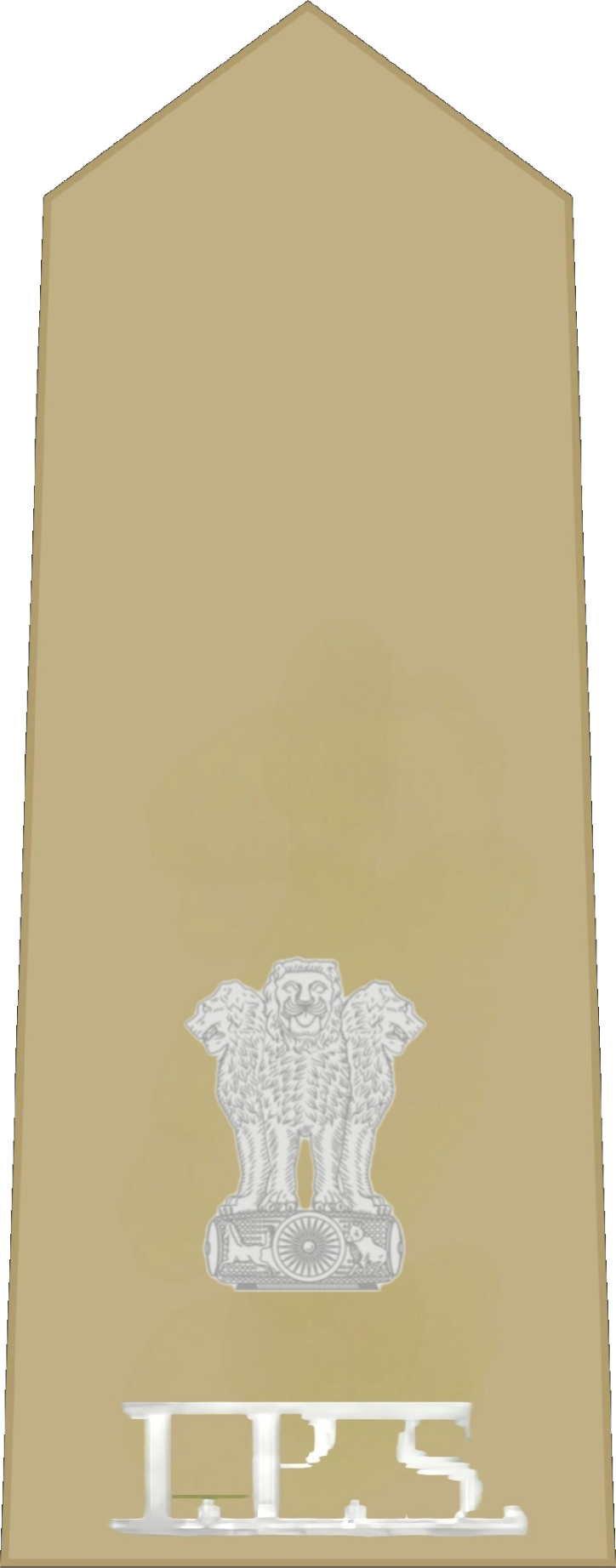
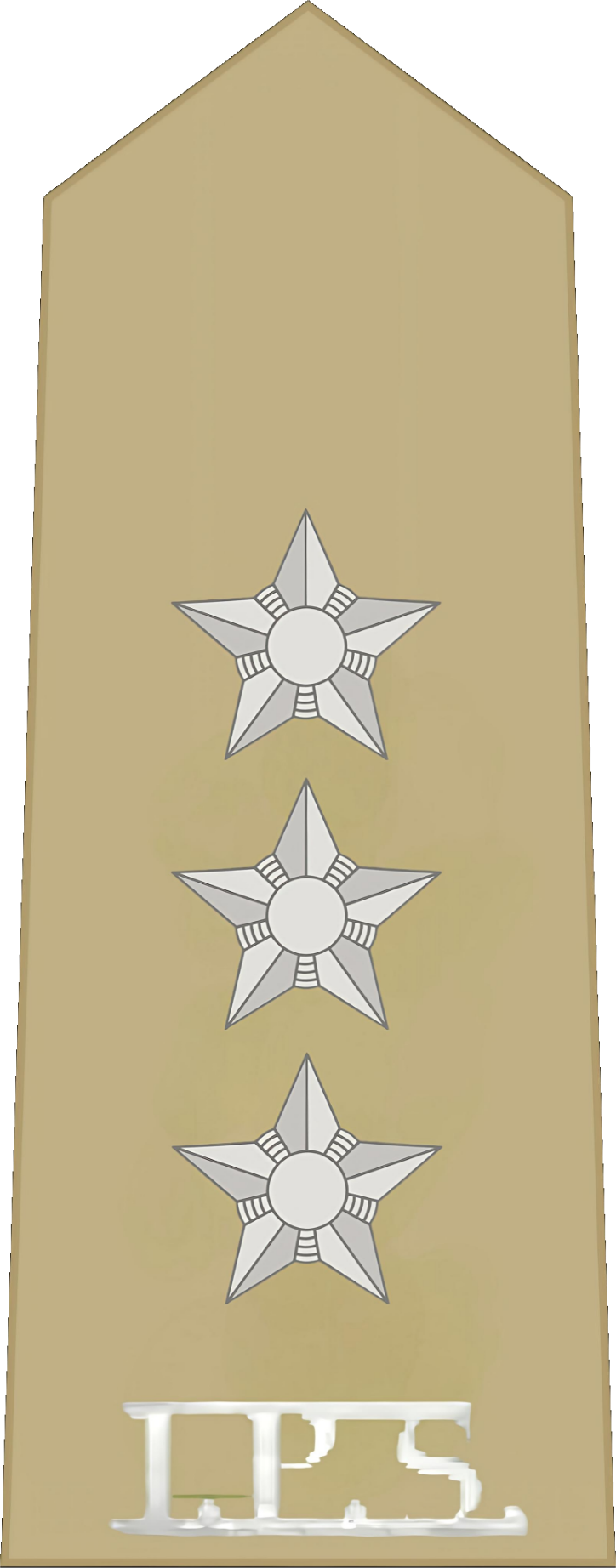
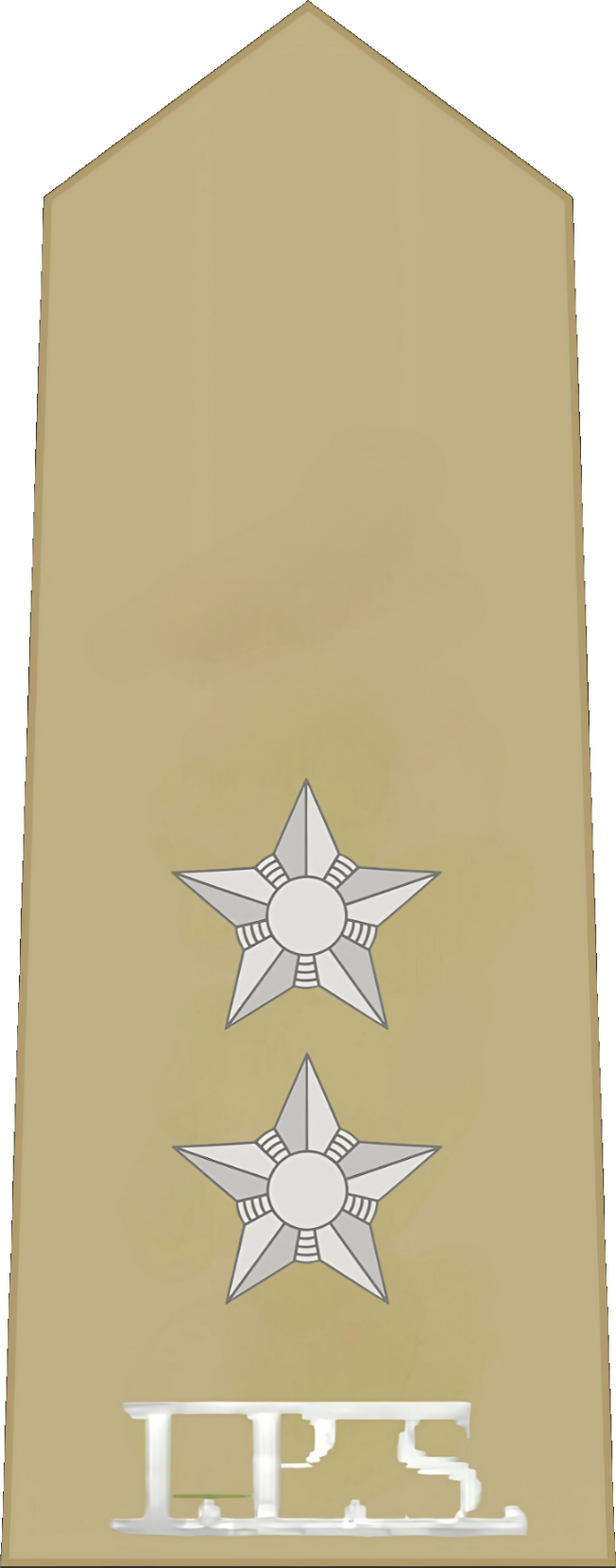
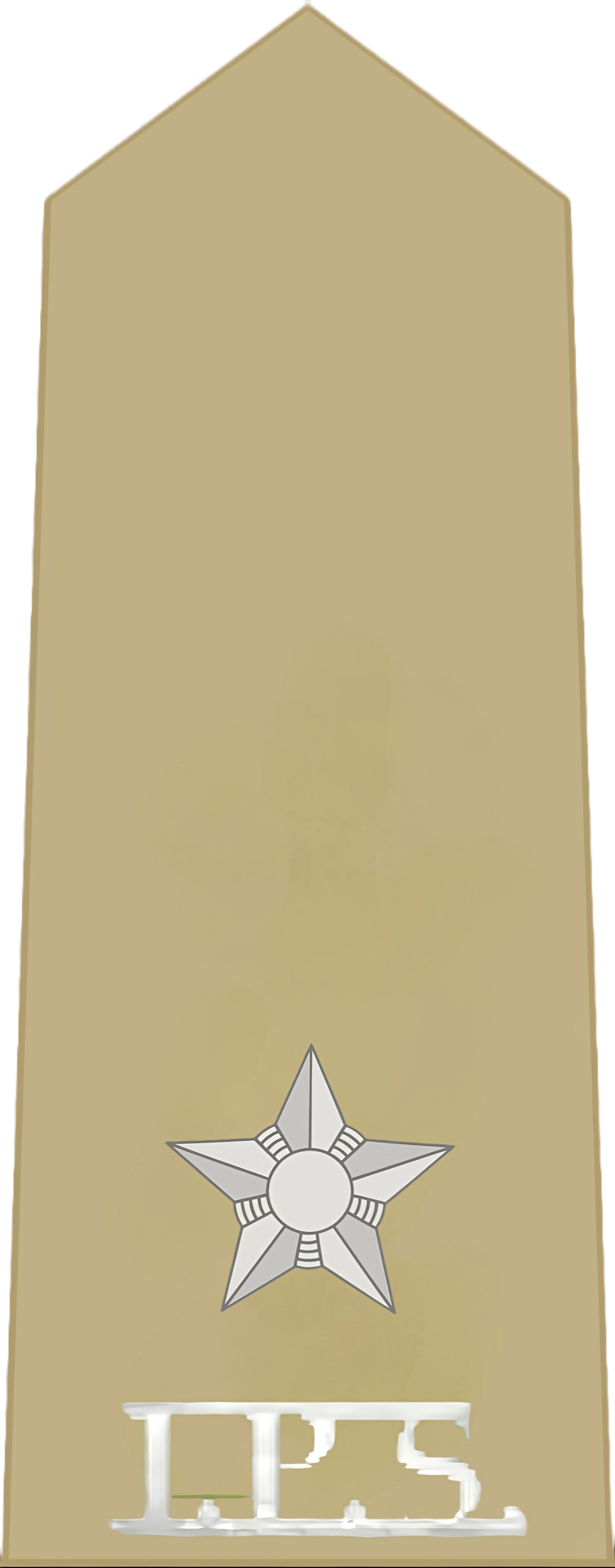
Rank
Director General of Police
Additional Director General of Police (Note: Rank insignia of DGP is similar to Additional DGP.)
Inspector General of Police
Deputy Inspector General of Police
Superintendent of Police (Selection Grade) (Note: The Senior Superintendent of Police (SSP) is a post, not a rank, typically held by an SP (selection grade or junior grade) in states like Uttar Pradesh, Jammu and Kashmir, and Punjab.)
Superintendent of Police
Additional superintendent of police
Assistant Superintendent of Police
Assistant superintendent of police (Probationary for two years)
Assistant Superintendent of Police (Probationary for one year)
Abbreviation
DGP
ADGP
IGP
DIGP
SP (SG)
SP
Addl.SP
ASP
ASP
ASP

- Note 1: The rank insignia of DGP, Spl.DGP, Addl.DGP is the same.
- Note 2: The equivalent rank to the ASP (Asst.SP) in State Police Services is the deputy superintendent of police (DSP/DySP).
- Note 3: The commissioner of police is a post typically held by DIG and above rank officers.

State Police Services rank insignia
Insignia

Rank

Superintendent of police (Note: In an armed police battalion, the equivalent rank is "Commandant.)
Additional superintendent of police (Note: In an armed police battalion, the equivalent rank is Deputy Commandant)
Deputy superintendent of police (Note: In an armed police battalion, the equivalent rank is Assistant Commandant.)

Abbreviation

SP
Addl.SP
DSP/Dy.SP

- Note: Gazetted officers in State Police Services (SPS) begins from DSP and above.
- In the Indian Police Service (IPS), rank starts from Assistant Superintendent of Police (ASP), which is equivalent to DSP in state services.

Indian Police non-gazetted officers rank insignia
Insignia
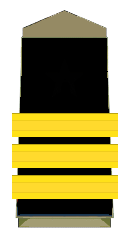
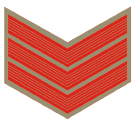
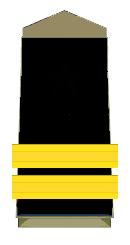
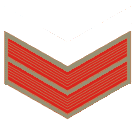
No insignia
Rank
Inspector of Police
Inspector / Circle Inspector (Note: Inspector or Circle Inspector with One Five-Pointed Star insignia exists in West Bengal Police.)
Assistant Police Inspector (Note: This rank exists only in the Maharashtra Police.)
Sub-Inspector
Sergeant (Kolkata Police)
Assistant Sub-Inspector
Head Constable (Note: Shoulder insignia rank only used in the Maharashtra Police.)
Senior Constable (Note: This rank is also known as senior constable, constable grade-I, and exists only in some state police forces.)
Police constable
Abbreviation
INSP
INSP / CO
API
SI
Sgt
ASI
HC
SC
PC

- The rank of Sergeant is used in India only in the Bihar Police and the Kolkata Police
- The One Five Pointed Star for the rank of Inspector is used by Police forces of 7 states viz. West Bengal, Jharkhand, Bihar, Sikkim, Assam, Nagaland and Tripura. This is because Inspectors of Police in these 7 states are Gazetted Officers. However, the Kolkata Police uses the Four Pointed Star of the Order of Bath for the ranks of Inspector and Assistant Commissioner of Police instead of Five Pointed Star. For the ranks of ASI, SI/Sergeant and Deputy Commissioner of Police, the usual Five Pointed Star is used
- Colour pattern and size of chevrons may vary according to the different rules of several distinct Indian State Police services.

=== State/UT Armed Police Cadre ===
- Leadership positions of State Armed Police are typically held by officers from the Indian Police Service (IPS) cadre. Their hierarchy includes DIG, IGP, ADGP, and DGP – same as in civil police
- Rank titles and designations vary across Indian states. The rank of '''Lance Naik''' is **not present in all states** and may be found only in select armed battalions or paramilitary-pattern forces.

State Armed Police Cadre Rank Structure
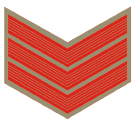
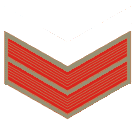
Gazetted Officers
Commandant	Deputy Commandant / Second-In Command	Assistant Commandant / Company Commander
Equivalent: Superintendent of Police	Equivalent: Additional superintendent of police	Equivalent: Deputy superintendent of police
Non-Gazetted Officers (NCOs) and Enlisted Ranks
					No Insignia
Inspector (Armed) / Platoon Commander	Sub-Inspector (Armed) / Section Commander	Assistant Sub-Inspector (Armed)	Head Constable / Havildar	Lance Naik/Naik (Intermediate rank)	Armed Police Constable/Rifleman
Equivalent: Inspector	Equivalent: Sub-Inspector	Equivalent: Assistant sub-Inspector	Equivalent: Head constable	Equivalent: None (intermediate post; varies by state)	Constable

== Organisational structure and roles ==
=== Overview ===
Law enforcement in India is a state subject, and police organisation varies across states, though a general structure is followed nationwide.

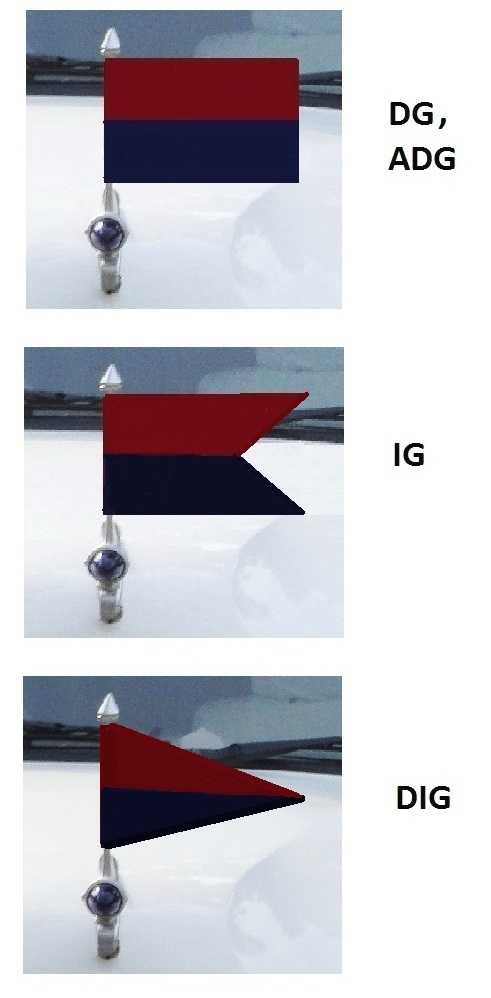
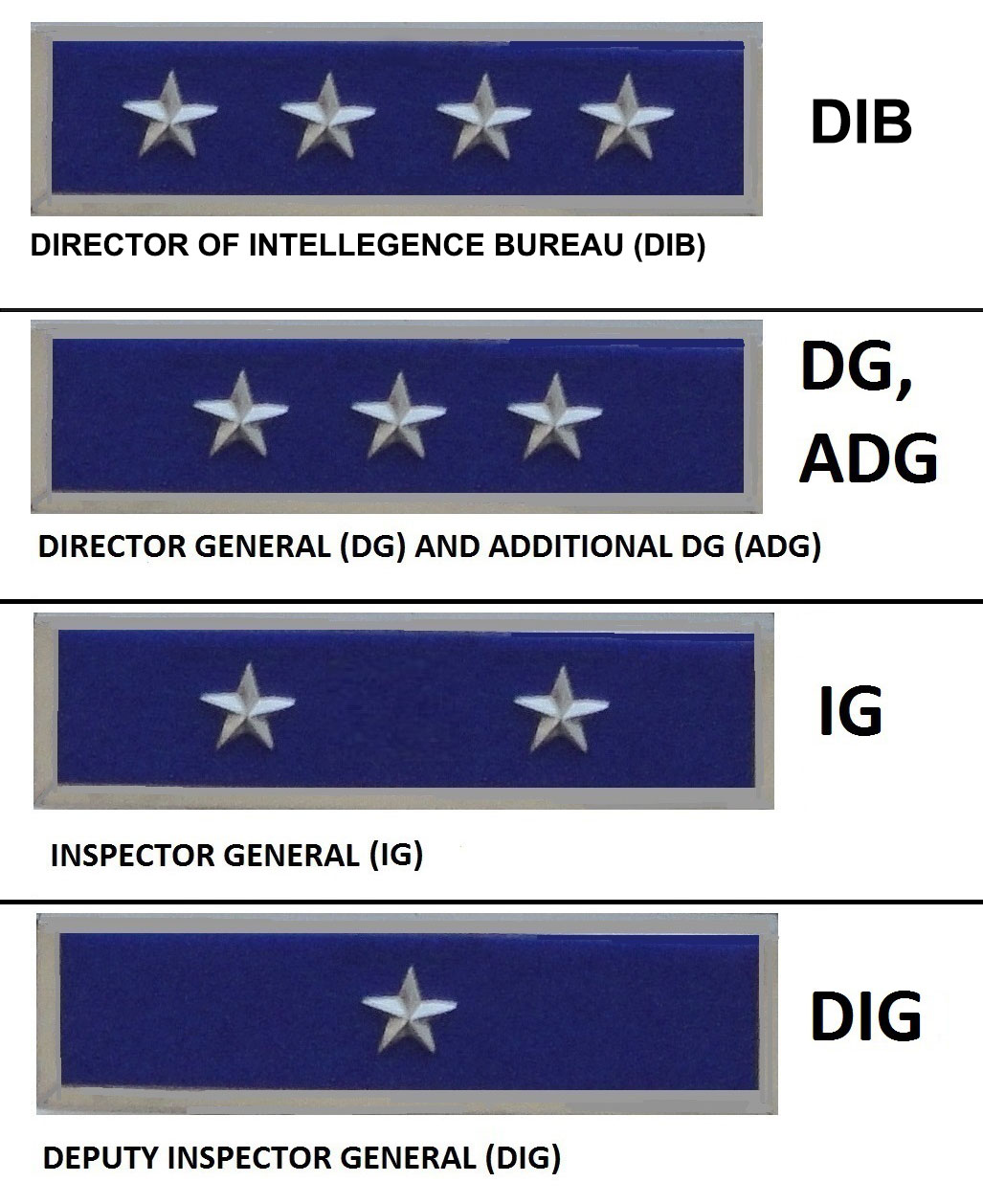
Flags and stars on official cars of senior IPS officers.

The Union Ministry of Home Affairs oversees internal security and border management in India and acts as the cadre-controlling authority of the Indian Police Service (IPS). The Ministry is administratively headed by the Home Secretary, a senior IAS officer. IPS officers are recruited either through the national Civil Services Examination or by promotion from State Police Services after state-level selection. The Indian Police Service cadre officers provide leadership to law enforcement and security agencies at both state and federal levels.
Each state’s Home Department is responsible for maintaining law and order, internal security, police administration, prosecution, prisons, and the administration of fire and rescue services. The department is headed politically by the Home Minister and administratively by an Additional Chief Secretary or Principal Secretary to the Government, who oversees its overall policy and administration. It also supervises the state police, prisons, prosecution services, criminal investigation, and other related agencies.

=== State police structure ===
Every state police force is headed by a Director General of Police (DGP), assisted by Special or Additional Directors General of Police (ADGPs) for key divisions like Law & Order, Crimes, Intelligence, Training, Administration, etc. Large forces are divided into police zones, ranges, and districts, while metropolitan areas function under the Commissionerate system. Commissionerates are led by a Commissioner of Police (CP), assisted by Joint and Deputy Commissioners. In larger metropolitan areas, the Commissioner is a higher-ranked IPS officer. A Commissioner of Police is typically an officer of the rank of Deputy Inspector General or above; the exact rank is determined by the state government based on requirements. In non-metropolitan areas, the district police system, headed by the District Superintendent of Police (SP), operates in coordination with the district administration, particularly the District Magistrate.

Outside commissionerates, the hierarchy generally follows:

- Law & Order command: Additional Director General (ADGP)
- Zone: ADG/IGP
- Range: IGP/DIG
- District: SSP/SP
- Subdivision: Dy.SP/Asst.SP (SDPO or Circle Officer)
- Police Station: Inspector or Sub-Inspector (SHO)

In some states, police circles exist between subdivisions and police stations, headed by an Inspector designated as a Circle Inspector (CI). A Circle Inspector supervises multiple police stations within the circle, and multiple police circles together constitute a police subdivision, which is headed by a Deputy Superintendent of Police (Dy.SP) or Assistant Commissioner of Police. The police circle system is commonly found in rural areas, where a police station is headed by a Sub-Inspector designated as the Station House Officer (SHO). Police stations within the circle are supervised by a Circle Inspector. A police station is the basic law enforcement unit of the state police, responsible for law and order, crime prevention and investigation, patrolling and traffic management. It is headed by a Station House Officer (SHO), usually of the rank of Inspector in urban areas or Sub-Inspector in other areas, and is staffed by Sub-Inspectors, Assistant Sub-Inspectors, Head Constables and Constables.

== See also ==
- Indian Army ranks and insignia
- Indian Air Force ranks and insignia
- Indian Navy ranks and insignia
- Indian Coast Guard ranks and insignia
- Border Roads Organisation ranks and insignia of India
