= Madhya Pradesh Police =

State police force in India

Madhya Pradesh Police Department (मध्य प्रदेश पुलिस विभाग)
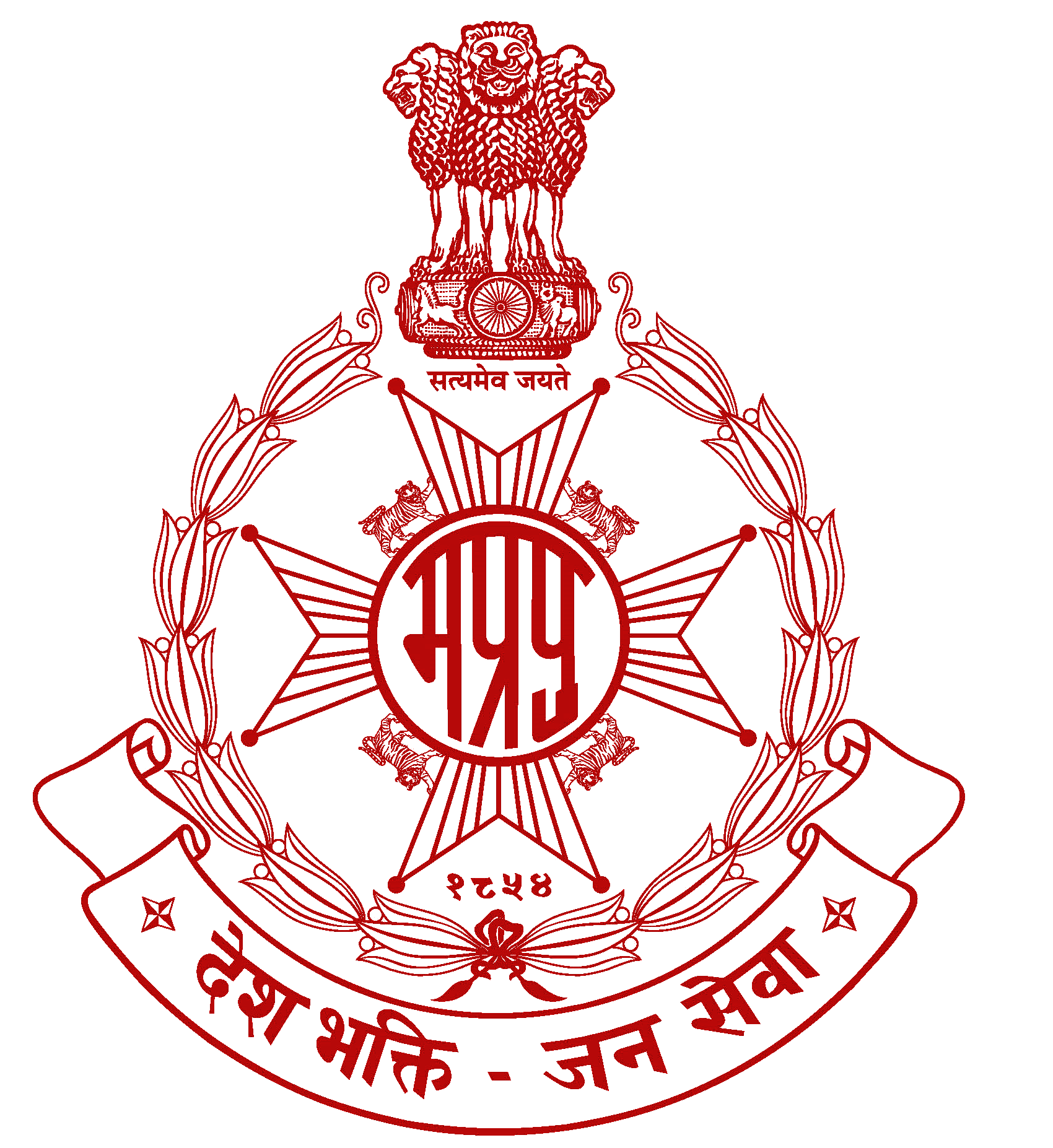
- MP Police official Logo

- Flag of the MP Police Department
- Common name: MP POLICE
- Abbreviation: MPP
- Motto: देश भक्ति ̶̵ जन सेवा (Desh Bhakti-Jan Seva)

Agency overview
- Formed: 1854
- Annual budget: ₹17,177 crore (US$1.8 billion) (2025–26 est.)
- Legal personality: Law and order Maintain

Jurisdictional structure
- Operations jurisdiction: Madhya Pradesh, IN
- Map of Madhya Pradesh Police Department's jurisdiction
- Area: Madhya Pradesh
- Population: 7,26,26,809
- Legal jurisdiction: State of Madhya Pradesh
- Governing body: Home Department of Madhya Pradesh
- Constituting instrument: Police Act, 1861
- General nature: Local civilian police

Operational structure
- Overseen by: MP Police
- Headquarters: Bhopal, Madhya Pradesh
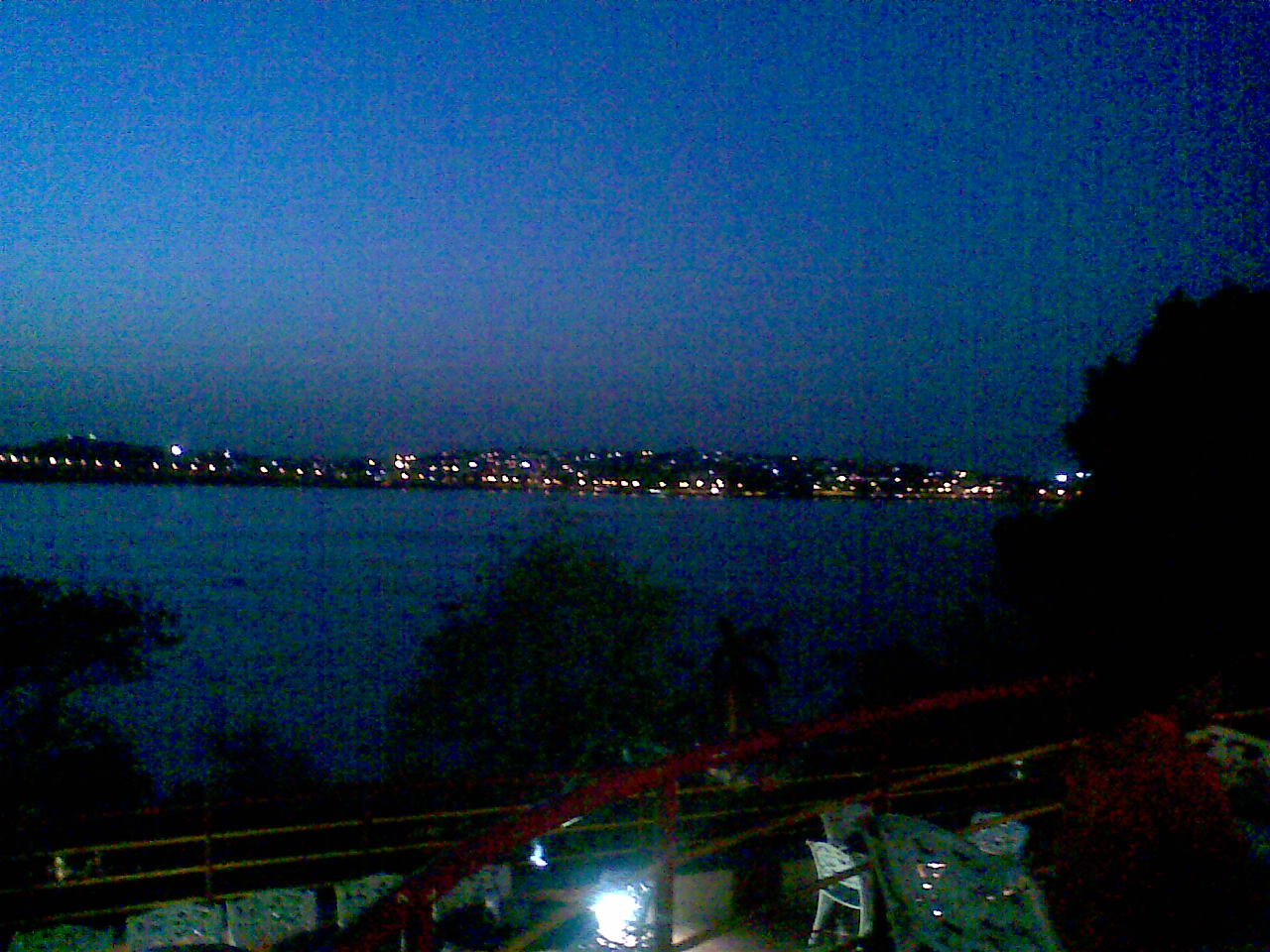
- Bhopal, Madhya Pradesh
- Gazetted Officers: 252 (Gazetted Officers)
- Non-Gazetted officers and Constables: 39785 (Non Gazetted Officers)
- Agency executive: Kailash Makwana (IPS), Director General of Police
- Parent agency: Home Department of Madhya Pradesh
- Child agency: MPSAF, MP CID, Cyber Cell, ATS
- Commands: Battalion
- Districts: Police Station

Facilities
- Offices: MP Districts
- Patrol Cars: Scorpio, Bolero
- Patrol crafts: 1
- Helicopters: 1
- Dog Squads: 52

Website
- www.mppolice.gov.in

The Madhya Pradesh Police (forrmerly Central Provinces Police) is the law enforcement agency for the state of Madhya Pradesh in India.

== Organizational structure ==
Madhya Pradesh Police is headed by the Director General of Police (DGP). The Director General of Police functions from the police headquarters in Bhopal. The DGP is assisted by a team of senior officers from the ranks of ADGP and IG of police to Assistant Inspector General of Police (AIG - a post equivalent in rank and status to the superintendent of police).

For the maintenance of law and order and to ensure efficient police administration, the state of Madhya Pradesh is divided into police zones, police ranges, and police districts. Each police district is headed by a Superintendent of Police (SP), who is an officer of the Indian Police Service (IPS). The District SP is assisted by Additional Superintendents of Police (Addl. SPs). Each police district is further divided into police subdivisions, which are headed by a Sub-Divisional Officer of Police (SDOP) or a City Superintendent of Police (CSP), both of whom hold the rank of Deputy Superintendent of Police (DSP). Within each subdivision, there are several police stations, each headed by an Inspector or Sub-Inspector designated as the Station House Officer (SHO).

=== Hierarchy ===
The Madhya Pradesh Police uses the following ranks:

Officers

- Director General of Police (DGP)
- Additional Director General of Police (ADGP)
- Inspector General of Police (IGP)
- Deputy Inspector General of Police (DIG)
- Senior Superintendent of Police (SSP)/Assistant Inspector General of Police (AIG)
- Superintendent of Police (SP)
- Additional Superintendent of Police (Addl. SP)
- Deputy SP or CSP (DSP)

Sub-ordinates

- Inspector of Police/Thana Incharge (TI)
- Subedar
- Sub-Inspector of Police (SI)
- Assistant Sub-Inspector of Police (ASI)
- Head Constable
- Constable

== Organizational structure ==
Madhya Pradesh Police is headed by Director General of Police. He is assisted by Additional Directors General of Police, who head various branches in Police Headquarters.

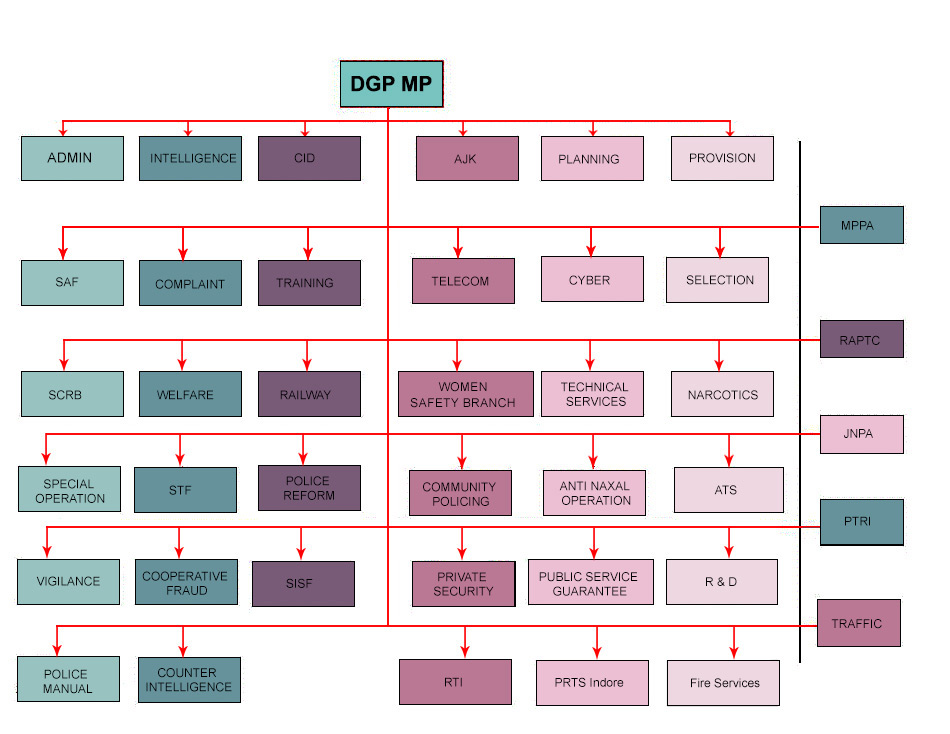

Indian Police Service cadre officers rank insignia
Insignia
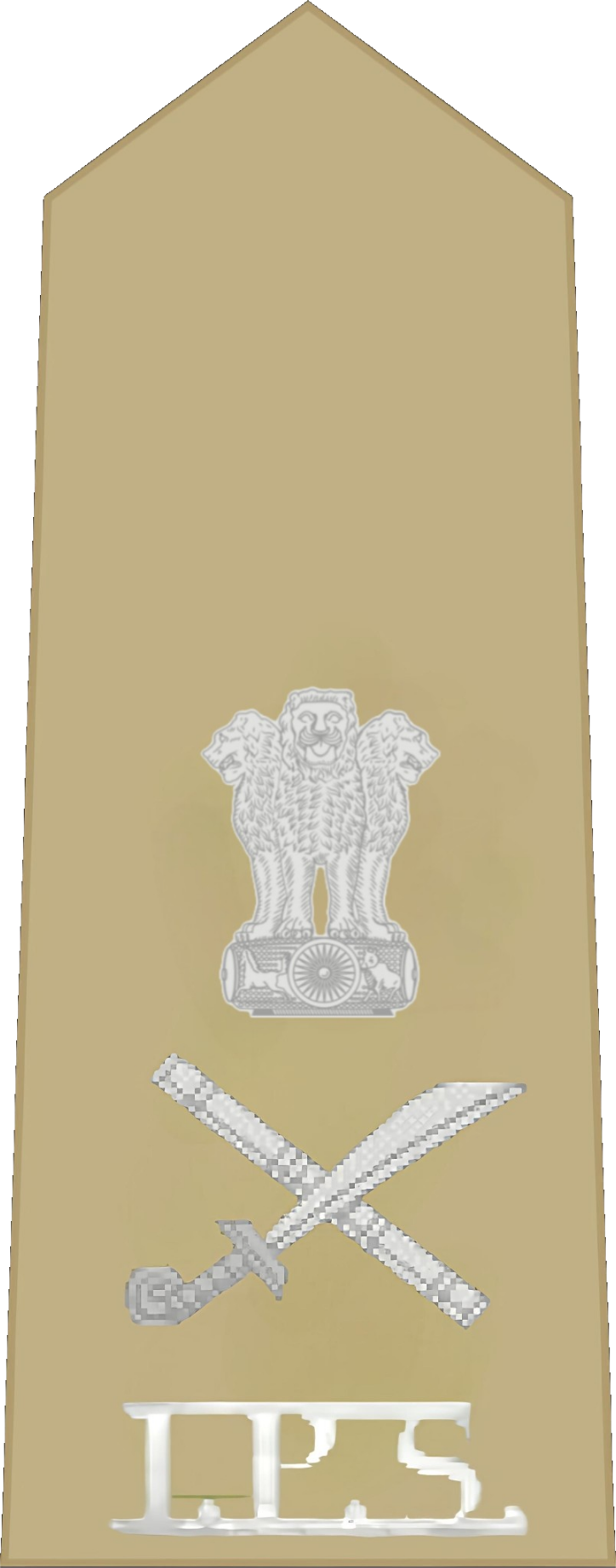
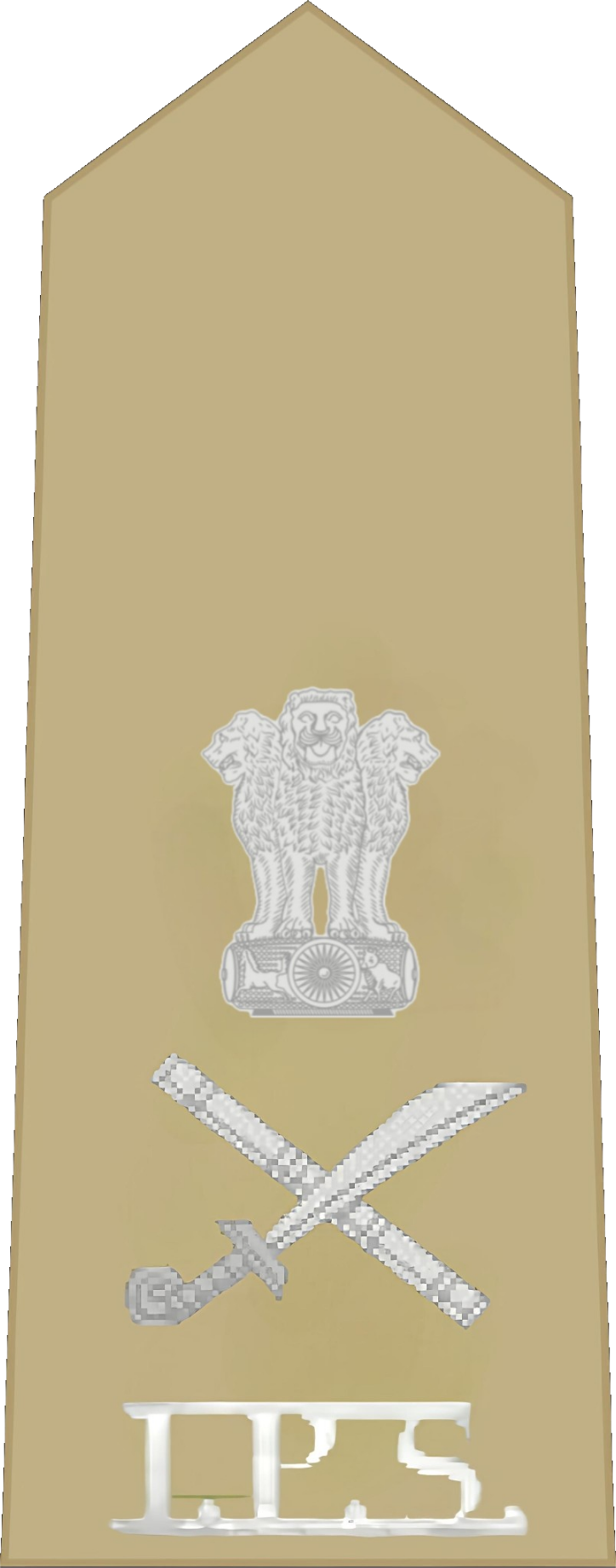
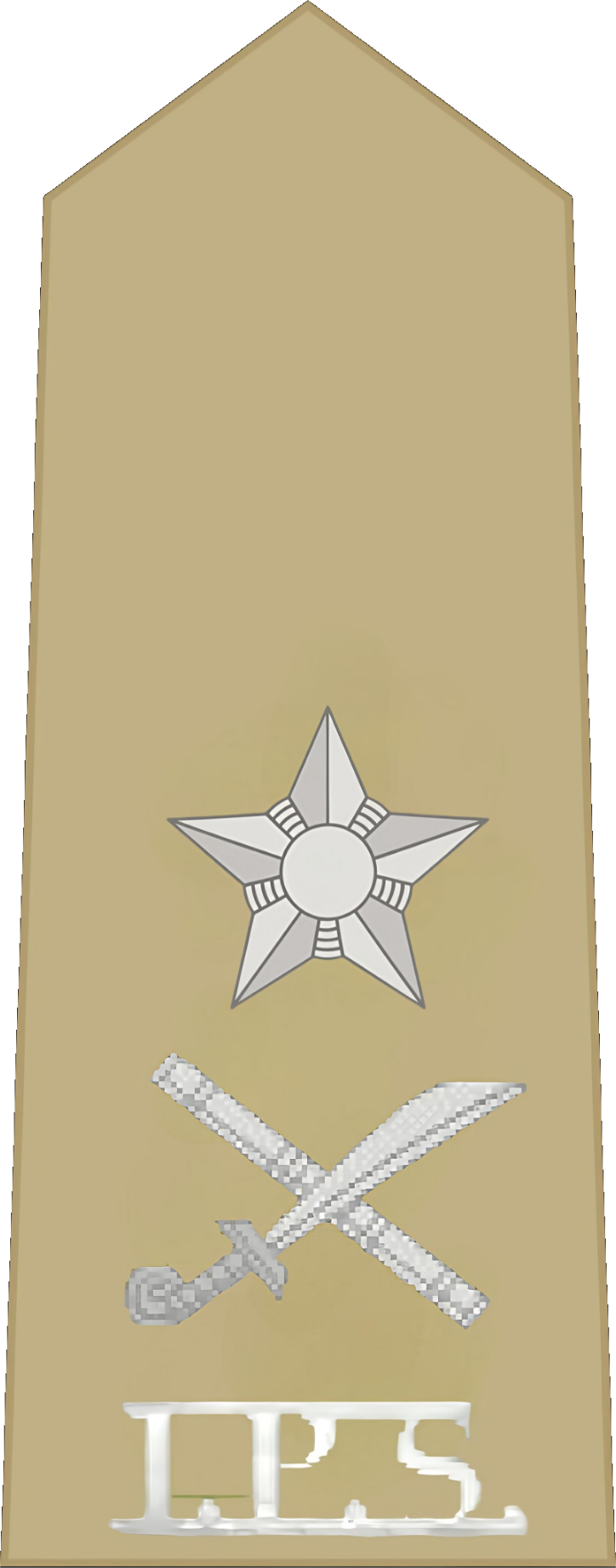
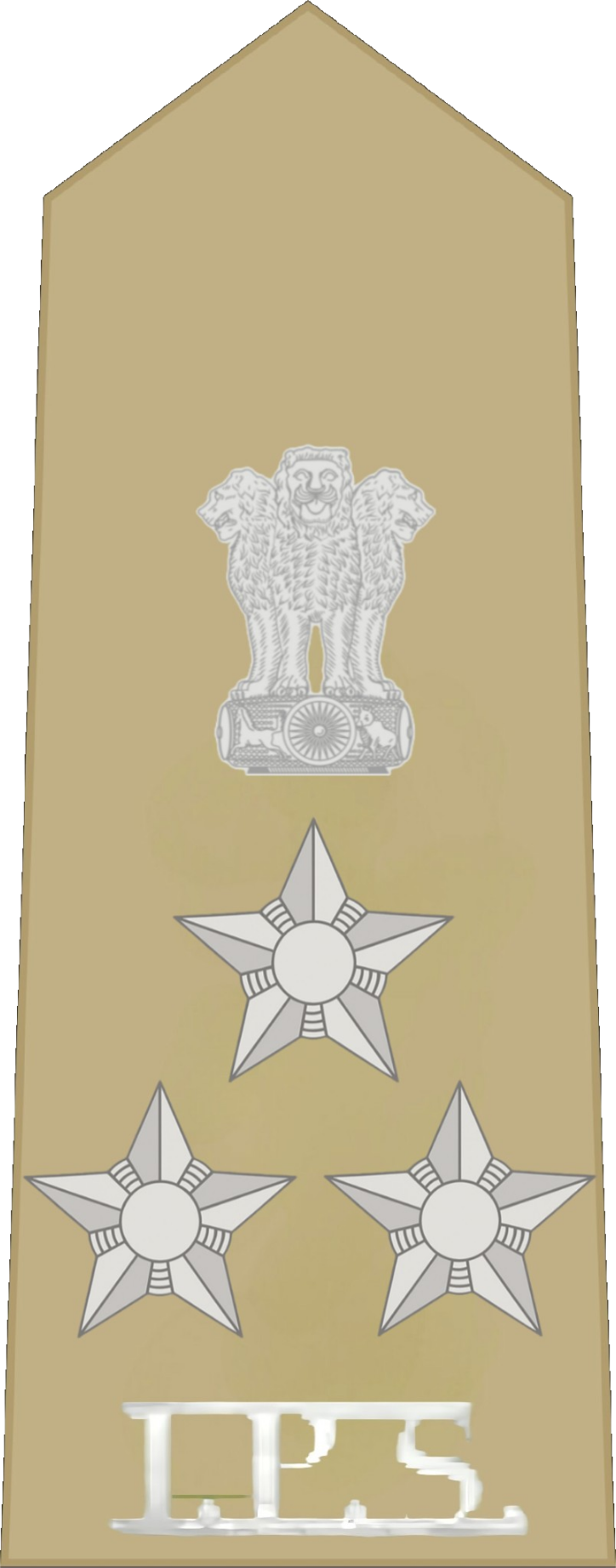
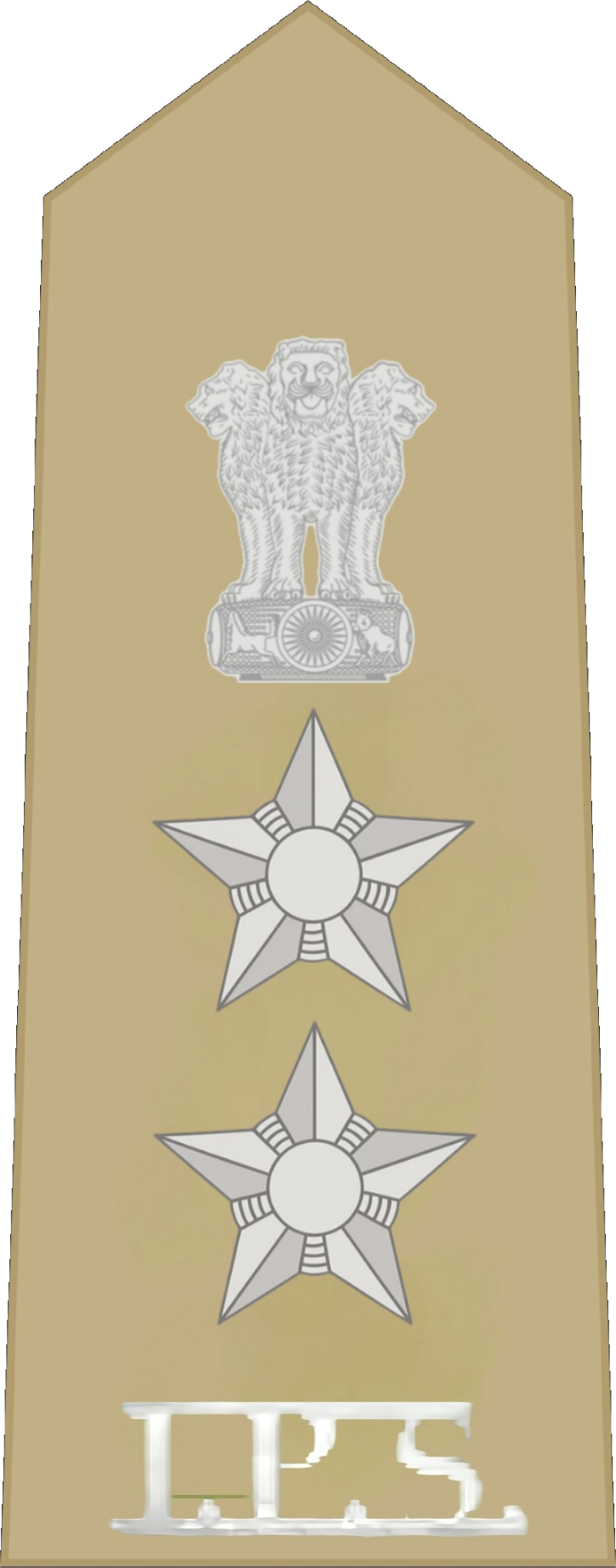
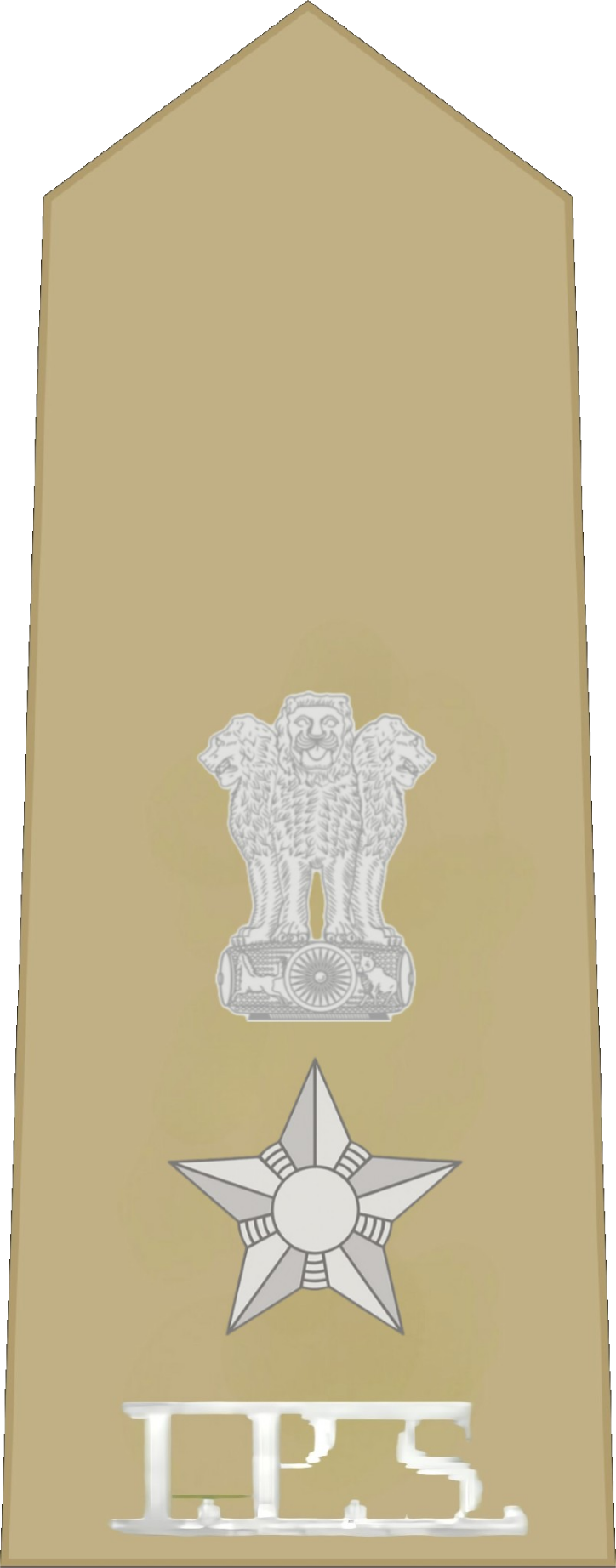
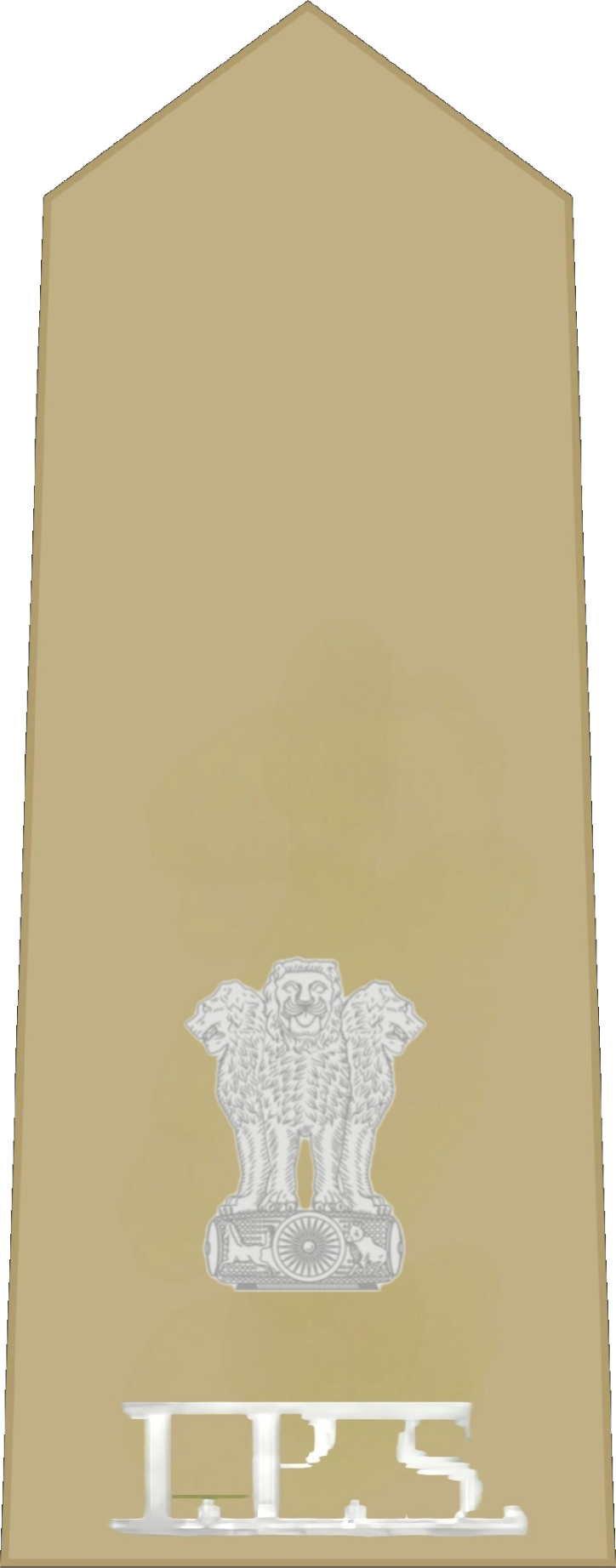
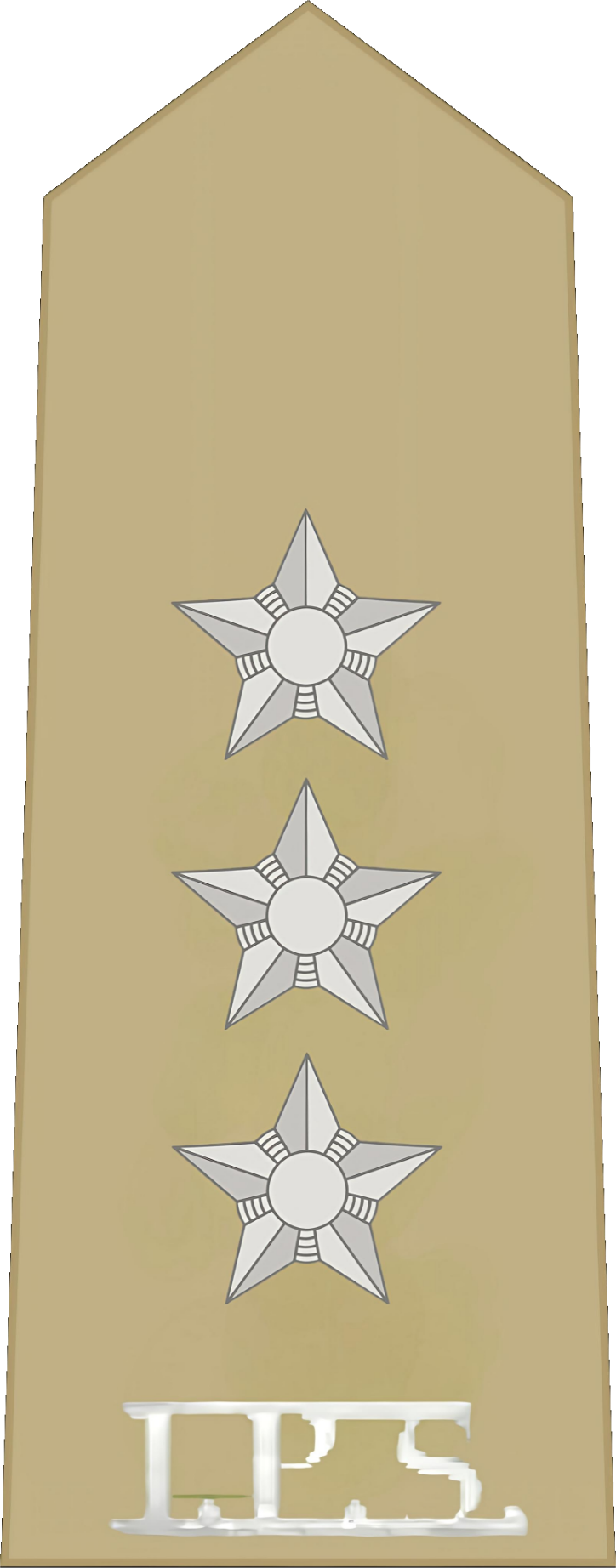
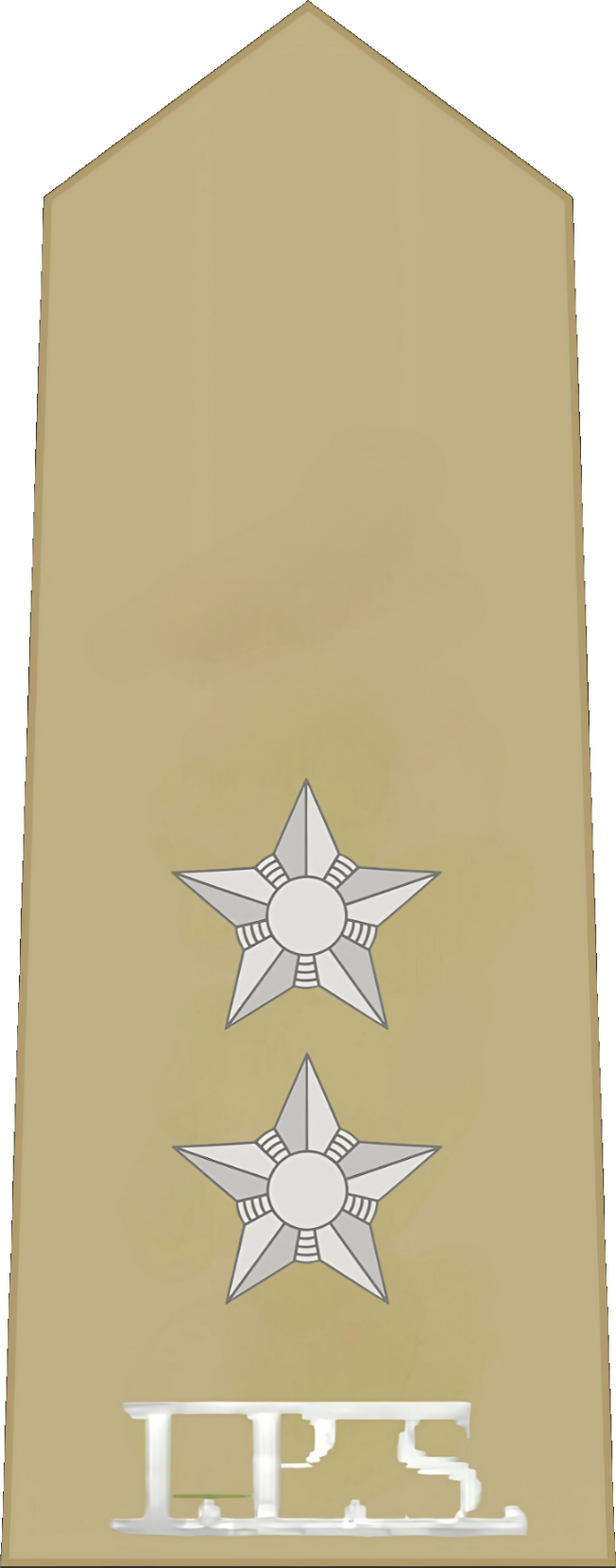
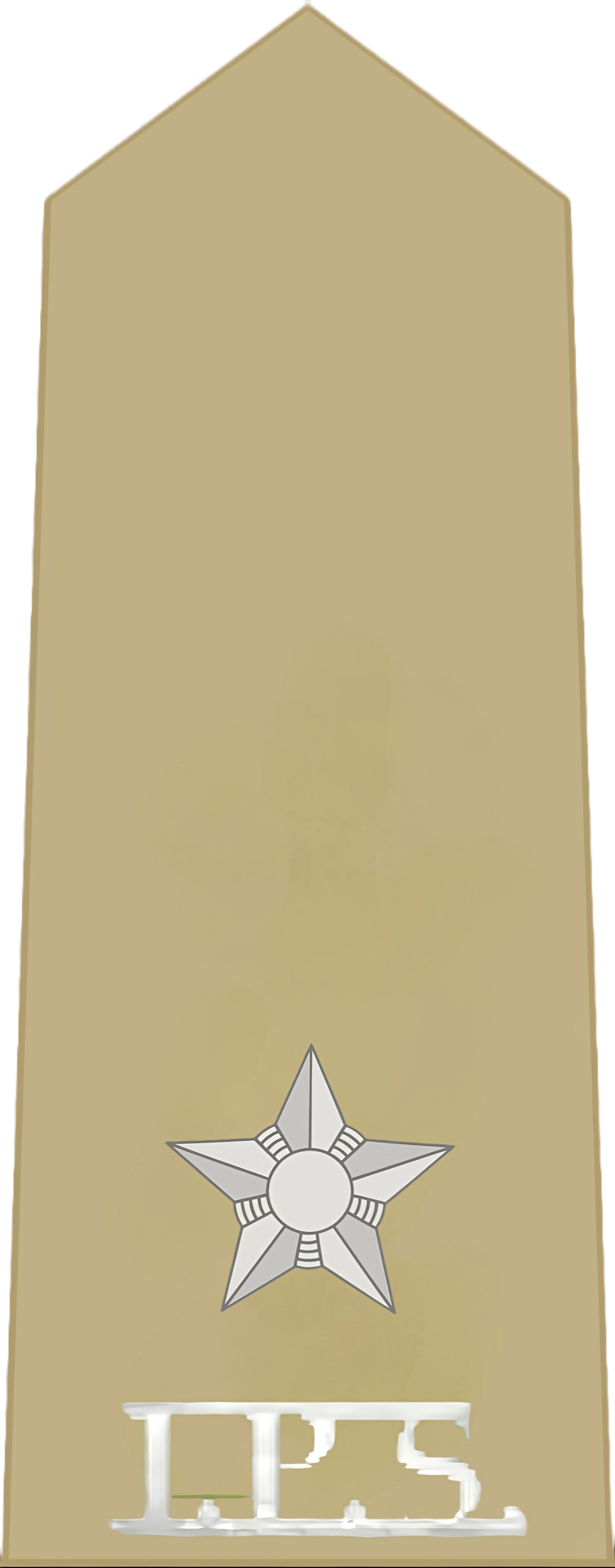
Rank
Director General of Police
Additional Director General of Police (Note: Rank insignia of DGP is similar to Additional DGP.)
Inspector General of Police
Deputy Inspector General of Police
Superintendent of Police (Selection Grade) (Note: The Senior Superintendent of Police (SSP) is a post, not a rank, typically held by an SP (selection grade or junior grade) in states like Uttar Pradesh, Jammu and Kashmir, and Punjab.)
Superintendent of Police
Additional superintendent of police
Assistant Superintendent of Police
Assistant superintendent of police (Probationary for two years)
Assistant Superintendent of Police (Probationary for one year)
Abbreviation
DGP
ADGP
IGP
DIGP
SP (SG)
SP
Addl.SP
ASP
ASP
ASP

- Note 1: The rank insignia of DGP, Spl.DGP, Addl.DGP is the same.
- Note 2: The equivalent rank to the ASP (Asst.SP) in State Police Services is the deputy superintendent of police (DSP/DySP).
- Note 3: The commissioner of police is a post typically held by DIG and above rank officers.

== Initiatives ==
- Black Ribbon Initiative- on 26 November 2013 ADGP Mr. Varun Kapoor of PRTS Indore launched an awareness and public outreach program] to make all sections of society computer security aware and alert. This is designed to protect the citizens from becoming victims of cyber offences and at the same time to prevent them from become offenders under the various sections of the Information Technology Act, 2000, by mistake or due to lack of knowledge. In last five years they have conducted more than 300 workshops across India. This initiative was spearheaded by IPS Mr.Varun Kapoor.
