= DANIPS =

Police service of Indian Union Territories

Delhi, Andaman and Nicobar Islands, Lakshadweep, Daman and Diu and Dadra and Nagar Haveli (Police) Services
Agency overview
- Formed: 1972; 54 years ago
- Preceding agency: Delhi, Himachal Pradesh, Andaman and Nicobar Islands Police Service (DHANI; 1967–1972)
- Jurisdiction: Union Territories
- Minister responsible: Amit Shah, Minister of Home Affairs
- Agency executive: T. V. Somanathan, Cabinet Secretary
- Parent department: Union Territories Division
- Parent agency: Ministry of Home Affairs

The Delhi, Andaman and Nicobar Islands, Lakshadweep, Daman and Diu and Dadra and Nagar Haveli (Police) Services, abbreviated as DANIPS, formerly called the Delhi, Andaman and Nicobar Islands Police Service, is the police service of the Union Territories of India. It is part of the Central Civil Services (CCS).

Candidates are recruited directly through the Civil Services Examination. The selected Group B officers are responsible for the law and order and policing functions of Delhi, Andaman and Nicobar Islands, Lakshadweep, and Dadra and Nagar Haveli and Daman and Diu. They form a feeder cadre of the Indian Police Service.

== Selection ==
DANIPS officers are recruited directly through the rigorous Civil Services Examination (CSE) conducted by Union Public Service Commission every year. Selected recruits are trained at Police Training College, Jharoda Kalan by the Delhi Police.

In DANIPS, two-thirds of the strength is directly recruited through CSE examination and the remaining are promoted from the non-gazetted officers of the Union Territories.

== Cadre ==
The Union Territories Division of the Ministry of Home Affairs is the cadre controlling authority for DANIPS. As of 2018, DANIPS comprised 510 personnel, with a sanctioned strength of 533.

== Positions ==
The Service includes four grades—Entry Grade (Group B), Selection Grade (Group A), Junior Administrative Grade-II (Group A), and Junior Administrative Grade-I (Group A). Officers in the Entry Grade undergo a two-year probation period. Entry and Selection Grade positions include Assistant Commissioner of Police (ACP) in Delhi and Deputy Superintendent of Police (DSP) in other Union Territories, while JAG I and II posts include Additional Deputy Commissioner of Police (Add. DCP) in Delhi and vice principal at the Police Training College. Promotions up to JAG-I follow a time-scale basis: Entry Grade officers with a minimum of eight years of service are promoted to Selection Grade, then requiring 13 years to reach JAG-II and 18 years for JAG-I.

| Grade | Delhi | Other UTs | Insignia |
|---|---|---|---|
| Junior Administrative Grade-I | Additional Deputy Commissioner of Police (Addl.DCP) | Additional Superintendent of Police (Addl. SP) | |
| Junior Administrative Grade-II | Additional Deputy Commissioner of Police (Addl.DCP) | Additional Superintendent of Police (Addl. SP) | |
| Selection Grade | Assistant Commissioner of Police (ACP) | Deputy Superintendent of Police (DySP) | |
| Entry Grade | Assistant Commissioner of Police (ACP) | Deputy Superintendent of Police (DySP) | |

Officers are posted in various wings (such as Crime & Traffic or others) or in a sub-division. In a sub-division, they are designated as Sub-Divisional Police Officers (SDPO). Both DSP and Add. SP rank officers can serve as SDPOs. DANIPS officers may also be promoted to the Indian Police Service (IPS), after which they can be appointed as Deputy Commissioner of Police (DCP) in Delhi. IPS officers in the UTs are placed in the Arunachal Pradesh-Goa-Mizoram and Union Territory (AGMUT) cadre.

== See also ==
- DANICS
- Indian Police Service
- State Police Services
