= Death of Twisha Sharma =

Ongoing criminal investigation in India

The Twisha Sharma case is an ongoing criminal investigation concerning the death of Twisha Sharma, ex Miss Pune, who was found dead at her matrimonial residence in Bhopal, Madhya Pradesh, on 12 May 2026. The case received national attention following allegations raised by members of Sharma's family and subsequent suo moto proceedings by the Supreme Court of India urging family members on both sides to make their statements before the investigating authorities rather than to the media.

== Background ==
On 12 May 2026, Sharma was found dead at her matrimonial residence in Bhopal. An investigation was initiated by the Madhya Pradesh Police. Following the incident, members of her family, including Major Harshit Sharma, cousin Naina Sharma and sister-in-law Captain Dr. Rashi Abrol and Rashi's father, alleged that she had been subjected to dowry related harassment by her husband, Samarth Singh and her mother-in-law, former district judge Giribala Singh. The family also raised concerns regarding the circumstances of her death and the conduct of the initial investigation, refusing to take the body for cremation with demands of second autopsy.

== Investigation ==
The investigation was initially conducted by the Madhya Pradesh Police before being transferred to the Central Bureau of Investigation (CBI).

The Chief Justice of Supreme Court expressed the need for suo moto cognizance due to media narrative created that a fair investigation was denied on the account of the involvement of the judiciary.

The court expressed concerns over family members crying and making allegations and statements before the media and restrained both sides of the family from making statements in public and media, urging them to get their version recorded before the probe agencies.

The court also asked media to avoid recording statements of persons who are likely to be potential witnesses/accused and unnecessarily prejudge outcome on certain issues which have to be probed. However, despite this direction, members of Twisha's family, her brother Major Harshit Sharma and his wife Captain Rashi Abrol, both members of the Indian Armed Forces, along with her cousin, made multiple media appearances asking to not drop the death from news cycle.

The family refused to cremate the body for 12 days until a second postmortem was performed by a team of doctors called from AIIMS Delhi. The final rites happened under media spotlight.

The CBI re-registered the case against advocate Samarth Singh and former district judge Giribala Singh and began examining forensic and digital evidence.

Samarth Singh was taken into custody on 22 May 2026 after appearing before a court in Jabalpur, while Giribala Singh was arrested by the CBI on 28 May 2026 after the Madhya Pradesh High Court set aside her anticipatory bail.

The CBI subsequently conducted crime-scene reconstruction exercises and continued its investigation.

As of June 2026, both accused were in judicial custody and the investigation remained ongoing.
