= Superintendent of police (India) =

Rank in Indian police forces

Superintendent of Police
- पुलिस अधीक्षक
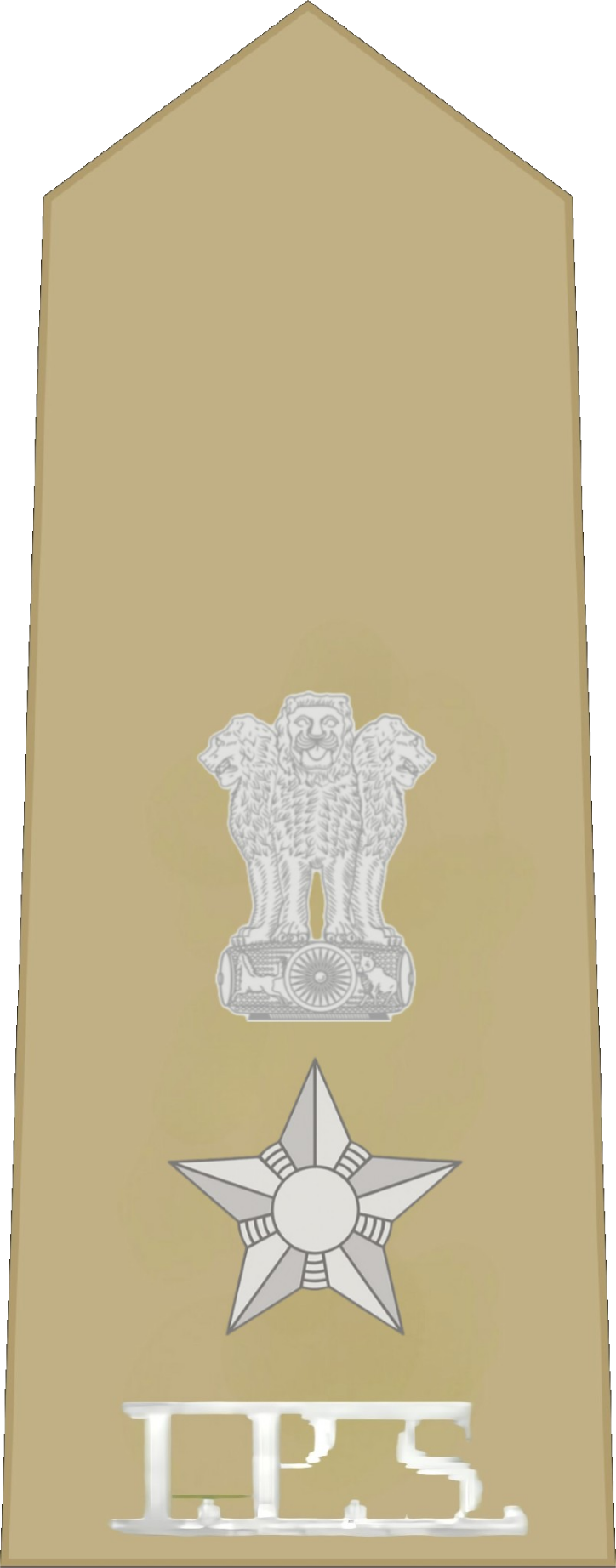
- Rank insignia of SP in junior administrative grade

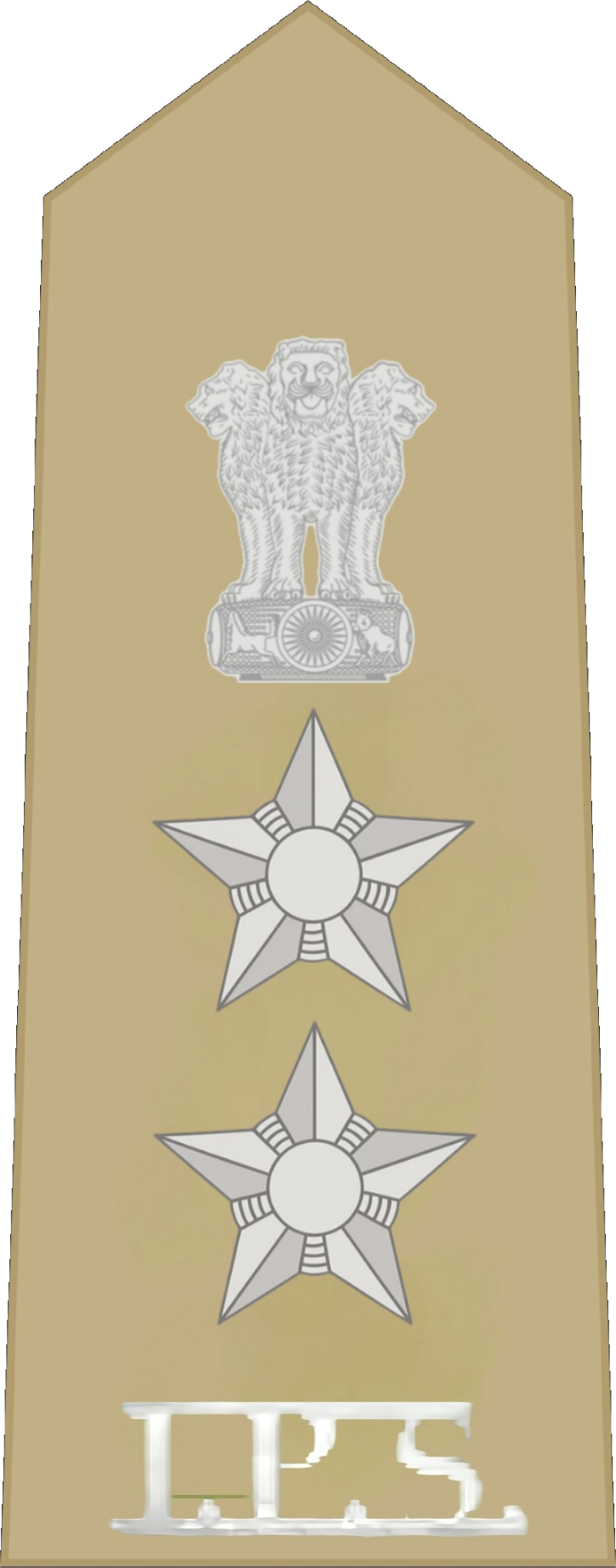
- Rank insignia of SP in selection grade

- Flag of India
- Type: Head of the police district
- Status: Active
- Abbreviation: SP
- Member of: Indian Police Service (IPS); State Police Services (SPS)
- Reports to: Deputy Inspector General of Police (where such a post exists)
- Seat: SP office
- Appointer: The President of India
- Constituting instrument: The Indian Police Act, 1861
- Formation: 1791 (235 years ago)
- Deputy: Additional Superintendent of Police; Assistant Superintendent of Police (IPS); Deputy Superintendent of Police (SPS)
- Salary: ₹78,800 and various other allowances and facilities

The Superintendent of Police (SP) is a rank in Indian police forces held by a career civil servant serving as the head of a police district. Officers of the same rank may also head specialised wings or units. In cities under commissionerate system, an SP may serve as the Deputy Commissioner of Police (DCP) under the Commissioner of Police. The SP coordinates with the district magistrate (collector), the administrative head of a revenue district, who has also the responsibility of law and order maintenance. Additionally, the SP sends monthly reports to the Director General of Police (DGP) via the Inspector General of Police (IGP) and the Deputy Inspector General of Police (DIG).

The SP, as head of the police force in a district, is responsible for day-to-day policing, investigation of crimes, maintaining law and order, and police administration.

The career progression of an SP involves advancing through three grades—senior time scale, junior administrative grade, and selection grade, and two insignias: one-star and two-star. In certain states, the SP in selection grade is known as the Senior Superintendent of Police (SSP), who heads a larger police district. The SP ranks above the Additional Superintendent of Police (Addl. SP) and below the DIG. Officers reaching the SP rank are predominantly selected from the Indian Police Service (IPS) and, alternatively, from the respective State Police Services (SPS). IPS officers begin as Assistant Superintendent of Police (ASP), while SPS officers start as Deputy Superintendent of Police (DSP/DySP), both heading police sub-divisions.

== Rank, recruitment, promotion ==
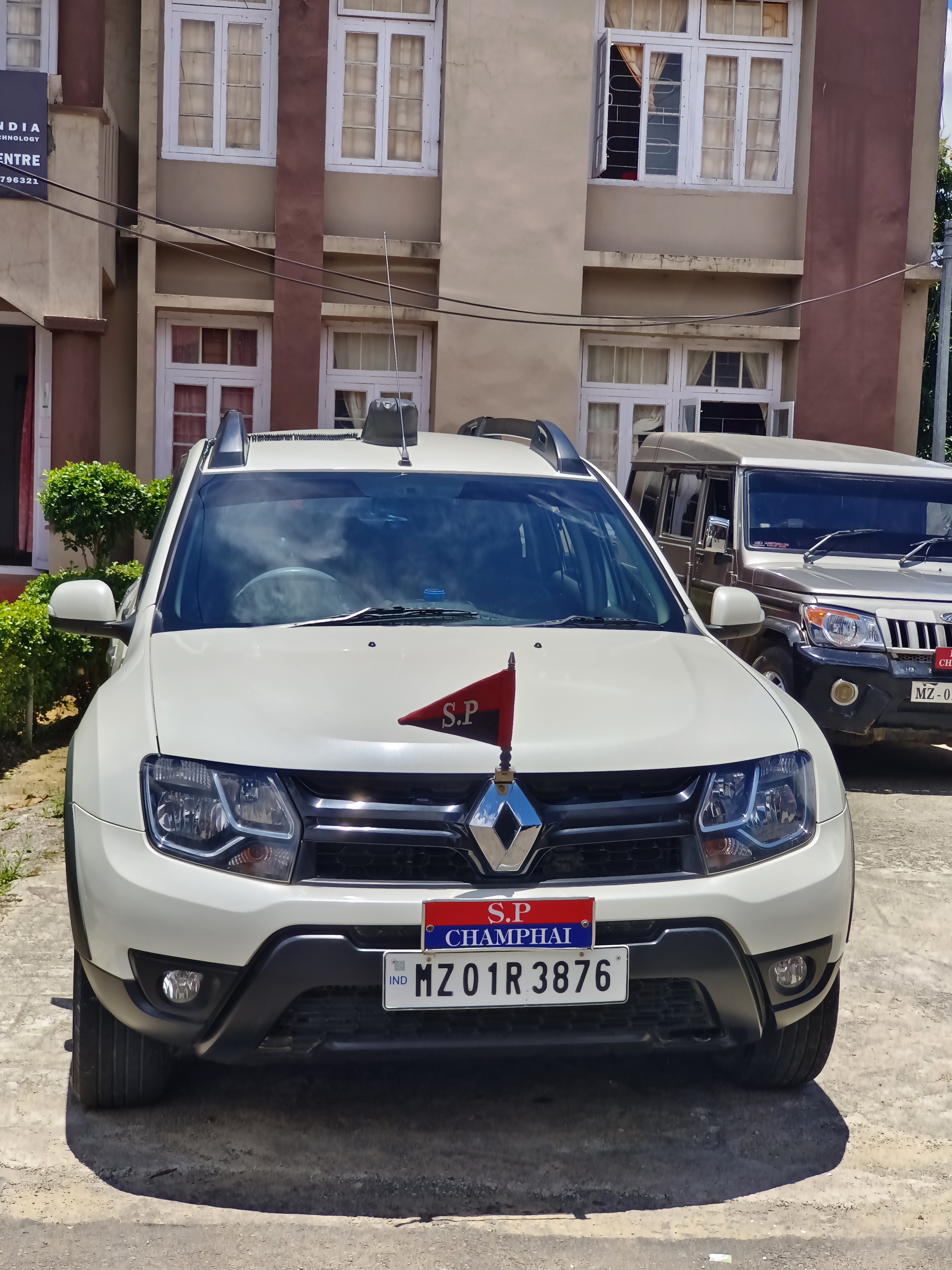
Official car of SP, Champhai district, Mizoram

The Superintendent of Police (SP) occupies the middle management level in a police force. The career progression for an SP involves postings in three distinct grades—senior time scale, junior administrative grade, and selection grade. In some states, an SP in the selection grade is also known as the Senior Superintendent of Police (SSP). Depending on the grade, an SP is distinguished by two insignias: one star and the national emblem for the first two grades, and two star and the national emblem for selection grade.

The rank of SP is positioned above the rank of Additional Superintendent of Police (Addl. SP), Assistant Superintendent of Police (ASP) or Deputy Superintendent of Police (DSP/DySP) and below the SSP, Deputy Inspector General of Police (DIG), Inspector General of Police (IGP), Additional Director General of Police (ADGP), and Director General of Police (DGP). The ranks from ASP/DSP to DGP falls within the broad category of superior officers in a police force. Postings in SP and above rank officers should have a term of at least two years, as per law.

There is no direct recruitment for the rank of SP. Officers attaining the SP rank are predominantly drawn from the Indian Police Service (IPS) and, alternatively, from the respective State Police Services (such as the Mizoram Police Service). IPS officers are recruited through the Civil Services Examination and initially posted as ASP in a state cadre during their probationary period. Meanwhile, state governments conduct recruitment for DSP rank through Public Service Commission examinations. Both ASP and DSP serves as the head of a sub-division. However, it takes 10 to 12 years for a DSP to be promoted to the SP rank, whereas an ASP can achieve this promotion within three years. An ASP is a gazetted officer. Some state governments conduct direct recruitments only for constable and sub-inspector (SI) ranks. Although uncommon, constable can also rise to the rank of SP through promotions.

For the official use of the Superintendent of Police, state governments have the authority to issue an official car. Additionally, they are also allotted a government residence, with security guards.

== Role ==
=== In superintendent-led police district ===
The police force in a state comprises both civil police and armed reserves. The Superintendent of Police (SP) may be appointed as the head of the civil police force within a designated police district. A police district is formally recognized through notification by state governments, encompassing areas that may either coincide with the district or be within its boundaries. Police districts under the purview of the SP are non-metropolitan and predominantly rural. When the size of the police district is substantially larger, an SP in selection grade, also known as the Senior Superintendent of Police (SSP), is appointed as the head. The SSP is also a post, in certain occasions, even after getting promoted to the Deputy Inspector General of Police (DIG) rank, an officer may continue as SSP. Several Indian districts have two or more police districts within them, segmented as rural and city. The rural police is headed by an SP and city police is headed by a Commissioner of Police. The latter's jurisdiction is called a commissionerate. While some districts have both rural and city police, the absence of a commissionerate system often results in each police district being overseen by one SP.

The SP, operating under the guidance of the Director General of Police (DGP), assumes responsibility for the administrative affairs of the police force within a designated police district. This encompasses a range of responsibilities, including financial and personnel administration, maintaining law and order, preventing and detecting crimes, overseeing surveillance and intelligence operations, ensuring the security of ministerial residences, addressing grievances, providing training to police personnel, enforcing discipline among the police, checking anti-social activities, and conducting routine inspections of subordinate police stations and offices, among others.

The SP, serving as the chief of police district, operates under the supervision of the DIG, who is in charge of the police range encompassing that police district. Sub-divisions within a police district are headed by Sub-Divisional Police Officers (SDPO), holding the ranks of Assistant Superintendent of Police (ASP) or Deputy Superintendent of Police (DSP). In Rajasthan and Uttar Pradesh, the equivalent post to SDPO is known as Circle Officer (CO). Each sub-division contains multiple police stations. The SP may receive assistance from Additional Superintendent of Police (Add. SP), alongside ASPs and DSPs. In Kerala, the post of SP as the head of a police district is designated as the District Police Chief (DPC).

The overall administrative head of a district is the district magistrate (also known as district collector), who also have law and order charges. The district magistrate possesses executive magisterial powers, including regulation, control, and licensing derived from the Code of Criminal Procedure (CrPC) and various special Acts, including but not limited to the Arms Act and Excise Act. These magisterial powers span a range of activities, from issuing orders for preventive arrests and declaring Section 144 to securing bonds of good behavior from potential or habitual offenders and employing force during law and order exigencies, among other responsibilities. Since police districts comes within the jurisdiction of the district magistrate, the administration of police within a police district comes under the general control and direction of the district magistrate. Hence, SP reports directly to the district magistrate. Consequently, there exists a dual control of police force within a district, requiring SP to co-operate with district magistrate. Within the force, SP serving as district chief, sends monthly reports to the DGP through Inspector General of Police (IGP) and DIG.

=== In commissionerate system ===
Major cities in India have the commissionerate system of policing rather than the traditional SP-led system. In metropolitan areas, with a population exceeding 1 million, the commissionerate system is implemented. In this system, the Commissioner of Police serves as the head of the commissionerate. This system is also adopted in certain non-metropolitan urban areas. In a commissionerate, an officer of SP rank may be appointed as the Deputy Commissioner of Police (DCP). ASPs may be appointed as the Assistant Commissioner of Police (ACP). In organizational hierarchy, a DCP holds a position below the Special Commissioner of Police (Special CP), Joint Commissioner of Police (Joint CP), Additional Commissioner of Police (Addl. CP), and Commissioner of Police. The post of the Commissioner of Police is held by DIG or above rank officers. However, when there was shortage of higher-ranking officers, there have been instances when an SP was appointed as the Commissioner of Police in non-metropolitan areas. The Commissioner of Police, holding the rank of DIG or above, may or may not be vested with some powers of executive magistrate, depending on whether the state government has granted such authority and the extent of the powers delegated.

In 2013 and 2014, the Government of Tamil Nadu released two orders granting DCPs certain powers of the executive magistrate in CrPC, pertaining to executing bonds from habitual offenders. In 2023, the Madras High Court criticized and quashed the two orders, citing that they were unconstitutional and ultra vires the legal provisions, as they violated the Constitution of India and the Madras Police District Act, 1859.

=== Other postings and deputation ===
In addition to having an SP as chief in each police district, other SP ranking officers may be appointed as the head of various units or specialised wings, such as telecommunication, traffic, vigilance, women's cell, special branch, crime branch, anti terrorist squad, among others. They can also be posted as Commandants of armed police battalion units. Additionally, they can also be appointed as the director of state women's commission and managing director of state-owned public sector companies.

IPS officers in SP rank can also be deputed to central investigation, intelligence, and police organisations, such as but not limited to the Central Bureau of Investigation (CBI), Intelligence Bureau (IB), and Central Armed Police Forces (CAPF). Officers expressing willingness to be deputed with the Union government are nominated by the state cadre. Data from the Ministry of Home Affairs in 2022 showed that most vacancies are in the rank of SP and DIG. Nominated officers are assessed by the Central Police Establishment Board (CPEB), and the selected names are sent to the Appointments Committee of the Cabinet (ACC) for approval.

== See also ==
- Additional superintendent of police (Addl.SP)
