= State Police Services =

Indian police services

The State Police Services (SPS) is an umbrella term for police services under different state governments in India. In India, police is a state subject and each state has its own police service. For example, Maharashtra Police Service (MPS) for Maharashtra Police or Provincial Police Service (PPS) for Uttar Pradesh Police. Its counterpart in the central government is the Indian Police Service (IPS), which is a higher civil service and All India Service. Recruitments are done through the respective state's Public Service Commission (PSC).

== Description ==
Police is part of the State List in the Constitution of India. The State Police Services (SPS) per se, is a collective term to refer the police services of individual state governments of India. Officers of these services are recruited and appointed by the states and has the status of gazetted officers of the state government. The SPS officers are ranked above the State Police Subordinate Service officers and below the Indian Police Service (IPS) officers.

The SPS officers are responsible for supervising the work of the state police subordinate service officers. Once appointed, they initially hold the rank of Deputy Superintendent of Police (DySP). In certain states, the SPS rank starts from inspector level, and in case of Maharashtra Police, from assistant inspector (API) onwards. In that case, inspector also holds gazetted status.

They are given various responsibilities, including posting as Station House Officers (SHOs), Circle Officers (COs)/ Sub-divisional Police Officer (SDPOs), Deputy Superintendents of Police (DSPs), Additional Superintendent of Police (Addl.SPs) and Superintendents of Police (SPs), depending on their rank and experience.

== Recruitment ==
The recruitment to these services are conducted by the respective state governments through their Public Service Commissions (PSCs). These exams typically consist of a written test, physical fitness test, and an interview. Upon clearing the selection process, candidates are appointed as SPS officers and undergo training at the police academy before being posted. SPS does not include police services in any of the Union Territory of India, which is under the central government, to which recruitment are made by the Union Public Service Commission (UPSC) through the Civil Services Examination.

After selection, these cadets are required to undergo probationary training before getting posted as Deputy Superintendent of Police (DSP) or Assistant Commissioner of Police (ACP). While some states have a direct recruitment process for SPS officers, others follow a promotion-based system. In certain states, such as Kerala, the recruitment process for SPS is based on promotion from within the state police forces.

== Ranks and insignia of SPS officers ==
=== State Police Service (SPS) ===
==== Hierarchical structure ====
- Superintendent of Police (Non-IPS)
- Additional Superintendent of Police (Addl.SP)
- Deputy Superintendent of Police (DySP/DSP)

State Police Services rank insignia
Insignia

Rank

Superintendent of police (Note: In an armed police battalion, the equivalent rank is "Commandant.)
Additional superintendent of police (Note: In an armed police battalion, the equivalent rank is Deputy Commandant)
Deputy superintendent of police (Note: In an armed police battalion, the equivalent rank is Assistant Commandant.)

Abbreviation

SP
Addl.SP
DSP/Dy.SP

- Note: Gazetted officers in State Police Services (SPS) begins from DSP and above.
- In the Indian Police Service (IPS), rank starts from Assistant Superintendent of Police (ASP), which is equivalent to DSP in state services.

=== Insignia of Gazetted officers ===
Gazetted officers include all the Indian Police Service officers and all state police service officers.

- National Emblem above two star (same insignia and pay band as a colonel in the Indian Army)

- Superintendent of police (selection grade)
- Other officers above selection grade

- National Emblem above one Star (same insignia and pay band as a lieutenant-colonel in the Indian Army)

- Superintendent of police
- Commandant of Battalion

- National Emblem (same insignia and pay band as a major in the Indian Army)

- Additional superintendent of police

- Three Stars (same insignia as a captain in the Indian Army; pay band of a Lieutenant)

- Assistant Commissioner of Police or Deputy Superintendent of Police
- Circle Officer (CO) in the states of Rajasthan and Uttar Pradesh
- Sub-Divisional Police Officer (SDPO)

== Promotion to Indian Police Service ==
The Indian Police Service (IPS) of any state has two components, namely DR Quota and Promotion Quota. Direct recruit IPS officers come through the Civil Services Exam conducted by the UPSC, while State Police Service officers are inducted into the IPS against the Promotion Quota.

The process of appointment from the State Police Service to the IPS against the Promotion Quota is a lengthy process involving three stakeholders- the concerned State Government, the Union Public Service Commission (UPSC), and the Union Government. The roles of these stakeholders are defined in the Indian Police Service (Recruitment) Rules, 1954, Indian Police Service (Appointment by Promotion) Regulations, 1955, and IPS (Regulation of Seniority) Rules, 1988. The process begins with the Central Government determining the vacancies against the promotion quota of any state for a particular calendar year. The State Government then forwards a proposal to the UPSC containing the details/records of the State Police Service officers in the order of their seniority. The UPSC then convenes a Selection Committee Meeting, which scrutinizes the records/ACRs and other details of the State Police Service officers as per the provisions of Regulation 5(4) of the promotions Regulations.

The Committee records its recommendations in the form of ‘Minutes,' which are signed by each member and the chairperson. These minutes are sent to the State Government concerned, which forwards them to the Central Government after its concurrence. The Central Government examines the minutes and conveys its concurrence to the UPSC. Finally, the Commission approves the minutes, and the Central Government, as the cadre controlling authority for the Indian Police Service, conveys its approval.

== List of state police services ==
- Andhra Pradesh Police: Andhra Pradesh Police Service (APPS)
- Arunachal Pradesh Police: Arunachal Pradesh Police Service (APPS)
- Assam Police: Assam Police Service (APS)
- Bihar Police: Bihar Police Service (BPS)
- Chhattisgarh Police: Chhattisgarh Police Service (CPS)
- Goa Police: Goa Police Service (GPS)
- Gujarat Police: Gujarat Police Service (GPS)
- Haryana Police: Haryana Police Service (HPS)
- Himachal Pradesh Police: Himachal Pradesh Police Service (HPPS)
- Jharkhand Police: Jharkhand Police Service (JPS)
- Karnataka Police: Karnataka State Police Service (KSPS)
- Kerala Police: Kerala Police Service (KPS)
- Madhya Pradesh Police: Madhya Pradesh Police Service (MPPS)
- Maharashtra Police: Maharashtra Police Service (MPS)
- Manipur Police: Manipur Police Service (MPS)
- Meghalaya Police: Meghalaya Police Service (MPS)
- Mizoram Police: Mizoram Police Service (MPS)
- Nagaland Police: Nagaland Police Service (NPS)
- Odisha Police: Odisha Police Service (OPS)
- Punjab Police: Punjab Police Service (PPS)
- Rajasthan Police: Rajasthan Police Service (RPS)
- Sikkim Police: Sikkim Police Service (SPS)
- Tamil Nadu Police: Tamil Nadu Police Service (TNPS)
- Telangana Police: Telangana State Police Service (TSPS)
- Tripura Police: Tripura Police Service (TPS)
- Uttar Pradesh Police: Provincial Police Service (Uttar Pradesh) (PPS)
- Uttarakhand Police: Provincial Police Service (Uttarakhand) (PPS)
- West Bengal Police: West Bengal Police Service (WBPS)
- Andaman and Nicobar Islands Police: DANIPS
- Chandigarh Police: DANIPS
- Dadra and Nagar Haveli and Daman and Diu Police: DANIPS
- Delhi Police: DANIPS
- Jammu and Kashmir Police: DANIPS
- Ladakh Police: DANIPS
- Lakshadweep Police: DANIPS
- Puducherry Police: Puducherry Police Service (PPS)

== See also ==
- Law enforcement in India
- Indian Penal Code
- Indian Police Service
- Central Armed Police Forces
- State Armed Police Forces
- Delhi, Andaman and Nicobar Islands Police Service
- National Police Memorial and Museum
- Police forces of the states and union territories of India
