= Additional superintendent of police =

Rank in Indian police forces

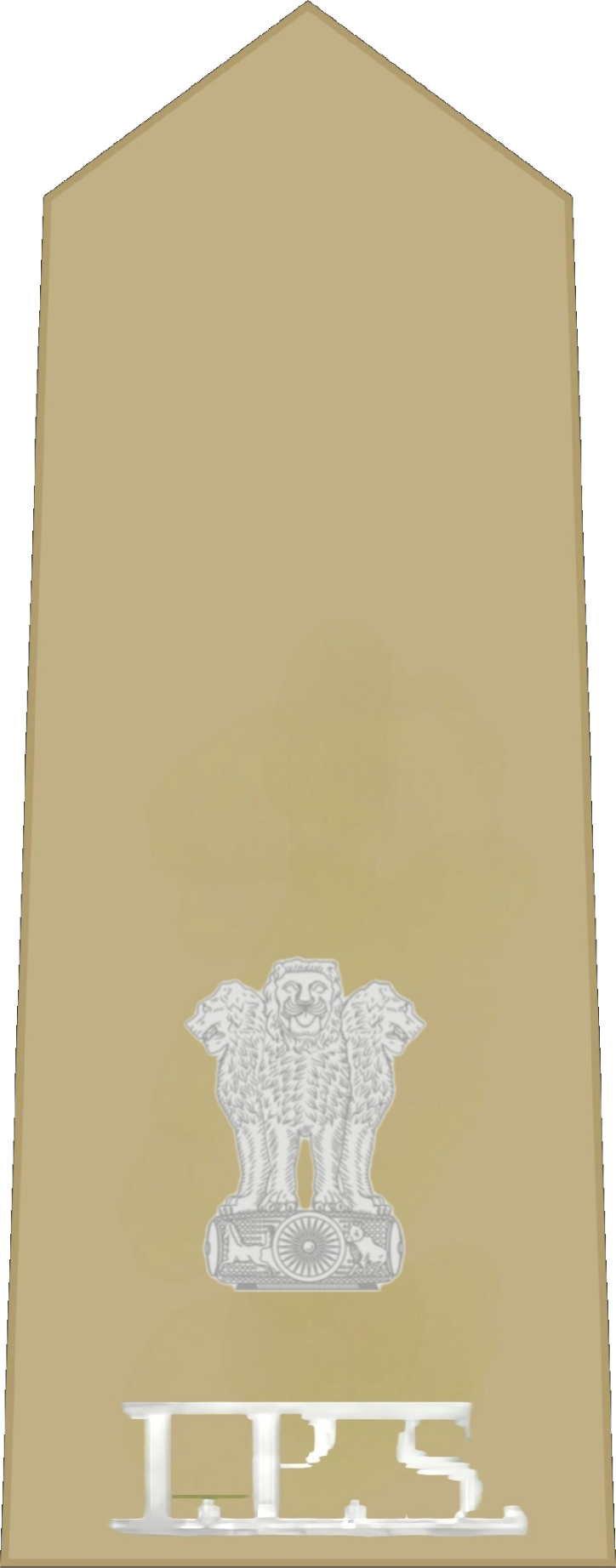
Insignia of an IPS officer with rank of additional superintendent of police.

Insignia of SPS officer with rank of additional superintendent of police.

Additional Superintendent of Police (abbreviated as Addl. SP or Addl. DCP) or Additional Deputy Commissioner of Police, is a rank in Indian police forces. The officer holding this rank can be from the Indian Police Service (IPS) or from respective State Police Services like the Provincial Police Service (PPS), West Bengal Police Service (W.B.P.S.), Odisha Police Service (O.P.S.), Maharashtra Police Service (M.P.S.), Kerala Police Service (K.P.S.), etc.

The Additional SP rank positioned above the Deputy Superintendent of Police (DySP/DSP) or Assistant Superintendent of Police (ASP) and below the Superintendent of Police (SP).

In police commissionerate system, Addl. SP is appointed in the post of Additional Deputy Commissioner of Police (Addl.DCP), who heads a zone, division or a unit. In the hierarchy Addl.DCP is above the Assistant Commissioner of Police (ACP) and below the Deputy Commissioner of Police (DCP).

The function of and Addl.SP is to assist the Superintendent of police in their control of duties and supervision. An Addl. SP is usually in charge of a large urban area within a District or of the whole district, or is a Deputy Commandant of an Armed Police Battalion. Addl. SP can also be in charge of a subject matter area under a District SP, such as Administration, Traffic, Intelligence, Operations or Headquarters. In all appointments they report to the District SP or to the Commandant of the Battalion.

IPS officers usually reach the rank of Addl. SP after 4 years of service, while State Police Service officers reach the rank after 7-12 years of service. If the SP is not in charge then the Addl.SP takes the responsibility over district.

== See also ==
- Superintendent of Police (SP)
- Police ranks and insignia of India
