= Jharoda Kalan =

- village
- Location in Delhi, India
- Coordinates: 28.6528°N 76.9539°E
- Country: India
- State: Delhi
- District: South West Delhi
- Established: 12th century

Government
  - Body: MLA
- Elevation: 204 m (669 ft)

Languages
  - Official: Haryanvi, Hindi, English
- Time zone: UTC5:30 (IST)
- Postal code: 110072

Jharoda Kalan is a village in South West district, Delhi, India. The Police Training College of the Department of Police, Delhi is located in Jharoda Kalan. The CRPF camp is located here.nearest railway station from this location is delhi sarai rohilla railway station which is approx. 30 km from here
