= Sub-divisional police officer =

Officer post in India

Sub-divisional police officer (SDPO) is a police officer position in India. In some states and union territories, such as Rajasthan and Uttar Pradesh, this appointment is also known as circle officer (CO). He holds the rank of deputy superintendent of police (DSP) or assistant superintendent of police (ASP) and heads a police sub-division. In commissionerate system in metropolitan cities, the post is equivalent to Assistant commissioner of police (ACP).

Shoulder insignia of ACP

The nomenclature varies from state to state. However, the most common term is sub-divisional police officer (SDPO), and the functions are the same throughout India. A police sub-division is an administrative unit of the police in India, which comprises several police circles and police stations.

Circle officer or SDPO is responsible for overseeing law and order, crime prevention, and investigation within a designated area known as a police subdivision. They supervise and coordinate the activities of all police stations and units under the jurisdiction of that subdivision.

== See also ==
- Sub-divisional inspector, a former rank used by London's Metropolitan Police for the commander of a sub-division.
