= Assistant superintendent =

Police rank used in Commonwealth police forces

Assistant superintendent, or assistant superintendent of police (ASP), is a rank that was used by police forces in the British Empire and is still used in many police forces in the Commonwealth. It was usually the lowest rank that could be held by a European officer, most of whom joined the police at this rank. In the 20th century, it was in many territories opened to non-Europeans as well.

== India ==
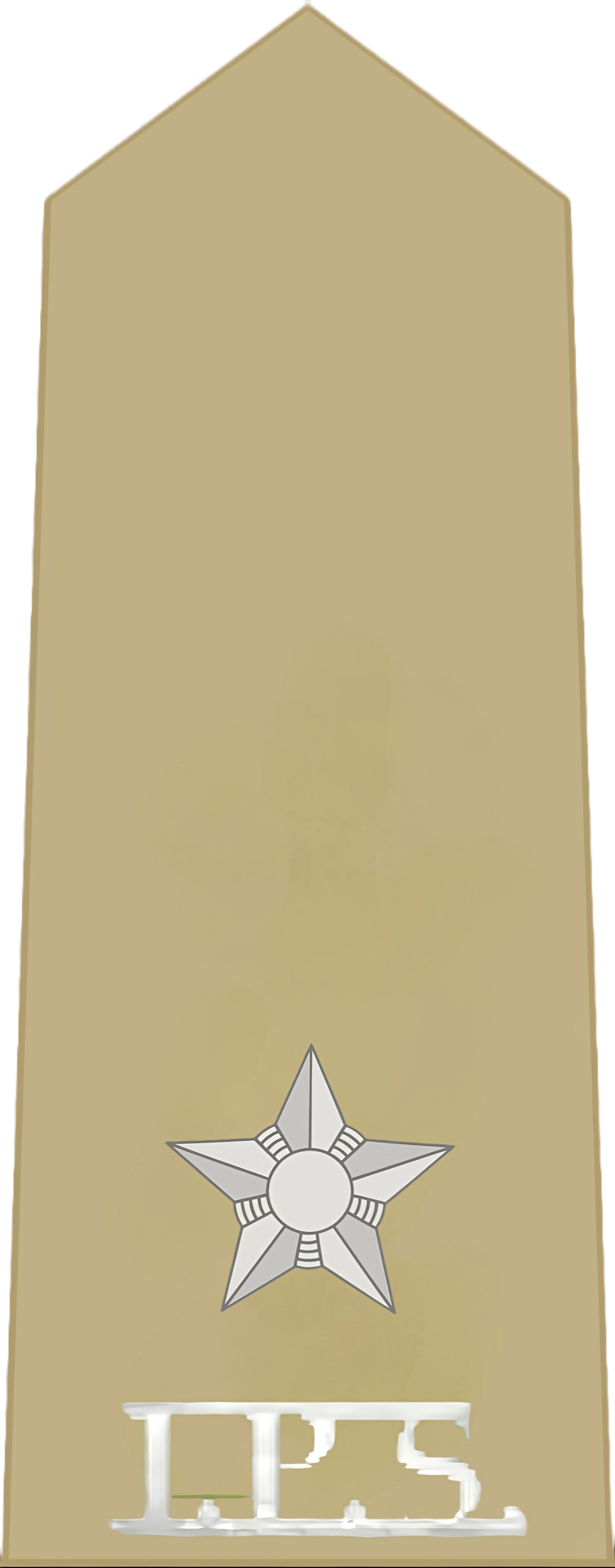
First year of service

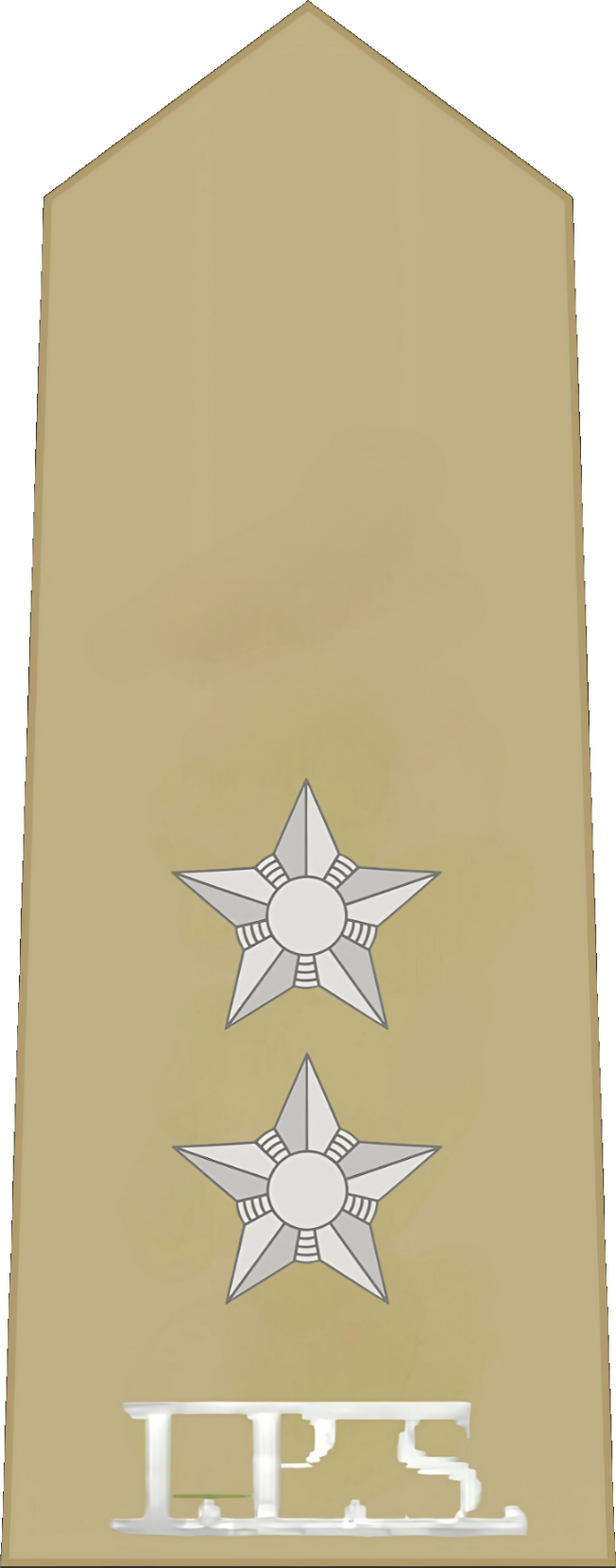
Second year of service

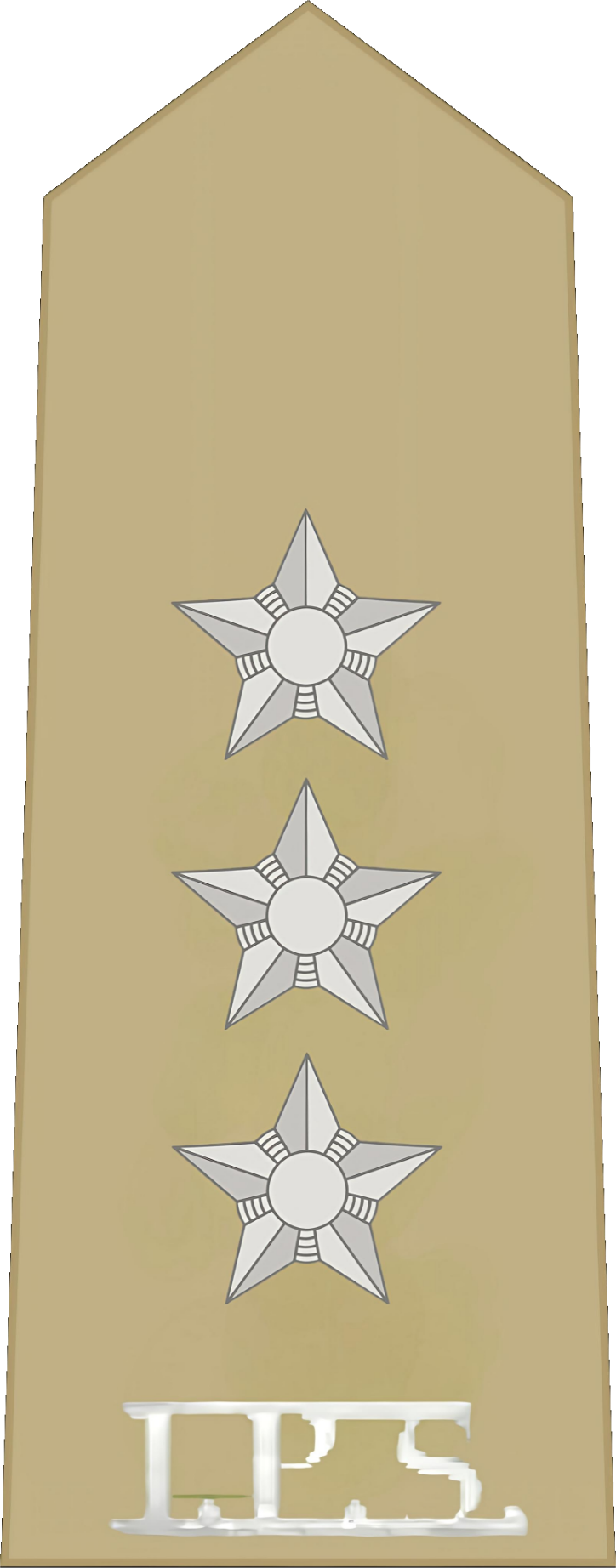
After completion of training

Insignia of an assistant superintendent of police in India

Assistant superintendent of police (ASP) is an entry-level rank in the Indian Police Service (IPS). Officers at this rank are either undergoing training or serving in the field during the early years of their service. The ASP is equivalent in rank to a deputy superintendent of police (Dy.SP) in the state police services. Typically assigned to subdivisions within districts, ASPs are responsible for maintaining law and order, supervising police stations, and leading investigations. The first posting is usually as the station house officer (SHO) of a police station, followed by assignment to a police sub-division as the sub-divisional police officer (SDPO). Selected through the Civil Services Examination conducted by the Union Public Service Commission (UPSC), IPS officers are trained at the Sardar Vallabhbhai Patel National Police Academy in Hyderabad before taking up ASP roles. Assistant superintendent of police is a probationary rank for the first year and is held by officers when under training at SVPNPA.

== The Bahamas ==
In the Royal Bahamas Police this rank is above inspector and below superintendent. An ASP wears three bath stars or pips on the shoulder.

== Bangladesh ==
First year of service

After completion of probation and training

Insignia of an assistant superintendent of police in Bangladesh

One-third of assistant superintendent of police (ASP) positions are filled by promotion from inspector. The remaining two-thirds are recruited through competitive Bangladesh Civil Service (BCS) written and oral examinations. Applicants are required to have a four-year degree or equivalent. Recruits undergo a year-long training course at the Bangladesh Police Academy as probationary ASPs. After passing out from the academy, they serve six months on field attachment.

== Nigeria ==
An assistant superintendent of police is selected by the head of the Nigeria Police Force in a state, the Commissioner of Police, from eligible candidates that must have achieved the rank of inspector of police. The rank is directly below deputy superintendent of police. A student who graduate from the Nigeria Police Academy is commissioned into the Nigerian Police Force as an assistant superintendent of police.

== Pakistan ==
In Pakistan, an assistant superintendent of police is a selected through the Central Superior Services examination. An ASP is the entry level rank of the Police Service of Pakistan.

== Sri Lanka ==
In the Sri Lanka Police Service, the rank of assistant superintendent of police (ASP) is a senior gazetted officer in Sri Lanka police. The rank is above the rank of chief inspector of police (CIP) and below a superintendent of police (SP). Generally an ASP would be in command of a group of police stations in a police division. Direct entry to the rank is possible for graduates while chief inspector of police (CIP) would be promoted as well. They are similar to the Commissioned officers in Armed forces, Sri Lanka

== Singapore ==
In the Singapore Police Force, ASP is the second lowest senior officer rank, immediately above an inspector and below a deputy superintendent of police. New police officer cadets holding university degrees graduate from the Home Team Academy as inspectors.

In the National Police Cadet Corps, the rank of acting assistant superintendent of police (A/ASP (NPCC)) is given to inspectors who have not attained the rank of ASP (NPCC) but have been appointed as the officer commanding of their unit. The rank insignia of assistant superintendent of police and acting assistant superintendent of police is the same, with both wearing the Singapore coat of arms, with the letters 'NPCC' below it to differentiate NPCC ranks from Singapore Police Force ones.

NPCC officers who hold the rank of assistant superintendent of police have a single row of silver braid on the peak of their cap (for males) or bowler hat (for females).
