= Deputy superintendent of police =

Rank used by several police forces

Deputy superintendent of police (DSP) is a rank used by several police forces in the Commonwealth and formerly in the British Empire. The rank is usually above assistant superintendent and below superintendent.

== India ==
Insignia of deputy superintendent of police in India

The rank of deputy superintendent of police (DSP or DySP) was created in 1876 as the policy of Indianisation was introduced. It was originally a rank only held by Indians and was equivalent to assistant superintendent (a rank then only held by Europeans).

Deputy superintendents of police are officers who belong to the State Police Services (SPS) of the respective Indian states. Officers are either directly recruited through the respective Public Service Commission examinations or promoted from lower ranks. Deputy superintendents of police can be promoted to the Indian Police Service (IPS) after several years of service which varies from 8 to 15 years depending on the state. Deputy superintendents of police are typically assigned the charge of a police sub-division under a police district in the post of sub-divisional police officer (SDPO). In the states of Rajasthan and Uttar Pradesh, the post is known as circle officer (CO).

Under Indian law, a deputy superintendent of police may serve as the investigative officer (IO) in instances involving terrorism, dowry deaths, atrocities against scheduled caste, and corruption. The IPS rank of assistant superintendent of police (ASP) is equivalent to the rank of deputy superintendent of police. In the commissionerate system, the equivalent post is assistant commissioner of police (ACP). The rank above deputy superintendent of police is additional superintendent of police (Addl. SP) and the rank below is inspector.

== Singapore ==
Insignia of deputy superintendent of police in Singapore

The rank of deputy superintendent of police is the highest rank attainable by an officer in the National Police Cadet Corps. The rank of acting deputy superintendent of police is vested onto NPCC headquarters appointment holders who have not actually attained the rank of deputy superintendent of police. The rank insignia of deputy superintendent of police and acting deputy superintendent of police is the same, with both wearing the Singapore coat of arms above a single pip.

NPCC officers who hold the rank of deputy superintendent of police have a single row of silver braid on the peak of their cap (for males) or bowler hat (for females).
