= Stephen Raveendra =

Indian police chief

ADGP M. Stephen Raveendra, IPS
- Born: Mutyala Stephen Raveendra; 14 February, 1973; Andhra Pradesh
- Education: B. Sc. (Osmania) - 1994, M. Sc. (Osmania) - 1996
- Alma mater: St. Paul's High School, Hyderabad, Nizam College, Hyderabad, University College of Science, Department of Zoology, Osmania University, Secunderabad
- Known for: Uprightness and impeccable track record
- Spouse: Smt. Vineela-Raveendra
- Relatives: Prof. M. Theophilus (Grandfather); Sri M. B. Ranjit (Father)
- Police career
- Indian Police Service: Telangana Police Cadre
- Service years: 1999 - Present
- Status: Director, Telangana Traffic Management, Road and Rail Safety Bureau (TG-TMARS)
- Rank: Additional Director General of Police,
- Badge no.: 19991022
- Awards: 2004, Antrik Suraksha Seva Padak, 2005, Police Medal for Gallantry, 2010, Prime Minister's Police Medal for Life Saving; 2016, President's Police Medal

Muthyala Stephen Raveendra (ముత్యాల స్టీఫెన్ రవీంద్ర, born 14 February 1973) is Director, Telangana Traffic Management, Road and Rail Safety Bureau (TG-TMARS) w.e.f. 12 November 2026. Raveendra is a 1999 batch Regular Recruit (52RR) of the Indian Police Service who got trained at the Sardar Vallabhbhai Patel National Police Academy, Hyderabad, India and was inducted into the IPS on 20 September 1999. Raveendra was the West Zone Deputy Commissioner of Police, Hyderabad City Police. and was DIG in the elite special forces of Greyhounds. In 2015, Raveendra was a resource person at the Strategic Gaming Exercise on Left Wing Extremism held by the United Service Institution, New Delhi.

== Early life, schooling and collegiate studies ==
Officer Raveendra is the son of an illustrious Police Officer DSP M. B. Ranjit who earlier retired as the Assistant Commissioner of Police, Asifnagar Division, Hyderabad City Police. Raveendra was schooled at St. Paul's High School, Little Flower Junior College and Nizam College, all in Hyderabad. He graduated from Nizam College in 1994 and then entered the portals of Department of Zoology at the University College of Science, Osmania University. There were learned Entomologists comprising Professors S.S.Thakur, B. Julius Divakar, P. Judson, B. Kishen Rao and others. Stephen was enthused by Entomology and specialized in it and graduated from the learned portals of the University in 1996.

After post-graduate studies at Department of Zoology, Osmania University where he received a gold medal in Zoology, he cleared the Union Public Service Commission entrance and opted for IPS and underwent training at the Sardar Vallabhai Patel National Police Academy, Hyderabad.

== Career ==
Raveendra's initial posting was in Warangal District where he was groomed by Damodar Gautam Sawang, the then Deputy Inspector General of Police, Warangal Range. Incidentally, Noel Swaranjit Sen happened to be the Director General and Inspector General of Police of Andhra Pradesh when Raveendra was in Warangal District. The colleagueship of Swaranjit-Sawang-Stephen helped in containing the terrorist tactics of Naxalites.

In the past, sometime in 2019, it was indicated that Stephen Raveendra has been tipped to be the new Intelligence Chief of Andhra Pradesh w.e.f 30 May. Moves by the incumbent Chief Minister, Y. S. Jaganmohan Reddy to his neighbouring counterpart, K. Chandrashekar Rao point towards this direction and steps seem to have been made at the Centre to quickly move the files and get the Officer on deputation from Telangana to Andhra Pradesh.

== Achievements ==
So far in Raveendra's career he has encountered Naxalism (as SP-in-Warangal), Factionalism (as SP-in-Anantapur), Corruption (as SP-in-Karimnagar), Regionalism (as DCP-in-East Zone) and eradicated drugs from Hyderabad city. (as DCP-in-West Zone)

The areas under the jurisdiction of West Zone are in the news due to frequent arrests of persons possessing drugs. The problem of drugs is under current debate so much that the former Commissioner of Police, A. K. Khan, even addressed a seminar conducted at the Centre for Economic Studies in Hyderabad on the topic "War on Drugs" where Officer Raveendra was also present .Mr.Raveendra in a dare-devil act of self-less courage saved the lives of 61 patients who were trapped in a fire accident in a hospital for which he was awarded the prestigious Prime Minister's Life saving Medal. Likewise, he was awarded Gallantry medal for high-risk anti-extremist operations.

Parallels may be drawn between the colleagueship of Commissioner of Police A. K. Khan and Deputy Commissioner of Police Raveendra to Mumbai's then Commissioner of Police Julio Francis Ribeiro and Deputy Commissioner of Police Y. C. Pawar who also waged a war on drugs during their tenures in the mid eighties.

In the past, he was Police commissioner of Cyberabad Metropolitan Police from 25 August 2021 through 12 December 2023, and Inspector General of Police of West Zone (Hyderabad and Nizamabad Ranges) also holding full additional charge as Deputy Inspector General of Police (Hyderabad Range)

Police appointments
| Preceded by Position created | Director, Telangana Traffic Management, Road and Rail Safety Bureau (TG-TMARS); 12 November 2026- | Succeeded by Incumbent |
| Preceded by D. S. Chauhan, IPS | Commissioner, Civil Supplies and Ex-Officio Principal Secretary to Government Consumer Affairs, Food & Civil Supplies (CAF&CS) Department; 29 September 2025-12 November 2026 | Succeeded by Y. Nagi Reddy, IPS |
| Preceded by Vijay Kumar, IPS | Additional Director General of Police, Greyhounds, Telangana; 10 July 2024-29 September 2025 | Succeeded by Dr. Anil Kumar, IPS |
| Preceded by Abhilasha Bisht, IPS | Additional Director General of Police, Home Guards, Telangana; 19 December 2023-10 July 2024 | Succeeded by Swati Lakra, IPS |
| Preceded by Abhilasha Bisht, IPS | Additional Director General of Police, Welfare and Sports of Telangana State Police (Full Additional Charge); 19 December 2023-10 July 2024 | Succeeded by Vijay Kumar, IPS |
| Preceded by Post created | Director (Full Additional Charge); Telangana State Cyber Security Bureau; 3 January 2023-19 December 2023 | Succeeded by Shikha Goel, IPS |
| Preceded by V. C. Sajjanar, IPS | Commissioner of Police, Cyberabad Metropolitan Police; 25 August 2021-12 December 2023 | Succeeded by Avinash Mohanty, IPS |
| Preceded by Akun Sabharwal, IPS | Inspector General of Police, West Zone and Deputy Inspector General of Police (Full additional charge); Hyderabad Range; 24 March 2017-25 August 2021 | Succeeded by Y. Nagi Reddy, IPS |
| Preceded by T. V. Shashidhar Reddy, IPS | Joint Commissioner of Police, Cyberabad West; 28 June 2016-24 March 2017 | Succeeded by Shahnawaz Qasim, IPS |
| Preceded by G. Pala Raju, IPS | Group Commander, Greyhounds; 20 November 2012-2016 | Succeeded by Tarun Joshi, IPS |
| Preceded by C. Ravi Varma, IPS | Deputy Commissioner of Police, West Zone, Hyderabad City Police; 18 January 2010–20 November 2012 | Succeeded by G. Sudheer Babu, IPS |
| Preceded by | Deputy Commissioner of Police, East Zone, Hyderabad City Police; 30 July 2009–18 January 2010 | Succeeded by Mahesh Chandra Laddha, IPS |
| Preceded by Vikram Singh Mann, IPS | Superintendent of Police, Karimnagar District; 25 June 2009–30 July 2009 | Succeeded by N. Sivasankar Reddy, IPS |
| Preceded by | Superintendent of Police, Chief Minister of Andhra Pradesh's Security Group, 25 March 2008 – 25 June 2009 | Succeeded by |
| Preceded by Sanjay Kumar Jain, IPS | Superintendent of Police, Anantapur District; 17 September 2006–24 March 2008 | Succeeded by Murgesh Kumar Singh, IPS |
| Preceded by K. Srinivasa Reddy, IPS | Superintendent of Police, Warangal District; 29 December 2004 – 16 September 2006 | Succeeded by Soumya Mishra, IPS |
| Preceded by M. M. Bhagawat, IPS | Additional Superintendent of Police, Bellampally, Adilabad District –29 December 2004 | Succeeded by |
| Preceded by | Assistant Superintendent of Police, Parkal, Warangal District; 1999– | Succeeded by |
