= SHE Teams =

- Motto: For you..With you..Always!

Agency overview
- Formed: 24 October 2014; 12 years ago

Jurisdictional structure
- Operations jurisdiction: Hyderabad, Telangana
- Legal jurisdiction: Telangana State

Operational structure
- Headquarters: Hyderabad, Telangana
- Agency executive: Shika Goel, IPS , Addl. Commissioner of Police (Crimes & SIT)
- Parent agency: Telangana State Police

Website
- Official website

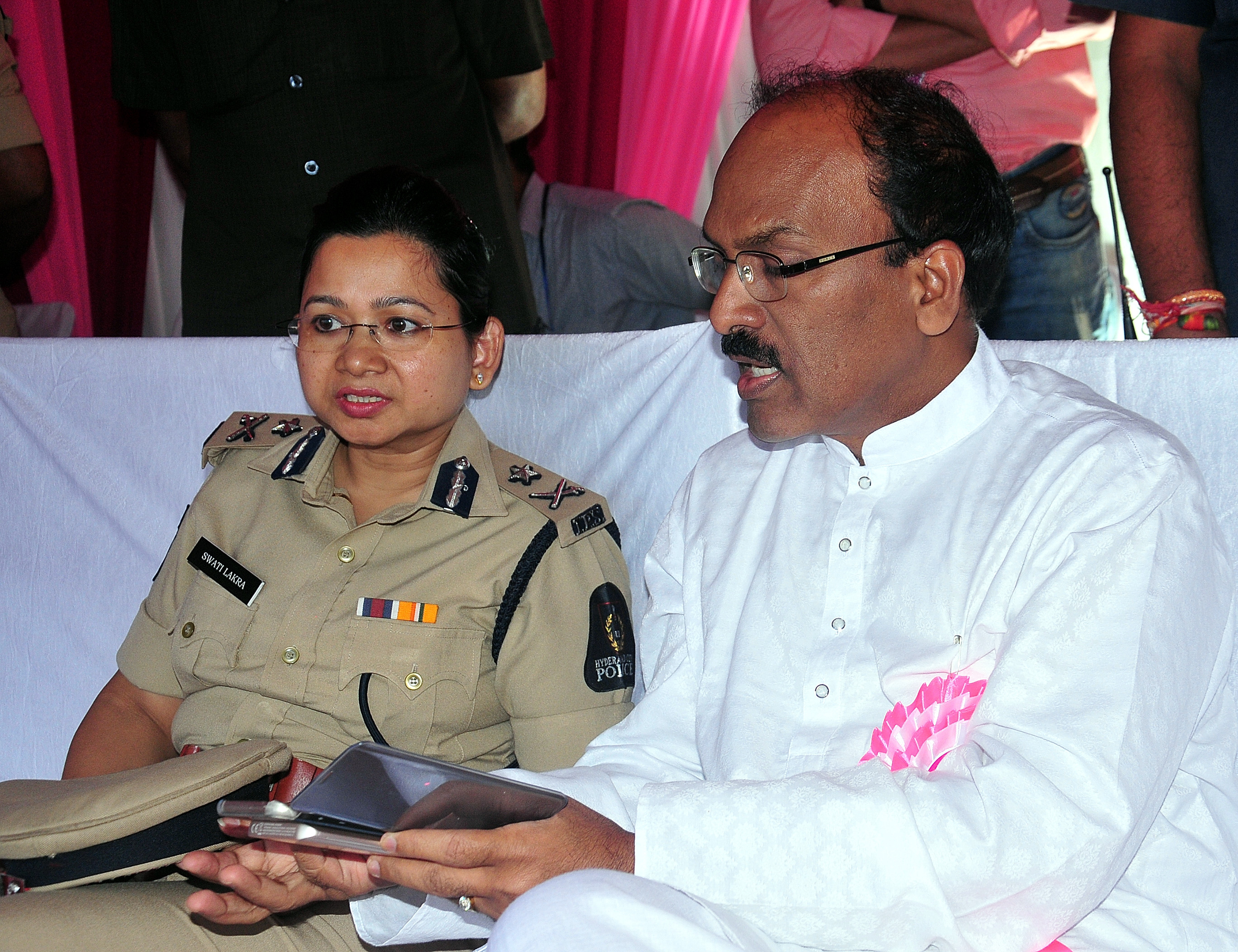
Swati Lakra, head of SHE Teams, at the Maha Bathukamma celebrations held at LB Stadium on 8 October 2016.

SHE Teams is a division of Telangana Police for enhanced safety and security of women. They also work to prevent child marriages in Telangana State. The teams work in small groups to arrest eve teasers, stalkers and harassers. They operate mainly in busy public areas in Hyderabad. They respond to complaints delivered by WhatsApp and through social media.

== History ==
SHE Teams stands for Safety, Health and Environment. The division was started on 24 October 2014, is a brainchild of Chief Minister of Telangana, K. Chandrashekar Rao who was impressed by a similar initiative in Singapore. Additional Commissioner, Hyderabad, Swathi Lakra heading the division ever since its inception.

== The Teams ==
A team comprises an Assistant Sub-Inspector (ASI), who acts as a lead with four to five male and female constables in each Zone, they all work under Assistant DCP rank woman police officer. They work undercover.

The cases related to harassment of women under Rachakonda commissionerate had come down by 85 percent. The 24×7 monitoring by the teams, conducting decoy operations, SHE Shuttles, Margadarshak and counselling sessions are proving to be effective in curbing the crime rate.

== Case lodging ==
As a deterrent, the first time offenders are mostly booked under petty cases like Sec 290 IPC and Sec 70 (c) of the Hyderabad city police act.

More serious and repeat offenders are likely to be booked under 509 IPC (word act or gesture intended to insult the modesty of a woman), section 354IPC (assault or criminal force on a woman with the intent to outrage her modesty), could potentially lead to an offence under section 376 (rape).

== Expansion ==
In Hyderabad, there are 100 teams in operation by March 2018. The division is present in Adilabad, Nizamabad. It is being expanded to other districts in Telangana State.
