= C. V. Anand =

Indian police official

C.V. Anand IPS
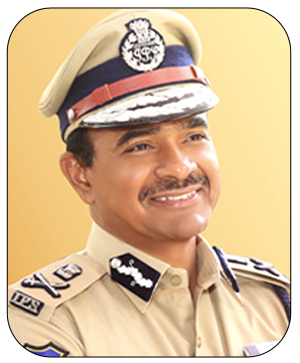
- Born: 5 June 1968 (age 58)
- Education: The Hyderabad Public School, Begumpet; Osmania University
- Relatives: Chama Milind (son)
- Police career
- Service: Indian Police Service
- Allegiance: India
- Department: Telangana Police
- Service years: 1991 - Present
- Rank: Director General of Police
- Awards: Police Medal for Gallantry; President's Police Medal for Distinguished Service; Police Medal for Meritorious Service; Antrik Suraksha Seva Padak

C. V. Anand is an Indian Police Service officer. He is the Director General of Police of Telangana. He earlier served as the Commissioner of Police, Hyderabad City and as the Commissioner of Police, Cyberabad.

== Early life and education ==
Anand was born in Ranga Reddy district. The family later moved to Hyderabad. He was schooled at The Hyderabad Public School, Begumpet. He was part of the batch of 1986. Anand then enrolled for a bachelor's degree in arts at Nizam College. He subsequently attended the University College of Arts, Osmania University. He obtained his Master of Arts degree in economics with a gold medal.

A budding cricketer, Anand was part of the India national under-19 cricket team. He also played for the Hyderabad cricket team at the U-19 and the U-22 levels. He represented Osmania University in the Inter-varsity cricket tournaments.

In 1990, Anand appeared for the Civil Services Examination and cleared it in his first attempt. He was ranked 147. He opted for the Indian Police Service (IPS) and was allotted his home cadre of Andhra Pradesh.

== Police Career ==
=== Training ===
Anand joined the Sardar Vallabhbhai Patel National Police Academy which trains probationary IPS officers before they join the police service. At the academy, he excelled in athletics, winning multiple gold medals in track and field. He was also adjudged the 'Best Firer' at the BSF Academy.

=== Early years ===
In 1993, Anand was posted as an Additional Superintendent of Police (Addl. SP) Warangal Rural. The function of an Addl. SP is to assist the Superintendent of police in their control of duties and supervision. After over two years in Warangal, he was posted as Addl. SP Bellampalli in the Adilabad district. During this tenure, he was involved in multiple encounters, including with the coal mafia in Mancherial.

Promoted to the rank of Superintendent of police (SP), Anand was appointed SP, Nizamabad district. As the police chief of a district with Naxalite–Maoist insurgency, he planned and participated in multiple combing operations. He also worked towards breaking the Naxals' weapon supply chain and was instrumental in weaning the youth away from Naxals. During this tenure, he attended International conference on Crime Investigation & Human Rights in South Africa. At the turn of the century, he was posted as SP, Krishna district. Here he tried to modernise the police force by adopting technology. For this tenure, he was awarded the Police Medal for Gallantry.

Anand was subsequently transferred to Hyderabad as the Deputy commissioner of police (DCP), East zone. In 2002, the reorganisation of Hyderabad City Police was carried out and the Central zone was created. Anand was appointed the first DCP of Central zone. In this tenure, he created the Lake Police to police the Hussain Sagar and the surrounding areas. The creation of the lake police reduced the number of suicides in the lake area. He was instrumental in outsourcing non-core duties to private firms, to free up police personnel for core policing duties. The Government of Andhra Pradesh ordered this to be implemented in all police stations. For this, he was commended by the Sardar Vallabhbhai Patel National Police Academy.

Anand then moved the Crime Investigation Department (CID). After promotion to the rank of Deputy inspector general of police (DIG), he took over the Economic offences wing (EOW) of the CID. He solved the Krushi Cooperative Bank scam and brought back from Thailand K. Venkateswara Rao, the bank's chairman. Anand then moved outside the police department, having been posted as Director Excise where he served for 2 years.

Anand was subsequently was appointed DIG of Eluru range. The range included the districts of Krishna, East Godavari and West Godavari. Anand was then appointed Commissioner of Police, Vijayawada. As Vijayawada police commissioner, he concentrated and cracked down on history sheeters and political violence. He also introduced e-challan systems and reorganised the commissionerate.

=== Senior appointments ===
In 2010, Anand was promoted to the rank of Inspector-general of police and appointed Additional Commissioner of Police (Traffic) (Addl, CP Traffic) in Hyderabad. As the traffic chief of the city, Anand is credited with easing traffic snarls by employing traffic engineering methods. He is also credited with many innovations, like challans which simplified issuance and collection of fines, introduction of speed guns and hand-held cameras for all traffic cops and adoption of social media to convey traffic-related updates.

After a three-year tenure, in May 2013, he was appointed Commissioner of Police, Cyberabad Metropolitan Police. He served in this appointment during the Telangana agitation and the formation of the new state of Telangana. After the creation of the state, he was absorbed into the Telangana cadre. The Cyberabad commissionerate had a high density of land dispute cases, due to the real-estate boom in the Greater Hyderabad Area. Anand introduced to SOP to deal with these land dispute cases. With the growth of the Software industry in Telangana, he introduced measures for women safety in the IT corridor with the SHE app, SHE teams and SHE shuttles. During his tenure as Cyberabad police commissioner, he was awarded the National Award for Best Poll Practices by the Election Commission of India for election-related measures in expenditure monitoring and tackling money power during the 2014 Indian general election. he received the award from former President Dr. APJ Abdul Kalam and was the first IPS officer to receive the award.

After a three-year tenure, Anand was appointed Commissioner, of Consumer affairs, Food & civil supplies. He was the first IPS officer to hold the post. The appointment is generally held by an IAS officer. In response to Anand's appointment, the IAS Officers' Association registered their protest with the Chief Minister of Telangana. The Special Operation Team (SOT) of Cyberabad Police, when he was Commissioner, had unearthed a major scam in the Civil supplies department. Anand was thus chosen to contain the corruption.

In early 2018, Anand was deputed to the Government of India for five years and was appointed Inspector General Central Industrial Security Force (CISF), a Central Armed Police Force responsible for providing security to large installations and institutions. He headed the Airport sector II, headquartered at Bangalore. During this tenure, he also held additional charge as IG South Sector, headquartered at Chennai for 9 months. He also headed the West Sector for 6 months. After a two-and-a-half year stint, in August 2020, he was appointed Director of the National Industrial Security Academy (NISA). NISA is located in Hyderabad and is the training academy of the CISF. In August 2021, Anand was promoted to the rank of Additional director general of police (ADGP).

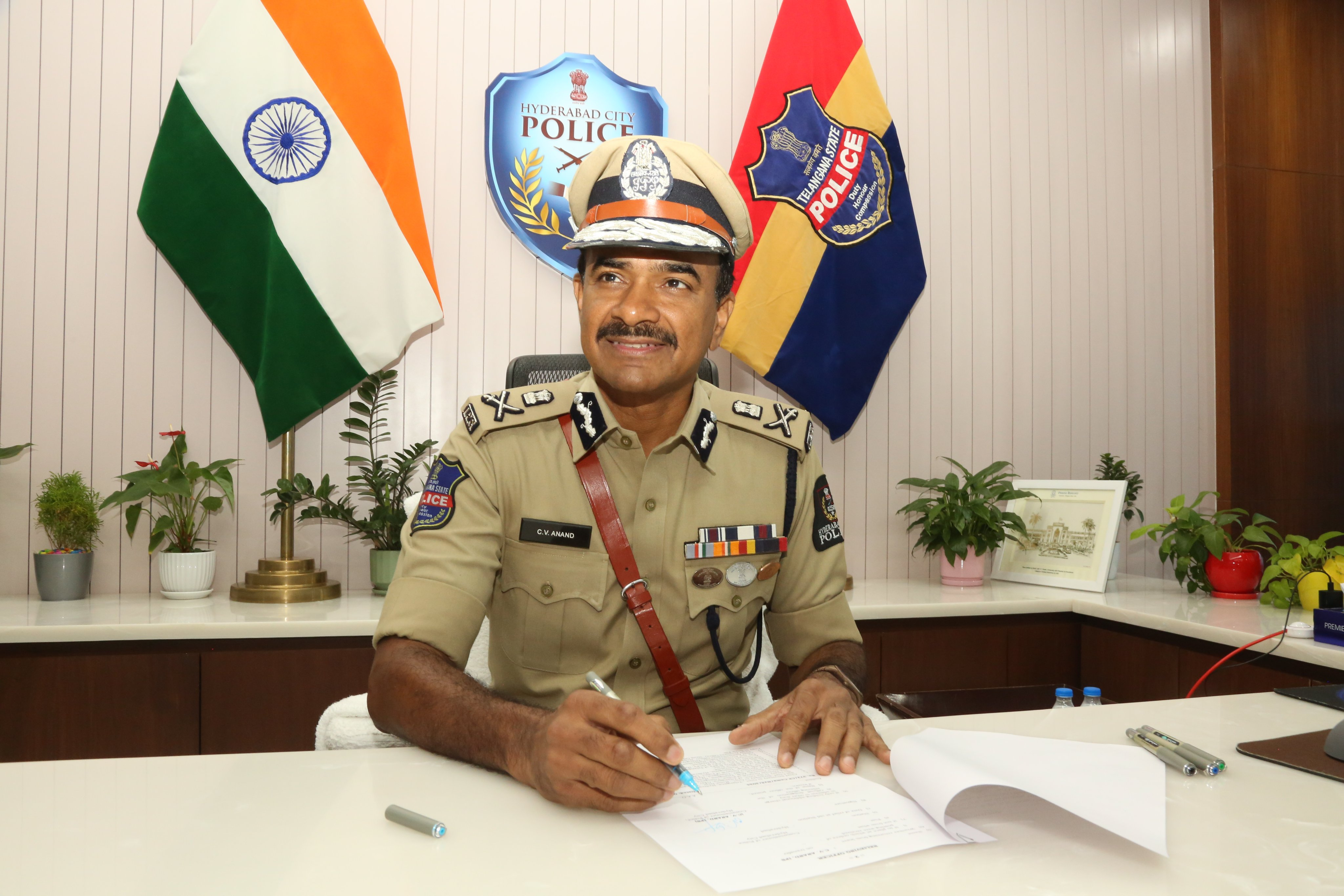
Anand taking over as Commissioner of Police, Hyderabad City for the second time.

On 25 December 2021, Anand was appointed the 58th Commissioner of Police (CP), Hyderabad. He took over from Anjani Kumar. He cracked down on corruption, dismissing from service 55 police officers in his first year as CP. He created a new wing, Hyderabad Narcotics Enforcement Wing (H-NEW), to combat narcotics menace in the city. Based on the success of H-NEW, a new bureau for the entire state, Telangana-Narcotics Bureau (T-NAB), was formed and Anand was given additional charge of the new bureau. A woman inspector was appointed as the Station House Officer (SHO), the head of a police station, for the first time in his tenure. The Integrated Command and Control Centre (ICCC) housing the new police commissionerate was inaugurated during his tenure as CP. Anand also effected the first reorganisation of the Hyderabad City Police in three decades. The city police force now has 7 zones with 28 divisions.

After a two-year tenure as CP, in December 2023, Anand relinquished charge and was appointed Director General, Anti-Corruption Bureau. In July 2024, he was given additional charge of Director General (Vigilance & Enforcement). On 9 September 2024, Anand took over as Commissioner of Police, Hyderabad for the second time. On 27 September 2025, he was appointed Special Chief Secretary (Home) to the Government of Telangana. He was succeeded by V. C. Sajjanar as Police Commissioner.

On 1 May 2026, he took over as the Director General of Police of Telangana, succeeding B. Shivadhar Reddy.

== Personal life ==
Anand is married to Lalitha Anand, a former professor with a Ph.D. in corporate finance. The couple has two sons. His elder son, Chama Milind is a professional cricketer. He plays for the Hyderabad cricket team and has played for the India national under-19 cricket team and for the Royal Challengers Bangalore in the 2022 Indian Premier League.

== Controversies ==
=== Remarks on National Media (December 2024) ===
During a press conference on 22 December 2024, CV Anand criticized national media outlets, accusing them of being "bought over" and lacking integrity. He stated, "All bought over. No shame." These comments were made in response to persistent questions about the ongoing investigation into a stampede at Sandhya Theatre during the premiere of "Pushpa 2: The Rule," which resulted in a woman's death and her child's injury. Anand later apologized for his remarks, acknowledging that he had lost his composure under repeated questioning.

== Awards and decorations ==
Anand was awarded the Police Medal for gallantry in 2002, the Police Medal for Meritorious Service in 2007 and the President's Police Medal for Distinguished Service in 2017.

C.V. Anand and Hyderabad Narcotics Enforcement Wing won first place in the ‘Excellence in Anti-Narcotics Award’ at the World Police Summit 2025.

== See also ==
- Cyberabad Metropolitan Police
- Rachakonda Police Commissionerate

Police appointments
Preceded by Ch. Dwaraka Tirumala Rao	Commissioner of Police, Cyberabad; 2013 - 2016	Succeeded by V. Naveen Chand
Preceded by Anjani Kumar	Commissioner of Police, Hyderabad City; 2021 - 2023	Succeeded by Sandeep Shandilya
Preceded by Ravi Gupta	Director General, Anti-Corruption Bureau; 2021 - 2023	Succeeded by Vijay Kumar
Preceded by K. Sreenivasa Reddy	Commissioner of Police, Hyderabad City; 2024 - 2025	Succeeded by V. C. Sajjanar
Preceded by B. Shivadhar Reddy	Director General of Police, Telangana; 2026 - Present	Incumbent
