= Nizamabad Police =

Nizamabad Police Commissionerate
- Motto: Duty, Honour, Compassion

Agency overview
- Formed: 1876 A.D
- Employees: Commissioner of Police; Deputy commissioner Additional Deputy Commissioners; Police Inspectors; Assistant Police Inspectors; Sub Inspectors

Jurisdictional structure
- Operations jurisdiction: Nizamabad, Telangana, India
- Legal jurisdiction: Nizamabad District
- Governing body: Government of Telangana

Operational structure
- Headquarters: Nizamabad City
- Agency executive: Mr. K.R. Naga Raju, Commissioner of Police
- Parent agency: Telangana Police

Facilities
- Stations: 35
- Cars: Mahindra Bolero 44, Toyota Innova Crysta ~20
- Motorcycles: Hero Glamour 50
- Jeeps: Rakshak Jeeps ~50

Website
- Official website

The Nizamabad Police Commissionerate is the local law enforcement agency for the city and district of Nizamabad and is headed by Commissioner of Police. The city police traces its origins to 1847 under Hyderabad State. The whole jurisdiction of the district is administrated by District Police Commissionerate Office located in Nizamabad.

== History ==
Nizamabad was founded in the year 1905 when Nizam's dominion were recognized. The Nizam of Hyderabad ruled over the Deccan region during 18th century and under his reign the law enforcement agency was formed. The Nizamabad Police was headed by Deputy Inspector General prior to October 2016, when the districts of Telangana were re-organized the Chief Minister, K. Chandrashekar Rao passed a resolution that Nizamabad district police would be upgraded as commissionerate.

== Organizational structure ==
The Nizamabad Police Commissionerate is headed by Commissioner of Police, who is an IPS officer. There are 3 Sub-Divisions and each division consists of circles and each circle consists of particular number of police stations. Then again each Circle is headed by a Circle Inspector and every Police station is headed by Sub - Inspector.The whole jurisdiction of the district is administrated by District Police Commissionerate Office located in Nizamabad. The city is also the headquarters for District Armed Reserve Force.

Division	Circle	Police Stations
Nizamabad North	Town Circle, Traffic Circle, North Rural Circle & SHO Zone	08
Nizamabad South	South Rural Circle & Dichpally Circle & Dharpally Circle	10
Armoor	Armoor Rural & Bheemgal Circle	10
Bodhan	Bodhan Rural, Rudrur Circle	07

== Infrastructure ==
=== Interceptor Vehicles ===
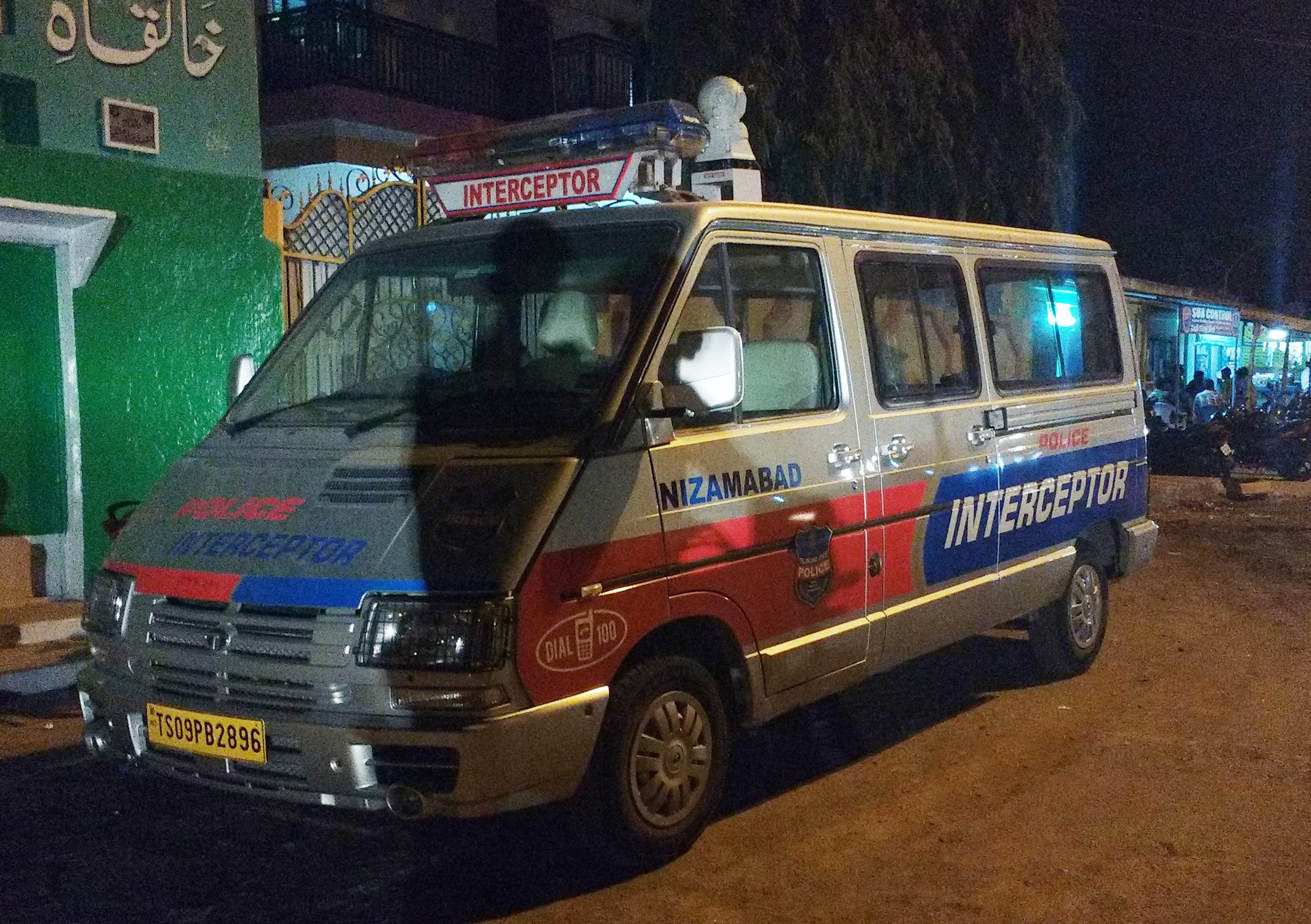
The Interceptor has a 360 degrees rotating camera to keep an eye on the over speeding vehicles.

In 2015 the state government allotted Police Interceptor Vehicle (Multi-purpose SUV) to maintain law and order, the vehicle is equipped with sophisticated speed camera, Breath Analyzer to find whether anyone was driving the vehicle after consuming alcohol. The vehicle also has a 360 degrees rotating camera to keep an eye on the over speeding vehicles.

=== Online Presence ===
In February 2015, Nizamabad Police offered crime reporting service through social network WhatsApp. The SP said that the citizens can send the video or clippings on the mobile number +919491398540 which can help the police nab the criminals.

== Branches ==
=== Crime branch ===
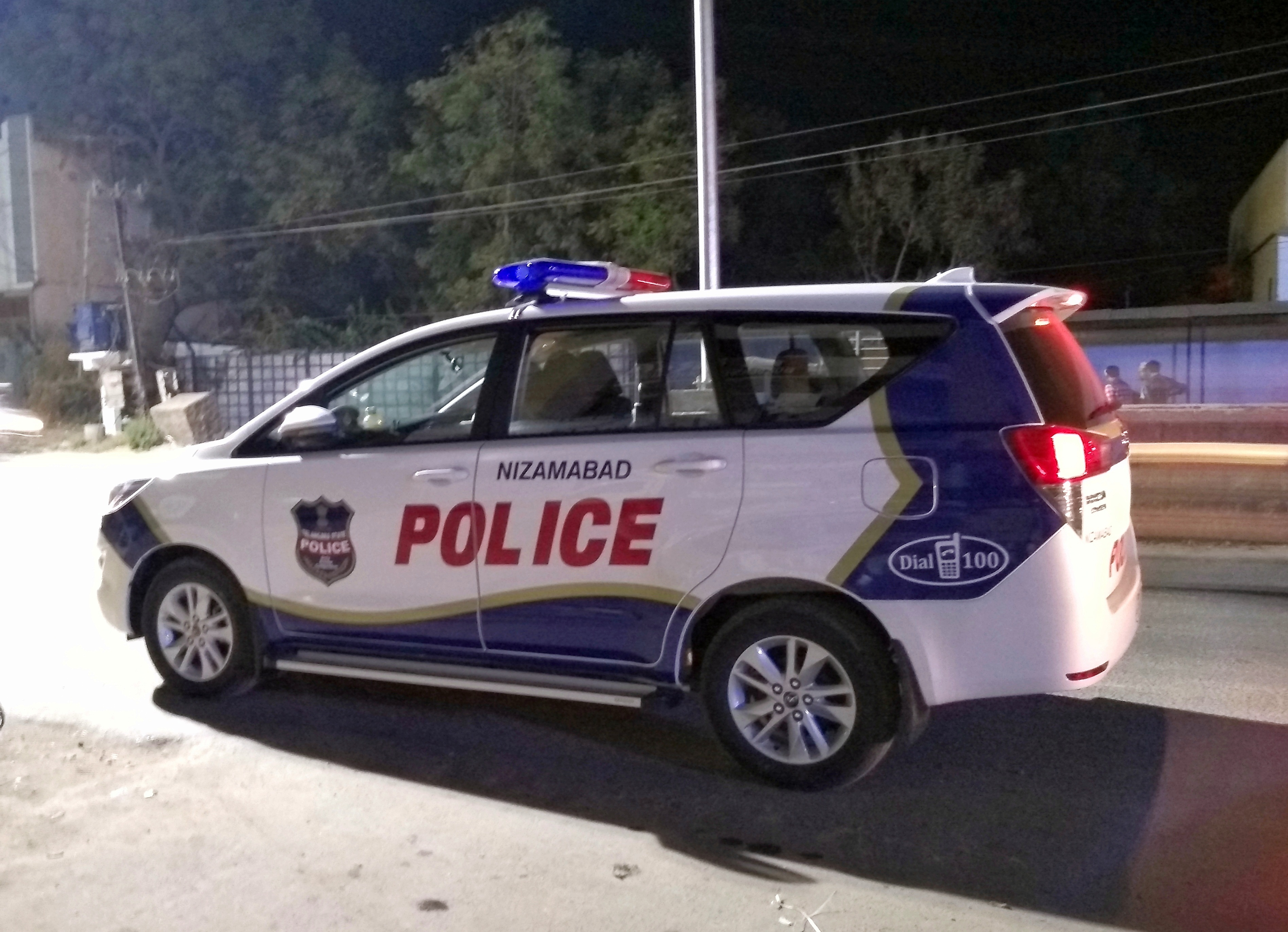
Nizamabad City Police Car

This is the main branch of the Nizamabad Police which deals with the prevention and detection of crime in the city and district. It is headed by Superintendent of Police. In 2012, with a plan to bring the city under the radar 22 CCTV cameras were installed in the city at 11 important junctions without taking a single penny from the government. Additionally more 50 CCTV cameras were installed in 2015 for strict monitoring of traffic and to avoid conflicts between the communities during the festive season of Eid Ul Azha and Ganesh Chaturti.

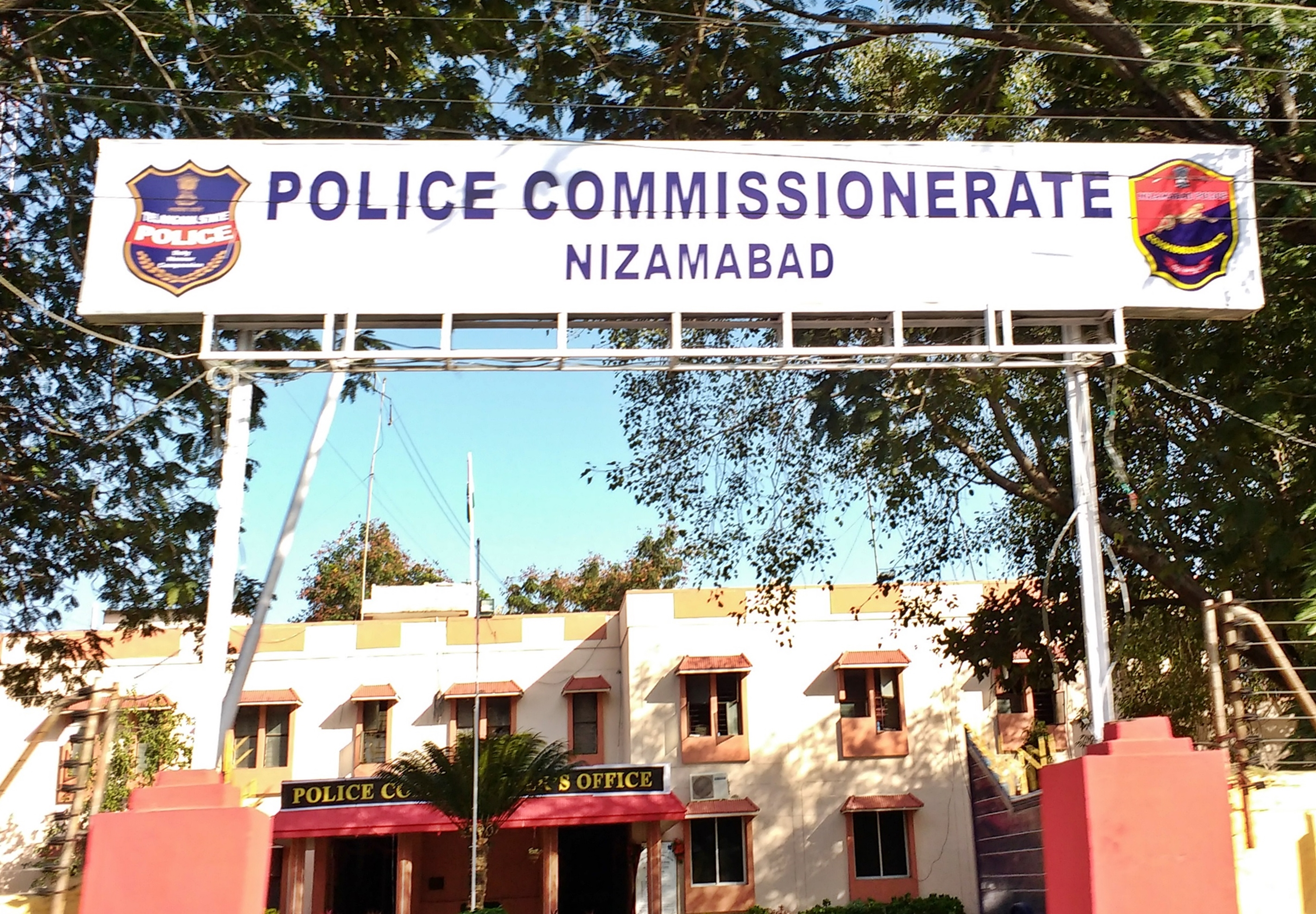
Nizamabad Commissionerate Headquarters

=== Traffic branch ===
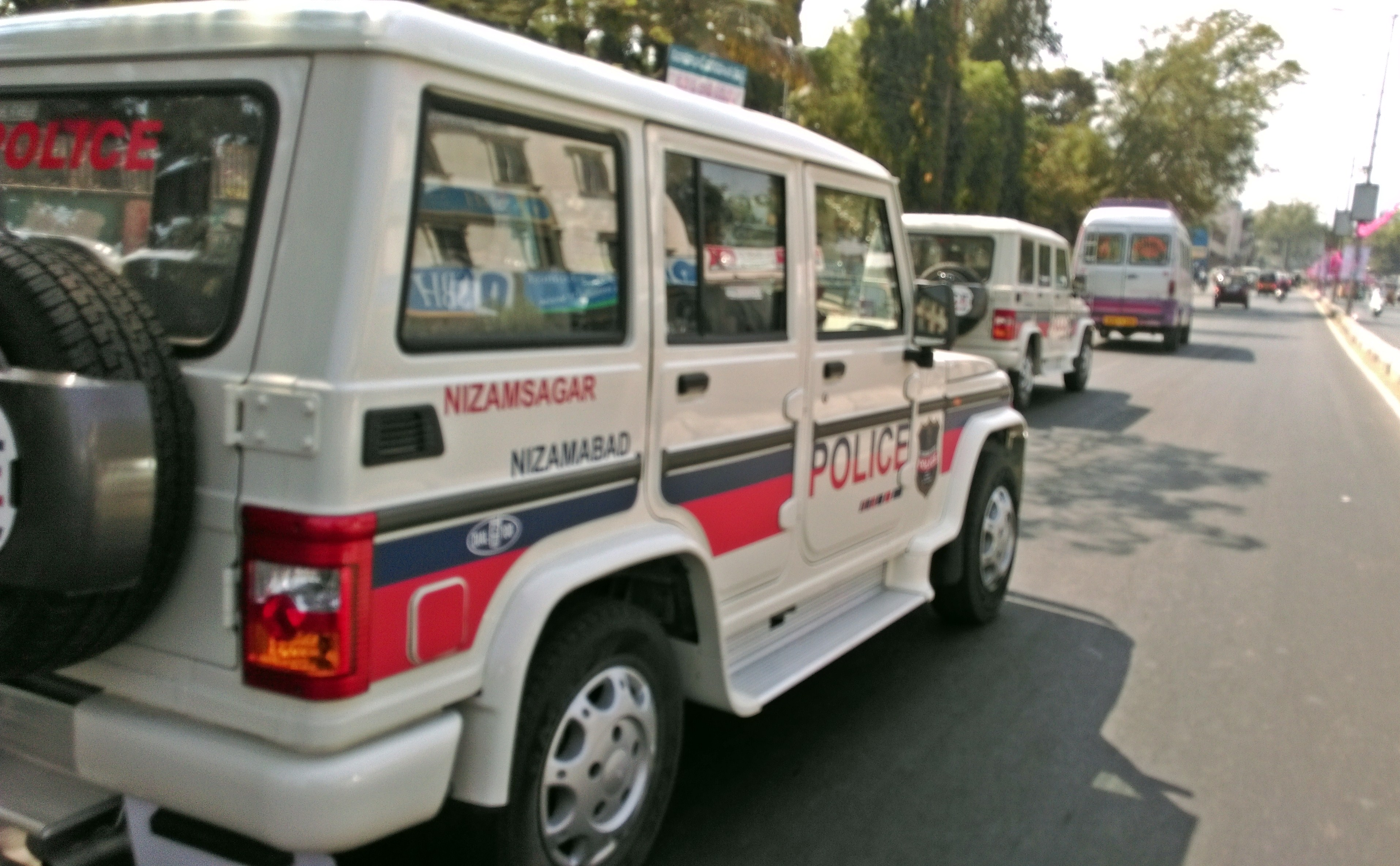
Nizamabad Police SUV

Traffic Branch deals with road and traffic safety, traffic regulations, prevention and reduction in the number of accidents. Traffic police use the newly allotted Mahindra Bolero SUV's and the old Rakshak Jeeps for patrolling. The Traffic branch has a Highway patrol unit too. As the city is under CCTV surveillance there is a control room set up for monitoring the traffic and crime.

Substations: Major traffic junctions and public places have a sub-station located near them to avoid public inconvenience. Every sub-station has an Incharge along with two police staff for the smooth functioning.

=== SHE teams ===
With the aim to curb eve-teasing and harassment against women, Telangana state police launched SHE Teams for every district in the month of April 2015. The five SHE Teams of Nizamabad consists Sub-Inspector of Police, a woman constable and three other constables to protect women from harassment and eve-teasing at public places. The teams have their own vehicles and a police station.

Women's Protection Emergency Call: 1091

=== Blue Colts ===
Blue Colts is another police force wing inducted for effective policing and to prevent crimes and keep a strict vigil in the city and district. Telangana Government introduced Blue Colts in 2015 and allotted 50 motor vehicles in the district. These teams can reach the interior places where the police Rakshak teams cannot reach in time.

=== Mobile patrolling ===
Every police station have their own four wheeler and two wheeler vehicle fleet to patrol in their areas to maintain law and order. There is a night round patrolling party of 5 to 6 police staff in each car patrolling their areas at midnight in the Nizamabad.

== See also ==
- Karimnagar Police Commissionerate
- Hyderabad City Police
- Visakhapatnam City Police
- Bangalore City Police
