= Telangana Integrated Command and Control Centre =

Centralised policing and emergency response facility in Telangana, India

- TGICCC
- Location within Telangana

General information
- Type: Command and control centre
- Location: Road No. 12, Banjara Hills, Hyderabad, Telangana, India
- Coordinates: 17°24′53.2″N 78°25′39.0″E
- Opened: 4 August 2022
- Owner: Telangana State Police

Technical details
- Floor count: 20

Website
- tspolice.gov.in

Telangana Integrated Command and Control Centre (TGICCC) is a modern policing and emergency management facility located in Banjara Hills, Hyderabad, Telangana. It serves as the central hub for the Telangana Police, integrating technological and operational functions to enhance surveillance, crime control, and emergency response. It acts as State Multi Agency Disaster Management Centre.

== History and inauguration ==
The TGICCC was inaugurated on 4 August 2022 by Chief Minister K. Chandrashekar Rao. The facility was constructed at a cost of over ₹600 crore and spans over 6.42 lakh square feet. It houses the Hyderabad City Police Commissionerate and serves as a nerve center for operations and disaster management.

== Architecture and organisation ==
The TGICCC complex comprises five towers, each with specialized functions:

- **Tower A** – Houses the 20-storey Hyderabad City Police Commissionerate, including offices for the Commissioner, Joint Commissioners, and a rooftop helipad.
- **Tower B** – Accommodates data management, the Cyber Security Bureau, Anti-Narcotics Bureau, and a tech incubation center.
- **Tower C** – Includes an auditorium and press briefing hall.
- **Tower D** – Reserved for training and media outreach.
- **Tower E** – Functions as the multi-agency operations hub, with facilities for the Chief Minister during disasters, DGP office, emergency numbers (Dial 100/112), and a museum on Telangana Police heritage.

== Functions and capabilities ==
The TGICCC integrates over a lakh CCTV cameras state-wide for real-time monitoring and predictive policing. Advanced data analytics and artificial intelligence modules enable tracking of crime patterns, public safety risks, and resource allocation. As the main node for Dial 100/112, the centre ensures coordinated action by police, fire, health, and civil agencies. It also serves as the state disaster command centre.

== Significance ==
TGICCC is seen as pioneering in India for technology-led policing and inter-departmental emergency coordination. The project has attracted officials from other states wishing to study its unified approach to urban security.
