= Warangal Police Commissionerate =

- Common name: Warangal City Police

Agency overview
- Formed: 12 December 2015
- Employees: Commissioner of Police; Deputy commissioner Asst Commissioners; Police Inspectors; Sub Inspectors; Asst. Sub Inspectors

Jurisdictional structure
- Operations jurisdiction: India
- Area: 5,672 sq.m
- Population: 2.3 million
- Legal jurisdiction: Warangal District Hanamkonda Jangaon
- Governing body: Government of Telangana
- General nature: Local civilian police

Operational structure
- Headquarters: Warangal, Telangana, India
- Agency executive: Sunpreet Singh, I.P.S, Commissioner of Police
- Parent agency: Telangana Police

Facilities
- Stations: 50

Website
- warangalpolice.telangana.gov.in

Warangal Police Commissionerate is a city police force with primary responsibilities in law enforcement and investigation within the districts of Hanamkonda, Warangal district and Jangaon.

== Building ==
The foundation stone was laid for a new police commissionerate building with latest technology.

As of March 2025, Sunpreet Singh, IPS, a member of the 2011 IPS Batch, holds the position of Warangal Commissioner of Police.
