= Anjani Kumar =

Indian police officer (born 1966)

Anjani Kumar, IPS Director General of Police, Telangana
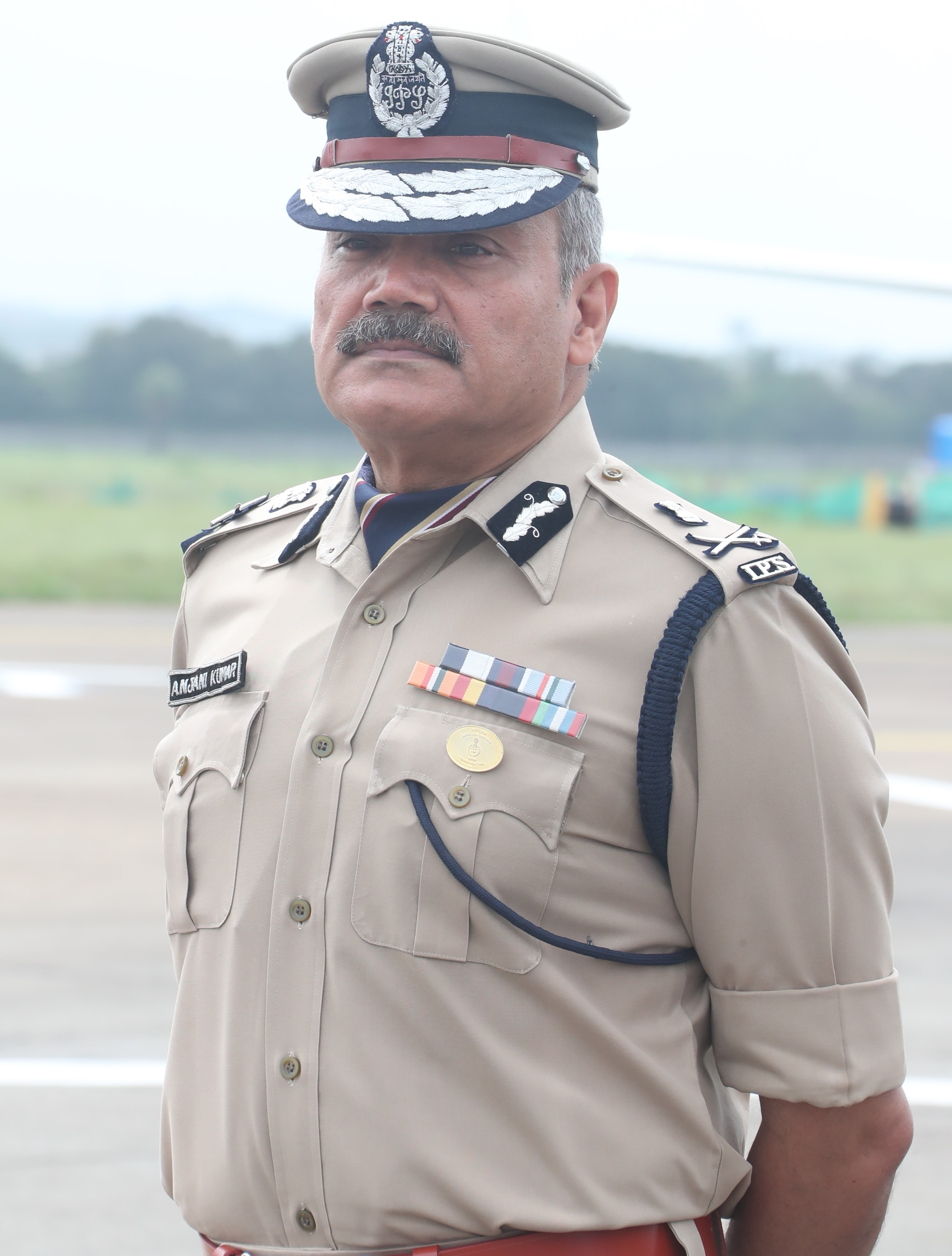

3rd Director General of Police, Telangana
- In office 31 December 2022 – 3 December 2024
- Preceded by: M. Mahender Reddy
- Succeeded by: Ravi Gupta

Commissioner of Police, Hyderabad City
- In office 12 March 2018 – 24 December 2021
- Preceded by: V. V. Srinivasa Rao
- Succeeded by: C. V. Anand

Personal details
- Born: 28 January 1966 (age 60) Patna, Bihar, India
- Education: Kirori Mal College, Delhi University; St. Xavier's High School, Patna
- Known for: Longest serving Commissioner of Police, Hyderabad City
- Police career
- Service years: 1990 – 2026
- Rank: Director General of Police
- Awards: President's Police Medal for Distinguished Service; Indian Police Medal for Meritorious Service; Antrik Suraksha Seva Padak; United Nations Peace Medal 1998; United Nations Peace Medal 1999

Anjani Kumar is a retired Indian Police Service (IPS) officer who served as the Director General of Police (DGP) of Telangana and as the Commissioner of Police, Hyderabad City. He took charge as DGP of Telangana on 31 December 2022, succeeding M. Mahendra Reddy. Earlier in his career, he served with the International Police Task Force (IPTF) from 1998 to 1999 during the United Nations Mission in Bosnia and Herzegovina.

== Education ==
He studied at Kirori Mal College, Delhi University, and St. Xavier's, Patna. During his training at the Sardar Vallabhbhai Patel National Police Academy, he won the Maharaja of Tonk Cup for the Best Horse Rider of his batch and the RD Singh Cup for being the Best Swimmer of his batch.

== Career ==
Anjani Kumar has held the following posts during his career:

- April 2025: Director General, Prisons and Correctional Services, Andhra Pradesh
- 31 December 2022: Director General of Police, Head of Police Force, Telangana State
- 25 December 2021: Director General, Anti-Corruption Bureau, Telangana, Hyderabad City
- 12 March 2018: Commissioner of Police, Hyderabad City
- Additional Director General of Police (Law and Order), Telangana
- Additional Commissioner of Police (Law and Order), Hyderabad City
- Inspector General of Police, Warangal Range, Telangana
- Deputy Inspector General of Police, Nizamabad Range, Telangana
- Chief of Greyhounds (elite anti-naxal unit), Telangana & Andhra Pradesh
- Chief of Counter Intelligence Cell, Andhra Pradesh
- Assistant Superintendent of Police, Jangaon, Telangana
- 20 August 1990: Appointed to IPS

== Awards ==
- President's Police Medal for Distinguished Services – 2016
- Indian Police Medal for Meritorious Services – 2007
- National Award by Election Commission of India for Security Management – 2019
- United Nations Peace Medal 1998 for working in the IPTF (International Police Task Force) at Bosnia-Herzegovina
- United Nations Peace Medal 1999 for working in the IPTF(International Police Task Force) at Bosnia-Herzegovina
- Aantarik Suraksha Medal (Internal Security Medal) by MHA Govt of India
- DG's Commendation Disc by DG CISF

During his IPS training at the Sardar Vallabhbhai Patel National Police Academy, he won:

- Maharaja of Tonk Cup (Best Horse Rider)
- R.D. Singh Cup (Best Swimmer)

== Works ==
- Anjani Kumar is the co-author of and supervised the production of the coffee table book, Journey of the Hyderabad City Police with Noopur Kumar. Anjani Kumar was Additional Commissioner of Police, Law and Order, Hyderabad City during the time of the publication of the book.

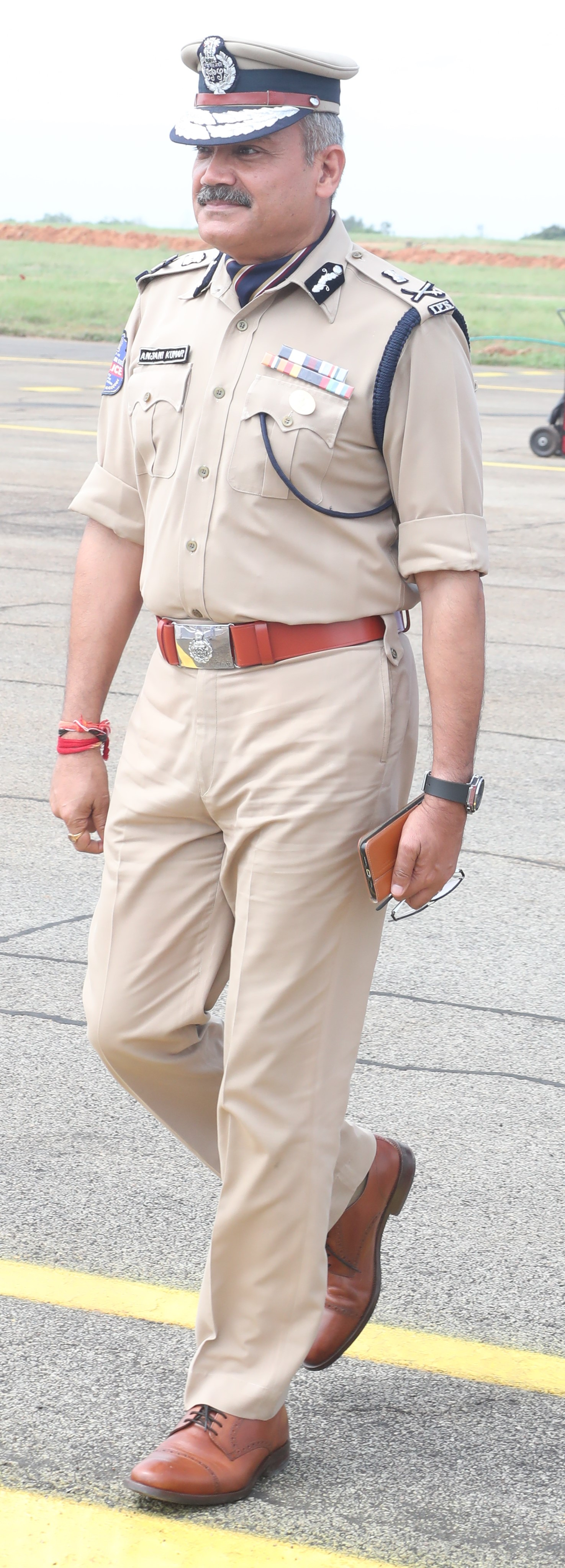
Anjani Kumar, IPS

Police appointments
Preceded by V. V. Srinivasa Rao	Commissioner of Police, Hyderabad City; 2018 - 2021	Succeeded by C. V. Anand
Preceded by M. Mahender Reddy	Director General of Police, Telangana; 2022 - 2023	Succeeded by Ravi Gupta
