= Khammam Police Commissionerate =

City police in Telangana, India

- Common name: Khammam City Police

Agency overview
- Formed: 2016
- Employees: Commissioner of Police; Deputy commissioner Additional Deputy Commissioners; Police Inspectors; Assistant Police Inspectors; Sub Inspectors

Jurisdictional structure
- Operations jurisdiction: India
- Governing body: Government of Telangana
- General nature: Local civilian police

Operational structure
- Headquarters: Khammam, Telangana
- Agency executive: Vishnu S Warrier IPS, Commissioner of Police
- Parent agency: Telangana State Police

Khammam Police Commissionerate is a city police force with primary responsibilities in law enforcement and investigation within Khammam area.
