= Damodar Goutam Sawang =

Indian police officer

Damodar Goutam Sawang IPS
- Born: Damodar Gautam Sawang; 10 July 1963 (age 63); Arunachal Pradesh
- Education: B. A.
- Police career
- Country: India
- Service years: Indian Police Service, 1986-present
- Badge no.: 19861086
- Awards: 2002, Police Medal for Meritorious Service; 2003, Police Medal for Gallantry; 2005, CRPF Director General's Commendation Disc; 2015, President's Police Medal for Distinguished Service

Damodar Gautam Sawang is a former Indian police officer. He is a former chairman of Andhra Pradesh Public Service Commission and former Director General of Police, Andhra Pradesh.

Sawang served as the Director General of Police, Andhra Pradesh from 31 May 2019 to 15 February 2022.

Sawang is a Regular Recruit of the Indian Police Service belonging to the 1986 batch and allocated to the Andhra Pradesh Police cadre. After the bifurcation of Andhra Pradesh, Sawang was retained in the residual Andhra Pradesh State.

Many police officers have been groomed by Sawang during his posting in Warangal, including Stephen Raveendra.

Police appointments
Preceded by A.R. Anuradha	Director General of Vigilance and Enforcement Department, Vijayawada City	Succeeded by Incumbent
Preceded by A. B. Venkateswara Rao	Commissioner of Police, Vijayawada	Succeeded by Dwaraka Thirumalarao
Preceded by Aruna Bahuguna	Additional Director General of Police, Andhra Pradesh Special Police	Succeeded by
Preceded by	Commissioner, UN Police, United Nations Mission in Liberia	Succeeded by
Preceded by	Inspector General of Police (Law and Order), Andhra Pradesh Police	Succeeded by
Preceded by	Deputy Inspector General of Police, Central Reserve Police Force	Succeeded by
Preceded by	Deputy Inspector General of Police, APSP Battalion, Kurnool	Succeeded by
Preceded by T. A. Tripathi	Deputy Inspector General of Police, Special Intelligence Branch	Succeeded by J. Purnachandra Rao
Preceded by	Deputy Inspector General of Police, Warangal Range, Andhra Pradesh Police	Succeeded by
Preceded by	Deputy Inspector General of Police, Home Guards, Andhra Pradesh Police	Succeeded by
Preceded by D. T. Naik; 25.8.1990-24.7.1991	Superintendent of Police, Warangal District	Succeeded by Sudeep Lakhtakia; 13.6.1994-3.2.1996
