= V. C. Sajjanar =

Indian police officer

V. C. Sajjanar IPS
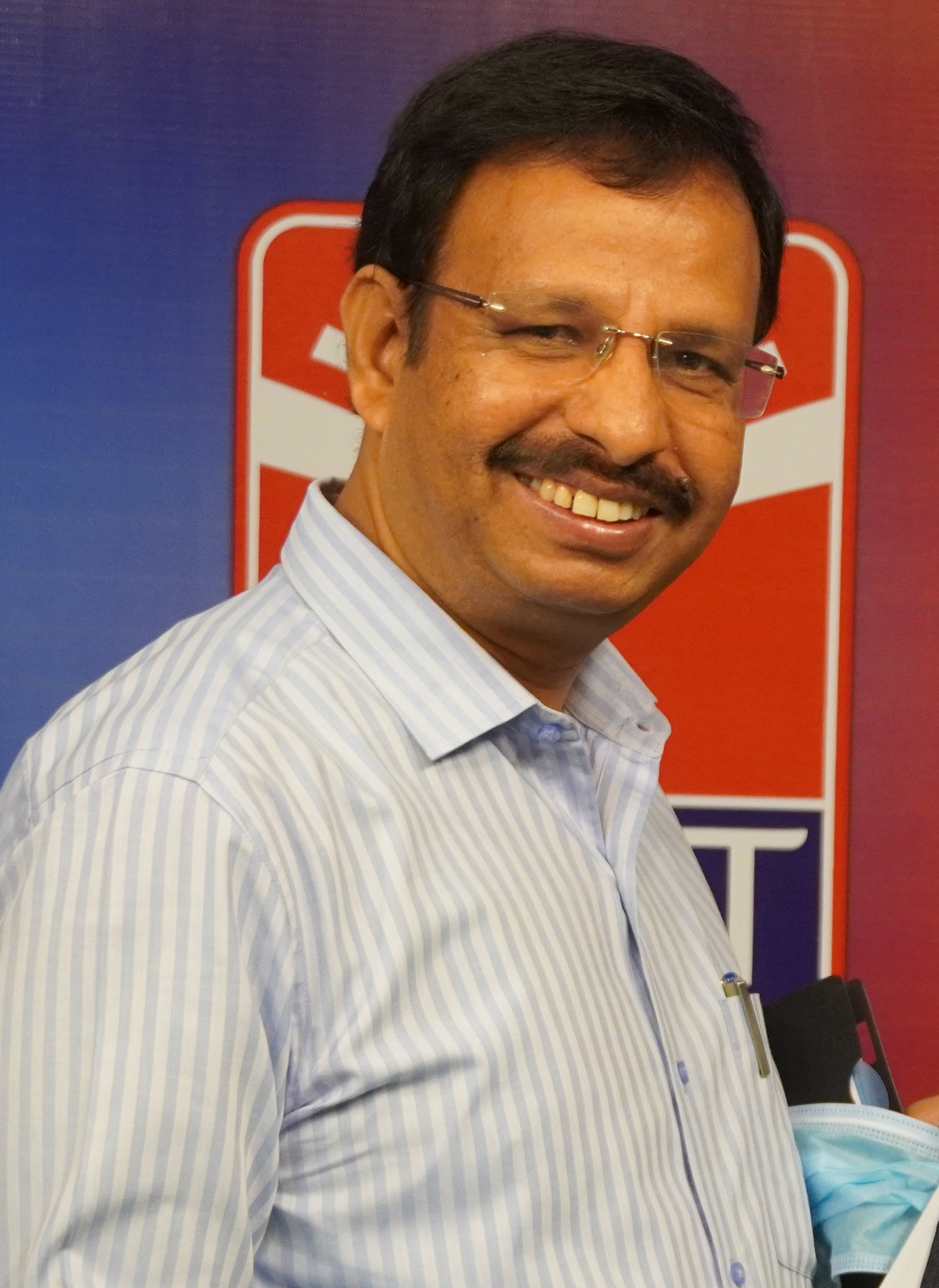

Commissioner Hyderabad City Police
- Incumbent
- Assumed office 30 September 2025
- In office 25 August 2021 – 29 September 2025
- Preceded by: Sandeep Shandilya

Additional Director General of Police
- In office 11 March 2021 – 27 September 2025

Personal details
- Born: 24 October 1968 (age 58) Hubli, Mysore State (present–day Karnataka), India
- Spouse: Anupa Sajjanar
- Parents: Channappa B. Sajjanar (father); Girija Sajjanar (mother)
- Education: Lions English Medium School, Hubballi
- Alma mater: Karnatak University, Dharwad
- Occupation: Police

Vishwanath Channappa Sajjanar (born 24 October 1968) is an Indian police officer who was the director general of police (DGP) of Telangana, now serving as Commissioner of the Hyderabad City Police. He is native of Hubballi, Karnataka state. Sajjanar is known to focus on women and child safety issues. He is also known for his strong focus on community and citizen friendly policing, cybercrime and human trafficking. Sajjanar began his career as an Assistant Superintendent of Police of Jangaon (Warangal District). He also served as the Inspector General of Police (Special Intelligence).

== Early life ==
Vishwanath Channappa Sajjanar is a native of Hubballi, Dharwad district, Karnataka state, India. His parents are Channappa and Girija. He was born on 24 October 1968. He did his early education from Lions English Medium School, Hubballi and obtained B.Com degree from J.G.College of Commerce, Hubli, which is affiliated to Karnatak University, Dharwad. V.C. Sajjanar did M.B.A. from Kousali Institute of Management Studies, Dharwad and joined I.P.S. in 1996, after successfully clearing civil services examination conducted by Union Public Services Commission of India (U.P.S.C).

== 2008 Warangal Acid Attack ==
In 2008, two female engineering students in Warangal were attacked by three male suspects. The suspects were shot by the Warangal police, who acted in self-defense against an unprovoked attack by the accused. V.C. Sajjanar, was the Superintendent of Police for Warangal district at the time of the incident.

== 2019 Hyderabad Gang Rape ==
On 6 December, Sajjanar announced that the four accused in the 2019 Hyderabad gangrape-murder case were shot in self-defence by the Cyberabad Police.

== 2021 Promoted as Additional DGP ==
On 11 March 2021, Sajjanar was promoted to the rank of Addl. DGP. On 25 August 2021, Sajjanar was transferred From Police Commissioner of Cyberabad to take a new position as managing director of Telangana State Road Transport Corporation.

== 2025 Hyderabad Police Commissioner ==
Sajjanar was appointed as Hyderabad Police Commissioner on 27 September 2025 and assumed charge on September 30.

== See also ==
- Commissioner of Police- India
- Indian Police Service

Police appointments
Preceded by Sandeep Sandilya	Commissioner of Police, Cyberabad; 2018 - 2021	Succeeded by Stephen Raveendra
Preceded by Stephen Raveendra	Managing Director, Telangana State Road Transport Corporation; 2021 - 2025	Succeeded by Y. Nagi Reddy
Preceded by C. V. Anand	Commissioner of Police, Hyderabad City; 2024 - 2025	Incumbent
