= Shikha Goel =

Indian Police Services officer

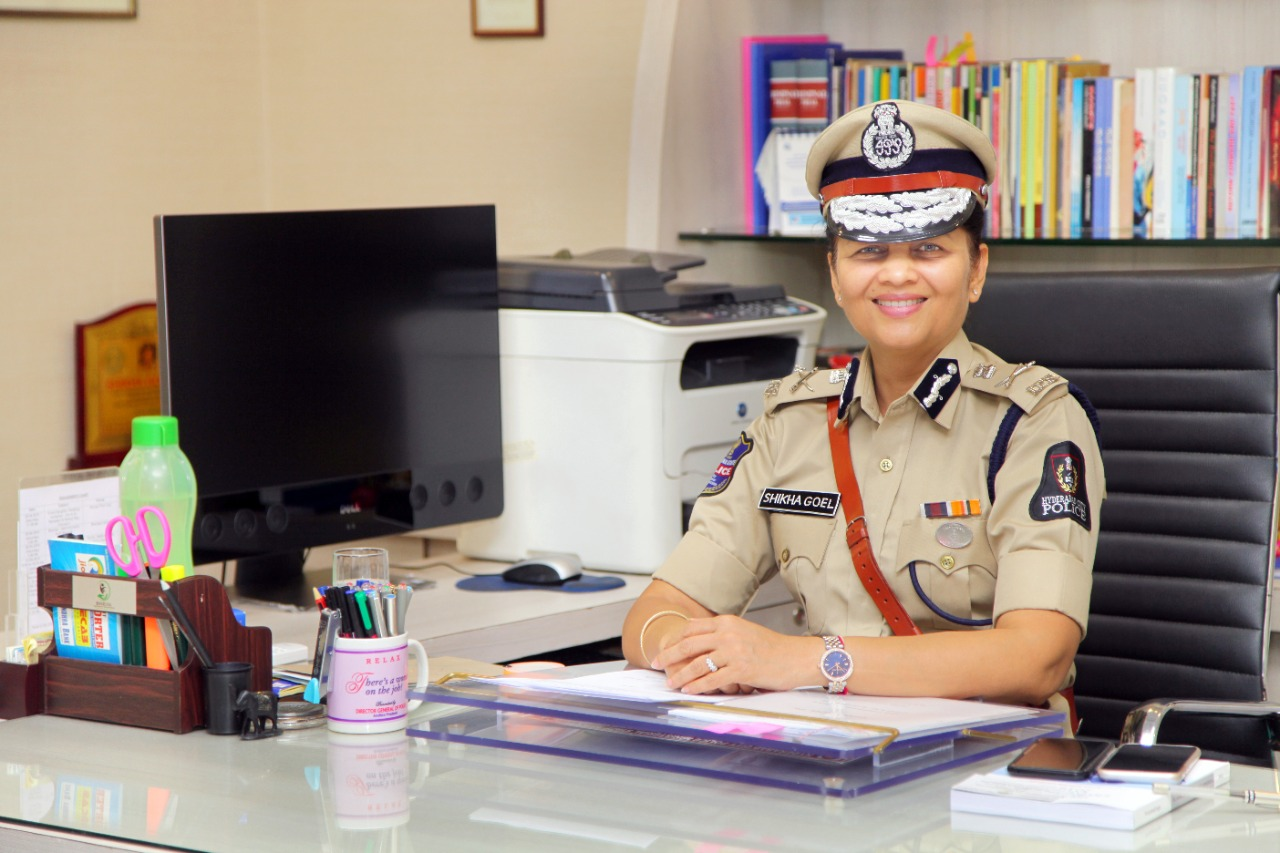

Personal details
- Born: 7 March 1969 (age 57)
- Education: Delhi University; Miranda House; Indian School of Business
- Occupation: IPS officer
- Awards: President's Police Medal for Distinguished Service; Police Medal for Meritorious Service
- Police career
- Department: Telangana Police, CID, Women Safety, Cyber security
- Service years: 1994-Present
- Rank: Director general of police

Shikha Goel (born 7 March 1969) is an IPS officer of the 1994 batch from the Telangana cadre.

She is the incumbent director general of police (DGP), CID, of Telangana State. and director general of police, women safety, SHE teams and Bharosa;

She is also the director of Telangana Cyber Security Bureau and director of Telangana Forensic Science Laboratory.

Shikha Goel is the recipient of President's Police Medal for Distinguished Service and Police Medal for Meritorious Service.

== Early life and education ==
Shikha Goel was born on March 7, 1969. She completed her higher education at Delhi University, earning a bachelor's degree with Honours in botany from Miranda House, followed by a master's degree and an M. Phil in botany. She also completed an Advanced Management Programme in public policy from the Indian School of Business and is an accredited civil and commercial mediator through ADR ODR International, England.

== Career ==
Shikha Goel began her career in the Indian Police Service in 1995 after completing her training at the Sardar Vallabhbhai Patel National Police Academy, Hyderabad. She first joined in Jammu and Kashmir Police serving as an assistant superintendent of police. After serving few years in Jammu & Kashmir, she was transferred to Andhra Pradesh Police. She joined there in 1999 and served in various positions. She joined as additional director general of police (ADGP), CID, of Telangana State in 2023.

She also served as director, Anti-Corruption Bureau, Telangana State; FAC director of the Telangana State Cyber Security Bureau; in-charge director of the forensic science laboratory (FSL); in-charge additional director general of police, Women Safety Wing; additional commissioner of police, crimes & SIT, Hyderabad; inspector general of police, CISF NS Headquarters, New Delhi; deputy commissioner of police, North Zone, Secunderabad; and superintendent of police in various districts/units.

== Decorations ==
- President's Police Medal for distinguished service – Received in 2021
- Police Medal for meritorious service – Received in 2011
