= B. Shivadhar Reddy =

Indian Police Service officer

- Education: University College of Law, Osmania University
- Police career
- Country: Indian Police Service
- Department: Director General of Police, HoPF, Former Intelligence Chief, Telangana State - 2014-2016 and 2023-present
- Branch: Intelligence Department
- Service years: 1994-2026
- Rank: Director General of Police
- Awards: President Police Medal for Distinguished Service in 2020; Police Medal for Gallantry in 2002

Battula Shivadhar Reddy(born 1966) is a retired 1994-Batch Indian Police Service officer (IPS), from Ranga Reddy district in Telangana State. On 26 September 2025, he was appointed Director General of Police of Telangana and served their till 30 April 2026.

== Biography ==
Reddy was born in Hyderabad and graduated in LL.B. from Osmania University, Hyderabad. After practising as an advocate for some time, he qualified in the Civil Services Examination 1994 and was allotted to the erstwhile State of Andhra Pradesh. After the bifurcation of Andhra Pradesh, he was allotted to the State of Telangana. He is presently holding the rank of Director General of Police, heading the Intelligence Department of Telangana. Prior to this, Reddy served in various positions at the district and state level.

Reddy worked in different wings of the Police Department including traffic, intelligence, anti-corruption, personnel management and police administration. In the initial days of his service, he worked as Assistant Superintendent of Police (ASP) in Anakapalli, Narsipatnam and Chintapalli Sub-Divisions, all in Visakhapatnam district, Andhra Pradesh. On promotion as Additional Superintendent of Police, he served in the Greyhounds as Squadron Commander, and Additional Superintendent of Police, Bellampalli in Adilabad district. After attaining promotion, he served as the Superintendent of Police of Nalgonda, Srikakulam, Nellore and Guntur districts from 2000 to 2007. He also worked as Deputy Commissioner of Police (DCP) Traffic, Hyderabad City, Deputy Commissioner of Police, South Zone, and Superintendent of Police, Special Intelligence Branch (SIB). He was deputed to the United Nations, and in 2003 served in the United Nations Mission in Kosovo (UNMIK).

He was transferred as Deputy Commissioner of Police, South Zone, Hyderabad City in June 2007, after the blast in Mecca Masjid and subsequent police firing that occurred in May, 2007, in which 14 people died and 68 persons injured. All important festivals in South Zone of Hyderabad City, passed off peacefully.

In Visakhapatnam in 2016, Reddy worked with hoteliers on implementing proper security using CCTV cameras and related security measures to reduce crime.

As Deputy Inspector General of Police (IGP), Reddy served as Chief of Special Intelligence Branch (SIB) and Additional Director, Anti-Corruption Bureau (ACB), Andhra Pradesh. On promotion as Inspector General, he served as Director, ACB, and later appointed as Commissioner of Police, Visakhapatnam City, Andhra Pradesh. After the formation of the State of Telangana in 2014, he was selected by the newly formed Telangana Rashtra Samithi government to be the first Chief of Intelligence Department, in the rank of IGP.

In 2021, Reddy launched "Arrive Alive", a campaign for safer roads, while serving as Commissioner of Police, Visakhapatnam, which aims to help in spreading safe road awareness among the public and reducing road accidents, and in 2016 he launched a public complaints box for police in Telangana.

Later, he was transferred as Inspector General of Police, Personnel Wing and continued in that position after his promotion as Additional Director General of Police (Addl DGP). In 2023, he was transferred to Railways and Road Safety wing.

In December 2023, he was chosen again by the newly formed Congress Government to head (Chief) the Intelligence Department in the rank of Additional Director General of Police.

The Government of Telangana continued Reddy as the Chief of Intelligence after his promotion as Director General of Police in August 2024.

Shivadhar Reddy was appointed as Director General of Police (DGP) on 26 September 2025.

== Awards and recognition ==
Reddy was awarded the Police Medal for Gallantry in 2002, the United Nations Medal in 2003, the Indian Police Medal for Meritorious Service in 2011, the Asadharan Aasuchana Kushalta Padak in 2018 for outstanding intelligence work, and the President Police Medal for Distinguished Service in 2020.

In June 2025 he received a Certificate of Excellence from the Minister of External Affairs at New Delhi, for his service in passport verification using Telangana police's app VeriFast.

Police appointments
Preceded by Jitender	Director General of Police, Telangana; 2025 - 2026	Succeeded by C. V. Anand
