= Malkajgiri Police Commissionerate =

One of the three Police commissionerates in Hyderabad, Telangana, India

- Motto: With You For You

Agency overview
- Formed: 2026
- Preceding agencies: cyberabad commissionerate; Rachakonda Police Commissionerate

Jurisdictional structure
- Operations jurisdiction: Malkajgiri zone, L.B.Nagar Zone, Telangana, India
- Legal jurisdiction: Medchal–Malkajgiri district, and Rangareddy District

Operational structure
- Headquarters: Neredmet, Medchal–Malkajgiri district, Telangana
- Agency executive: G. Sudheer Babu, IPS, Commissioner of Police
- Parent agency: Telangana State Police

Website
- http://rachakondapolice.telangana.gov.in/

Malkajgiri Police Commissionerate is one among the three Police commissionerates located in Hyderabad, Telangana, India.

== History ==
After the formation of Telangana state, the government undertook major reforms in policing to enhance public service. It was recognized that the Cyberabad Metropolitan Police was too large—being the second largest in India after Delhi—causing difficulties in efficient policing.

To improve service delivery, the government issued G.O. Ms. No. 126, Home (Legal), dated 23 June 2016, dividing the Cyberabad Commissionerate into Cyberabad West and Cyberabad East, with a clear listing of police stations under each.

Subsequently, through G.O. Ms. No. 158, Home (Legal), dated 22 September 2016, Cyberabad East was renamed as Rachakonda Police Commissionerate. This change was also officially published in the state gazette. Since then, the area formerly known as Cyberabad East has been administered as the Rachakonda Commissionerate.

== Current Structure ==
Currently Rachakonda Police Commissionerate has three DCP zones.

=== Malkajgiri DCP Zone ===
==== Malkajgiri ACP Division ====
- Malkajgiri
- Nacharam
- Uppal
- Medipally
- Ghatkesar
- Pocharam IT Corridor
- Women PS, Uppal

==== Kushaiguda ACP Division ====
- Kushaiguda
- Cherlapally
- Neredmet
- Jawahar Nagar
- Keesara

=== LB Nagar DCP Zone ===
==== LB Nagar ACP Division ====
- LB Nagar
- Saroornagar
- Chaitanyapuri
- Nagole
- Women PS

==== Vanasthalipuram ACP Division ====
- Vanasthalipuram
- Hayathnagar
- Meerpet
- Abdullapurmet

==== Ibrahimpatnam ACP Division ====
- Ibrahimpatnam
- Manchal
- Yacharam
- Kandukur
- Maheshwaram
- Adibatla
- Madgul

== Police Commissioners ==
Rachakonda Police Commissioners
Sl. No.	Name of Police Chief	Batch	Tenure	Domicile
1	Sri M. M. Bhagwat, IPS	1996 (RR)	28-6-2016 to 30-12-2022	Maharashtra
2	Sri D. S. Chauhan, IPS	1997 (RR)	30-12-2022 to 13-12-2023	Uttar Pradesh
3	Sri G. Sudheer Babu, IPS	2001 (SPS)	13-12-2023 to 11-2-2024	Telangana
4	Dr. Tarun Joshi, IPS	2004 (RR)	11-2-2024 to 10-07-2024	New Delhi
5	Sri G. Sudheer Babu, IPS	2001 (SPS)	10-07-2024 to 31-12-2025	Telangana

== Sources ==
- Cyberabad East police renamed as Rachakonda commissionerate
- Cyberabad police commissionerate divided into East and West
- Over 3K CCTVs to be put up in Rachakonda Commissionerate
- Anit-Trafficking Unit inaugurated at Rachakonda Commissionerate
