= Karimnagar Police Commissionerate =

- Common name: Karimnagar City Police

Agency overview
- Employees: Commissioner of Police; Deputy commissioner Additional Deputy Commissioners; Police Inspectors; Assistant Police Inspectors; Sub Inspectors

Jurisdictional structure
- Operations jurisdiction: India
- Governing body: Government of Telangana
- General nature: Local civilian police

Operational structure
- Headquarters: Karimnagar, Telangana, India
- Agency executive: GAUSH ALAM I.P.S, Commissioner of Police
- Parent agency: Telangana State Police

Karimnagar Police Commissionerate is a city police force with primary responsibilities in law enforcement and investigation within Karimnagar area.
