= Cyberabad Metropolitan Police =

Police force in Telangana, India

Cyberabad Police Commissionerate
- Motto: Your Safety Our Concern

Agency overview
- Formed: 2003

Jurisdictional structure
- Operations jurisdiction: Cyberabad, Telangana, India
- Legal jurisdiction: Rangareddy District

Operational structure
- Headquarters: Gachibowli, Hyderabad, Rangareddy District, Telangana
- Agency executive: Dr. M Ramesh, IPS, Commissioner of Police
- Parent agency: Telangana Police

Website
- Official website

Cyberabad Police Commissionerate is the police commissionerate located in Gachibowli, Rangareddy district, Telangana, India. It was created in 2003 by bifurcating Rangareddy District Police.

== Current structure ==
Currently the Cyberabad Metropolitan Police has 5 DCP zones.

=== Rajendranagar DCP Zone ===
- Chevella ACP Division
  - Chevella Police Station
  - Shabad Police Station
  - Moinabad Police Station
- Rajendranagar ACP Division
  - Rajendranagar Police Station
  - Mailardevpally Police Station
  - Attapur Police Station
- Narsingi ACP Division
  - Shankarpally Police Station
  - Narsingi Police Station
  - Mokila Police Station

=== Madhapur DCP Zone ===
- Madhapur ACP Division
  - Madhapur Police Station
  - Raidurgam Police Station
  - Gachibowli Police Station
  - Women Police Station
- Miyapur ACP Division
  - Chandanagar Police Station
  - Miyapur Police Station
  - RC Puram Police Station
  - Kolluru Police Station (New)

=== Balanagar DCP Zone ===
- Balanagar ACP Division
  - Balanagar Police Station
  - Sanath nagar Police Station
  - Jeedimetla Police Station
  - Jagadgirigutta Police Station
- Kukatpally ACP Division
  - Kukatpally Police Station
  - KPHB Colony Police Station
  - Bachupally Police Station
  - Allapur (New)

=== Medchal DCP Zone (New) ===
- Medchal ACP Division (New)
  - Medchal Police Station
  - Dundigal Police Station
  - Suraram Police Station (New)
- Pet-basheerabad ACP Division
  - Pet-basheerabad Police Station
  - Shamirpet Police Station
  - Alwal Police Station
  - Genome Valley Police Station (New)

=== Shamshabad DCP Zone ===
- Shamshabad ACP Division
  - Shamshabad Police Station
  - RGI Airport Police Station
  - Kothur Police Station
  - Nandigama Police Station

Shadnagar ACP Division

- Shadnagar Police Station
- Shadnagar Rural Circle
  - Keshampet Police Station
  - Kondurg Police Station
  - Chowdariguda Police Station
- Amangal Circle
  - Amangal Police Station
  - Talakondapally Police Station
  - Kadthal Police Station

== Traffic wing ==
- Rajendranagar Division
  - Chevella Traffic Police Station
  - Rajendranagar Traffic Police Station
  - Narsingi Traffic Police Station (New)
- Balanagar Division
  - Balanagar Traffic Police Station
  - Jeedimetla Traffic Police Station
  - Kukatpally Traffic Police Station
  - KPHB Traffic Police Station (New)
- Madhapur Division
  - Madhapur Traffic Police Station
  - Miyapur Traffic Police Station
  - Gachibowli Traffic Police Station
  - Raidurgam Traffic Police Station (New)
- Shamshabad Division
  - Shamshabad Traffic Police Station
  - Shadnagar Traffic Police Station
- Medchal Division
  - Medchal Traffic Police Station (New)
  - Alwal Traffic Police Station

== Police Commissioners ==
Cyberabad Police Commissioners
Sl. No.	Name of Police Chief	Batch	Tenure	Domicile
1	Dr. M. Mahender Reddy, IPS	1986 (RR)	11-2-2003 to 3-1-2007	Telangana
2	Sri S. Prabhakar Reddy, IPS	1986 (RR)	3-1-2007 to 17-5-2012	Telangana
3	Sri Ch. Dwaraka Tirumala Rao, IPS	1986 (RR)	17-5-2012 to 22-5-2013	Andhra Pradesh
4	Sri C. V. Anand, IPS	1992 (RR)	22-5-2013 to 28-6-2016	Telangana
5	Sri V. Naveen Chand, IPS	1996 (SPS)	28-6-2016 to 1-9-2016	Telangana
6	Sri Sandeep Sandilya, IPS	1993 (RR)	1-9-2016 to 14-3-2018	New Delhi
7	Sri V. C. Sajjanar, IPS	1996 (RR)	14-3-2018 to 25-8-2021	Karnataka
8	Sri M. Stephen Raveendra, IPS	1999 (RR)	25-8-2021 to 12-12-2023	Andhra Pradesh
9	Sri Avinash Mohanty, IPS	2005 (RR)	12-12-2023 to Present	Odisha

== Controversies ==
Cyberabad Police drew a lot of flak after the Supreme Court of India Enquiry Commission headed by Justice V. S. Sirpurkar declared that the encounter killing of the four accused persons in the 2019 Hyderabad gang rape was a planned cold blooded murder by Cyberabad Police officials.

== See also ==
- Future City Police Commissionerate
- Cyberabad Municipal Corporation
- Hyderabad City Police
- Telangana State Police Academy
