= Telangana Police =

Indian state police force

- Telangana Police Badge
- Common name: Telangana Police
- Abbreviation: TGP
- Motto: Duty, Honour, Compassion

Agency overview
- Formed: 2 June 2014 (12 years ago), Hyderabad
- Preceding agency: Andhra Pradesh State Police
- Employees: 1,00,000
- Annual budget: ₹10,187.72 crore (US$1.1 billion) (2025-26 est.)

Jurisdictional structure
- Operations jurisdiction: Telangana, India
- Telangana Police jurisdictional area
- Area: 114,840 square kilometres (44,340 sq mi)
- Population: 3,51,93,978
- Legal jurisdiction: Telangana, India
- Governing body: Government of Telangana
- General nature: Local civilian police

Operational structure
- Overseen by: Government of Telangana
- Headquarters: Saifabad, Hyderabad, Telangana -500004
- Elected officer responsible: Anumula Revanth Reddy, Chief minister of Telangana and Minister for Home
- Agency executive: C. V. Anand, IPS, Director General of Police (Head of Police Force), Telangana.
- Parent agency: Home Department, Government of Telangana
- Child agencies: Hyderabad City Police; Future City Police Commissionerate; Cyberabad Metropolitan Police; Malkajgiri Police Commissionerate; Ramagundam Police Commissionerate; Warangal Police Commissionerate; Nizamabad Police Commissionerate
- Law enforcements: State Police Head Quarters of Telangana.

Facilities
- Police Stations: 709
- Cars: Mahindra Bolero 5000, Toyota Innova Crysta ≈10,000 Tata Sumo 500
- Motorcycles: Hero Glamour 5000
- Jeeps: Rakshak Jeeps ≈5,000
- Animals: Dogs

Notables
- Anniversary: 2 June
- Awards: President's Police Medal; Indian Police Medal

Website
- www.tspolice.gov.in

The Telangana Police is the law enforcement agency for the state of Telangana in India. It has jurisdiction concurrent with the 33 revenue districts of the state. The police force was created from the remnants of the Andhra Pradesh Police after Telangana state was formed. It is headed by the Director general of police, C. V. Anand, IPS and headquartered in Hyderabad, Telangana.

== Structure and organization ==
=== State Police Headquarters ===
The Director General of Police functions from Police Directorate, located in the DGP headquarters in Hyderabad. The Director General of Police (DGP) is designated as the head of the department. He is assisted by a team of senior officers from the ranks of additional DG and IG of police to Assistant Inspector General of Police (AIG - a post equivalent in rank and status to the superintendent of police).

=== Districts ===
Each police district is either coterminous with the revenue district, or is located within a number of revenue districts. It is headed by a District Superintendent of Police (or simply called Superintendent of Police). Each district comprises two or more Sub-Divisions, several Circles and police stations.

=== Sub-divisions ===
Each Sub-division is headed by one police officer of the rank Deputy Superintendent of Police (Officers of Telangana Police Service are directly recruited officers or promoted from lower ranks) or an Assistant Superintendent of Police (Officers of Indian Police Service). The officer who heads a Sub-Division is known as S.D.P.O. resp. Sub Divisional Police Officer.

=== Circles ===
A Circle comprises several police stations. An inspector of police who heads a police circle is the Circle Inspector of Police or CI.

=== Stations ===
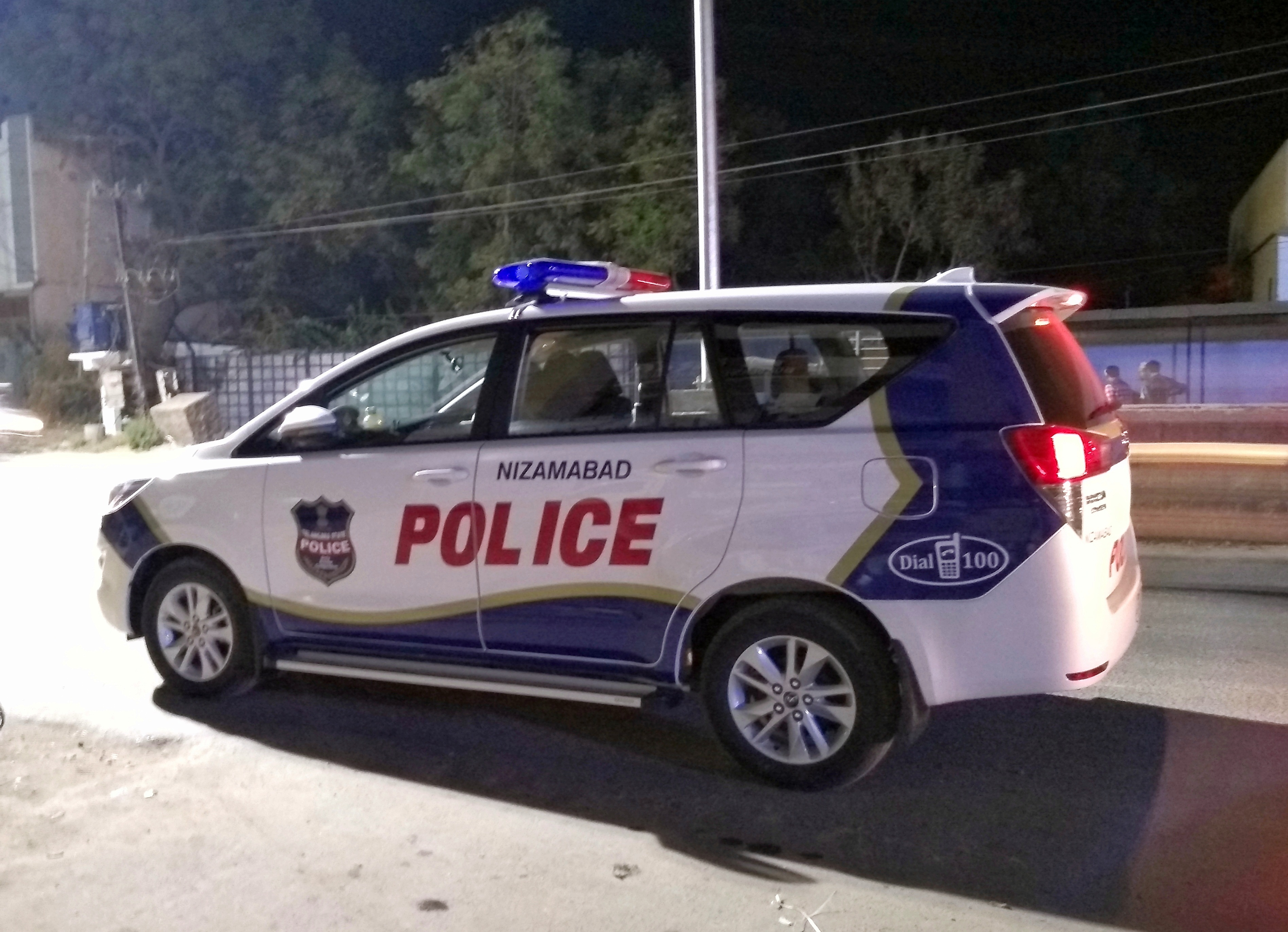
Telangana Police SUV

A police station is headed by an inspector (an upper subordinate rank). A police station is the basic unit of policing, responsible for prevention and detection of crime, maintenance of public order, enforcing law in general as well as for performing protection duties and making security arrangements for the constitutional authorities, government functionaries, representatives of the public in different legislative bodies and local self governments, public figures etc.

=== Commissionerate ===
A Police Commissionerate is a law enforcement body especially in the urban parts of the state. The commissionerate is headed by a Commissioner of Police. Hyderabad City Police, Cyberabad Metropolitan Police and Warangal Police Commissionerate are the local law enforcement agencies for the cities of Hyderabad and Warangal respectively.

Government of Telangana has issued ordinance for new commissionerates at Rachakonda commissionerate, Karimnagar, Khammam, Nizamabad, Ramagundam, and Siddipet.

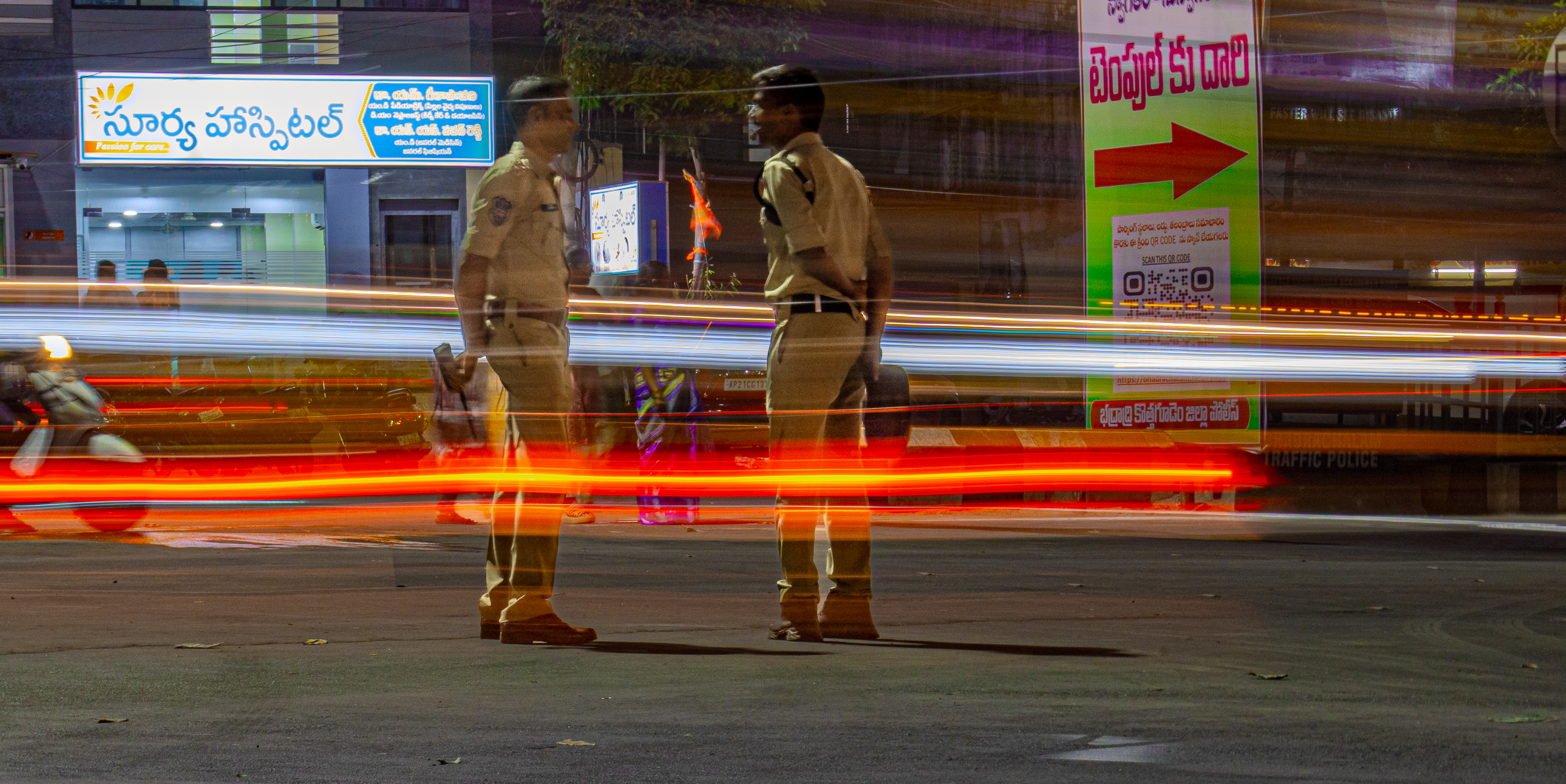
Telangana police at Bhadrachalam

== Police ranks ==
The Telangana State Police designates the following ranks:

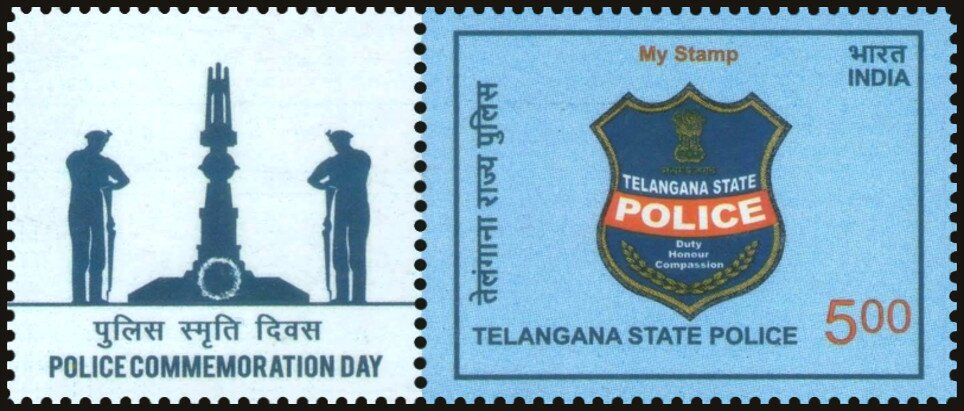
Stamp of India - 2017 - Colnect 909901 - Police Day - Telangana State Police

Higher Officers

- Director General of Police (DGP) (Head of Police Force)
- Additional Director General of Police (Addl.DGP)
- Inspector General of Police (IGP)
- Deputy Inspector General of Police (DIG)
- Superintendent of police (SP)
- Additional Superintendent of Police (Addl.SP)
- Deputy Superintendent of Police DSP/ Assistant Superintendent of Police (ASP)

Sub-ordinates

- Circle Inspector of Police (CI)
- Sub-Inspector of Police (SI)
- Assistant Sub-Inspector of Police (ASI)
- Head Police Constable (HPC)
- Police Constable (PC)
- Home Guard (HG)

== Telangana State Police Recruitment Board ==
The Telangana Level Police Recruitment Board (TGLPRB) is responsible for recruitment. TGLPRB is releasing recruitment notification time to time and conducting a written examination, Physical test, Medical test, and interviews for selecting best aspirants for their department and the department has about 80,000 active personnel in the State

== Insignia of Telangana Police (State Police) ==
Gazetted Officers

Indian Police Service cadre officers rank insignia
Insignia
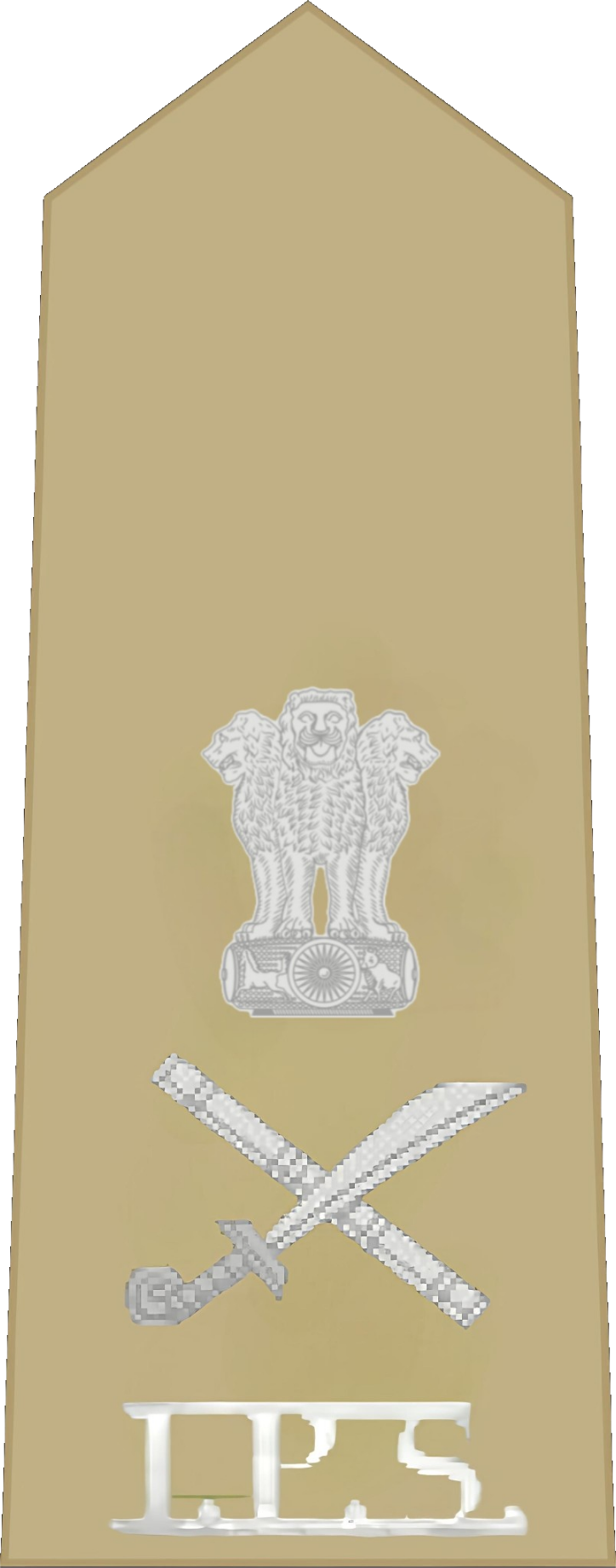
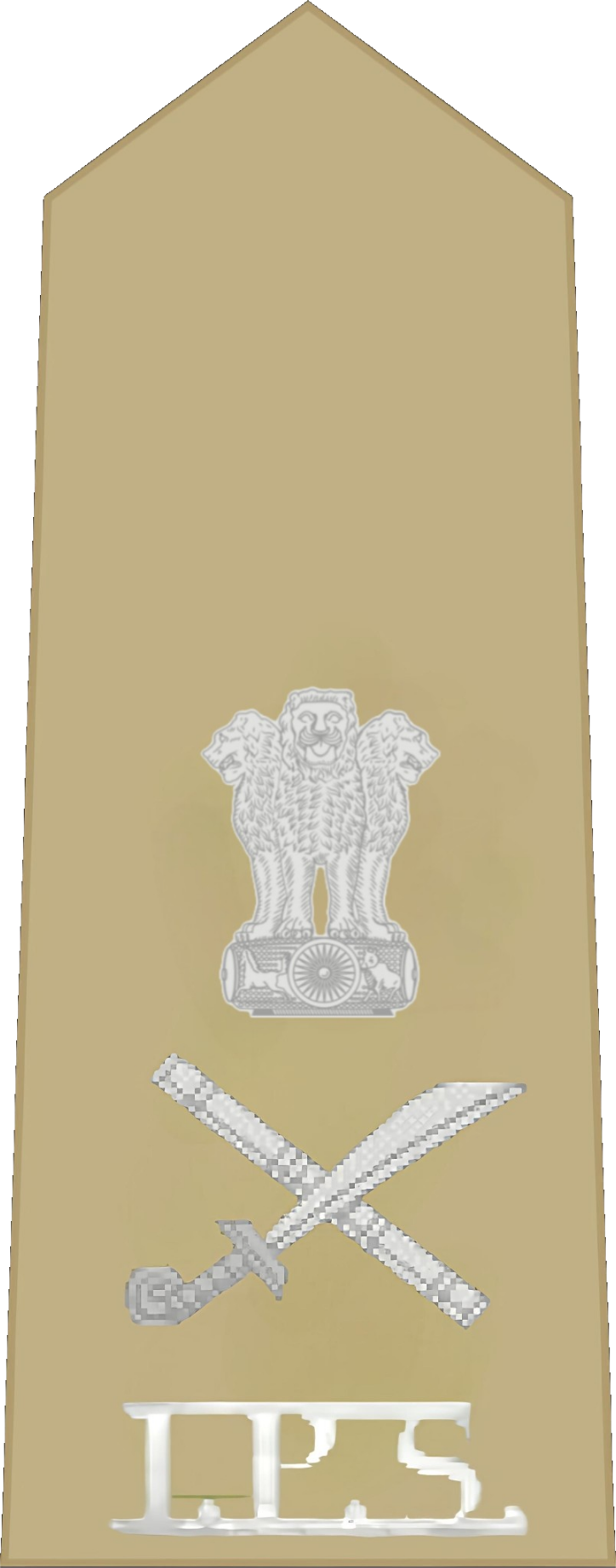
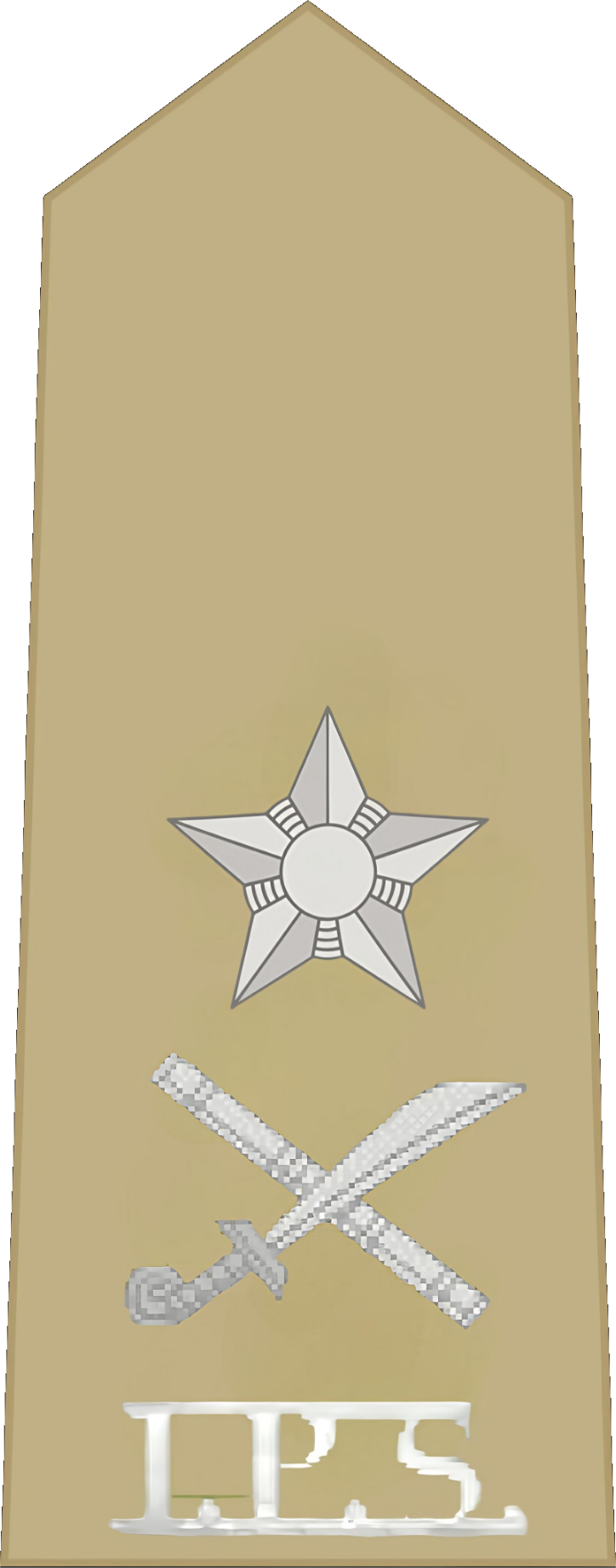
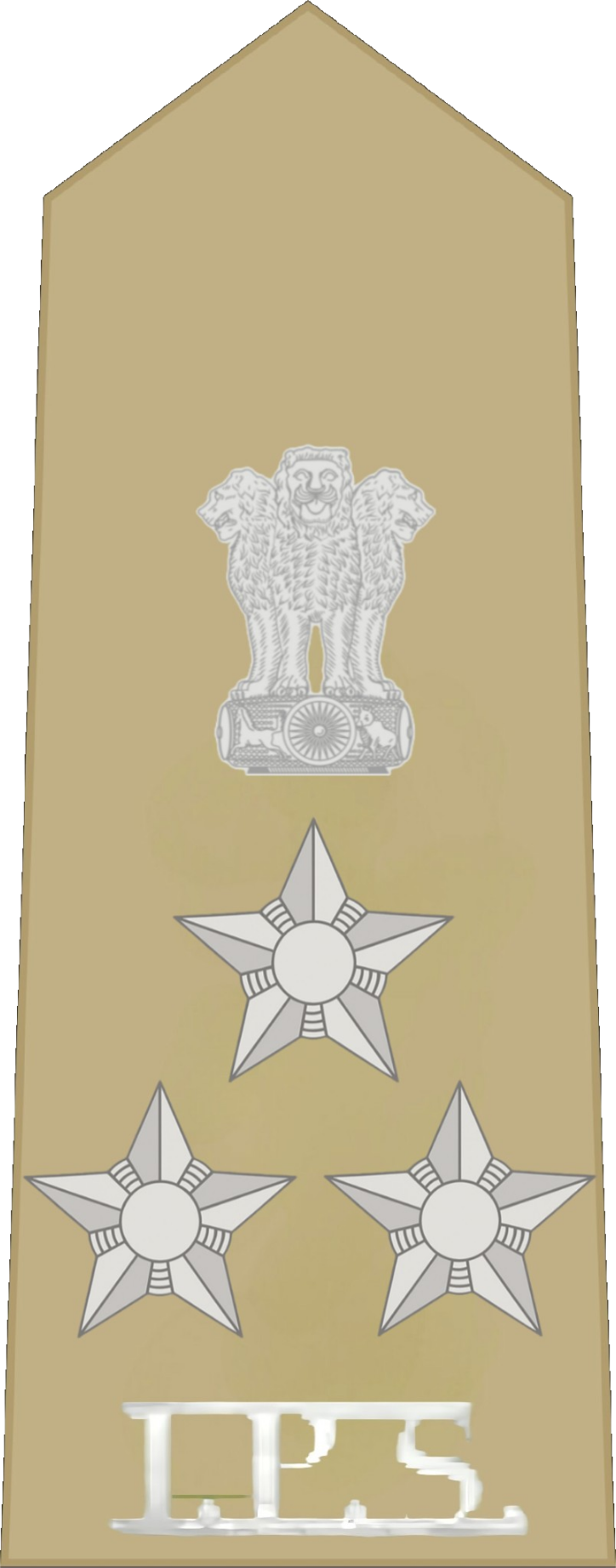
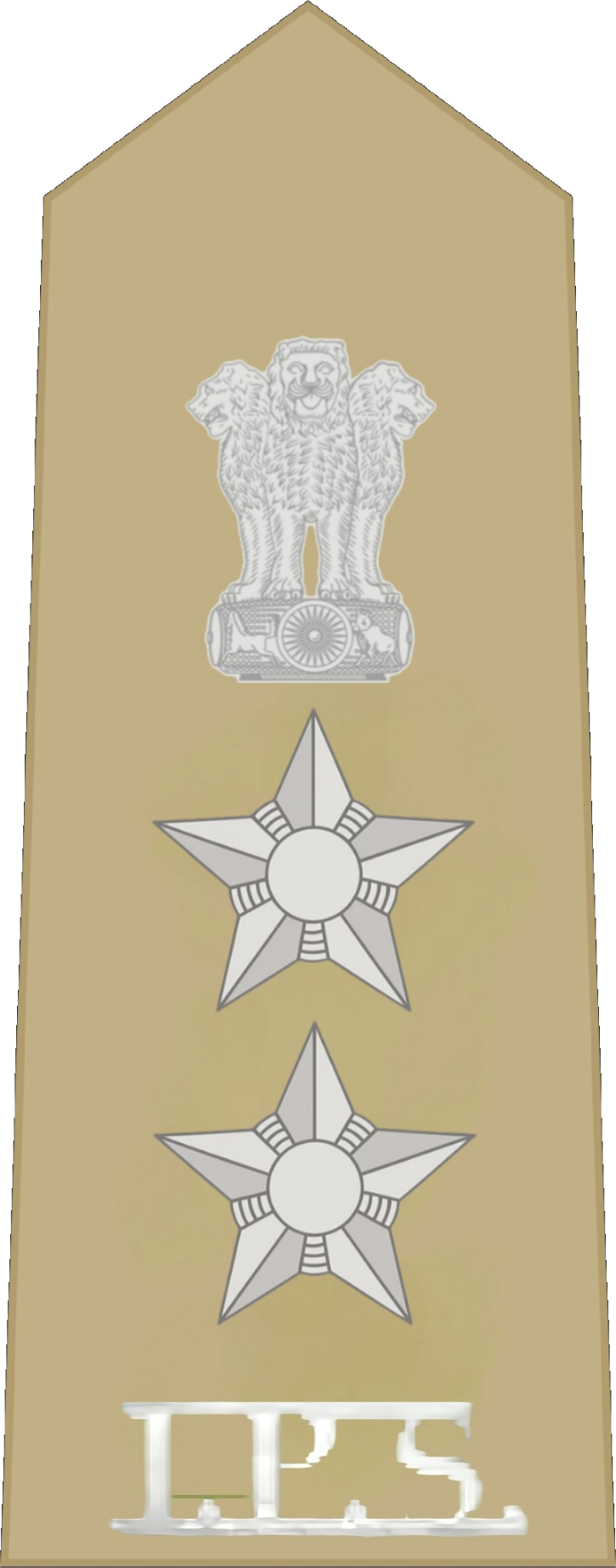
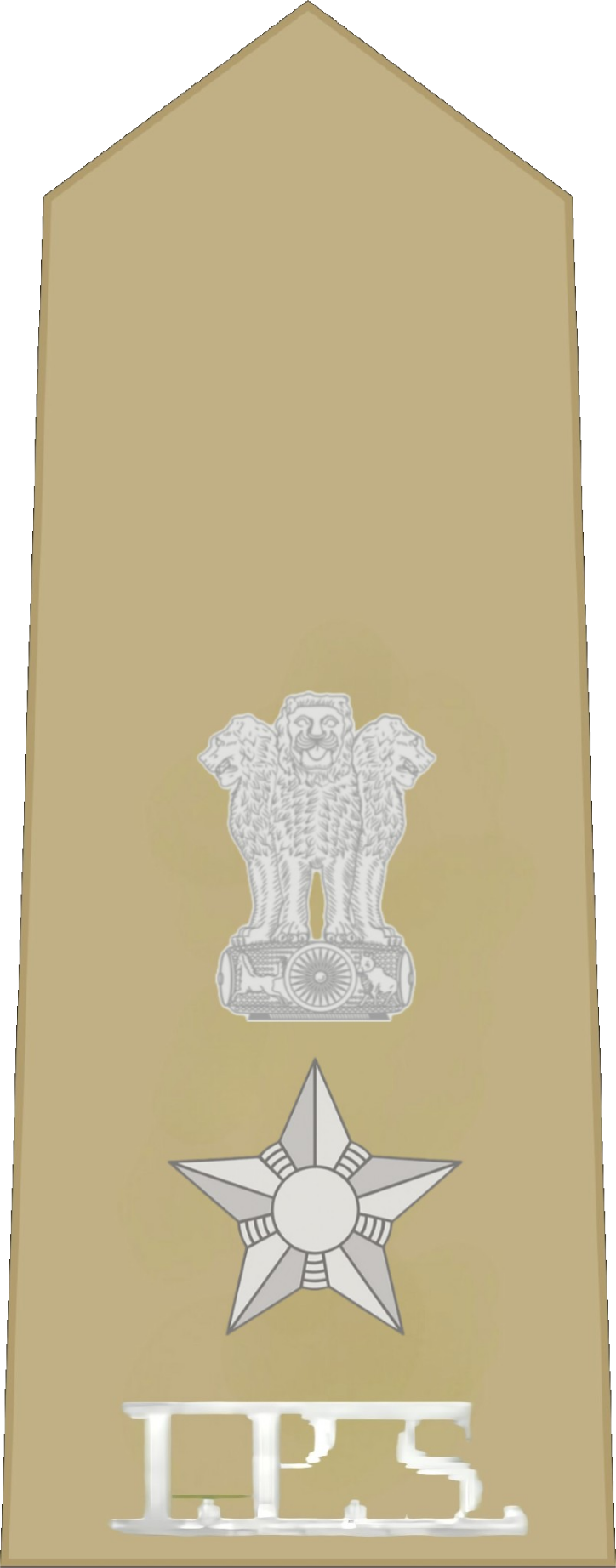
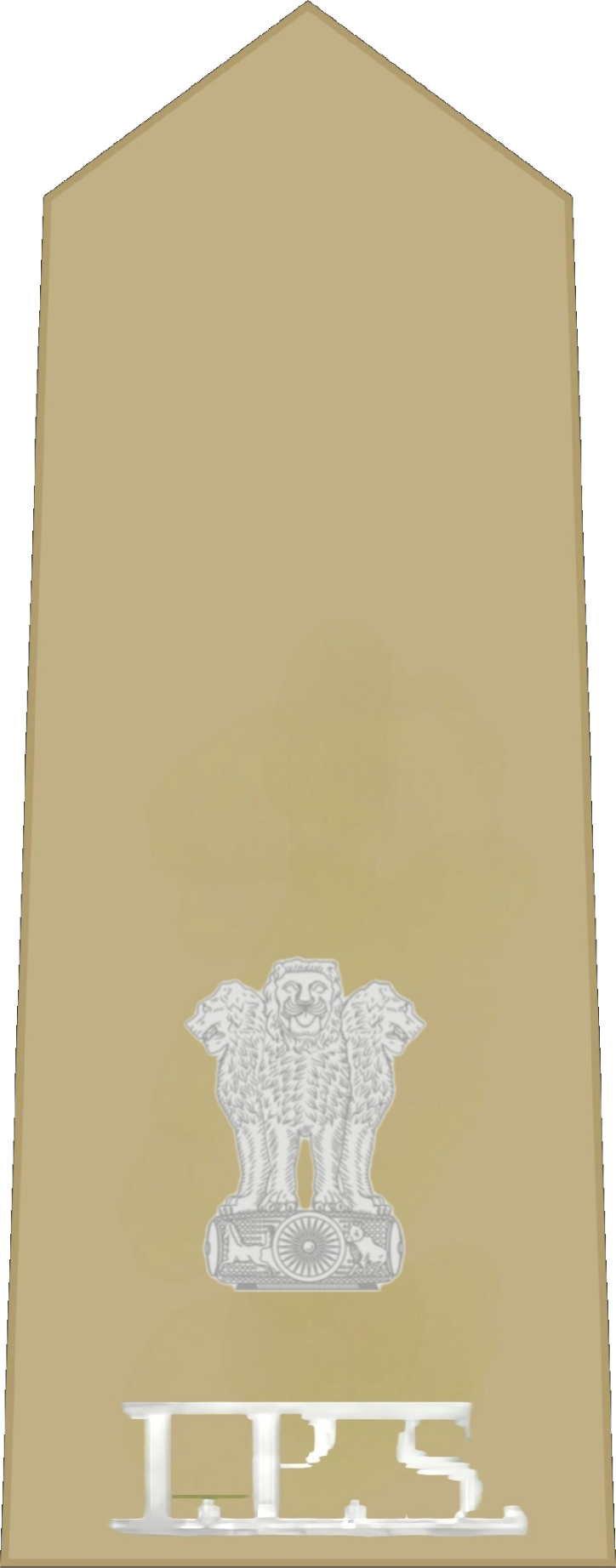
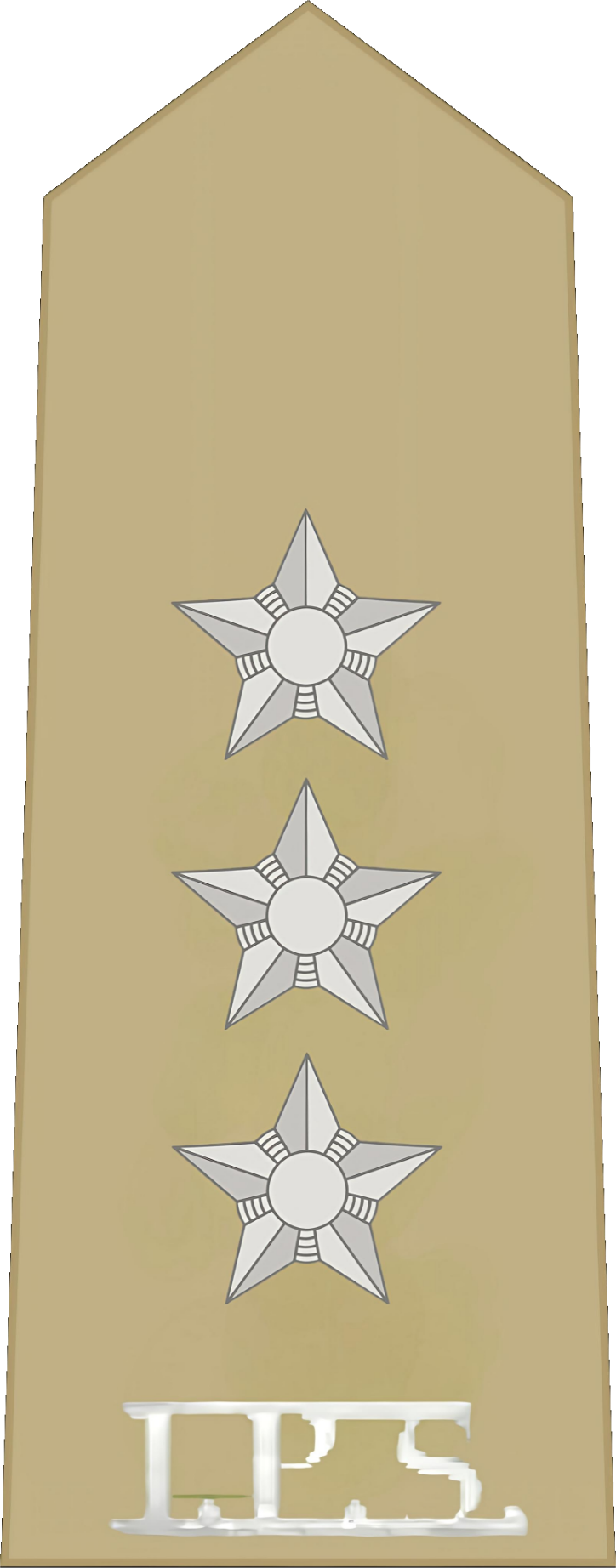
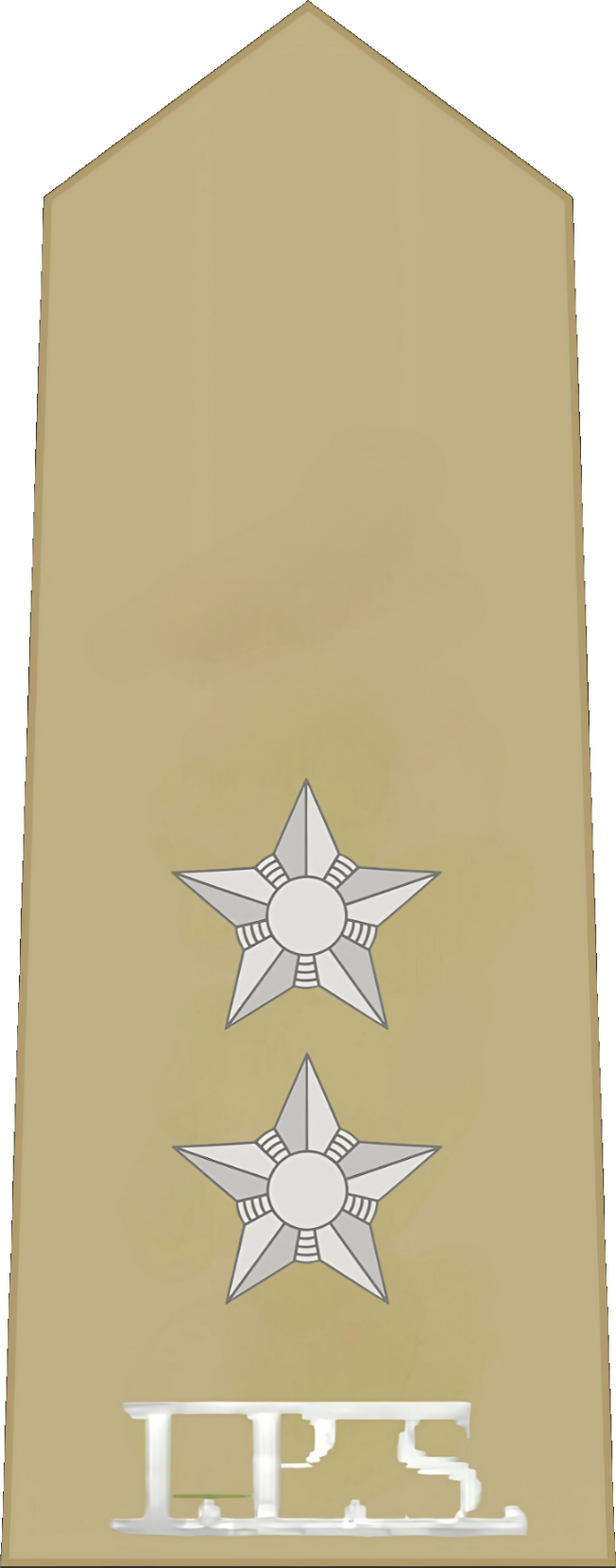
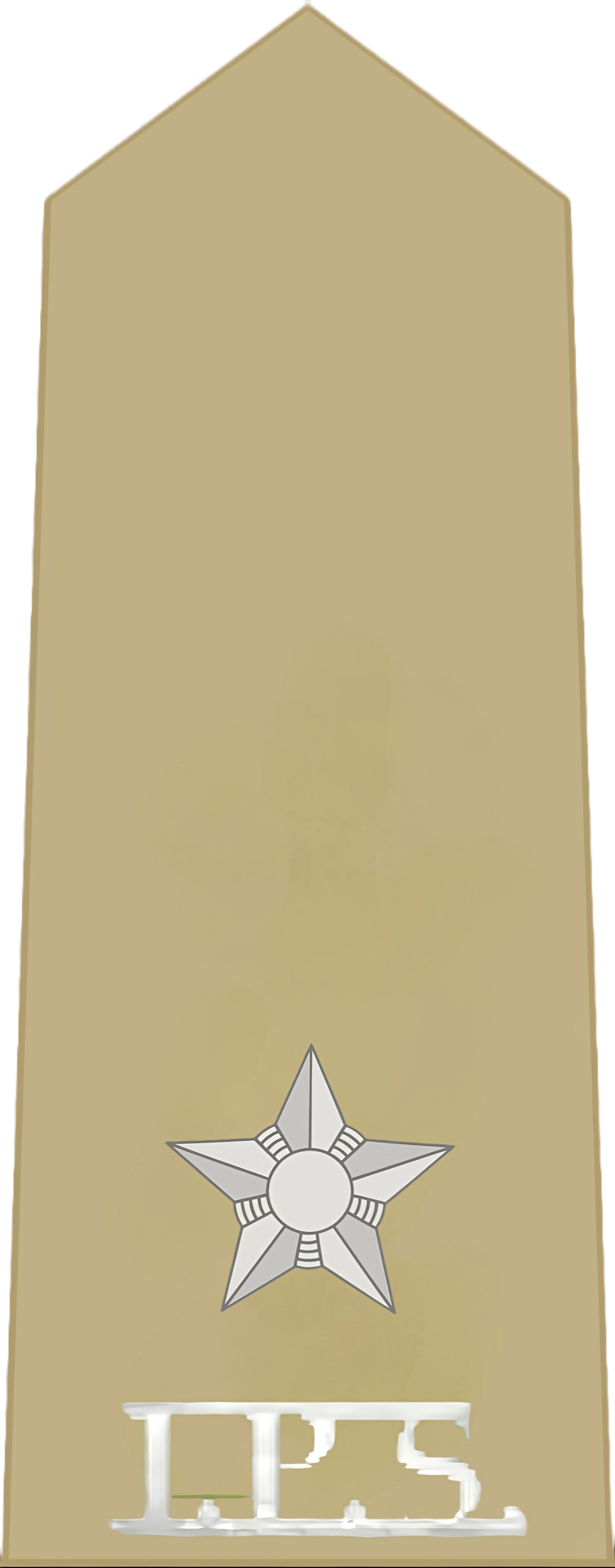
Rank
Director General of Police
Additional Director General of Police (Note: Rank insignia of DGP is similar to Additional DGP.)
Inspector General of Police
Deputy Inspector General of Police
Superintendent of Police (Selection Grade) (Note: The Senior Superintendent of Police (SSP) is a post, not a rank, typically held by an SP (selection grade or junior grade) in states like Uttar Pradesh, Jammu and Kashmir, and Punjab.)
Superintendent of Police
Additional superintendent of police
Assistant Superintendent of Police
Assistant superintendent of police (Probationary for two years)
Assistant Superintendent of Police (Probationary for one year)
Abbreviation
DGP
ADGP
IGP
DIGP
SP (SG)
SP
Addl.SP
ASP
ASP
ASP

- Note 1: The rank insignia of DGP, Spl.DGP, Addl.DGP is the same.
- Note 2: The equivalent rank to the ASP (Asst.SP) in State Police Services is the deputy superintendent of police (DSP/DySP).
- Note 3: The commissioner of police is a post typically held by DIG and above rank officers.

Non-gazetted officers

Indian Police non-gazetted officers rank insignia
Insignia
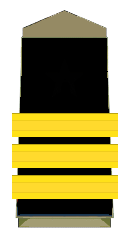
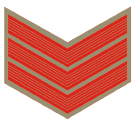
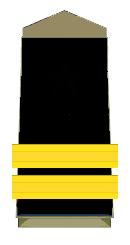
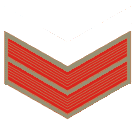
No insignia
Rank
Inspector of Police
Inspector / Circle Inspector (Note: Inspector or Circle Inspector with One Five-Pointed Star insignia exists in West Bengal Police.)
Assistant Police Inspector (Note: This rank exists only in the Maharashtra Police.)
Sub-Inspector
Sergeant (Kolkata Police)
Assistant Sub-Inspector
Head Constable (Note: Shoulder insignia rank only used in the Maharashtra Police.)
Senior Constable (Note: This rank is also known as senior constable, constable grade-I, and exists only in some state police forces.)
Police constable
Abbreviation
INSP
INSP / CO
API
SI
Sgt
ASI
HC
SC
PC

- The rank of Sergeant is used in India only in the Bihar Police and the Kolkata Police
- The One Five Pointed Star for the rank of Inspector is used by Police forces of 7 states viz. West Bengal, Jharkhand, Bihar, Sikkim, Assam, Nagaland and Tripura. This is because Inspectors of Police in these 7 states are Gazetted Officers. However, the Kolkata Police uses the Four Pointed Star of the Order of Bath for the ranks of Inspector and Assistant Commissioner of Police instead of Five Pointed Star. For the ranks of ASI, SI/Sergeant and Deputy Commissioner of Police, the usual Five Pointed Star is used
- Colour pattern and size of chevrons may vary according to the different rules of several distinct Indian State Police services.

== List of Directors General of Police ==
=== After bifurcation (2014-Present) ===
S.No	Name	Batch	Tenure
1	Sri Anurag Sharma, IPS	1982 (RR)	3-6-2014 to 12–11–2017
2	Dr. M. Mahender Reddy, IPS	1986 (RR)	12-11-2017 to 31–12–2022
3	Sri Anjani Kumar, IPS	1990 (RR)	31-12-2022 to 3–12–2023
4	Sri Ravi Gupta, IPS	1990 (RR)	3-12-2023 to 10–07–2024
5	Dr. Jitender, IPS	1992 (RR)	10-07-2024 to 26–09–2025
6	B. Shivadhar Reddy, IPS	1994 (RR)	26-09-2025 to 30–04–2026
7	C. V. Anand, IPS	1991 (RR)	01-05-2026 to present

=== Before bifurcation (1956–2014) ===
S.No	Name	Batch	Tenure
1	Sri A. K. K. Nambiar, IPS	1935 (SPS)	1-11-1956 to 2–8–1967
2	Sri Sivakumar Lal, IPS	1935 (SPS)	3-8-1967 to 6–10–1968
3	Sri Atma Jayaram, IPS	1942 (SPS)	7-10-1968 to 6–11–1971
4	Sri B. N Kalyan Rao, IPS	1943 (SPS)	7-11-1971 to 15–7–1973
5	Sri Abdus Salam Khan, IPS	1947 (SPS)	16-7-1973 to 30–4–1975
6	Sri K. Ramachandra Reddy, IPS	1944 (SPS)	1-5-1975 to 31–10–1978
7	Sri M. V. Narayana Rao, IPS	1948 (RR)	1-11-1978 to 31–3–1982
8	Sri S. Ananda Ram, IPS	1950 (RR)	1-4-1982 to 10–4–1983
9	Sri K. G. Erady, IPS	1952 (RR)	11-4-1983 to 21–8–1984
10	Sri M. Mahendar Reddy, IPS	1953 (RR)	22-8-1984 to 16–1–1985
11	Sri P. V. G. Krishnamacharyulu, IPS	1951 (RR)	17-1-1985 to 28–2–1986
12	Sri C. G. Saldanha, IPS	1953 (RR)	1-3-1986 to 31–3–1987
13	Sri P. S. Rammohan Rao, IPS	1956 (RR)	1-4-1987 to 9–2–1989
14	Sri Sushil Kumar, IPS	1955 (RR)	10-2-1989 to 23–4–1990
15	Sri R. Prabhakar Rao, IPS	1957 (RR)	24-4-1990 to 28–2–1992
16	Sri T. Suryanarayana Rao, IPS	1958 (RR)	1-3-1992 to 28–2–1994
17	Sri M. V. Bhaskar Rao, IPS	1962 (RR)	1-3-1994 to 16–12–1994
18	Sri R. K. Ragaala, IPS	1962 (RR)	16-12-1994 to 31–7–1995
19	Sri M. S. Raju, IPS	1962 (RR)	31-7-1995 to 30–11–1996
20	Sri H. J. Dora, IPS	1965 (RR)	30-11-1996 to 18–02–2002
21	Sri Pervaram Ramulu, IPS	1967 (RR)	18-02-2002 to 31–07–2003
22	Sri S. R. Sukumara, IPS	1967 (RR)	31-07-2003 to 31–12–2004
23	Sri Noel Swaranjit Sen, IPS	1968 (RR)	31-12-2004 to 31–12–2006
24	Sri M. A. Basith, IPS	1970 (RR)	01-01-2007 to 31–10–2007
25	Sri S. S. P. Yadav, IPS	1972 (RR)	31-10-2007 to 07–10–2009
26	Sri R. R. Girish Kumar, IPS	1976 (RR)	07-10-2009 to 31–08–2010
27	Sri K. Aravinda Rao, IPS	1977 (RR)	01-09-2010 to 30–06–2011
28	Sri V. Dinesh Reddy, IPS	1977 (RR)	30-06-2011 to 29–10–2013
29	Dr. B. Prasada Rao, IPS	1979 (RR)	30-10-2013 to 02–06–2014

== See also ==
- Telangana State Police Academy
- Hyderabad City Police
- Cyberabad Metropolitan Police
- Future City Police Commissionerate
- Malkajgiri Police Commissionerate
- Ramagundam Police Commissionerate
- Warangal Police Commissionerate
- Nizamabad Police Commissionerate
- Karimnagar Police Commissionerate
- Khammam Police Commissionerate
- SHE Teams
