= Andhra Pradesh Police =

Police agency in India

Andra Pradesh Police
- Common name: Andhra Pradesh Police
- Abbreviation: APP
- Motto: Satyameva Jayate సత్యమేవ జయతే

Agency overview
- Formed: 1 November 1956; 70 years ago, Hyderabad, AP, India
- Annual budget: ₹8,570 crore (US$920 million) (2025-26 est.)

Jurisdictional structure
- Operations jurisdiction: Andhra Pradesh, IN
- Andhra Pradesh Police's jurisdiction
- Area: 162,970 km^{2} (62,920 sq mi)
- Legal jurisdiction: State of Andhra Pradesh
- Governing body: Government of Andhra Pradesh
- General nature: Local civilian police

Operational structure
- Overseen by: Government of Andhra Pradesh
- Headquarters: Mangalagiri, Amaravati, Andhra Pradesh - 522502
- Elected officer responsible: Vangalapudi Anitha, Home Minister
- Agency executive: Harish Kumar Gupta, IPS, Director General of Police, Andhra Pradesh State
- Parent agency: Home Department, Government of Andhra Pradesh.
- Child agencies: Visakhapatnam City Police; Vijayawada City Police

Website
- citizen.appolice.gov.in

The Andhra Pradesh Police is the law enforcement agency of the state of Andhra Pradesh, India. Public order and police being a state subject in India, the police force is headed by the Director General of Police, Harish Kumar Gupta, IPS. The Andhra Pradesh Police headquarters is located at Amaravati, Andhra Pradesh.

== History ==
The Madras Act XXIV(24) of 1859 which marked the beginning of the Madras Police and shortly later, the Police Act of 1861 instituted the system of police which forms the foundation of modern-day police in India. The "Ceded Areas" of Andhra, as they were popularly known, continued as a part of the Madras Police and it was only in October 1953, after the birth of a separate Andhra State, that the Andhra State Police gained individual existence. Finally with the formation of the Andhra Pradesh on 1 November 1956 integrating the Telugu areas of the erstwhile Hyderabad state with the Andhra State, the modern day Andhra Pradesh Police came into existence. After the bifurcation of the state in 2014, the police force once again bifurcated. This time, it was divided into Andhra Pradesh police and Telangana Police.

== Andhra Pradesh State Level Recruitment Board ==
The Andhra Pradesh State Police Recruitment Board is responsible for recruitment. The board is releases recruitment notification time to time and conducts written examinations, physical tests, medical tests, and interviews for selecting applicants.

== Police ranks ==
The Andhra Pradesh Police designates the following ranks.

Officers

- Director General of Police (DGP)
- Additional Director General of Police (Addl.DGP)
- Inspector General of Police (IGP)
- Deputy Inspector General of Police (DIG)
- Superintendent of Police (SP)
- Additional Superintendent of Police (Addl.SP)
- Assistant superintendent of police / Deputy superintendent of police
  (ASP / DSP)

Sub-ordinates

- Inspector of Police (Insp.)
- Sub-inspector (SI)
- Assistant sub-inspector of police (ASI)

Constables

- Head constable (HC)
- Police Constable (PC)

== Structure and organization ==
=== Districts ===
Each police district is either coterminous with the Revenue district, or is located entirely within a revenue district. It is headed by a District commissioner of Police (or simply called Superintendent of Police). Each district comprises two or more Sub-Divisions, several circles and Police Stations.

=== Sub-Divisions ===
Each Sub-Division is headed by a Police officer of the rank Deputy Superintendent of Police (Officers of Andhra Pradesh Police Service are directly recruited officers or promoted from lower ranks) or an Assistant Superintendent of Police (Officers of Indian Police Service). The officer who heads a Sub-Division is known as S.D.P.O. resp. Sub Divisional Police Officer.

=== Circles ===
A Circle comprises several Police Stations. An Inspector of Police who heads a police circle is the Circle Inspector of Police or CI.

=== Stations ===
A Police Station is headed by an Inspector (an upper subordinate rank). A Police Station is the basic unit of policing, responsible for prevention and detection of crime, maintenance of public order, enforcing law in general as well as for performing protection duties and making security arrangements for the constitutional authorities, government functionaries, representatives of the public in different legislative bodies and local self governments, public figures etc.

=== Commissionerate ===
A Police Commissionerate is a law enforcement body especially in the urban parts of the state. The commissionerate is headed by a Commissioner of Police. Guntur Police Commissionerate, Kurnool Police Commissionerate, Rajamahendravaram Police Commissionerate, Tirupati Police Commissionerate, Vijayawada City Police and Visakhapatnam City Police are the local law enforcement agencies for the cities of Guntur, Kurnool, Rajamahendravaram, Tirupati, Vijayawada and Visakhapatnam respectively.

== Insignia of Andhra Pradesh Police (State Police) ==
Gazetted Officers

Indian Police Service cadre officers rank insignia
Insignia
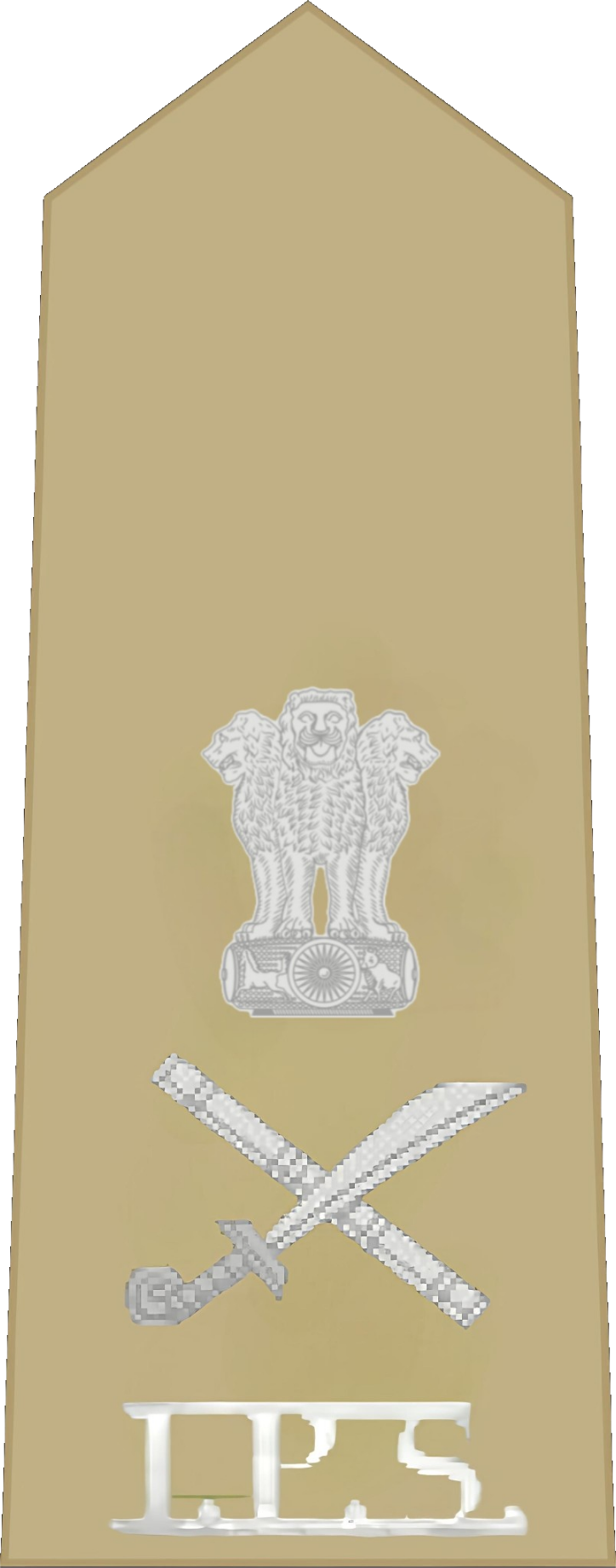
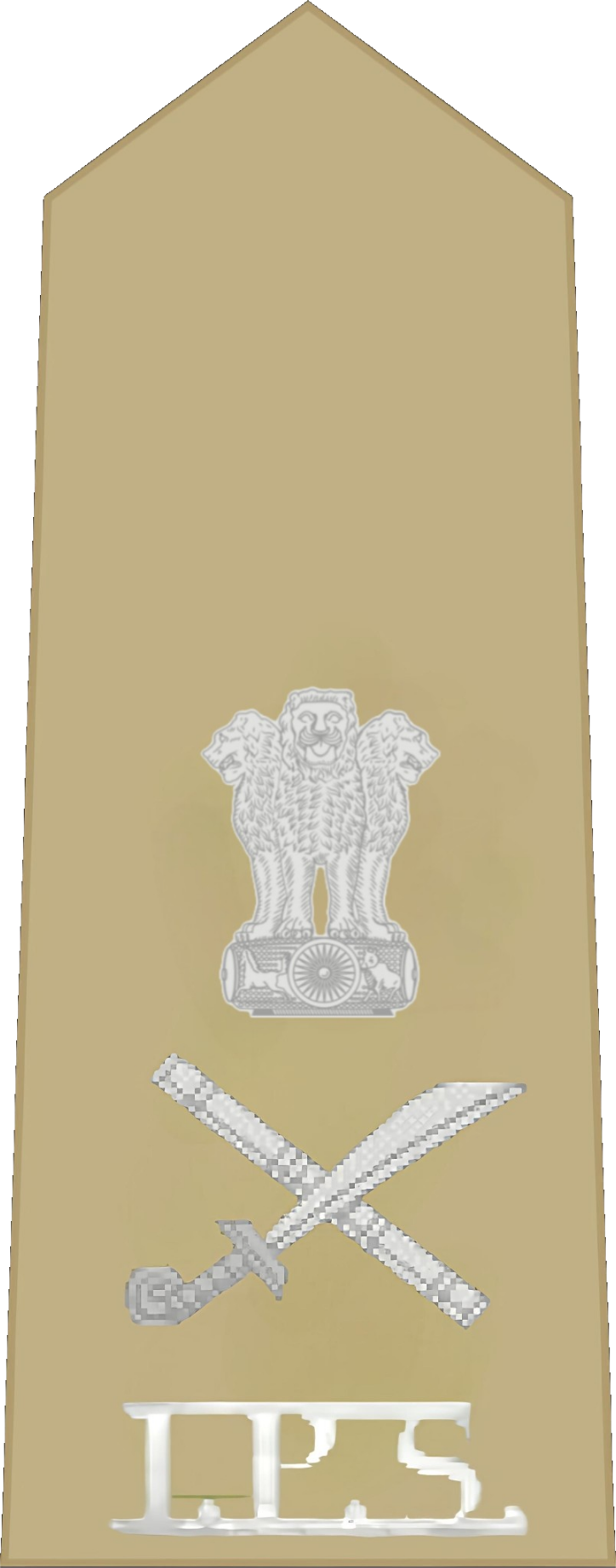
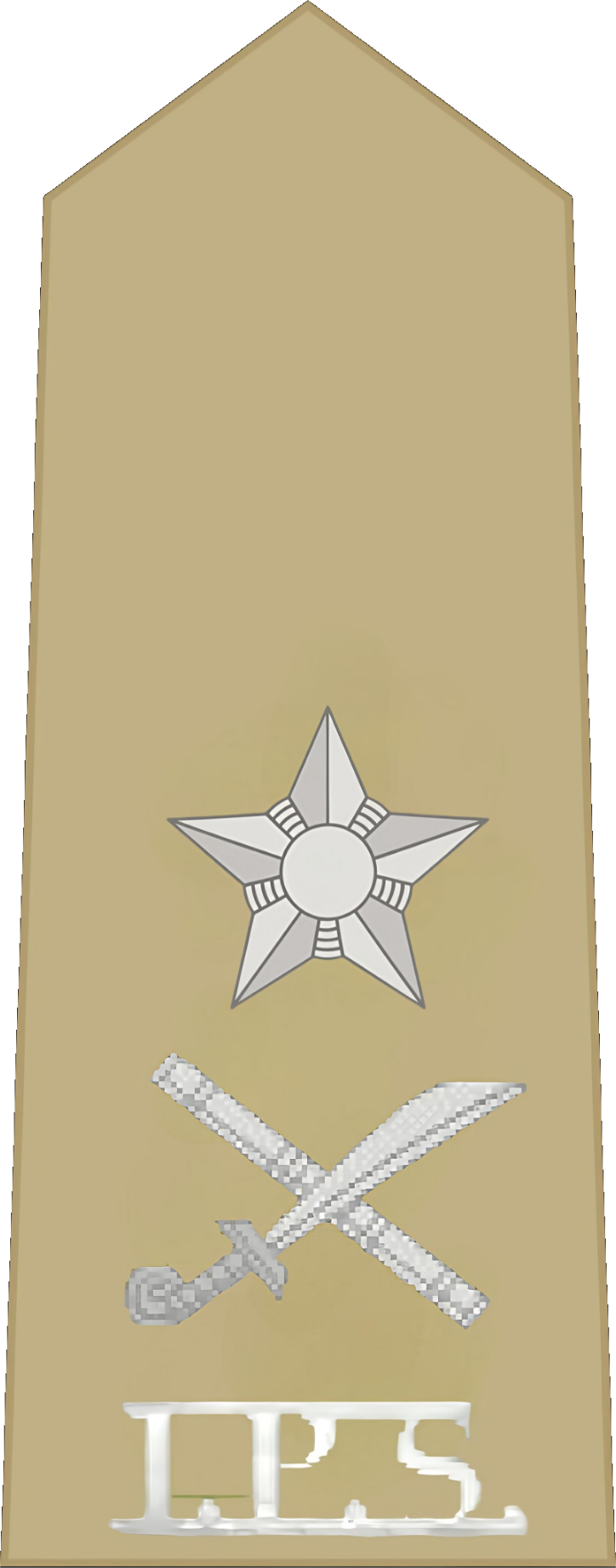
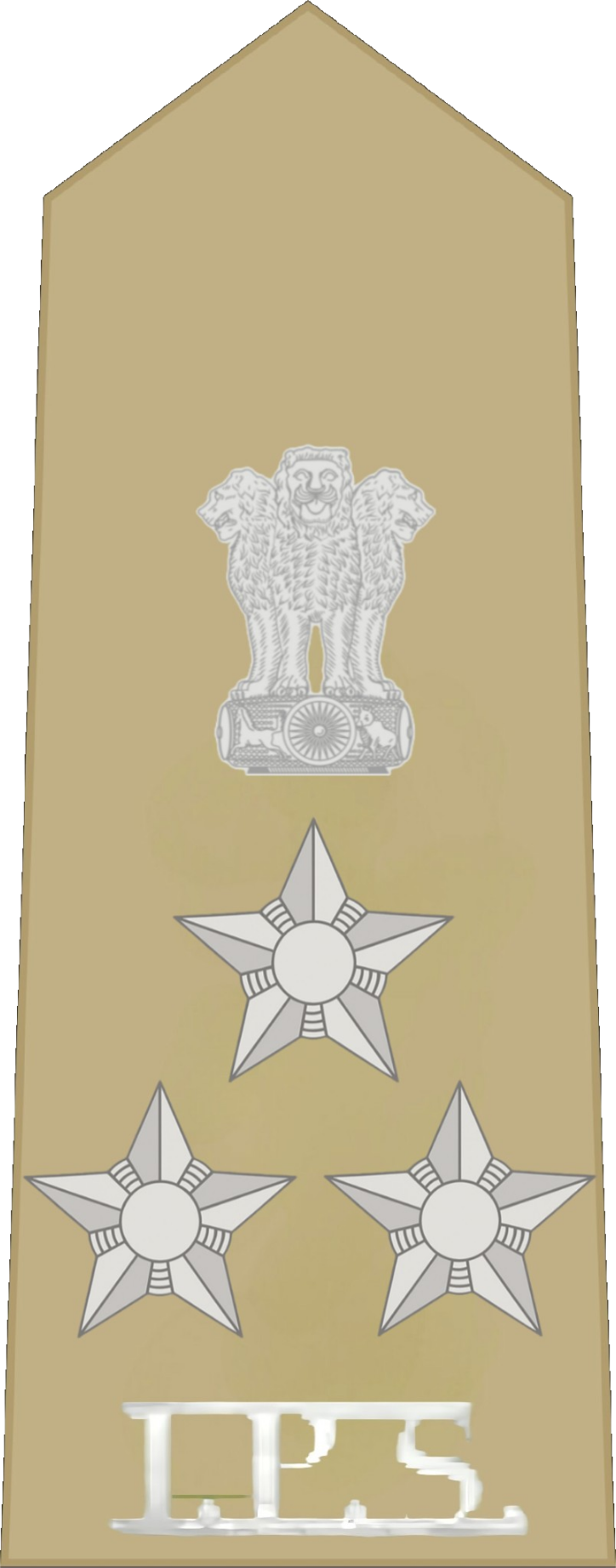
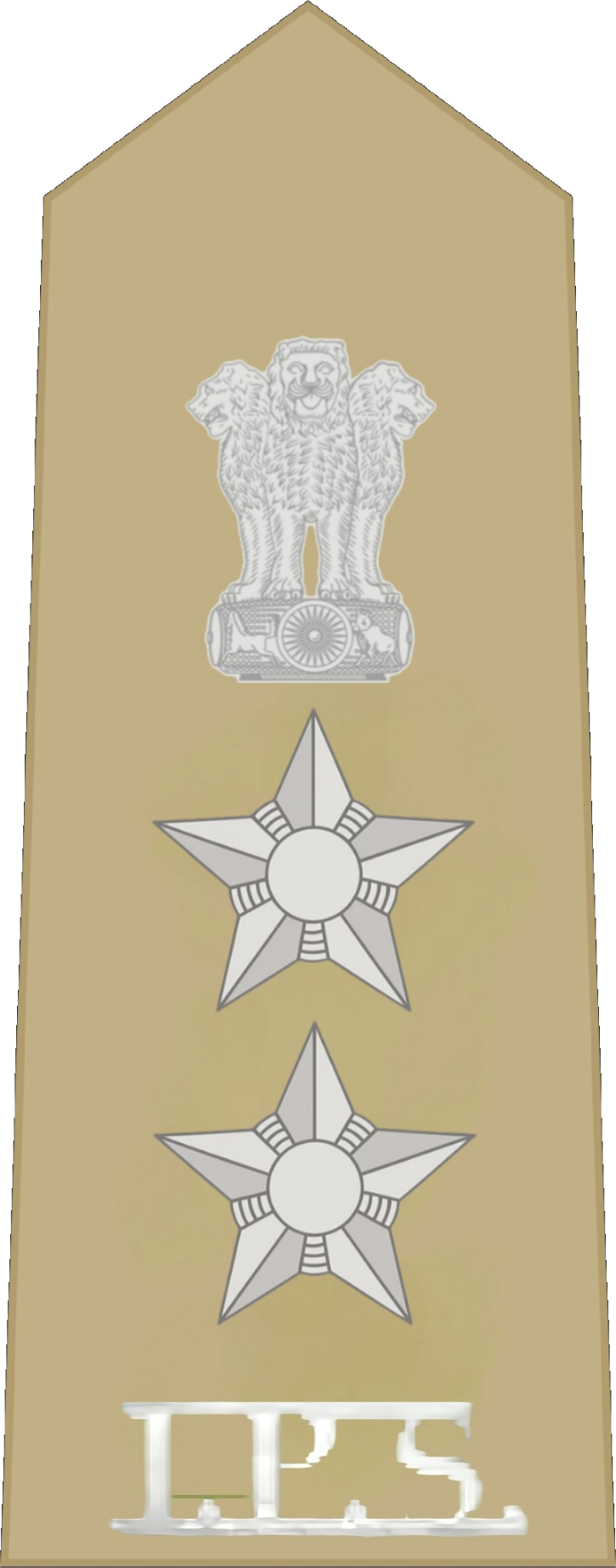
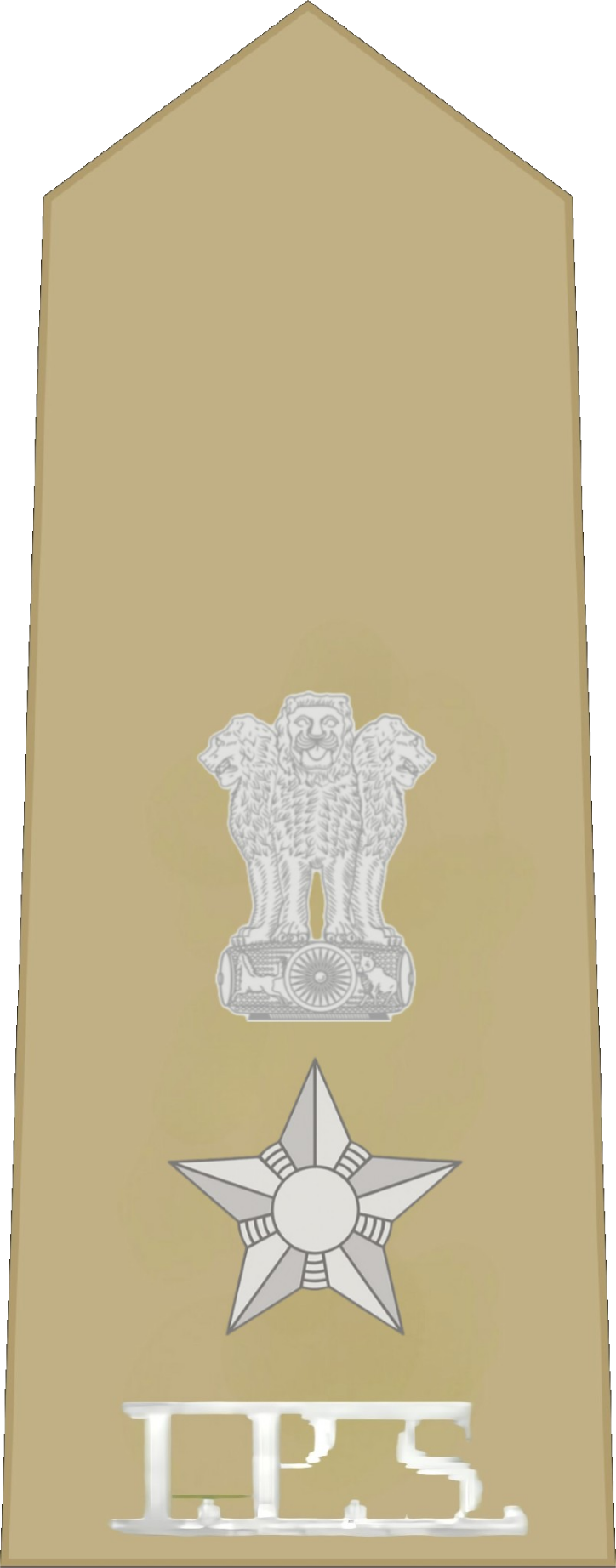
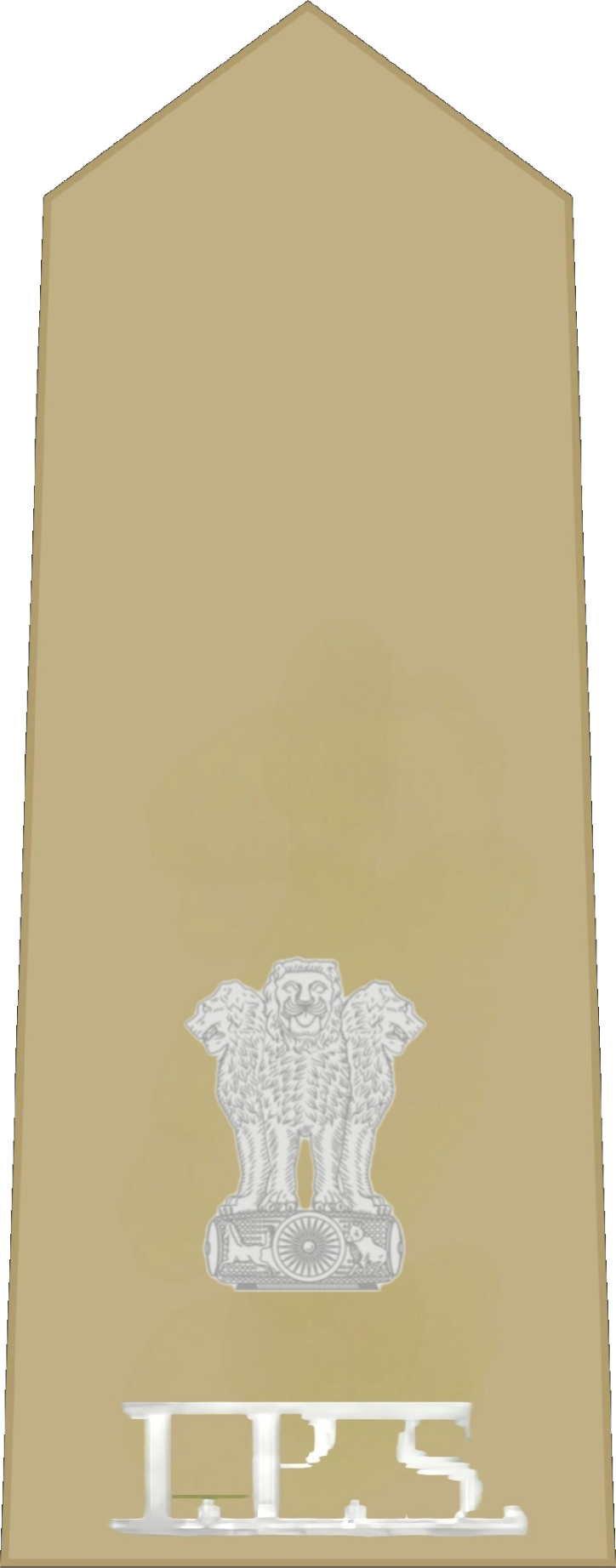
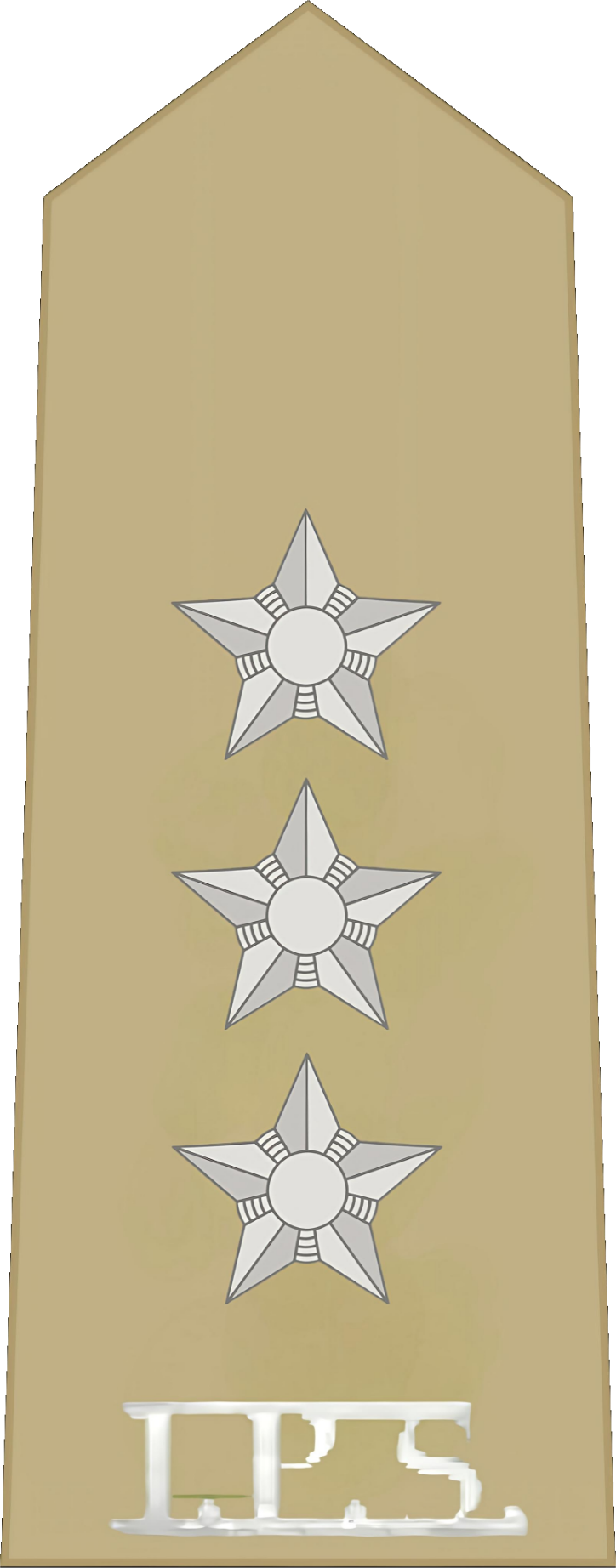
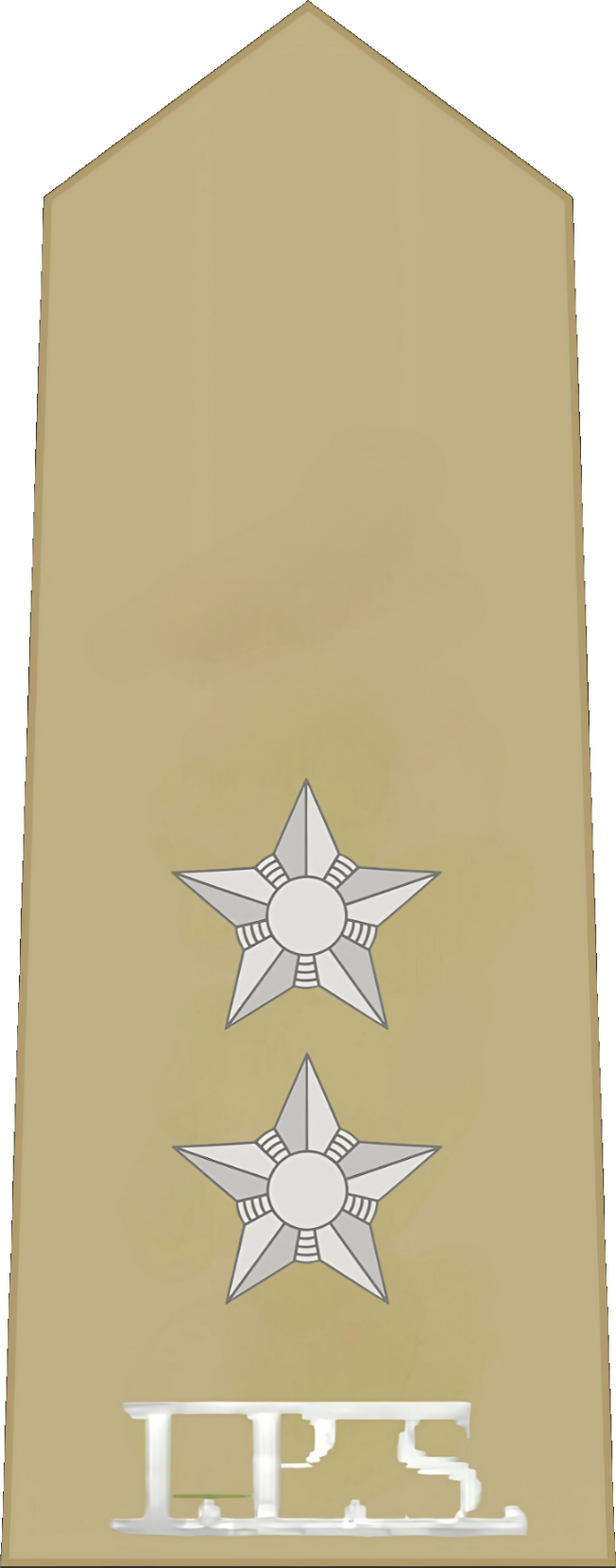
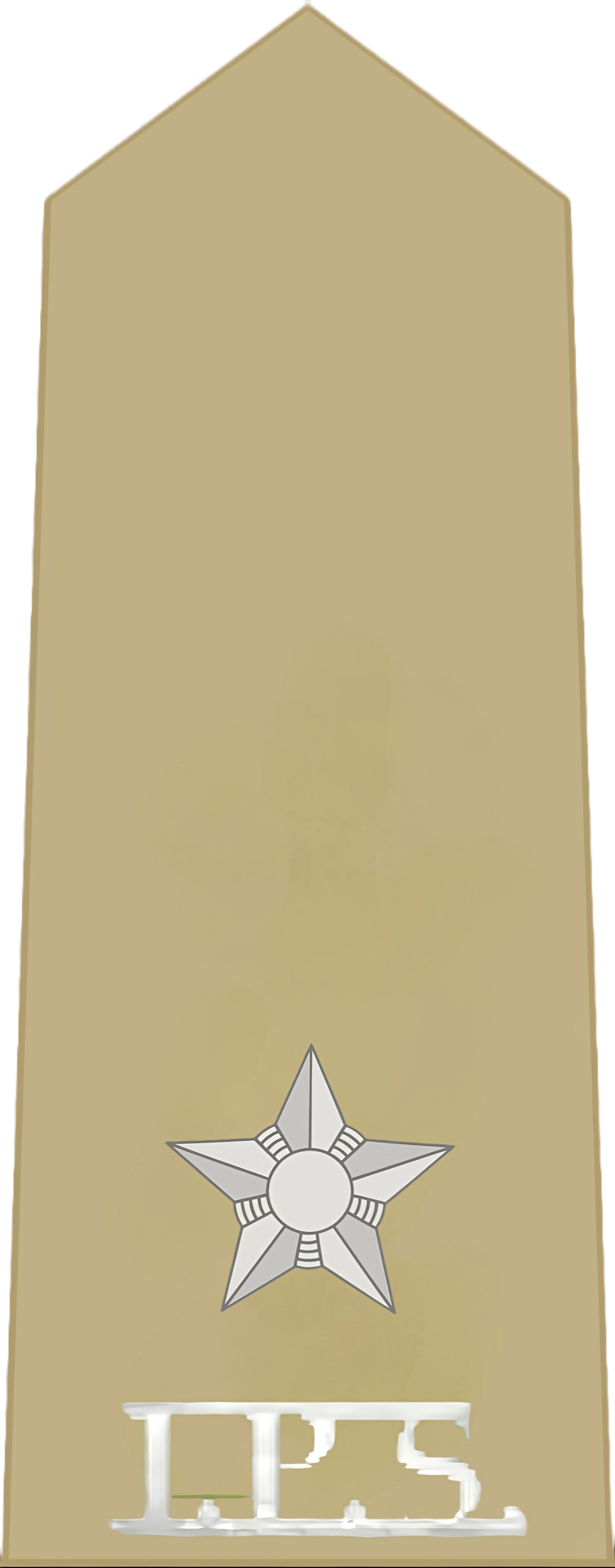
Rank
Director General of Police
Additional Director General of Police (Note: Rank insignia of DGP is similar to Additional DGP.)
Inspector General of Police
Deputy Inspector General of Police
Superintendent of Police (Selection Grade) (Note: The Senior Superintendent of Police (SSP) is a post, not a rank, typically held by an SP (selection grade or junior grade) in states like Uttar Pradesh, Jammu and Kashmir, and Punjab.)
Superintendent of Police
Additional superintendent of police
Assistant Superintendent of Police
Assistant superintendent of police (Probationary for two years)
Assistant Superintendent of Police (Probationary for one year)
Abbreviation
DGP
ADGP
IGP
DIGP
SP (SG)
SP
Addl.SP
ASP
ASP
ASP

- Note 1: The rank insignia of DGP, Spl.DGP, Addl.DGP is the same.
- Note 2: The equivalent rank to the ASP (Asst.SP) in State Police Services is the deputy superintendent of police (DSP/DySP).
- Note 3: The commissioner of police is a post typically held by DIG and above rank officers.

Non-gazetted officers

Indian Police non-gazetted officers rank insignia
Insignia
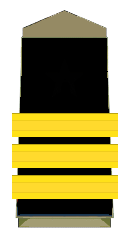
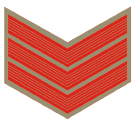
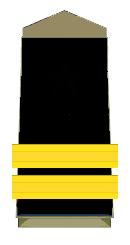
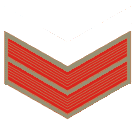
No insignia
Rank
Inspector of Police
Inspector / Circle Inspector (Note: Inspector or Circle Inspector with One Five-Pointed Star insignia exists in West Bengal Police.)
Assistant Police Inspector (Note: This rank exists only in the Maharashtra Police.)
Sub-Inspector
Sergeant (Kolkata Police)
Assistant Sub-Inspector
Head Constable (Note: Shoulder insignia rank only used in the Maharashtra Police.)
Senior Constable (Note: This rank is also known as senior constable, constable grade-I, and exists only in some state police forces.)
Police constable
Abbreviation
INSP
INSP / CO
API
SI
Sgt
ASI
HC
SC
PC

- The rank of Sergeant is used in India only in the Bihar Police and the Kolkata Police
- The One Five Pointed Star for the rank of Inspector is used by Police forces of 7 states viz. West Bengal, Jharkhand, Bihar, Sikkim, Assam, Nagaland and Tripura. This is because Inspectors of Police in these 7 states are Gazetted Officers. However, the Kolkata Police uses the Four Pointed Star of the Order of Bath for the ranks of Inspector and Assistant Commissioner of Police instead of Five Pointed Star. For the ranks of ASI, SI/Sergeant and Deputy Commissioner of Police, the usual Five Pointed Star is used
- Colour pattern and size of chevrons may vary according to the different rules of several distinct Indian State Police services.

== List of Directors General of Police in Andhra Pradesh ==
Sl. No.	Name	Batch	Tenure
1	A. K. K. Nambiar, IPS	1935 (SPS)	1-11-1956 to 2–8–1967
2	Sivakumar Lal, IPS	1935 (SPS)	3-8-1967 to 6–10–1968
3	Atma Jayaram, IPS	1942 (SPS)	7-10-1968 to 6–11–1971
4	B. N Kalyan Rao, IPS	1943 (SPS)	7-11-1971 to 15–7–1973
5	Abdus Salam Khan, IPS	1947 (SPS)	16-7-1973 to 30–4–1975
6	K. Ramachandra Reddy, IPS	1944 (SPS)	1-5-1975 to 31–10–1978
7	M. V. Narayana Rao, IPS	1948 (RR)	1-11-1978 to 31–3–1982
8	S. Ananda Ram, IPS	1950 (RR)	1-4-1982 to 10–4–1983
9	K. G. Erady, IPS	1952 (RR)	11-4-1983 to 21–8–1984
10	M. Mahendar Reddy, IPS	1953 (RR)	22-8-1984 to 16–1–1985
11	P. V. G. Krishnamacharyulu, IPS	1951 (RR)	17-1-1985 to 28–2–1986
12	C. G. Saldanha, IPS	1953 (RR)	1-3-1986 to 31–3–1987
13	P. S. Rammohan Rao, IPS	1956 (RR)	1-4-1987 to 9–2–1989
14	Sushil Kumar, IPS	1955 (RR)	10-2-1989 to 23–4–1990
15	R. Prabhakar Rao, IPS	1957 (RR)	24-4-1990 to 28–2–1992
16	T. Suryanarayana Rao, IPS	1958 (RR)	1-3-1992 to 28–2–1994
17	M. V. Bhaskar Rao, IPS	1962 (RR)	1-3-1994 to 16–12–1994
18	R. K. Ragaala, IPS	1962 (RR)	16-12-1994 to 31–7–1995
19	M. S. Raju, IPS	1962 (RR)	31-7-1995 to 30–11–1996
20	H. J. Dora, IPS	1965 (RR)	30-11-1996 to 18–02–2002
21	Pervaram Ramulu, IPS	1967 (RR)	18-02-2002 to 31–07–2003
22	S. R. Sukumara, IPS	1967 (RR)	31-07-2003 to 31–12–2004
23	Noel Swaranjit Sen, IPS	1968 (RR)	31-12-2004 to 31–12–2006
24	M. A. Basith, IPS	1970 (RR)	01-01-2007 to 31–10–2007
25	S. S. P. Yadav, IPS	1972 (RR)	31-10-2007 to 07–10–2009
26	R. R. Girish Kumar, IPS	1976 (RR)	07-10-2009 to 31–08–2010
27	K. Aravinda Rao, IPS	1977 (RR)	01-09-2010 to 30–06–2011
28	V. Dinesh Reddy, IPS	1977 (RR)	30-06-2011 to 29–10–2013
29	Dr. B. Prasada Rao, IPS	1979 (RR)	30-10-2013 to 02–06–2014
30	J. V. Ramudu, IPS	1981 (RR)	02-06-2014 to 23–07–2016
31	N. Samba Siva Rao, IPS	1984 (RR)	23-07-2016 to 30–12–2017
32	M. Malakondaiah, IPS	1985 (RR)	31-12-2017 to 30–06–2018
33	R. P. Thakur, IPS	1986 (RR)	01-07-2018 to 01–06–2019
34	Damodar Goutam Sawang, IPS	1986 (RR)	01-06-2019 to 15–02–2022
35	K. V. Rajendranath Reddy, IPS	1992 (RR)	15-02-2022 to 05–05–2024
36	Harish Kumar Gupta, IPS	1992 (RR)	06-05-2024 to 19–06–2024
37	Ch. D. Tirumala Rao, IPS	1989 (RR)	19-06-2024 to 31–01–2025
38	Harish Kumar Gupta, IPS	1992 (RR)	01-02-2025 to Incumbent

== Medals and Commendations Awarded ==
=== Awarded by Center ===
Sources:

- President's Medal for Gallanty (PMG)
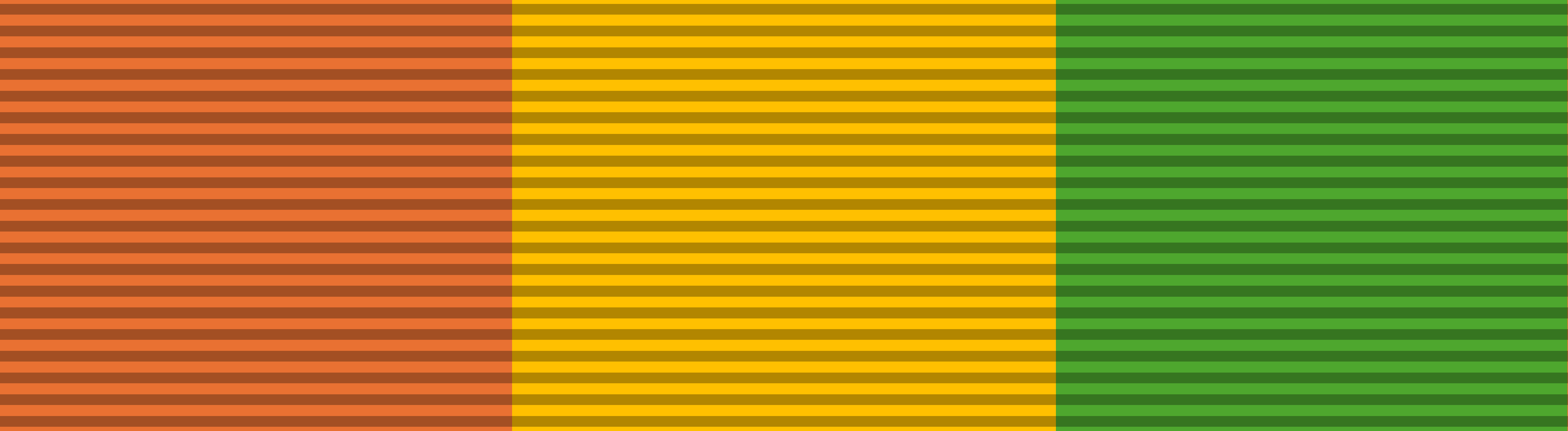
- Police Medal for Gallantry now Medal for Gallantry (MG)
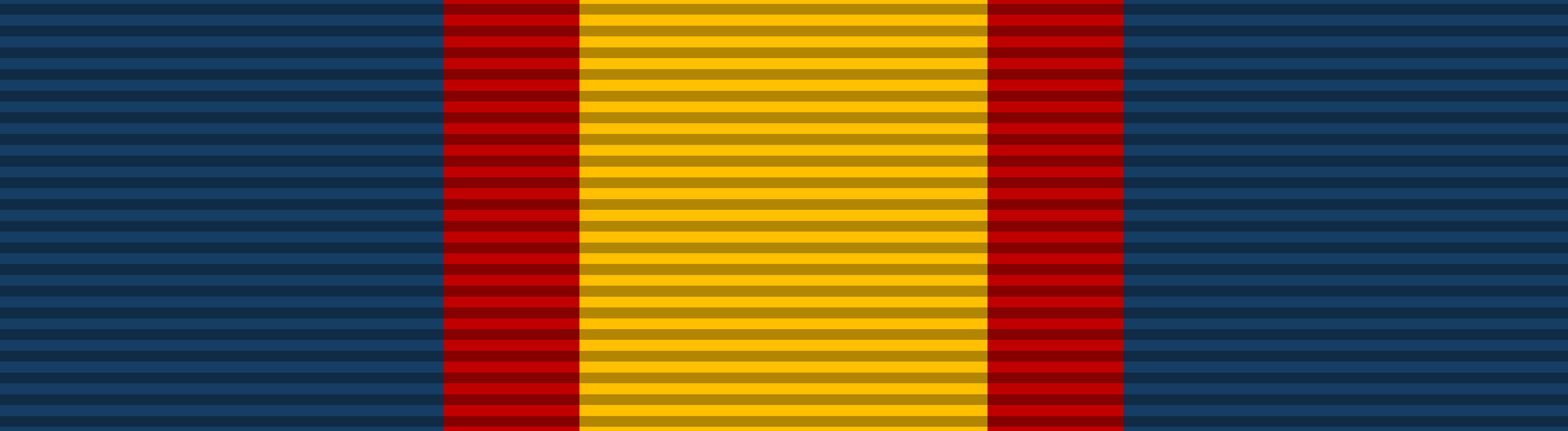
- President’s Police Medal (PPM) now President's Medal for Distinguished Service (PSM)
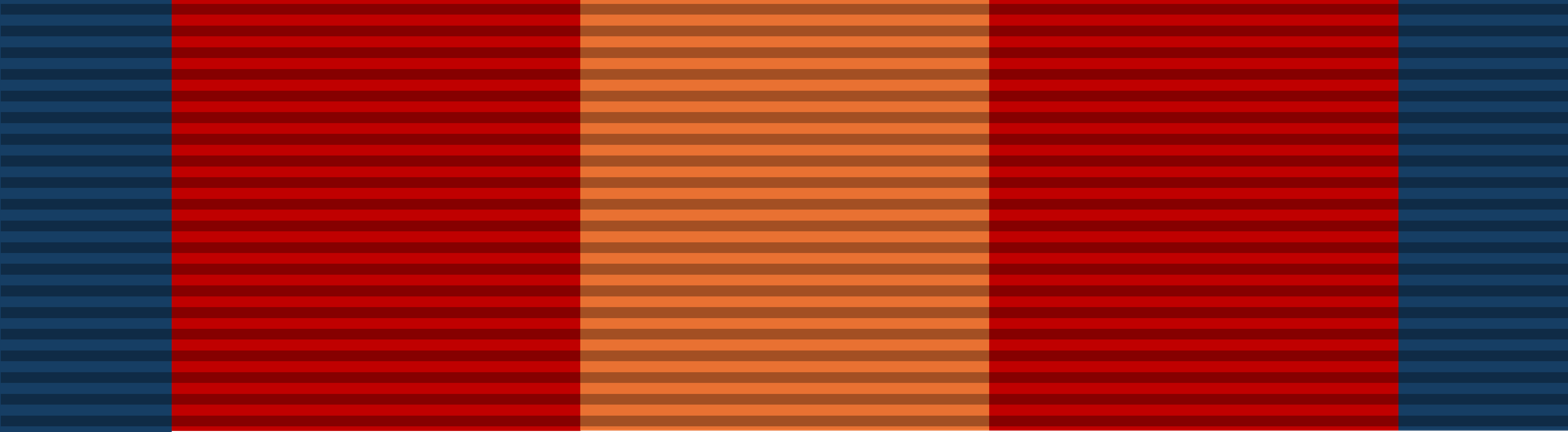
- Indian Police Medal for Meritorious Service(IPM) now Medal for Meritorious Service (MSM)
- Kendriya Grihamantri Dakshata Padak
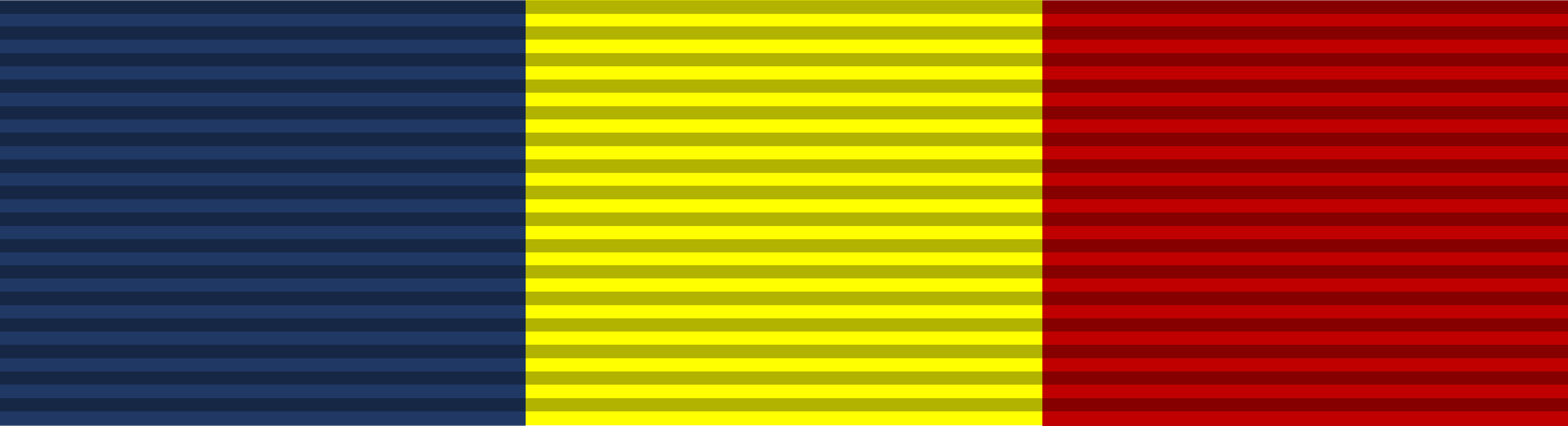
- Ati Utkrisht Seva Padak
- Utkrisht Seva Padak

=== Awarded by State ===
Sources:

- Mukyamantri Shourya Pathakam (Gallantry)
- Mahoonatha Seva Pathakam
- Uttama Seva Pathakam
- Seva Pathakam
- Katina Seva Pathakam
- DGP Commendation Disc

== Incidents ==
On 12 May 2017, Andhra Pradesh Police computer's network was attacked by a malware known as WannaCry ransomware attack which was found to be critical.

== See also ==
- Operation Puttur
- Visakhapatnam City Police
- Vijayawada City Police
