= Ravi Joseph Lokku =

Indian police officer (born 1966)

Ravi Joseph Lokku, IPS
- Born: Ravi Kumar Lokku; 10 August 1966 (age 60); Kurnool, Andhra Pradesh
- Education: B.Sc., M.A., Postgraduate diploma in International Humanitarian Law
- Police career
- Indian Police Service: Uttar Pradesh Cadre
- Service years: 4 September 1995 -Present
- Status: Additional Director General, Bureau of Police Research and Development
- Rank: Additional Director General of Police
- Badge no.: 19951075 of 1995 batch (48 Regular Recruit)
- Awards: Bureau of Police Research and Development DGs Commendation Disc (2006), Police Medal for Meritorious Service (2011), Border Security Force DGs Commendation Gold Disc (2016), National Disaster Response Force DGs Commendation Disc (2017), Bay of Bengal Initiative for Multi-Sectoral Technical and Economic Cooperation DGs Commendation Disc (2017), Utkrisht Seva Padak (2020), Director General of Police's Commendation Disci Silver (2020), President's Police Medal for Distinguished Service (2021), Director General of Police's Commendation Disc Gold (2021)

Ravi Joseph Lokku, IPS, USP PMMS PPMDS (born 10 August 1966) is the present Additional Director General, Bureau of Police Research and Development, New Delhi. He is also on the Executive Council of Rashtriya Raksha University, New Delhi.

Joseph is a nationally known Police Officer, having served in Central Detective Training Institute, Border Security Force, National Disaster Response Force, Fire Services, Civil Defence and Home Guards. Owing allegiance to the Uttar Pradesh Police Cadre (1995 batch), he served in strategic positions across Uttar Pradesh for nearly three decades (1995 to 2023).

At the 8th National Conference of Heads of Prisons of all States and Union Territories held in the port city of Visakhapatnam on 11 and 12 September 2023, he liaised with Harish Kumar Gupta, IPS of the Andhra Pradesh Police to jointly conduct the programme. He also addressed the delegates in the presence of his Director, Balaji Srivastav, IPS of the Bureau of Police Research and Development, New Delhi

== Early life and education ==
Ravi Joseph was born in Kurnool Town in Andhra Pradesh,. He graduated with a B.Sc. degree. He also pursued a postgraduate degree leading to M.A. In addition, Ravi also has a Postgraduate diploma in International Humanitarian Law.

== Career ==
After getting selected to the Union Public Service Commission, Ravi Joseph began his training as an Indian Police Service Probationer of 1995 batch (48 Regular Recruit) at Lal Bahadur Shastri National Academy of Administration, Mussorie and the Sardar Vallabhbhai Patel National Police Academy, Hyderabad. During the years' 1994–1995, he was in Hyderabad, training under the successive Directorships of Sankar Sen, IPS and A. P. Durai, IPS.

=== The first decade: 1995-2004 ===
In 2002 Joseph was Principal of Central Detective Training School, Hyderabad.

=== The second decade: 2005-2014 ===
In the year 2010, Joseph was Superintendent of Police, Ghaziabad. In 2011, he was Deputy Inspector General, Uttar Pradesh Provincial Armed Constabulary, Lucknow. The following year in 2012, he moved to Allahabad. At an event hosted by the century-old Sam Higginbottom University of Agriculture, Technology and Sciences, Allahabad in 2012 on the theme Vocationalisation of Secondary Education, he was invited as Chief Guest and shared dais along with Prof. Harikesh Singh of the National Institute of Educational Planning and Administration.

In early 2013, he moved to the Border Security Force, Ferozepur. He was noted to have been tough on border intrusions during his tenure at the Western Command, Punjab Frontier, Ferozepur Sector.

During the 2014 Indian general election in Bihar, Joseph was Police Observer in Assembly Constituencies of Sultanganj, Amarpur, Dhoraiya, Banka, Katoria, and Belhar.

=== The third decade: 2015-2024 ===
Continuing his stint at the BSF, Joseph was elevated to the rank of Inspector General in June 2016.

In April 2017, Joseph became Inspector General of National Disaster Response Force (NDRF). When Cyclone Ockhi struck parts of India in December 2017, Joseph was already at the helm of NDRF. He deposed before a Department related Parliamentary Standing Committee on Home Affairs on the impact of the cyclone on fisherfolk and the damage caused by it. In 2018, he spoke on the role of NDRF to earthquakes at the India-Japan Workshop on Disaster Risk Reduction. During this period from 31 December 2018 to 1 March 2019, he also held the additional charge of Director General, Fire Services, Civil Defence and Home Guards. In May 2019 Cyclone Fani made its landfall in Odisha. Joseph reported that NDRF was making efforts to prevent human loss and restore normalcy.

By early 2019 Joseph completed his deputation and returned to his parent cadre in Uttar Pradesh. The same year in August 2019, he became Inspector General, Security of Uttar Pradesh Police. In March 2020, Joseph became General Staff Officer to Director General of Police in Uttar Pradesh, Mukul Goel, IPS. During the 2021 elections in India, Joseph was named as Police Observer by the Election Commission of India.

In March 2022, he was transferred to Vigilance. In April 2022, he was made Additional Director General of Police Training College, Moradabad, a position he held until March 2023.

On 21 March 2023, he was sent on central deputation to New Delhi to the Bureau of Police Research and Development, where he is expected to serve until his superannuation. In April 2024, he was promoted as Additional Director General of Bureau of Police Research and Development.

Joseph is also a Police Observer for the 2024 Indian general election in Andaman and Nicobar Islands Lok Sabha constituency.

== Awards and medals ==
Ravi Joseph won many medals, these include:

- Bureau of Police Research and Development DGs Commendation Disc (2006),
- Police Medal for Meritorious Service (2011),
- Border Security Force DGs Commendation Gold Disc (2016),
- National Disaster Response Force DGs Commendation Disc (2017),
- Bay of Bengal Initiative for Multi-Sectoral Technical and Economic Cooperation DGs Commendation Disc (2017),
- Utkrisht Seva Padak (2020),
- Director General of Police's Commendation Disci Silver (2020),
- President's Police Medal for Distinguished Service (2021),
- Director General of Police's Commendation Disc Gold (2021)

Police appointments
Preceded by Anupama Nilekar Chandra, IPS	Additional Director, Bureau of Police Research and Development, New Delhi; 21 March 2023 to present	Succeeded by Incumbent
Preceded by Sanjay Kumar, IPS	Director General (Additional Charge), Fire Services, Civil Defence and Home Guards, New Delhi	Succeeded by S. N. Pradhan, IPS
