= R. P. Thakur =

- Born: Ram Pravaesh Thakur; Patna
- Education: Civil Engineering
- Alma mater: IIT Kanpur
- Occupation: Indian Police Service
- Office: Andhra Pradesh Director General of Police
- Term: 1 July 2018 – 1 June 2019

Ram Pravaesh Thakur is an Indian police officer and former Andhra Pradesh DGP. He is an Indian Police Service (IPS) officer from the 1986 batch of the Andhra Pradesh cadre. He was appointed as DGP on 1 July 2018 and served in the position till 1 June 2019. He is a B.Tech graduate from IIT Kanpur joined the Indian Police Service in 1986.

== Police appointments ==
RP Thakur joined the service as Additional Superintendent of Police at National Police Academy in Hyderabad in 1986. He later worked as ASP in Guntur, Warangal districts, Suryapet, Grey Hounds, Sattenapalli sub-divisions, later as ASP Warangal district till 1992. He was promoted as Superintendent of Police and worked as SP of West Godavari, Kadapa, Krishna, Warangal districts and later as DCP west zone in Hyderabad till 2000.

He was promoted to DIG rank and posted to head Anantapur range and later worked as Central Industrial Security (CISF) Patna DIG from 2002 to 2007 on central deputation. Thakur was promoted to Inspector General and worked as Rayalaseema and Warangal regions IG from 2007 to 2011. He was then promoted as Additional Director General in 2011 served as ADGP (Technology Services), DG (Drugs & Copyright), Controller legal metrology, DG Vigilance and Enforcement and law and order till 2016.

RP Thakur On promotion as Director General in 2016, he was posted as Director General of state ACB (Anti-Corruption Bureau) in November 2016, and was appointed Director General of Police, Head of Police Force (DGP, HoPF) on 30 June 2018 and served in the position until 1 June 2019. He later worked as Commissioner of Printing, Stationery and Stores Purchase and was appointee as vice-chairman and managing director of AP State Road Transport Corporation (APSRTC) and took charge on 19 Jan 2021. Ram Prawesh Thakur appointed as a member of the Commissionerate of Inquiries on 5 September 2021.
