= Harish Kumar Gupta =

Indian police officer

Harish Kumar Gupta, IPS
- Born: 2 August 1965 (age 61); Jammu and Kashmir, India
- Other name: Harish K. Gupta
- Education: Government Gandhi Memorial Science College, Jammu; University of Jammu, Jammu; Lal Bahadur Shastri National Academy of Administration, Mussorie; Sardar Vallabhbhai Patel National Police Academy, Hyderabad; University of Cambridge, Cambridge (England); University of Louisiana, Louisiana (United States); Indian Institute of Management, Ahmedabad; Indian Institute of Management, Bangalore
- Police career
- Indian Police Service: Andhra Pradesh Cadre
- Service years: 10 October 1992-Present
- Status: Head of Police Force (HoPF) (w.e.f. 31 January 2025; 20 months ago); Vigilance & Enforcement and ex officio Principal Secretary (Vigilance & Enforcement), General Administration Department (w.e.f. 11 July 2024; 2 years ago),
- Rank: Director general of police
- Badge no.: 19921011 of 1992 batch (45 Regular Recruit)
- Awards: Ati Utkrisht Seva Padak (2018); President's Police Medal for Distinguished Service (2018); Police Medal for Meritorious Service (2009)

Harish Kumar Gupta, IPS, AUSP PPMDS PMMS (born 2 August 1965) is an Indian Police Service Officer currently serving as Director General, Vigilance & Enforcement and ex officio Principal Secretary (Vigilance & Enforcement) General Administration Department. He has also been reappointed as Director General of Police-Andhra Pradesh Police (Head of Police Force) with Full Additional Charge w.e.f. 31 January 2025.

Harish Kumar belongs to the 1992 batch (45 Regular Recruit) of the Indian Police Service. He hails from Jammu and Kashmir (state). His career spanning over three decades began in the nineties in Undivided Andhra Pradesh. After the bifurcation of the state in 2014, he was retained in the residuary Andhra Pradesh.

In the past, he held the position of Head of Police Force (HoPF) Andhra Pradesh Police from 6 May 2024 through 19 June 2024.

== Early life and education ==
=== Scholastic and Collegiate studies ===
Harish Kumar Gupta was born in Jammu and Kashmir (state). He pursued his education in the town of Jammu. He schooled at the Government Sri Ranbir Model Higher Secondary School and then joined the Government Gandhi Memorial Science College from where he earned an undergraduate degree in sciences. Harish Kumar Gupta also pursued a course leading to an undergraduate law degree.

=== Other courses ===
As part of his interest and learning, Harish Kumar also pursued certificate and diploma courses at University of Cambridge (England), University of Louisiana, Louisiana (United States), the Indian Institute of Management Ahmedabad and the Indian Institute of Management, Bangalore.

== Career ==
=== 1992 batch (45 Regular Recruit) ===
After clearing the examinations conducted by the Union Public Service Commission, Harish Kumar chose the Indian Police Service and underwent training at the Lal Bahadur Shastri National Academy of Administration, Mussorie followed by the Sardar Vallabhbhai Patel National Police Academy, Hyderabad. He was at the SVPNPA between 1991 and 1992 during the Directorships of P. D. Malaviya, IPS and Sankar Sen, IPS. Among those in the 1992 batch (45 Regular Recruit) hailing from Andhra Pradesh Cadre include P. S. R. Anjaneyulu, IPS, K. V. Rajendranath Reddy, IPS and Nalin Prabhat, IPS. Harish Kumar was inducted into the Indian Police Service on 10 October 1992 and assigned the Undivided Andhra Pradesh Cadre.

=== Undivided Andhra Pradesh ===
Beginning as a probationer for a year from 1992 to 1993, Harish Kumar served in notable positions, raising up the ranks of the Indian Police Service. He was Assistant superintendent of police in the districts of Khammam, Medak and Peddapalli town. He then became Additional superintendent of police, serving from 1996 to 1997 in Karimnagar district and then moved over to Operations, serving in Nalgonda district. In 1997, he became Superintendent of Police in Krishna district. Harish Kumar moved to Hyderabad by the end of 1999, assuming the position of Commandant of Andhra Pradesh Special Police 1st Battalion, Yousufguda. In mid-2002, he shifted to the Criminal Investigation Department (India), Hyderabad. In December 2002, during the Commissionerate of M. V. Krishna Rao, IPS, he was appointed as the Deputy Commissioner of Police, heading South Zone, Hyderabad City Police. Later in 2004, he went to Nalgonda district where he served for two years as its superintendent of Police.

In the year 2006, Harish Kumar rose to the ranks of Deputy inspector general of police, serving as Joint Commissioner of Police, Hyderabad City Police in the departments of Administration and Special Branch. This was during the Commissionerates of A. K. Mohanty, IPS, Balwinder Singh, IPS and B. Prasada Rao, IPS. In 2011, he moved to the Vigilance and Enforcement Department. The same year, in 2011, he was promoted as Inspector-general of police, overseeing Guntur range. In the ensuing year in 2012, he was moved to Legal department. In 2013, Harish Kumar was re-assigned Law and Order Department. During 2013 Meghalaya Legislative Assembly election, Harish Kumar Gupta was Special Observer on behalf of the Election Commission of India to Ampati Assembly constituency in Meghalaya.

=== Andhra Pradesh ===
With the bifurcation of Andhra Pradesh in 2014, Harish Kumar preferred Telangana cadre. Based on a ratio of allocation arrived upon by the Government of India, he was retained in the residual Andhra Pradesh. However, Harish Kumar contested his allocation before the Central Administrative Tribunal, urging it to allot him to Telangana cadre. His Lawyer Jonnalagadda Sudheer found fault with the allocation list, raising issues over the cadre allocation.

In the residuary Andhra Pradesh, Harish Kumar continued to hold the position of inspector-general of police in the Departments of Law and Order and Technical Services from 2014 until 2017. He was then promoted as additional director general of police. From 2017 to 2022 he headed the Departments of Law and Order, Provisioning and Logistics and Home Guards. During this period, he was also designated as Nodal Police Officer at the service of students from Jammu and Kashmir (state) facing difficulty. In 2020, during the COVID-19 pandemic in India, he became Chairperson, State Level Police Recruitment Board

In early 2022 Harish Kumar got promoted as Director general of police, heading the Railways for a month. He then became Principal Secretary (Home), also holding full additional charge of Prisons and Correctional Services w.e.f. from 19 May 2022.

With prisons in India in need of reformation, Harish Kumar took the onus of implementing changes in line with directions of the Supreme Court of India in the matter of special remission to life convicts. A regional training skill centre was set up in Rajahmundry Central Prison for skill development of inmates. During the 8th National Conference of Heads of Prisons of all States and Union Territories held in the port city of Visakhapatnam on 11 and 12 September 2023, Harish Kumar oversaw the arrangements for the conduct of the programme, held jointly by the Bureau of Police Research and Development and the Andhra Pradesh Police. He also addressed the delegates in the presence of Balaji Srivastav, IPS and Ravi Joseph Lokku, IPS of the Bureau of Police Research and Development. In matters of inhuman conditions prevailing in Prisons in India, with special reference to those in the districts of Andhra Pradesh, Harish Kumar initiated the process of expansion of jails. To promote Recidivism, Harish Kumar involved inmates of Nellore Central Prison in fabricating racks for storing Electronic Voting Machines in strong rooms during the conduction of simultaneous 2024 Indian general election and the 2024 Andhra Pradesh Legislative Assembly election.

On 6 May 2024, on the directions of Election Commission of India, he became the Head of Police Force of Andhra Pradesh Police. He had been appointed on the advice of Election Commission of India. Harish Kumar Gupta's short-term appointment as Director General of Police (Head of Police Force) of Andhra Pradesh Police came at a crucial juncture when Andhra Pradesh went for simultaneous elections, both to the 2024 Indian general election and the 2024 Andhra Pradesh Legislative Assembly election on 13 May 2024. His elevation, barely a week before the elections had raised eyebrows, what with the opposition parties accusing his batchmate and predecessor K. V. Rajendranath Reddy, IPS of being partisan. After more than a month of being assigned the position of HoPF, Harish Kumar Gupta was re-assigned as Principal Secretary (Home) w.e.f. 19 June 2024 and a new Head of Police Force, Ch. D. Tirumala Rao, IPS, belonging to the 43rd Regular Recruit batch was appointed in his place.

== Awards and medals ==
As part of his service, Harish Kumar also won some medals, these include:

- Ati Utkrisht Seva Padak (2018)
- President's Police Medal for Distinguished Service (2018)
- Police Medal for Meritorious Service (2009)

Police appointments
| Preceded by K. V. Rajendranath Reddy, IPS; Ch. D. Tirumala Rao, IPS | Director General of Police (Head of Police Force), Andhra Pradesh Police; 6 May 2024 to 19 June 2024, 31 January 2025 to present | Succeeded by Ch. D. Tirumala Rao, IPS; Incumbent |
| Preceded by Kolli Raghuram Reddy, IPS | Inspector General and Director General and ex officio Principal Secretary (Vigilance & Enforcement), General Administration Department, Government of Andhra Pradesh; 11 July 2024 to Present | Succeeded by Incumbent |
| Preceded by Kumar Vishwajeet, IPS | Principal Secretary (Home), Government of Andhra Pradesh; 18 May 2022 to 11 July 2024 | Succeeded by Kumar Vishwajeet, IPS |
| Preceded by Nidigattu Sanjay, IPS | Additional Director General of Police, Criminal Investigation Department; Andhra Pradesh Police; 8 June 2024 to 28 June 2024 | Succeeded by Ravi Shankar Ayyanar, IPS |
