= Visakhapatnam City Police =

Police department in Visakhapatnam

- Motto: Vision Service Protection

Agency overview
- Formed: 1983; 43 years ago

Jurisdictional structure
- Operations jurisdiction: Visakhapatnam, Andhra Pradesh, India
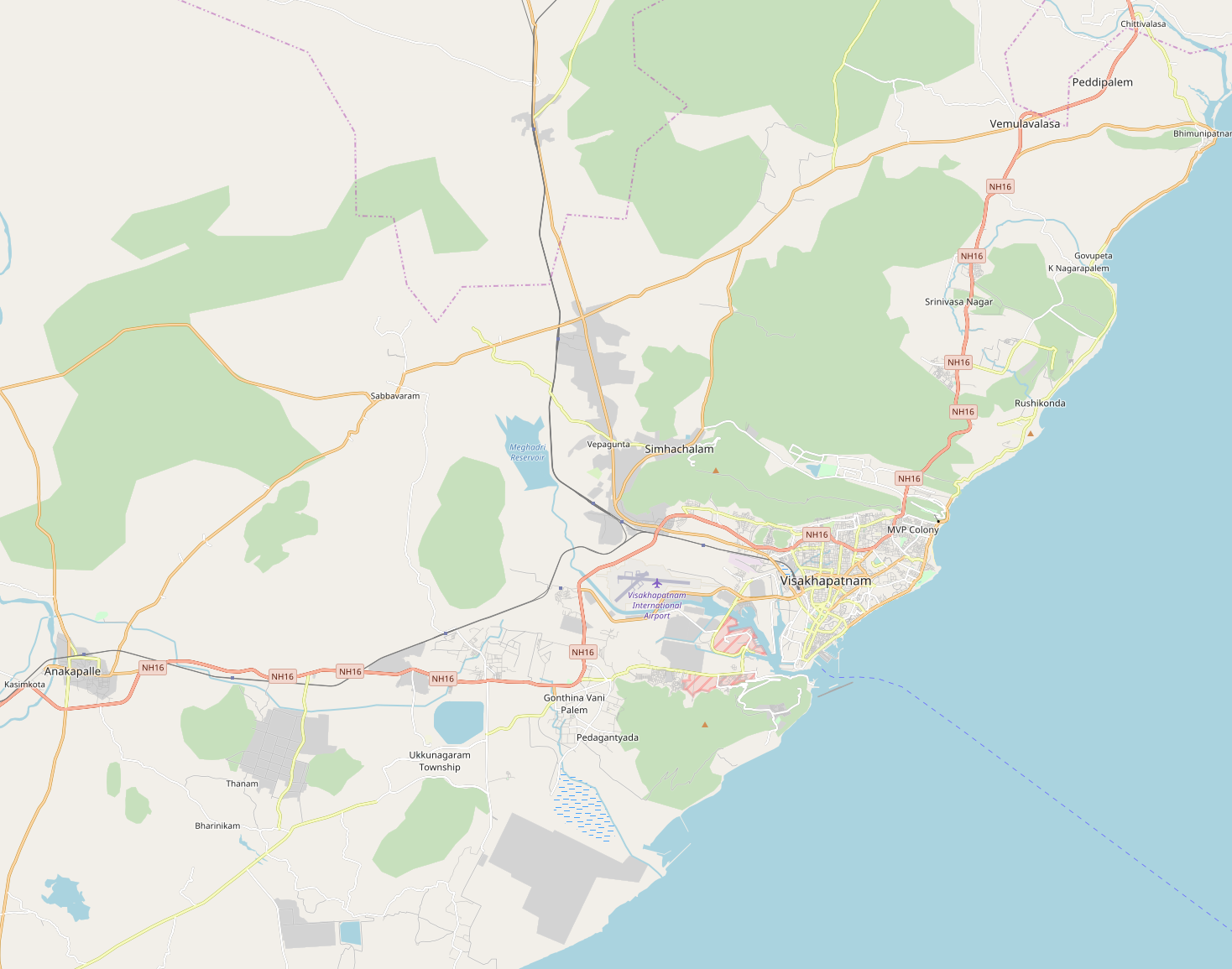
- Visakhapatnam Police jurisdictional area
- Legal jurisdiction: Visakhapatnam

Operational structure
- Headquarters: Visakhapatnam City Police, Suryabagh, Visakhapatnam, Andhra Pradesh - 530020
- Agency executive: Shanka Brata Bagchi, IPS, Commissioner
- Parent agency: Andhra Pradesh Police

Website
- Official website

The Visakhapatnam City Police is the local law enforcement agency for the city of Visakhapatnam, Andhra Pradesh and is headed by the city police commissioner. Visakhapatnam City police are also informally called the Vizag City Police.

== Organizational structure ==
The Visakhapatnam Police Commissionerate is headed by a commissioner of police and one joint commissioner of police there are 2 Divisions and 6 Sub-Divisions and each division consists of a Deputy commissioner of Police and Assistant Commissioner of Police with particular number of police stations.

=== Hierarchy ===
- Commissioner of Police (CP)
  (ADGP Rank)
- Joint Commissioner of Police (Jt.CP)
  (DIG Rank)
- Deputy Commissioner of Police (DCP)
  (SP Rank)
- Additional Deputy Commissioner of Police (Addl.DCP)
  (Addl.SP Rank)
- Assistant Commissioner of Police (ACP)
  (ASP/DSP Rank)
- Inspector of Police (Insp.)
- Sub-Inspector of Police (SI)
- Assistant Sub-Inspector of Police (ASI)
- Head Constable (HC)
- Police Constable (PC)

== Structure ==
The Visakhapatnam City Police has 2 Divisions and 6 Sub Divisions.

- Visakhapatnam 1
- Visakhapatnam 2

Sub Divisions

- East Sub Division
- West Sub Division
- South Sub Division
- North Sub Division
- Harbour Sub Division
- Dwaraka Sub Division

== Command Control Centre ==
Visakhapatnam Police have a command Control Centre with this, the city police can monitor whole city.
