= Puducherry Police =

Puducherry Police Police de Pondichéry
- Official logo of Puducherry Police
- Abbreviation: PP

Jurisdictional structure
- Operations jurisdiction: Puducherry, IN
- Jurisdiction of Puducherry Police force
- Legal jurisdiction: State of Puducherry
- Governing body: Ministry of Home Affairs, Government of India
- General nature: Local civilian police

Operational structure
- Headquarters: Mahe de Labourdonnais St, White Town, Puducherry, 605001
- Elected officer responsible: Amit Shah, Ministry of Home Affairs
- Agency executive: Shri Manoj Kumar Lal, IPS, Director general of police

Website
- police.py.gov.in

The Puducherry Police (French: Police de Pondichéry) is the law enforcement agency for the Union Territory of Puducherry in India.

== Origins ==
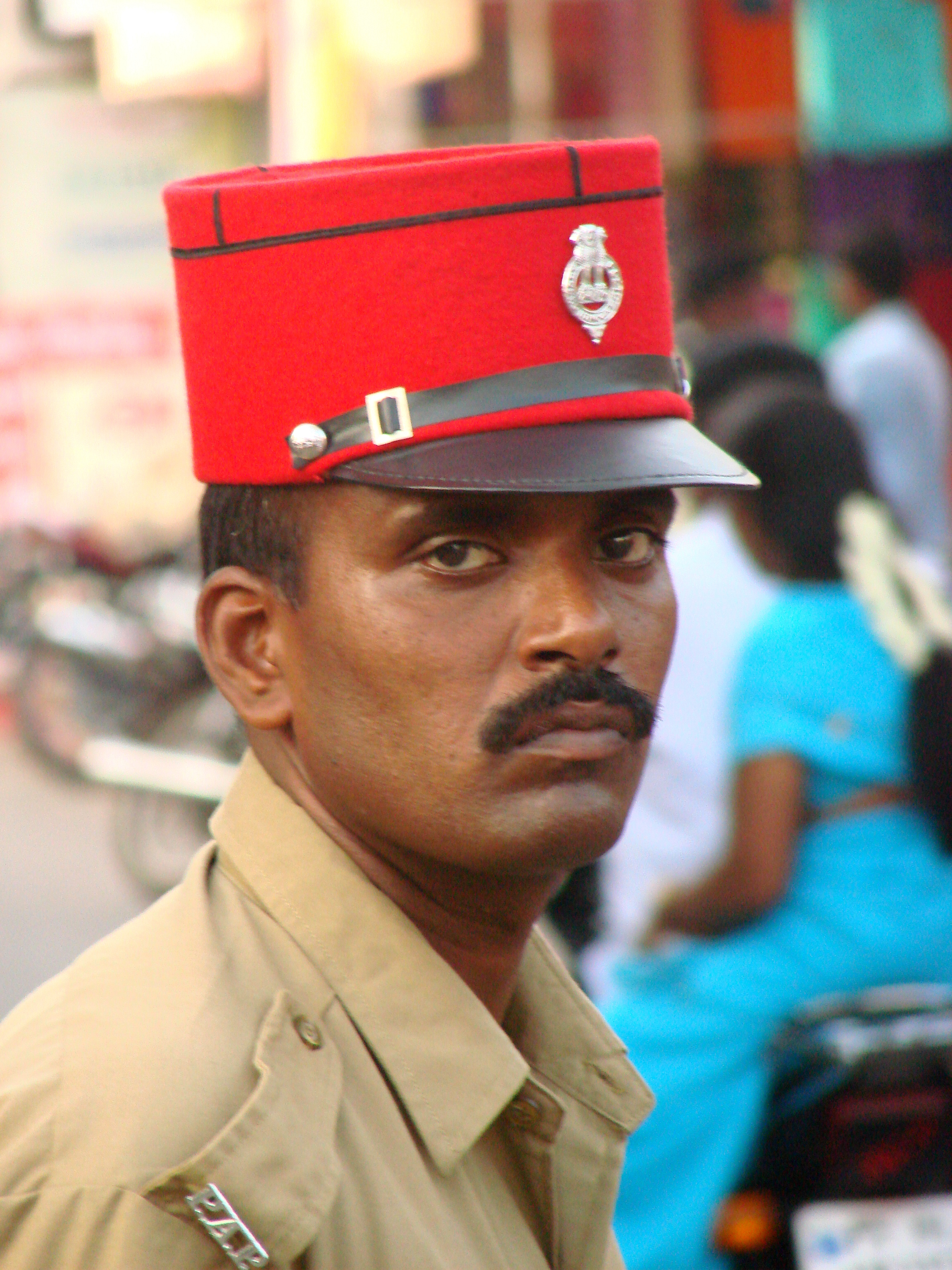
Puducherry constable wearing a red Kepi

The Puducherry Police date back to the period of French colonial rule prior to 1954. Separate Armed and Indigenous (local) police units were maintained at that time.

In India, during the French colonial rule of Pondicherry, Yanam, Karaikal and Mahé, Kepis were worn by two kinds of policemen, the Armed and the Indigenous, differentiated by the color of the kepis they wore. While the law and order forces wore bright red caps, the armed constabulary was conspicuous by its blue kepis. After Indian Independence, the former French colonial territory was integrated into the Union Territory of Puducherry and the bright red kepi continues to be the headgear of the constabulary—both for the local and the armed police signifying the cultural and administrative legacies left by the former colonialists.

The modern force still retains the French kepi as a distinctive feature of its uniform.

== Organizational structure ==
The Puducherry Police come under the direct control of the Ministry of Home Affairs, Government of India. The force is headed by the Director General of Police (DGP).

As of 2013, the Puducherry Police had around 4000 personnel, of whom 150 were women. The force plans to induct more women officers to have one woman officer at every police station.

=== Hierarchy ===
- Director general of police (DGP)
- Additional Director general of police (ADGP)
- Inspector general of police (IGP)
- Deputy inspector general of police (DIG)
- Senior superintendent of police (SSP)
- Superintendent of police (SP)
- Deputy superintendent of police (DSP)
- Inspector of Police (Insp)
- Sub-inspector of police (SI)
- Assistant sub-inspector of police (ASI)
- Head constable (HC)
- Police constable (PC)

== Jurisdiction ==
The Puducherry Police has jurisdiction over Puducherry, Yanam, Karaikal, and Mahé.

== Duties ==
The Puducherry Police coordinates with other law enforcement agencies across the country to catch offenders and criminals.

The force has prisons in Kalapet, Yanam and Karaikal. It has plans to open an open prison. It is the only force having a separate traffic unit with investigation power in India.
