= Noel Swaranjit Sen =

Indian police chief

Policeman Noel Swaranjit Sen Indian Police Service (Retired)
- Born: Noel Swaranjit Sen; 24 December 1946 (age 79); West Bengal
- Other name: Noel
- Education: B. A. (Delhi)
- Alma mater: Doon School, Dehradun, St. Stephen's College, Delhi
- Known for: Combating terrorist tactics of Naxalites
- Notable work: Special Protection Force (SPF)
- Police career
- Country: India, 1967 - 1973 (5th Short Service Commission of Indian Army)
- Department: Andhra Pradesh Cadre
- Service years: Indian Police Service, July 8, 1973 - December 31, 2006
- Status: Retired
- Rank: Deputy Superintendent of Police, Superintendent of Police (1981-1984), Deputy Inspector General of Police, Inspector General of Police, Additional Director General of Police , Director-General and Inspector-General of Police (2004-2006)
- Badge no.: 19683038
- Awards: Sword of Honour (Indian Army)
- Other work: Promoting the cause of regularization of private security service guards
- Website: https://senandsenconsultants.com/our-team/

Noel Swaranjit Sen (born 24 December 1946) is a retired Indian Police Service Policeman of 1968 batch. He was Director-General and Inspector-General of Police (DGP) in the state of Andhra Pradesh, India. After a stint with the Indian Army (Short Service Commission) in the 1960s, he became an Officer of the Indian Police Service. He was also a Commandant of the 1st Battalion of Border Security Force. When serving as the Director General of Police (DGP) of Andhra Pradesh, Sen became well known for his creative response to a reporter's question about how Naxal combing operations were conducted. In a memorable moment, he took a comb from his pocket and combed his hair to demonstrate the process when asked about combing.

== Personal life ==
Swaranjit Sen was born on Christmas Eve in 1946 and hails from West Bengal and pursued scholastic and collegiate studies at notable academic institutions in India. He was at The Doon School, Dehradun from where he graduated in 1965. This was the time when John A. K. Martyn was the Head Master of the School. For collegiate studies, he moved to St. Stephen's College, Delhi when Satish Chandra Circar was the Principal. Sen pursued graduate studies leading to B. A.

== Career ==
=== Indian Army (5th Short Service Commission) ===
Swaranjit enrolled for the 5th Short Service Commission of the Indian Army in 1967 serving between 1968 and 1973. He also took part in the military operations in the Indo-Pakistani War of 1971, which were led by none other than Sam Manekshaw. By 1973, Swaranjit opted out of military service and moved to policing joining the Indian Police Service on July 8, 1973. However, his earlier service in the Indian Army has been given due credence. His service in the IPS has been counted from 1968.

=== Indian Police Service (1968 batch) ===
It was in 1973 that Swaranjit Sen moved to the Indian Police Service. He was allotted the Andhra Pradesh cadre and belonged to the 1968 batch. He was Superintendent of Police in Kurnool district and Guntur district. Swaranjit Sen also had moved on central deputation serving as Commandant of the 1st Battalion of the Border Security Force in Jammu and Kashmir.

Sen rose from the ranks of the police force and finally headed the Andhra Pradesh State Police Force. He was made Director General and Inspector General of Police on 31 December 2004, a post in which he served for two years until his retirement on attaining superannuation on 31 December 2006. His predecessor was S.R. Sukumara. It was during then Chief Minister Y. S. Rajasekhara Reddy's tenure that he was appointed as DGP. By that time, he was already serving as Home Secretary.

Swaranjit has been credited with the creation of Special Protection Force (SPF) and had conducted many fire safety drills during his tenure as Inspector-General of Fire Services. An expert in tackling Naxalism, he has been invited by other states who have taken police action against the group. A Christian, he has also been active in advocating for minority rights in India

== Post-retirement ==
Swaranjit Sen was made Chairperson of Andhra Pradesh Tourism Development Corporation. In 2014, Swaranjit Sen was honoured for his integrity and service during the centennial celebrations of the National Council of Churches in India held at the nearly-ecumenical Andhra Christian Theological College, Secunderabad.

Police appointments
Preceded by S. R. Sukumara	Director-General and Inspector-General of Police, Andhra Pradesh; 31 December 2004 – 31 December 2006	Succeeded by M. A. Basith
