= H. J. Dora =

Indian police chief (1943–2026)

- Born: 1943; Srikakulam district, Madras Province, British India
- Died: 13 March 2026 (aged 83); Hyderabad, Telangana, India
- Employer: Government of India
- Organization: Indian Police Service

H. J. Dora (1943 – 13 March 2026) was an Indian police chief who was the 1965 batch IPS officer of Andhra Pradesh cadre, the Director General of Police, Andhra Pradesh, and Vigilance Commissioner for the Government of India. Dora joined the Indian Police Service in 1965 and was allotted to Andhra Pradesh Cadre. After serving as an additional D.G. of Police (C.I.D.), in Andhra Pradesh, he was promoted to the Director General of Police for the State in 1996. In 2002, he went on deputation as Director General of Police to the Central Industrial Security Force (CISF) in New Delhi. He also served as the president of Indian Olympic Weight Lifting Association and was also the Chef-de-mission of the Indian contingent to the 2006 Commonwealth Games. In 1993, Dora was one of the 40-odd policemen marked for death by the People's War Group (PWG).

Dora was the recipient of President's police medal for Distinguished Services, Police Medal for Meritorious services, and Police Medal of Gallantry.

== Early life ==
Dora was born in 1943 in a Telugu speaking Kalinga family of Srikakulam district, Madras Province. After completing his Master's degree in Economics from Andhra University in Vishakhapatnam, he joined the Indian Police Service in 1965.

== Career ==
From 1989 to late 1992, he served as the Vice-Chairman and Managing Director of the Andhra Pradesh State Road Transport Corporation. He later served as Commissioner of Police, Hyderabad and as Director General and Inspector-general of police, Andhra Pradesh. He served as a police officer in various districts including Anantapur, Karimnagar, and Krishna through 1984. After that, he served with the police intelligence for five years. He also worked as Director General, Central Industrial Security Force, Delhi and as Vigilance Commissioner, Central Vigilance Commission.

Dora joined the GMR group in 2006 as security adviser of the Delhi International Airport during the privatization transition after retiring from the police service.

He was also closely involved as an administrator with the hockey federation. He was a former president of the Hyderabad Hockey Association and the Andhra Pradesh Olympic Association.

== Death ==
Dora died in Hyderabad on 13 March 2026, at the age of 83.

== Books ==
- Dora, Hec Je (2012). Impact of Training on the Performance of IPS Officers. SVP National Police Academy.
- Dora, Hec. Je (2011). Enṭīārtō nēnu. Haidarābād: Emeskōbuks. ISBN 9789380409948.
- Dora, Hec. Je (2019). Journey through turbulent times : an autobiography. Bengaluru. ISBN 9789388478410.
