= Suryabagh =

- Neighbourhood
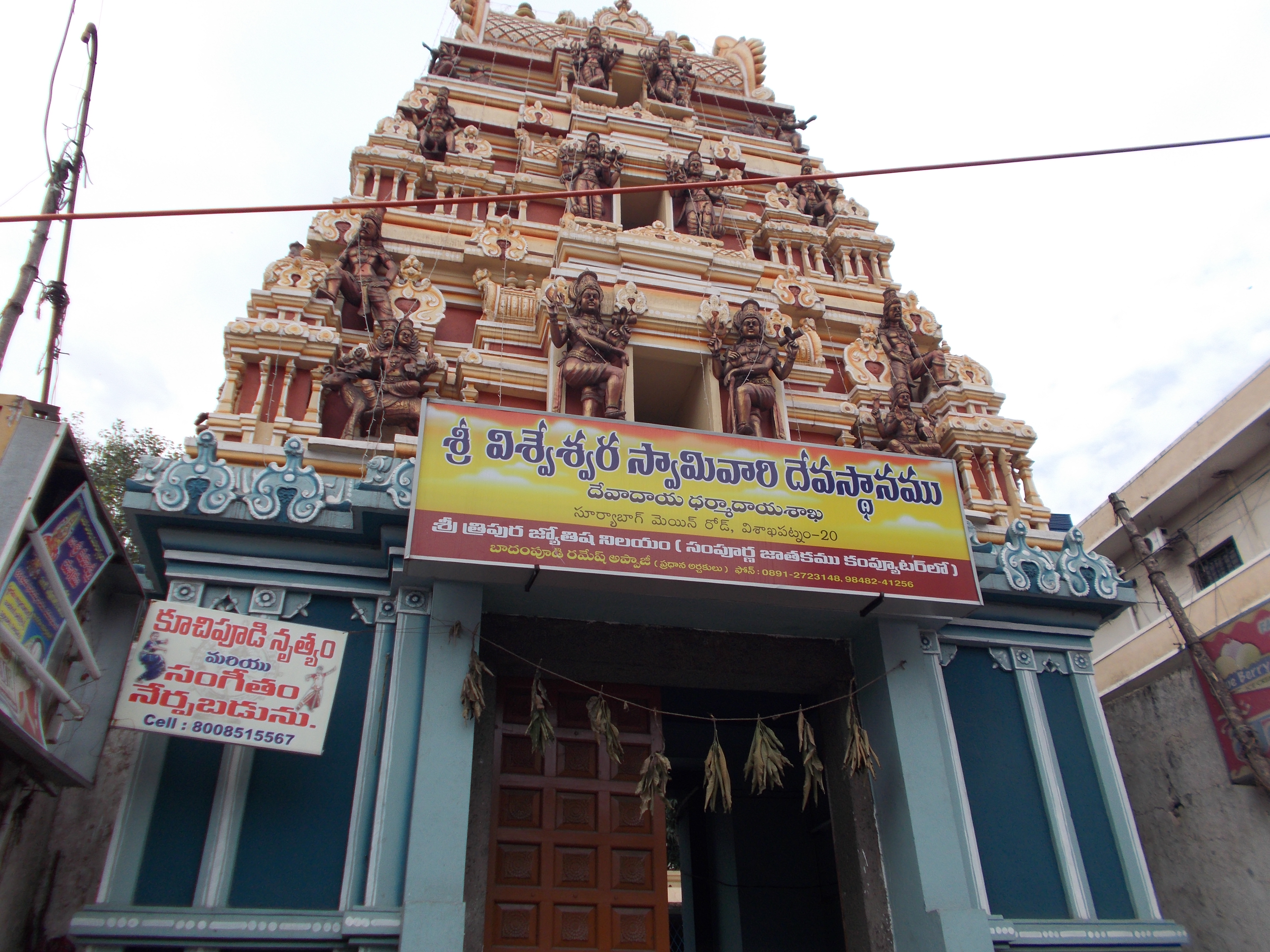
- Visweswara Swamy vari temple Gopuram at Suryabagh

- Location in Visakhapatnam
- Coordinates: 17.712202°N 83.299386°E
- Country: India
- State: Andhra Pradesh
- District: Visakhapatnam

Government
  - Body: Greater Visakhapatnam Municipal Corporation

Languages
  - Official: Telugu
- Time zone: UTC+5:30 (IST)
- PIN: 530020
- Vehicle registration: AP

Suryabagh is one of the old suburbs in Visakhapatnam, Andhra Pradesh, India, close to, Jagadamba Centre. Suryabagh is the hub of electronics and hardware shops.

The Visakhapatnam City Police Commissioner's office is located in Suryabagh. Visakhi Jala Vudhyanavanam is also located here. This is a junction of old town and new city.

== Transport ==
The APSRTC has a major bus hub in this area and connects Suryabagh with all parts of the city and some suburban villages.

== Commercial area ==
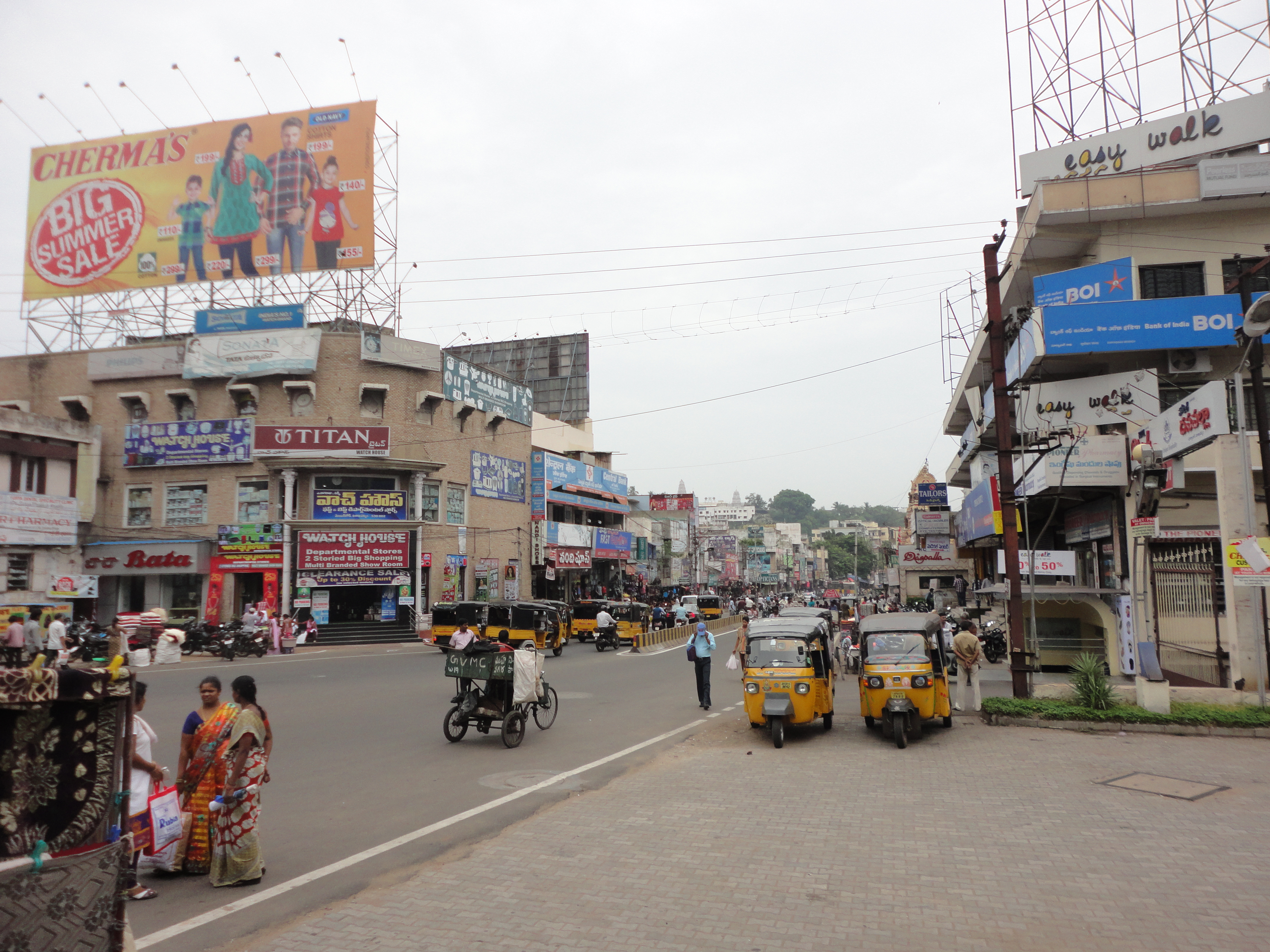
Suryabagh Road

There are many shops. This area is a hub for electronics and hardware. Many movie theatres are situated here. Visakhapatnam Central Shopping mall is located in this area.
