= Nanduri Samba Siva Rao =

Indian police officer

Nanduri Sambasiva Rao
- Born: 13 December 1957 (age 68)
- Education: B.Tech, Mechanical - Marine Engineering, M.Tech, Mechanical Engineering & Thermal Sciences
- Alma mater: Andhra University, Vishakapatnam Indian Institute of Technology, Kanpur
- Successor: Dr. M. Malakondaiah
- Spouse: Uma Kumari Nanduri
- Children: 2
- Parent: Nanduri Ramakotaiah Nanduri Anasuyamma
- Awards: Indian Police Medal, 2000 President Police Medal, 2010

Nanduri Samba Siva Rao (born 1957) served as an Indian Police Service officer (RR: 1984 Batch) from 19 December 1984 – 31 December 2017. He secured AIR ( All India Rank) of 136 in UPSC with Physics and Mechanical Engineering as major subjects. He served as the Director general of police (HoPF - Head of Police Force) of Andhra Pradesh. Prior to DGP, he was vice-chairman, Managing Director of APSRTC where he was known for implementing revolutionary changes and improved customer service vastly. He was also the Director General of State Disaster Response and Fire Services in the undivided Andhra Pradesh from 2013 to 2015. He is widely known for his Project Management, Investigation Analysis and Motivational Talks. He was awarded Indian Police Medal in 2000, for his impeccable service in counter-insurgency (Antrik Suraksha Sevapathak) operations. In 2010, on the occasion of Republic day, he received the President Police Medal, for his distinguished service. He believes in "Continuous Improvement" and "Everyday Learning".

== Personal life ==
Sambasiva Rao was born on 13 December 1957, in Ongole, Prakasam District. He is the fourth and youngest child of Sri. Ramakotaiah Nanduri and Smt. Ansuyamma Nanduri. His father, who was a school teacher, played an important role in his education. Rao studied at Municipal Elementary School, followed by high school education in PVR High School, Ongole, Prakasam District. To date he has very high regards for his teachers Mr. Balakrishna Murthy, Mr. Ramakrishna and Mr. Uma Maheshwar Rao who created the zeal to excel in mathematics and physics. He completed his intermediate education from CSR Sharma College, Ongole. He was gold medalist in mechanical engineering from College of Engineering Andhra University, 1979. He later went on to pursue Masters in Technology in mechanical engineering and thermal sciences from IIT, Kanpur 1982. It was during this time when he started preparing for Union Public Service Commission Examination, where he secured an All India Rank of 136 in 1984 and subsequently allotted Andhra Pradesh cadre. He married his childhood friend Uma Kumari Nanduri in the same year and has two daughters.

== Posting Particulars ==
S.No.	Place of posting	Rank	Designation	From Date	To Date	Period Yr - Mnth
1	Adilabad – Bellampalli(SD)	ASP	ASP	05/02/1987	08/02/1989	2 - 0
2	Nizamabad	Addl.SP	Addl.SP	12/02/1989	12/04/1989	0 -2
3	Medak	SP	SP	18/04/1989	22/01/1992	2 - 9
4	Ranga Reddy	SP	SP	26/01/1992	07/05/1993	1 - 3
5	Guntur	SP	SP	10/05/1993	04/01/1995	1 - 8
6	Hyderabad City CAR Hqrs	SP	DCP	12/01/1995	25/01/1996	1 – 0
7	Mahaboobnagar	SP	SP	26/01/1996	03/11/1997	1 - 9
8	Intelligence	SP	SP	05/11/1997	01/08/1998	0 – 9
9	Intelligence	DIG	DIG	02/08/1998	17/06/2000	1 – 10
10	Hyderabad Range	DIG	DIG	17/06/2000	27/01/2003	2 – 7
11	CID	DIG	DIG	27/01/2003	31/03/2003	0 – 2
12	CID	IGP	IGP	01/04/2003	13/06/2005	2 – 2
13	Police Hqrs, AP R.Seema Regn Hqrs, KNL Camp	IGP	IGP	13/06/2005	14/06/2007	2 – 0
14	Visakhapatnam City	IGP	Commissioner of Police	17/06/2007	19/03/2010	2 – 9
15	A.P.Police Academy, Hyd	ADGP	Director	22/03/2010	25/05/2013	3 – 2
16	Director General, State Disaster Response and Fire Services, A.P., Hyd.	ADGP	Director General	27/05/2013	22/01/2015	1 – 7
17	Vice Chairman & Managing Director, APSRTC	Vice Chairman & Managing Director	Vice Chairman & Managing Director	23/01/2015	22/07/2016	1-6
18	Director General of Police Andhra Pradesh	DGP	In Charge DGP (HoPF)	23/07/2016	27/12/2017	1-5
19	Director General of Police Andhra Pradesh	DGP	DGP (HoPF)	27/12/2017	31/12/2017	4 Days

== Interests ==
He enjoys reading, playing tennis and gardening.
