= Director general of police =

Highest police rank in India

Director General of Respective States and Union Territories Police Force
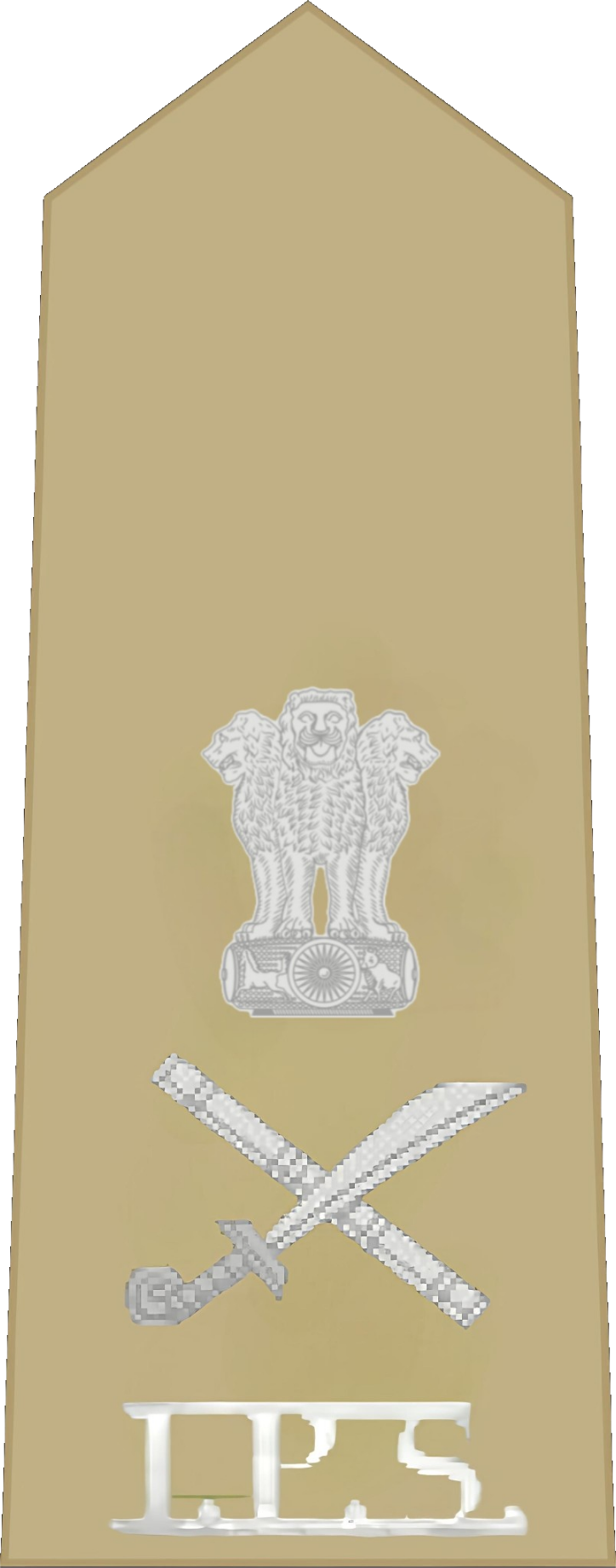
- Shoulder Rank of DGP

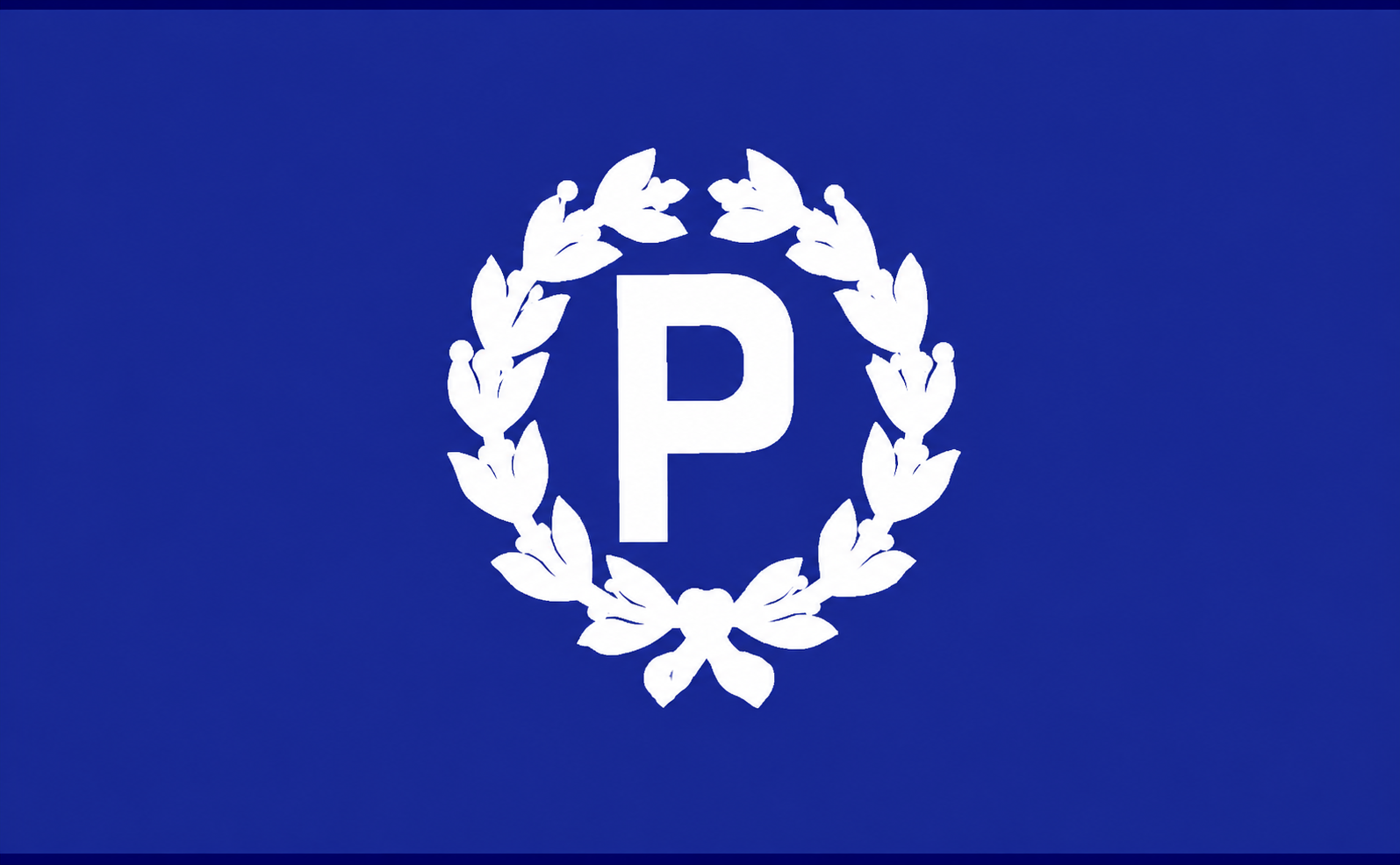
- Car Flag for Director General of Police

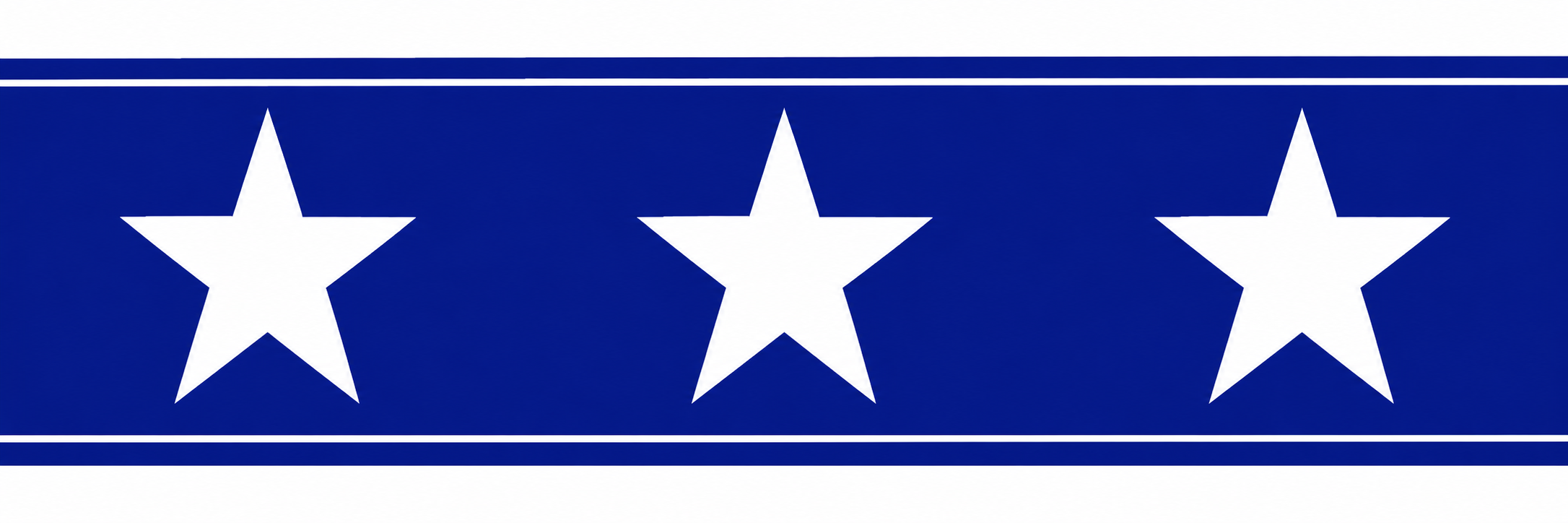
- Star Plate for Police Vehicle
- Police department
- Status: Head of Police Force of States and Union Territories of India
- Abbreviation: DGP
- Member of: Indian Police Service
- Reports to: Minister for Home Affairs of the State Government; Home Secretary of the State/UT Government; (Home Department of the concerned State/UT Govt.)
- Residence: Respective Police Headquarters of States and Union Territories of India
- Nominator: Union Public Service Commission
- Appointer: Respective cabinet of States And Union Territories of India
- Term length: 2 years; (minimum)
- Deputy: Additional Director General of Police (Addl. DGP)
- Salary: • ₹225,000 (US$2,300) (monthly)

The Director General of Police (DGP) is the highest-ranking police officer in Indian states and union territories. The DGP is appointed by the cabinet and holds a three-star rank. In many states, there are multiple officers holding the rank of Director General of Police (DGP) as per Union government norms. Among them, one officer is typically appointed as the Head of the Police Force, serving as the Director General of Police (DGP) of the state. Other DGP-ranked officers often head separate departments like Prisons, Anti-Corruption Bureau, Fire and Rescue Services, or have independent charge of police units, functioning separately from the State DGP.

The DGP is responsible for overseeing the entire police force and law enforcement activities within their respective jurisdiction. This position holds significant authority and plays a crucial role in maintaining law and order, implementing crime prevention strategies, and ensuring public safety. The DGP is usually appointed by the state government and works closely with other law enforcement agencies and government officials to uphold the rule of law and protect citizens' rights.

== Appointment of Director General of Police ==
The appointment of the Director General of Police (Head of Police Force) in Indian states and union territories follows a structured process mandated by the Supreme Court of India, primarily based on the directives issued in the landmark Prakash Singh case of 2006. These directives aim to ensure transparency, meritocracy, and stability in the leadership of state police forces. The Director General of Police is designated as the head of the police department for all administrative and operational purposes.

=== Supreme Court Directives ===
In the Prakash Singh case, the Supreme Court issued several directives to reform the police appointment process, emphasizing the need for a transparent and merit-based selection system. Key aspects of these directives include:

- Consultation with UPSC: State governments are required to consult the Union Public Service Commission (UPSC) before appointing a DGP. This consultation involves sending the names of eligible officers to the UPSC at least three months before the incumbent DGP's retirement.
- Preparation of Panel: The UPSC prepares a panel of three officers deemed fit for the DGP position based on seniority, service record, and range of experience. This panel is then sent back to the state government, which is required to appoint one of the shortlisted officers as the DGP.
- Minimum Tenure: The selected DGP is mandated to have a minimum tenure of at least two years, irrespective of their date of superannuation. This provision aims to provide stability and continuity in police leadership.
- Eligibility Criteria: Only officers with a minimum of 30 years of service and holding the rank of Additional Director General (ADG) or equivalent are considered for the DGP position. Additionally, officers must have at least six months of service left before retirement at the time of their empanelment.
- No Acting DGPs: The Supreme Court has explicitly rejected the practice of appointing "Acting DGPs," requiring states to appoint a permanent DGP to ensure stable leadership.

=== Other appointments ===
When a state or union territory (UT) cadre has more than one director general (DG)-ranked officer, one of them is appointed as the Director General of Police (DGP), who serves as the head of the police force (HoPF). The remaining DG-ranked officers in a state or UT may be appointed to various positions outside of the police department, such as Director General of Prisons and Correctional Services, Director General of Fire and Rescue Services, Director General of the Anti-Corruption Bureau, Traffic and Road Safety Commissioner, Excise Commissioner, or heads of state public sector undertakings. Alternatively, they may be appointed to commensurate positions in various central police organizations or agencies under the union government.

In the Union Government, officers of DGP rank serve as heads of major central police forces and intelligence and security agencies such as IB, CBI, R&AW, NIA, CRPF, BSF, CISF, ITBP, SSB, NSG, SPG, NDRF, NCB, and RPF. They also lead directorates related to civil defence, fire services, and internal security, playing a key role in national law enforcement and security.

DGP-rank Positions in States and Union Territories
Designation	Role	Ministry/Department
Director General of Police (DGP)	Head of the police force (HoPF) in the state/UT	Home Department
Director General of Prisons and Correctional Services	Oversees prison administration and correctional services	Home / Prisons Department
Director General of Fire and Rescue Services	Leads fire and emergency services	Home / Fire Services Department
Director General of Anti-Corruption Bureau	Heads anti-corruption efforts in the state	Vigilance / Home Department
Transport / Road Safety Commissioner	Manages traffic enforcement and road safety	Transport Department
Excise Commissioner	Oversees enforcement of excise laws and revenue collection, and prohibition, narcotics, etc.	Excise Department / Finance Department
Head of State Public Sector Undertaking	Leads a state-owned enterprise	Concerned Line Department / PSU Ministry
Deputation to Central Agencies	Assigned to central police or intelligence organizations	Union Government (various ministries)

DGP-rank Positions in the Union Government
Designation	Role	Ministry
Director, Intelligence Bureau (IB)	Heads domestic intelligence	Ministry of Home Affairs
Director, Central Bureau of Investigation (CBI)	Leads central crime investigation	Ministry of Personnel, Public Grievances and Pensions (DoPT)
Secretary, Research and Analysis Wing (R&AW)	Heads foreign intelligence operations	Cabinet Secretariat
Director General, National Investigation Agency (NIA)	Leads anti-terror investigations	Ministry of Home Affairs
Director General, Central Reserve Police Force (CRPF)	Commands the largest central armed police force	Ministry of Home Affairs
Director General, Border Security Force (BSF)	Guards India's borders	Ministry of Home Affairs
Director General, Central Industrial Security Force (CISF)	Provides security to public sector undertakings	Ministry of Home Affairs
Director General, Indo-Tibetan Border Police (ITBP)	Protects the India-China border	Ministry of Home Affairs
Director General, Sashastra Seema Bal (SSB)	Secures borders with Nepal and Bhutan	Ministry of Home Affairs
Director General, National Security Guard (NSG)	Handles counter-terrorism and hostage rescue	Ministry of Home Affairs
Director, Special Protection Group (SPG)	Provides security to the Prime Minister and former PMs	Cabinet Secretariat
Director General, National Disaster Response Force (NDRF)	Leads disaster response operations	Ministry of Home Affairs
Director General, Narcotics Control Bureau (NCB)	Manages drug law enforcement	Ministry of Home Affairs
Director General, Railway Protection Force (RPF)	Ensures security of Indian Railways	Ministry of Railways
Director General, Civil Defence / Fire Services / Internal Security	Oversees civil protection and internal security	Ministry of Home Affairs

== Salary ==
The pay matrix for Director General of Police (DGP) ranked officers comprises Pay Level 17, the apex grade, and Pay Level 16. The Head of Police Force or State Police Chief, holding the rank of DGP, receives a monthly fixed salary of ₹225,000, excluding allowances. This salary scale is also applicable to Directors General (DGs) of some Central Police Organisations at the Union government level.

For other DG ranked officers within state governments eligible for Pay Level 16, including DG of Prisons, DG of Fire and Rescue, DG of Civil Defence and Home Guards, DG of Anti-Corruption Bureau, or equivalent posts, the monthly pay ranges from ₹205,400 to ₹224,400, exclusive of allowances.

In November 2022, the government approved a proposal to grant apex scale salary to the Directors of Intelligence Bureau (IB) and the Central Bureau of Investigation (CBI), ensuring they receive salaries at par with Secretary-rank Indian Administrative Service (IAS) officers, irrespective of seniority.

== Insignia and Uniform ==
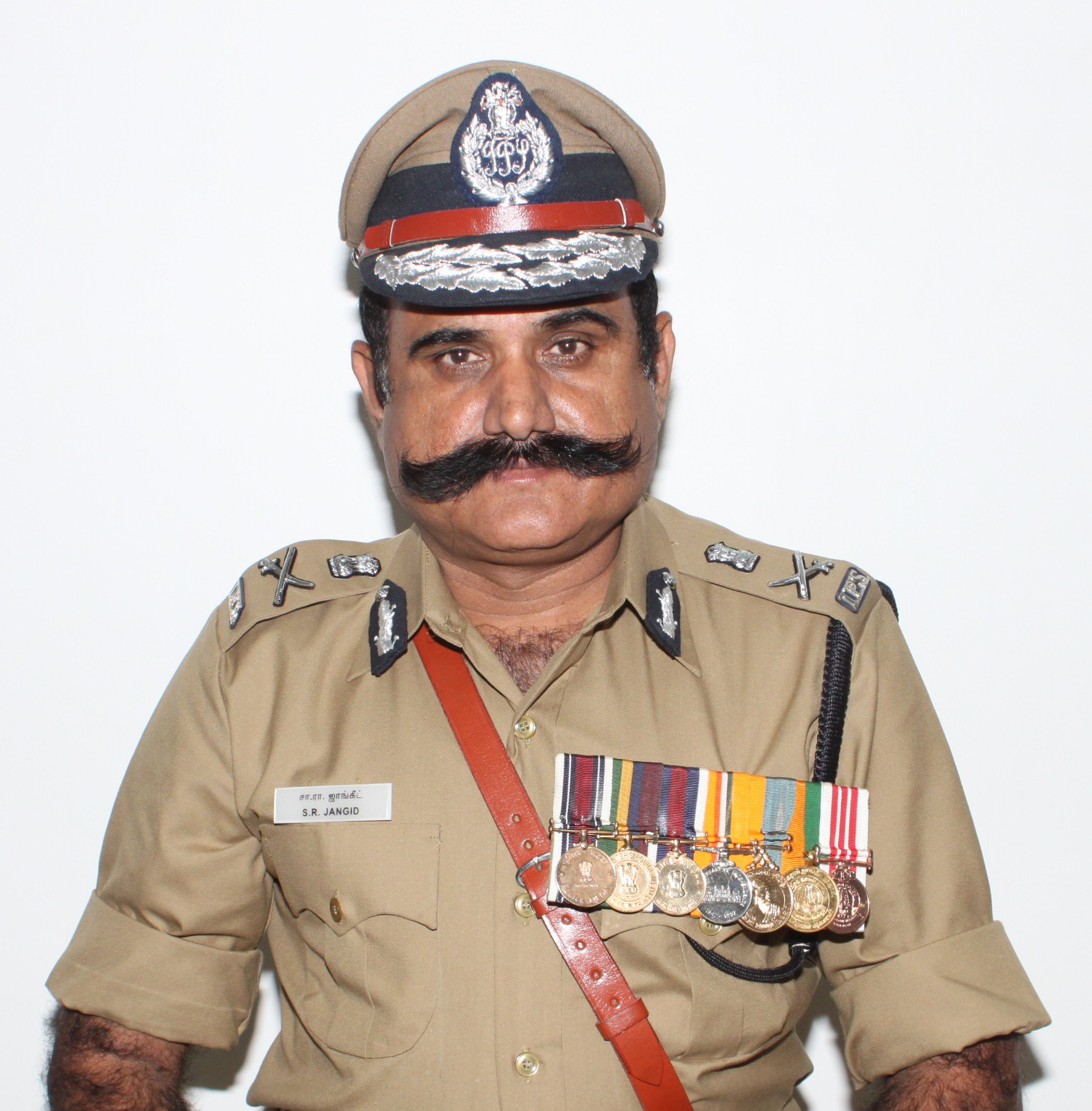
S R. Jangid, IPS, former DGP of Tamil Nadu in uniform

DGP-ranked officers wear Gorget patches on their collars, which feature a dark blue background with an oak leaf pattern stitched on it, similar to those worn by Additional Directors General (ADGs) and Inspectors General (IGs). The insignia and uniform are the same as those of the DGP for both Special DGPs and Additional DGPs.

== List of current Chiefs of Police Forces in the States and Union territories of India ==
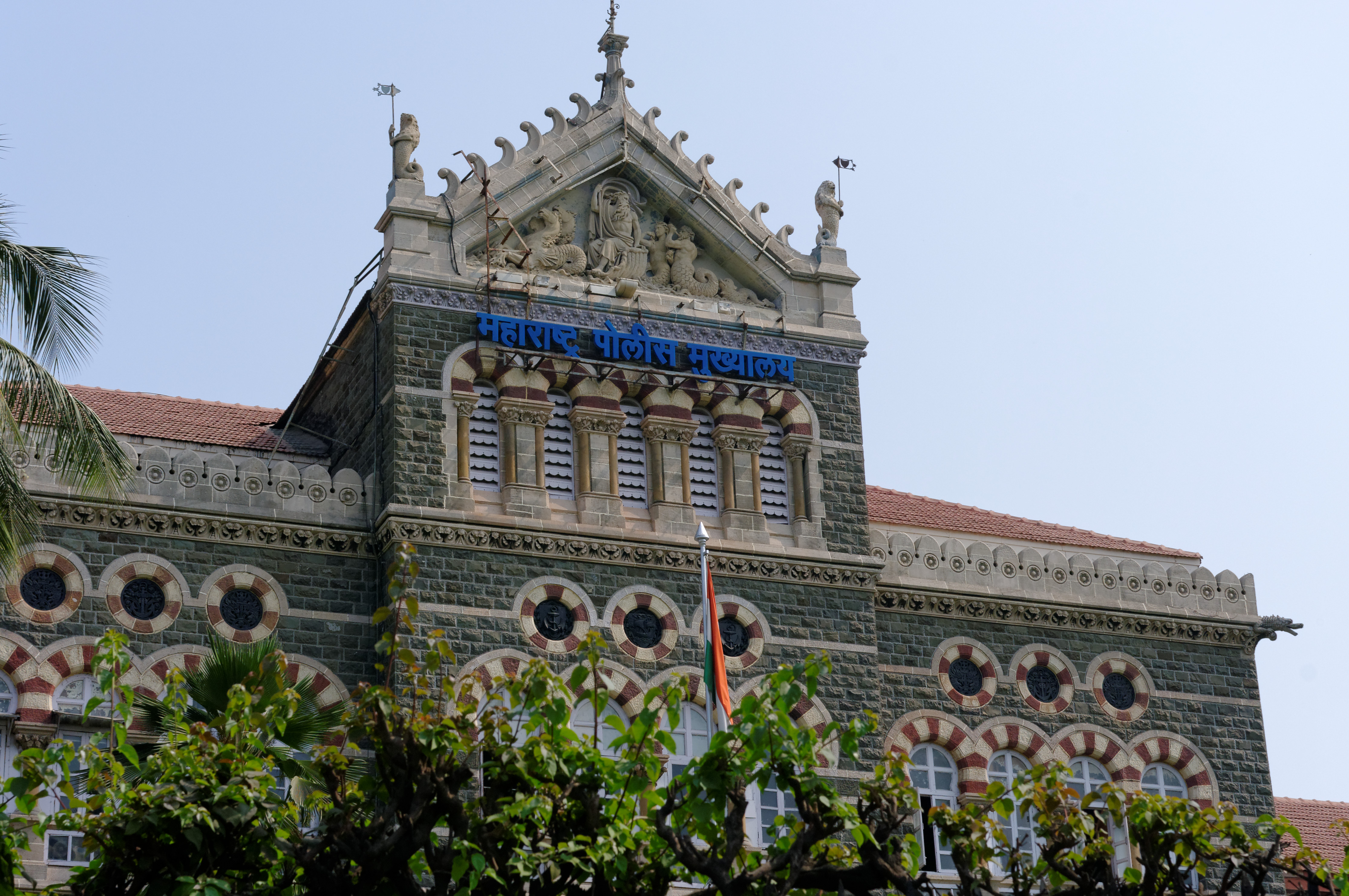
Maharashtra Police Headquarters in Mumbai, where the state DGP sits.

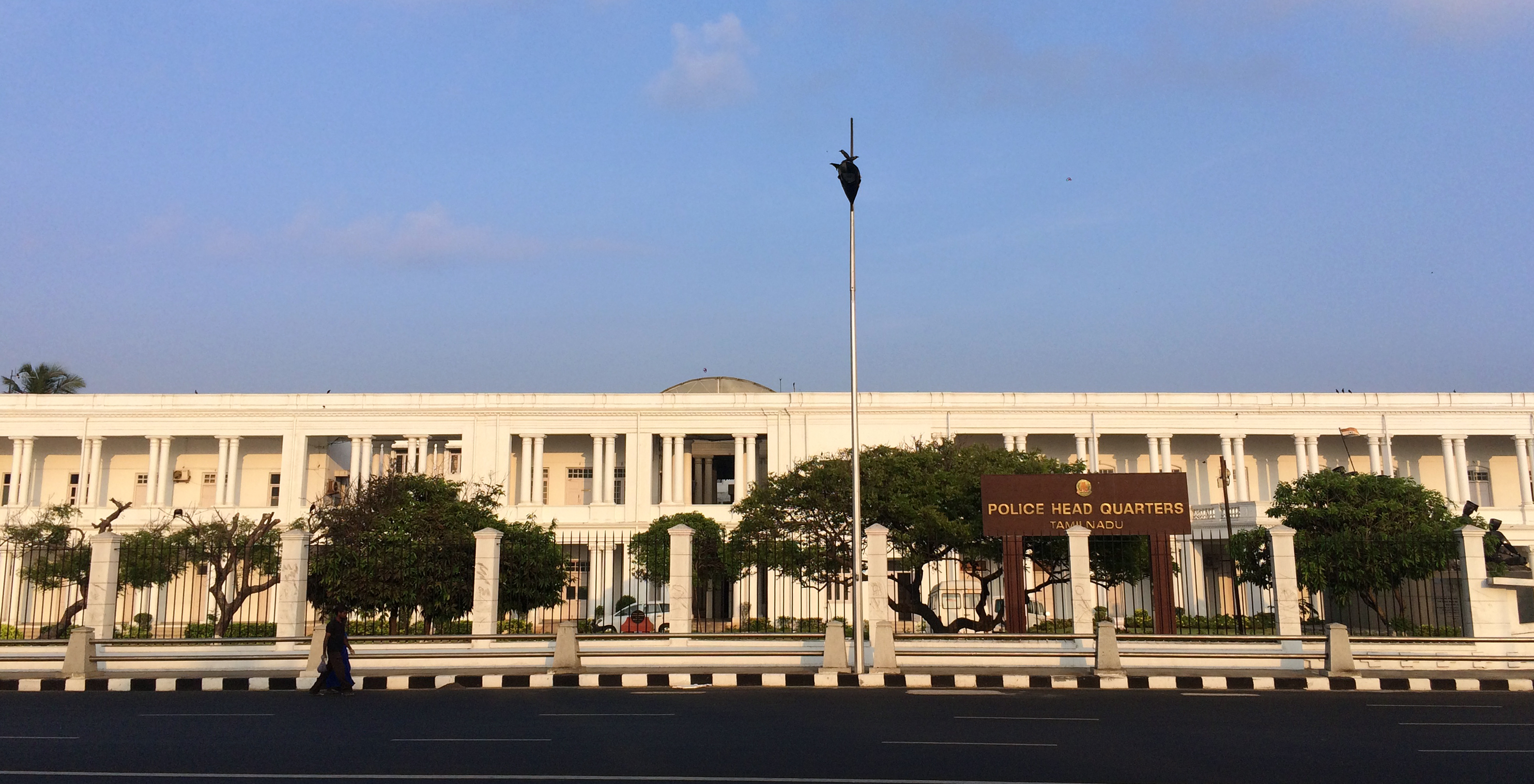
Tamil Nadu Police Headquarters in Chennai, where the state DGP sits.

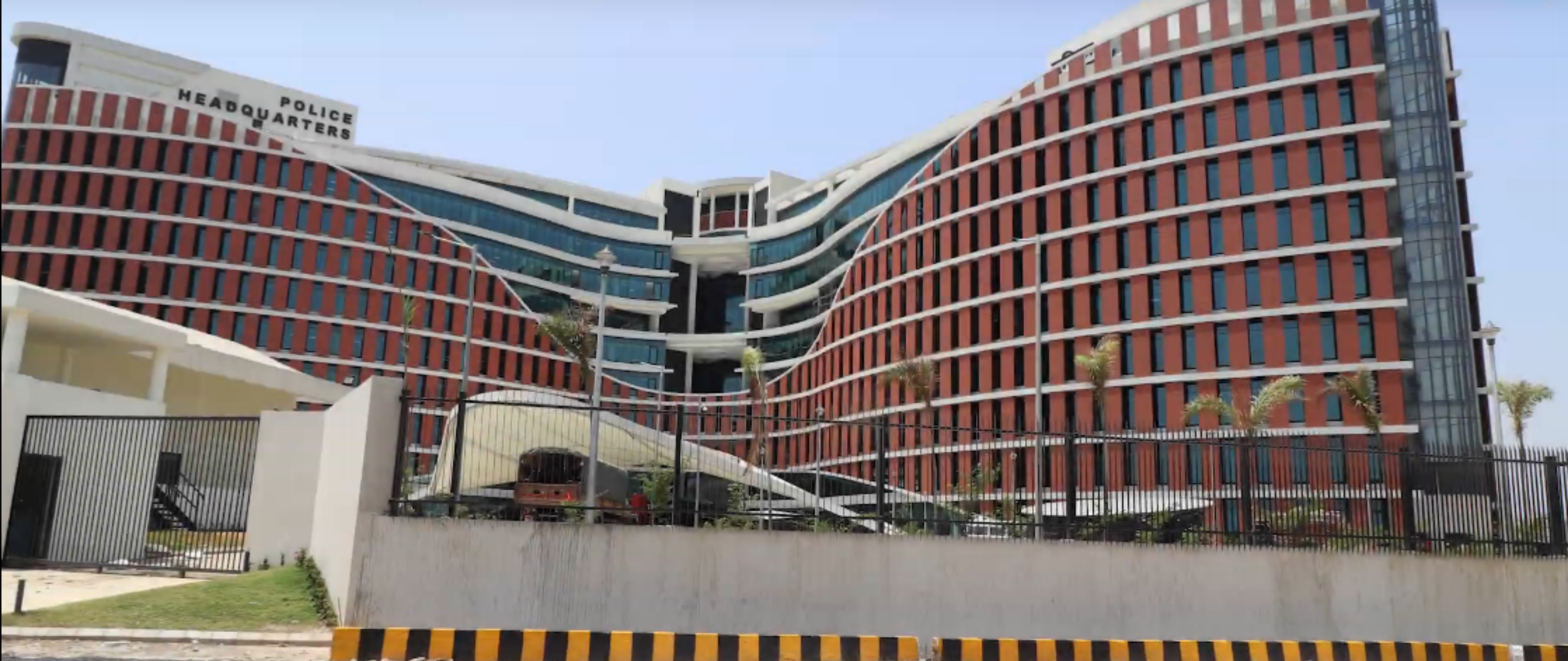
Uttar Pradesh Police Headquarters in Lucknow, where the state DGP sits.

State Police Chiefs
S.No.	State	Headquarters	Name of Police Chief	Batch
1	Andhra Pradesh	Amaravati	Harish Kumar Gupta, IPS	1992
2	Arunachal Pradesh	Itanagar	Rajesh Kumar, IPS	1995
3	Assam	Guwahati	Harmeet Singh, IPS	1992
4	Bihar	Patna	Preeta Verma, IPS	1991
5	Chhattisgarh	Raipur	Arun Dev, IPS	1992
6	Goa	Panaji	Alok Kumar, IPS	1996
7	Gujarat	Gandhinagar	Gyanender Singh Malik, IPS	1993
8	Haryana	Panchkula	Ajay Singhal, IPS	1992
9	Himachal Pradesh	Shimla	Ashok Ramchandra (acting), IPS	1993
10	Jharkhand	Ranchi	Tadasha Sen IPS	1994
11	Karnataka	Bengaluru	M. A. Saleem, IPS	1993
12	Kerala	Thiruvananthapuram	Ravada A. Chandrasekhar, IPS	1991
13	Madhya Pradesh	Bhopal	Kailash Makwana, IPS	1988
14	Maharashtra	Mumbai	Sadanand Date, IPS	1990
15	Manipur	Imphal	Mukesh Singh, IPS	1996
16	Meghalaya	Shillong	Idashisha Nongrang, IPS	1992
17	Mizoram	Aizawl	Sharad Agarwal, IPS	1997
18	Nagaland	Kohima	Rupin Sharma, IPS	1992
19	Odisha	Cuttack	Y. B. Khurania, IPS	1990
20	Punjab	Chandigarh	Gaurav Yadav, IPS	1992
21	Rajasthan	Jaipur	Rajeev Roy, IPS	1990
22	Sikkim	Gangtok	Akshay Sachdeva, IPS	1991
23	Tamil Nadu	Chennai	Mahesh Kumar Aggarwal, IPS	1994
24	Telangana	Hyderabad	C. V. Anand, IPS	1990
25	Tripura	Agartala	Samir Ghose, IPS	1992
26	Uttar Pradesh	Lucknow	Rajeev Krishna, IPS	1991
27	Uttarakhand	Dehradun	Deepam Seth, IPS	1995
28	West Bengal	Kolkata	Siddh Nath Gupta (acting), IPS	1992

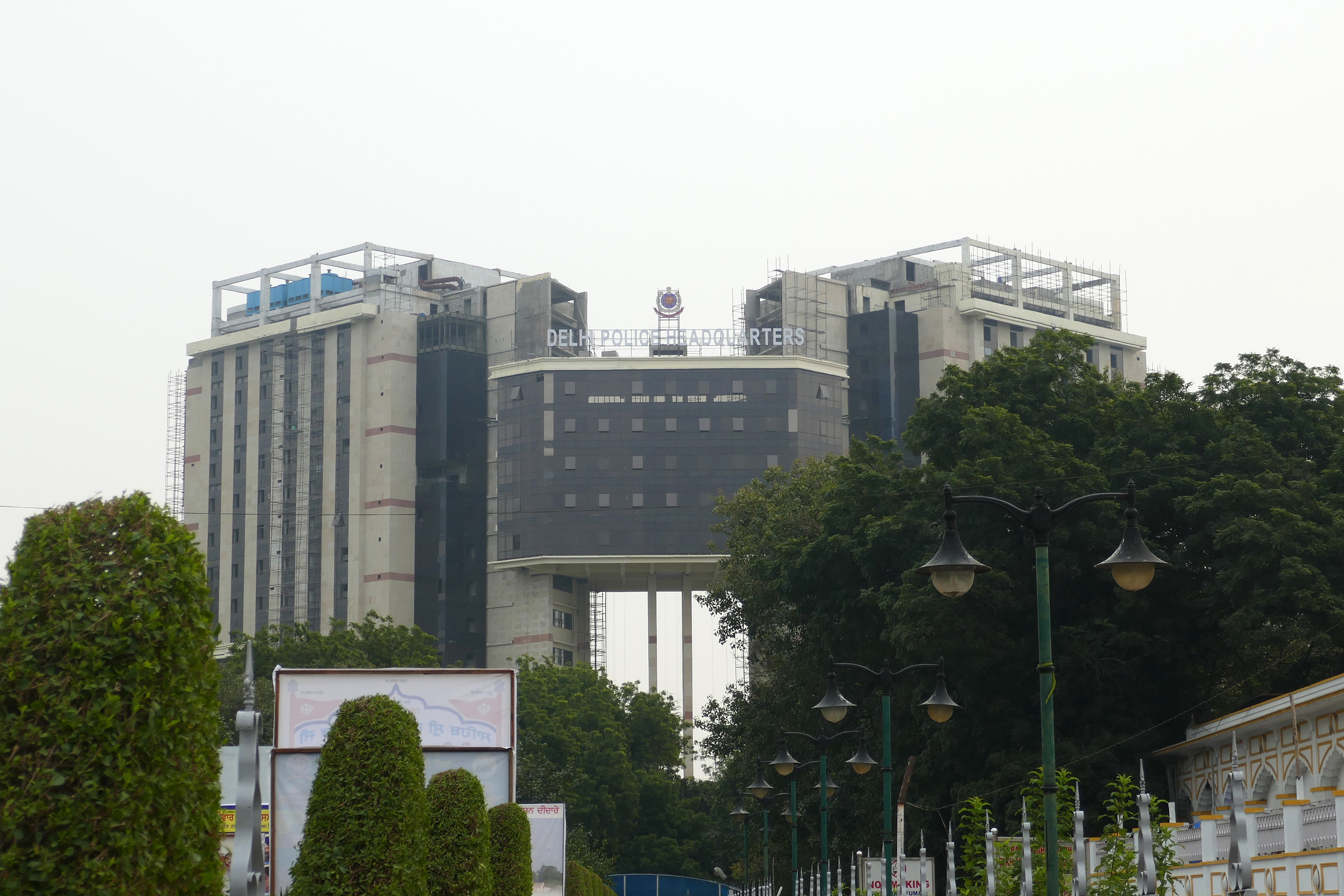
Headquarters of Delhi Police. It also serves as the office of Police Commissioner of Delhi, who is the ex-officio DGP of Delhi.

Police Chiefs of Union Territories
S.No	Union Territory	Headquarters	Name of the Police Chief	Batch	Rank
1	Andaman and Nicobar Islands	Port Blair	Ravindra Singh Yadav, IPS	1995	DG
2	Chandigarh	Chandigarh	Dr. Sagar Preet Hooda, IPS	1997	DG
3	Dadra and Nagar Haveli and Daman and Diu	Daman	Milind Mahadeo Dumbere, IPS	2006	DIG
4	Delhi	New Delhi	Anurag Kumar, IPS	1994	DG
5	Jammu and Kashmir	Srinagar (May–Oct); Jammu (Nov-Apr)	Nalin Prabhat, IPS	1992	DG
6	Ladakh	Leh	Anand Jain , IPS	1999	DGP
7	Lakshadweep	Kavaratti	Sameer Sharma, IPS	2011	SP
8	Puducherry	Pondicherry	Shalini Singh, IPS	1996	DG

== See also ==
- Advocate General
- Additional Director General of Police
- Chief Secretary
- Commissioner of Police
- Head of Forest Forces
- Police forces of India
- Law enforcement in India
