= Bhim Sain Bassi =

Indian police officer

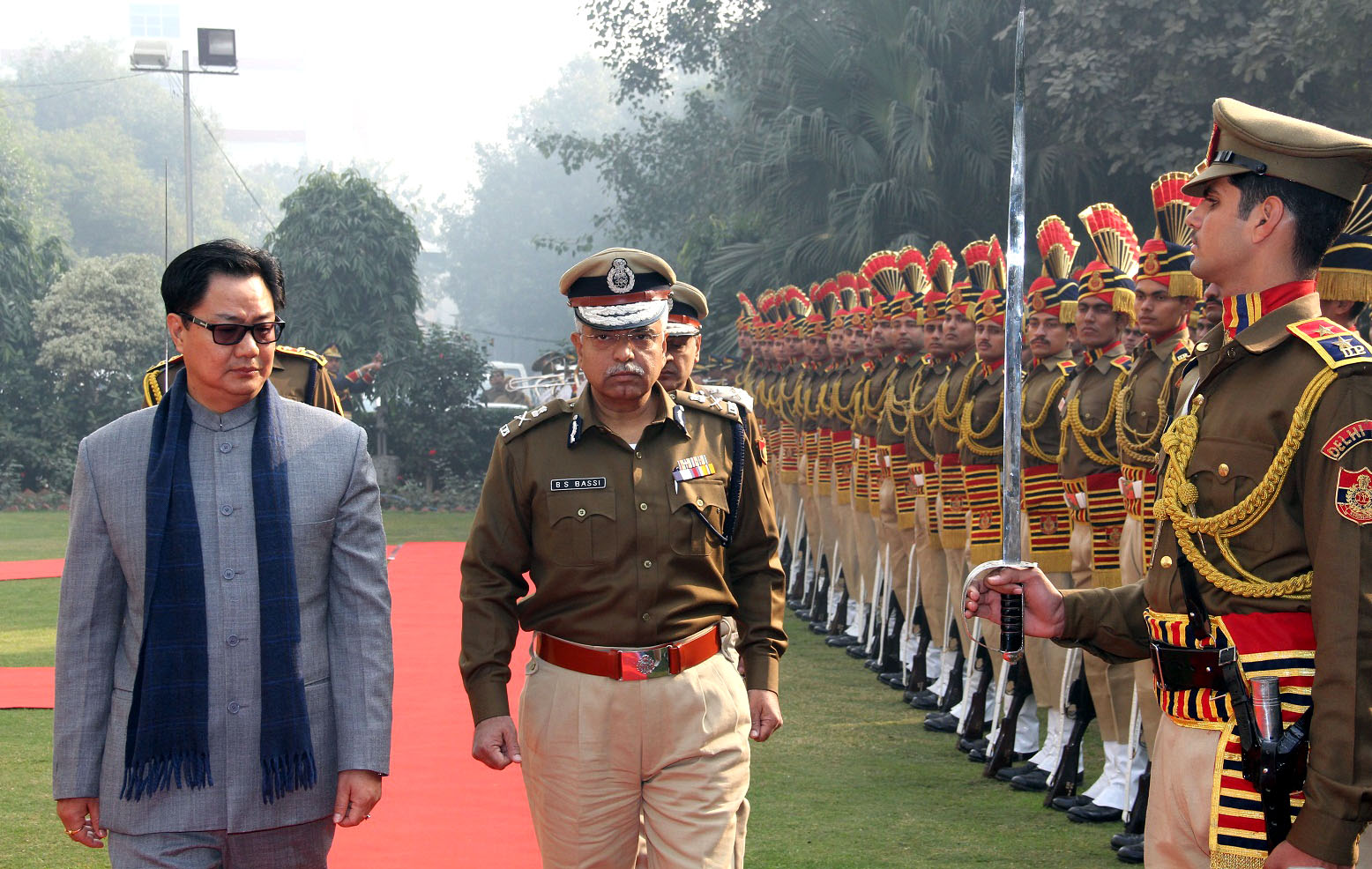
- Minister of State for Home Affairs Kiren Rijiju inspecting the guard of honour, accompanied by CP Delhi, B.S. Bassi, in 2014

19th Commissioner of Police, Delhi
- In office 1 August 2013 – 29 February 2016
- Appointed by: Ministry of Home Affairs (India) (Home minister - Rajnath Singh)
- Preceded by: Neeraj Kumar
- Succeeded by: Alok Verma

Special Commissioner of Police (Administration) Delhi Police
- In office January 2012 – July 2013
- Preceded by: Ajay Chadha
- Succeeded by: Vimla Mehra

Special Commissioner of Police (Traffic) Delhi Police
- In office October 2011 – January 2012
- Succeeded by: Sudhir Yadav

Director General of Police Goa Police
- In office 2009–2011

Personal details
- Born: 20 February 1956 (age 70) Delhi, India
- Spouse: Sunira Bassi (m. 1980)
- Education: Shri Ram College of Commerce; University of Delhi,
- Website: Government website

Bhim Sain Bassi or more commonly B. S. Bassi (born 20 February 1956) is an Indian Police Service (IPS) officer and has served as a member of the Union Public Service Commission since 31 May 2016 to February 2021. He served as the Commissioner of Police, Delhi from August 2013 to February 2016. He previously served as the Special Commissioner of Police (Administration) of Delhi Police (2012–13), Special Commissioner of Police (Traffic) of Delhi Police (2011-2012), Director General of Police of Goa Police (2009-2011) and Inspector General of Police of Chandigarh Police (2000-2002).

Bassi, a 1977 batch Indian Police Service officer, started his police career as an assistant superintendent of police in Pondicherry. Since then he has served in various capacities in Delhi and other parts of the India, including Arunachal Pradesh, Chandigarh and Goa.

== Early life and education ==
Bassi was born on 20 February 1956. He completed his graduation in commerce from Shri Ram College of Commerce of University of Delhi. Which is followed by a degree in law studies.

== Police career ==
Under his commission, the case against Kanhaiya Kumar in 2016 over alleged “anti-national slogans” at Jawaharlal Nehru University created major public debate. Bassi defended the police actions.

- Pondicherry
- Delhi (first tenure)
- Arunachal Pradesh
- Chandigarh
- Delhi (second tenure)
- Goa
- Delhi (third tenure)

== Personal life ==
Bassi married to Sunira Bassi, who is retired bureaucrat and her last posting was with the Northern Railway as the Chief Traffic Planning Manager. The couple have a daughter and a son.
