= Asaram =

Indian spiritual leader and convicted rapist (born 1941)

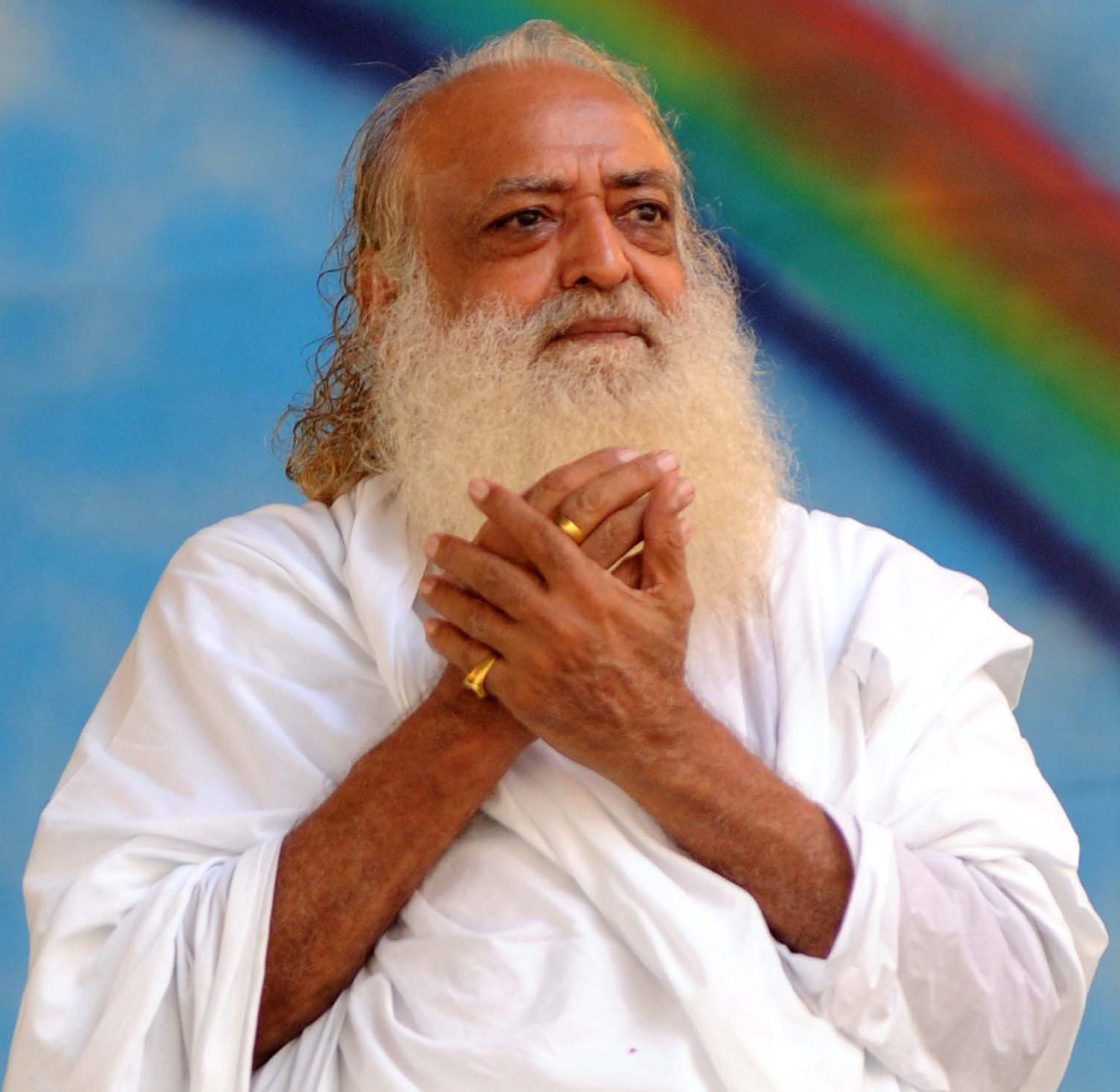
- Born: Asumal Sirumalani Harpalani; 17 April 1941 (age 85); Berani, Sind Province, British India
- Other name: Asaram
- Organization: Shree Yog Vedanta Sewa Samiti
- Notable work: Matri Pitri Pujan Diwas and Tulsi Pujan Diwas
- Children: 2, including Narayan Sai
- Status: Interim bail by Supreme Court until 31 March 2025 on medical grounds
- Convictions: Rape, 2018
- Criminal charges: Rape, Murder, Criminal Intimidation
- Penalty: Life imprisonment
- Capture status: Arrested on 31 August 2013, Indore, Madhya Pradesh

Details
- Date apprehended: 1 September 2013
- Imprisoned at: Jodhpur Central Jail, Jodhpur
- Website: https://www.ashram.org/

Asumal Sirumalani Harpalani (born 17 April 1941), known by devotees as Asaram, is an Indian spiritual leader and convicted rapist, who started to come into the limelight in the early 1970s. By 2013, he was estimated to have established over 400 ashrams and 40 schools in India and abroad.

Multiple legal proceedings have been initiated against him, in connection with illegal encroachment, rape, and tampering of a witness. In 2018, Asaram was found guilty of the rape of a minor girl by Special Judge Madhusudhan Sharma of a special Scheduled Caste/Scheduled Tribe court in Jodhpur and is currently serving life imprisonment in Jodhpur. Asaram's counsel has filed an appeal in the Rajasthan High Court challenging the judgment of the special court. The counsel argues that the trial court ignored significant facts and claims that the case is a clear and disturbing illustration of trial by media.

In January 2025, Asaram Bapu was granted interim bail by Supreme Court till 31st March 2025 on medical grounds. The bench noted that he was suffering from various age-related health conditions and had previously suffered a series of heart attacks. In October 2025, he was granted an interim bail of six months by Rajasthan High Court on medical grounds.

In 2024, Supreme Court lawyer and activist of the 'Fight for your Right' organisation, Kirti Ahuja alleged significant deficiencies in the legal proceedings in Asaram Bapu case. She said that the trial courts in Jodhpur and Ahmedabad failed to address several lacunae within the case, leading to a potential miscarriage of justice.

== Early life ==
Asaram was born on 17 April 1941, in the Berani village of the Nawabshah District in British India (present-day Berani Town is located in Jam Nawaz Ali Tehsil of Sanghar district Sindh, Pakistan), to Menhgiba and Thaumal Sirumalani, in the Sindhi community. His birthname was Asumal Thaumal Harpalani or Asumal Sirumalani.

Following the partition of India in 1947, he and his family moved to Ahmedabad, then part of the former Bombay State in India (now Gujarat), leaving behind their immovable assets in Sindh, where Asaram's father founded a coal and wood selling business. Asumal ran this business for a short time, after his father's death. He received his formal education at Jai Hind High School, up-till class III, when his father died.

=== Introduction into spirituality ===
Asumal fled to an ashram eight days before his eventual wedding but was persuaded by his family to return. He left home at age of 23 after marriage, but returned after meeting his spiritual guru Leelashahji Maharaj in Nainital. He was ordained as Asaram in 1964 by his guru whose spiritual lineage is said to include Vedavyasji, Adi Shankaracharyaji, Dadu Dayalji.

Sources mention him to have been involved in a variety of professions ranging from selling liquors and tea to repairing cycles and trading sugar, prior to his establishment as a religious leader.

== Personal life ==
Asaram is married to Laxmi Devi. They have two children, son Narayan Sai and daughter Bhartishree or Bharti Devi. Asaram remained a householder and was never ordained a monk. Their son Narayan worked with Asaram. In 2019, a sessions court sentenced Narayan to life imprisonment in a rape case filed against him by a former woman devotee in 2013. Laxmi Devi and Bhartishree were also arrested in relation to Asaram's offences, being accused of aiding and abetting the crime. They were acquitted for lack of evidence.

== Activities ==
=== Rise to prominence ===
According to his official biography, Asaram returned to Ahmedabad on 8 July 1971 and on 29 January 1972, built a hut at Motera, then a village on the banks of the Sabarmati. Although his official biography does not mention it, Asaram had lived in Motera's Sadashiv Ashram for two years, before setting up his own hut adjacent to it.

He became a popular katha-vachak (narrator of religious stories), combining his discourses with humour, music and dancing. Initially outside of his own Sindhi community, he attracted Other Backward Classes and Dalits. After he became well known, he started attracting the upper-caste listeners also. His ashrams offered free food. In the tribal areas, feasts were organized where utensils and clothes were distributed.

It was my great opportunity to have met him at a point in my life when nobody knew me ... From that time I have been receiving Bapu's blessings, have continued to receive his affection... Asaram's words had a yogic strength, and with trust in that yogic strength, the dream of crores of us in Gujarat will come true... I pray on Bapu's blessed steps, I bow to him. Sacred Bapu's love, his blessings, his best wishes will give me new strength. With that belief, I got the chance to come here, I consider myself lucky for it. I prostrate myself before blessed Bapu...

— Narendra Modi — then general secretary of Gujarat BJP and later Prime Minister of India — speaking at a gathering of Asaram's devotees at Motera Ashram (2000).
Scholars note Asaram to have played an important role in Modi's rise to power.

He converted his hut into a small ashram in 1973, and started with 5–10 followers. With successive local governments from across the political divide, paying economic patronage to him including by grant of lands for expansion of his ashrams, and a growing Hinduisation of the Gujarati society in the wake of Hindutva centered politics. (Note: However Justice D K Trivedi Commission stated that there is no evidence of such rituals in one of his Ashrams at Gujarat.) Many political leaders went on to visit him to pay him respect through the decades; primarily in lieu of commanding the votes of his followers, including Atal Bihari Vajpayee, L.K. Advani, Narendra Modi, Digvijaya Singh, Farook Abdullah, George Fernandes, Raman Singh, Uma Bharti, Kapil Sibal, Ajay Maken, Motilal Vora, Krishna Tirath, Vilasrao Deshmukh and Kamal Nath By 2013, Asaram claimed to have four hundred major and minor ashrams in India and 18 other countries, with over forty million followers.

=== Teachings and views ===
Asaram's core teachings align with Hindutva-centred views. Ram Puniyani notes overt Brahminical tones in his teachings.

Emphasizing upon the prominence of Brahmcharya and Guru-Shishya relationship, it was instilled among the devotees, to accept Asaram (and his son) as infallible, be blindly obedient to them and not to question them about anything, whatsoever. Physical violence is advocated for against any dissident.

Asaram has been long vocal against increasing sexual liberation of the society and deemed the adoption of Western culture artifacts as corruption of morality. Shri Yogi Vedanta Seva Samiti organized a Matri Pitri Poojan Divas ("mother-father worship day") on 14 February, as a form of protest against Valentine's Day, which is supposedly symbolic of a Western cultural invasion. Asaram's proposal was supported by many prominent Indian politicians including union ministers and the President of India. In 2015, the Government of Chhattisgarh state even institutionalized the practice, and directed all schools to observe Matru-Pitru Diwas ("mother-father day") every year on 14 February after Asaram urged the Chief Minister Raman Singh in this regard. Similar statement was also issued by Hindu Mahasabha. In 2014 he started Tulsi Poojan Diwas (a day to worship Tulsi - the Holy Hindu plant) to counter the celebration of Christmas.

The teachings are typically pre-recorded and broadcast through mass-media. Asaram has also organized spiritual discourses all over India, whence his disciples are accorded diksha (initiation by a guru) by him. Around 20,000 students visited his satsang in Ahmedabad in December 2001. He has also participated in shuddhi movements, and advocated against conversion to Christianity.

In 2024, thousands gathered at Asaram's Ahmedabad Ashram for Spiritual Awakening shivir organized during Diwali. The annual seven day event aimed to promote holistic development through Vedic knowledge, yogic practices and cultural revival.

=== Economic activities ===
Asaram runs an Ayurvedic medicine business. Two magazines—RishiPrasad, a monthly and Lok Kalyan Setu, a fortnightly—sold about 14 lakh copies every month in 2008, incurring a net annual earning of around INR 7.50 crore. Around three to four Gurupurnima functions, held per year, received donations ranging into crores of rupees. Frontline valued his assets (2008) at about INR 5000 Crore.

Gross economic mismanagement has been documented.

=== Tulsi Pujan Diwas ===
Asaram constituted Tulsi Pujan Diwas in 2014. It has been promoted as an alternative to Christmas.

== Controversies ==
=== Land encroachment ===
Asaram had a modus operandi of occupying vacant plots of land, through illegal means including forgery of records and unleashing a throng of devotees, when resisted by the state machinery. A number of his ashrams have faced legal challenges, on grounds of illegal encroachment. Multiple state governments have razed ashrams to reclaim lands, that were illegally encroached upon (including by forgery of documents) and there are multiple pending cases and investigations.

In February 2009, the Gujarat Legislative Assembly had revealed Asaram illegally encroaching upon net land of 67,099 sq. m, in Ahmedabad alone. In February 2013, Serious Fraud Investigation Office recommended his prosecution in land encroachment worth INR 700 crore.

=== Gurukul deaths ===
By 2008, 40 of Asaram's ashrams had gurukuls (residential schools) attached to them.

On 3 July 2008, two boys went missing from Asaram's gurukul in Motera (Gujarat). The boys' parents alleged that the ashram administration initially tried to restrain them from lodging a complaint with the police and that the police harassed them on receiving cues from ashram heavyweights. On 5 July 2008, the boys' mutilated bodies were found on the banks of the Sabarmati River near the Ashram, with the ashram having conducted several futile efforts in locating them. The incident led to unprecedented state-wide public agitations, with allegations that the boys had been sacrificed by Asaram and his followers through black magic.

Around the same time, two more boys were found dead at a sister-gurukul in Chhindwara (accommodating about 370 students). There were widespread local protests with calls for closure and numerous parents chose to take away their wards as a result, especially after the ashram authorities tried to prevent any telephonic conversation between them. The post-mortem report of the first death did not show any abnormality other than that of accidental death by drowning, and the parents accepted the results whilst giving Asaram and the Ashram authorities a clean chit. Forensic investigation went on to reveal bite marks on the second body; however, the parents chose to not hold the Ashram authorities of any negligence, and instead wanted a probe into an alleged conspiracy to defame the ashram. A magistrate-level inquiry was subsequently ordered, which held a fourteen year old fellow student of murdering both the children. The ashram was soon shut for at least a week.

The Narendra Modi-led Gujarat state government set up the Justice D.K. Trivedi Commission to probe the deaths in the Motera ashram and allotted a time-frame of three months. The commission had been criticized by the High Court for its procedural biases towards Asaram; the final report was submitted in 2013, but were only disclosed in 2019 by the state legislature, essentially exonerating Asaram of all charges but holding the ashram authorities responsible for negligence. A concurrent CID probe, ordered on the behest of the High Court of Gujarat had already rejected the claims of practice of black magic, in 2010.

It was reported that after this event, Narendra Modi had warned the Vishwa Hindu Parishad not to support Asaram in any public forum. Asaram's supporters attempted to a patch-up with Modi, but were unsuccessful. VHP was critical of Narendra Modi for abandoning Asaram. Modi later in 2013 asked BJP not to defend Asaram. Modi also ordered an investigation into his ashram properties.

=== Delhi gang rape comments ===
In January 2013, while addressing a gathering of his followers, Asaram commented of the 2012 Delhi gang rape victim to be as guilty as her rapists: "The victim is as guilty as her rapists… She should have called the culprits brothers and begged before them to stop… This could have saved her dignity and life. Can one hand clap? I don't think so." He went on to opine against harsher punishments for the accused in the Delhi rape victim case (under retrospective provisions), as he felt that the law had the potential to be misused.

The comments were widely criticized. Asaram states that his statements were distorted and misrepresented.

=== Jodhpur rape convictions and imprisonment ===
In August 2013, a 16-year-old girl who was staying at Asaram's ashram in Manai village near Jodhpur, accused Asaram of sexually assaulting her on the night of 15 August at his Manai ashram in Jodhpur on the pretext of exorcising her from evil spirits. The girl's parents, who were disciples of Asaram, filed a complaint with the police in Delhi, and a case was registered after the medical examination of the girl confirmed sexual assault. The issue was discussed in Indian Parliament and a strict action was demanded.

When Asaram did not appear for interrogation by 31 August, Delhi Police booked him under multiple non-bailable sections of IPC. Asaram was in one of his ashram(s) in Indore when clashes broke out between his disciples and the journalists and policemen. Eventually, the Jodhpur police arrested him on 1 September 2013 from his ashram, and flew him to Jodhpur, where he was imprisoned. Asaram was charged under Sections 342, 376, 506 and 509 of the IPC, as well as under Section 8 of the Protection of Children from Sexual Offences Act (POCSO) and sections 23 and 26 of the Juvenile Justice Act. Before his arrest he got wide-scale support from Bharatiya Janata Party in the state of Madhya Pradesh, including local MLA Ramesh Mendola. Ashok Singhal and Pravin Togadia, presidents of Vishva Hindu Parishad deemed the arrest to be an attack on Hindu religious sentiments; Akhil Bharatiya Vidyarthi Parishad, the student wing of the ruling party and the Hindu Jagruti Manch organised violent demonstrations across the country, in protest. News reports claimed Asaram had accused Sonia Gandhi and Rahul Gandhi to have conspired against him but was also quoted as saying "No, I don't accuse anyone. I am just saying what I heard". In 2015, Subramanian Swamy repeated same allegation citing Asaram has been framed in this case for his work against conversions.

Asaram had dismissed the girl's allegations and claimed impotency (which was subsequently proved to be untrue). Asaram had submitted to the court citation letters from former presidents KR Narayanan and APJ Abdul Kalam, former vice president Bhairon Singh Shekhawat, and Congress leaders Digvijaya Singh, Kamal Nath and Kapil Sibal to buttress his claim of having performed charitable acts over the years. However, the court, which sentenced him to life imprisonment for raping a minor girl, dismissed the citations. He has since been in jail and was denied bail 12 times. The family of the victim allege that they received threats from Asaram's followers wanting the charges against him dropped.

On 25 April 2018, Jodhpur Scheduled Caste and Scheduled Tribe Court found him guilty of the rape charges and pronounced a verdict of life imprisonment, along with a fine of ₹500,000 which was to be paid to the victim. Two of his associates were awarded 20 years imprisonment. He and the other co-accuseds went on to appeal for a suspension of the sentence in the Rajasthan High Court. On 29 September 2018, the Court suspended the sentence of one of the co-accused; however, on 23 September 2019, Asaram's plea for suspension was rejected. Appeal said the trial court ignored many facts in its decision, "The present case is a clear and disturbing illustration of trial by media." A separate appeal on the premises of the merits of the judgement, is ongoing.

Asaram continues to evoke blind devotion from his followers, who believe that he has been the victim of a conspiracy.

=== Surat rape case ===
In December 2013, Asaram's son Narayan was arrested on charges of rape, after two sisters from Surat alleged that he and his father had raped them in Asaram's ashram during the mid-2000s. The elder sister accused Asaram of repeated sexual assaults during 1997–2006 at the Motera ashram, whilst the younger sister accused Narayan of sexually assaulting her during 2002–2005 at the Surat ashram. One of the sisters also alleged that Asaram's wife and daughter helped the two men exploit the girls. In January 2023, a Gandhi Nagar court convicted him of this charge and sentence him to life imprisonment.

On April 26, 2019, Narayan was convicted under Indian Penal Code sections 376 (rape), 377 (unnatural offences), 323 (assault), 506-2 (criminal intimidation) and 120-B (conspiracy) by Surat Court and sentenced to life imprisonment.

=== Attacks against witnesses ===
From 2014 to 2015, there have been numerous attacks against various witnesses and relatives of victims, in the Asaram case.

A former devotee and Asaram's videographer was fired at by vehicle-borne assailants in March 2014. Less than a week later, another former devotee, who was earlier thrown out of the ashram on spurious charges, was subject to an acid-attack but he managed to overpower one of his attackers; subsequent grilling revealed that the group were instructed by a devout follower of Asaram to assassinate witnesses in the case. An ashram secretary was shot at, after his deposition before Trivedi Commission. A former aide of Asaram, who had turned against him, was shot and killed on 23 May 2014, after multiple prior attempts. Narendra Yadav, a vernacular journalist who profiled multiple stories on Asaram's exploits, was attacked in September 2014; he survived. A former cook, who was the prime witness in the Surat rape case, was shot and killed on 11 January 2015. Another of Asaram's former personal assistants, who turned witness in the Jodhpur as well as Surat cases, was victim of a stabbing by one of Asaram's follower after a court-session in February 2015; he alleged the act to have been green-lit by Asaram himself. Months later, the man went missing and police have failed to find any trace, till date; he had filed a plea in the Supreme Court for police protection, after being subject to a bevy of death threats by Asaram's followers, having mentioned about bringing more victims into the limelight. Another ex-personal-assistant and witness in both the cases narrowly missed an attempted murder in May 2015 and now lives under state protection.
