= 10/11 =

10/11 may refer to:

- October 11 (month-day date notation)
- November 10 (day-month date notation)
  - 2025 Delhi car explosion, also known as 10/11, a vehicle explosion near the Red Fort in Delhi, India
- 10 shillings and 11 pence in UK predecimal currency
- KOLN and KGIN television in Lincoln, Nebraska

== See also ==
- 11/10 (disambiguation)
