= 11/10 =

11/10 may refer to:

- November 10 (month-day date notation)
  - 2025 Delhi car explosion, also known as 10/11, a vehicle explosion near the Red Fort in Delhi, India
- October 11 (day-month date notation)
- 11 shillings and 10 pence in UK predecimal currency

== See also ==
- 10/11 (disambiguation)
