= Al-Falah University =

Private university in Haryana, India

Coordinates: 28.334628°N 77.210722°E

- University Logo
- Other name: AFU
- Type: Private
- Established: 1997; 29 years ago (as College); 2014; 12 years ago (as University)
- Affiliations: UGC
- Chancellor: Jawad Ahmad Siddiqui
- Vice-Chancellor: Ajay Ranga
- Location: Faridabad, Haryana, India
- Campus: Urban
- Website: alfalahuniversity.edu.in

Al-Falah University (AFU) is a private university located in Faridabad district of Haryana state of India.

== History ==
The university was established in 2014 by the Al-Falah Charitable Trust, during the Congress rule under Chief Minister Bhupinder Singh Hooda, through The Haryana Private Universities (Amendment) Act, 2014. The founder and managing trustee of Al-Falah University, Javed Ahmed Siddiqui, is a convicted criminal who was convicted for fraud worth ₹7.5 crore (US$778,819) and sentenced to three years in prison. The chancellor allegedly used forged documents — including GPAs of people who had died long before — to illegally acquire land in Delhi. Two top Al-Falah officials were found to have prior links with banned organisations SIMI and Jamaat-e-Islami, according to ED sources. The founder was arrested under PMLA for money laundering, forged documents, and fraud linked to the Red Fort blast probe. Police filed FIRs for multiple IPC sections covering cheating, forgery, criminal conspiracy, and document falsification.

== Accreditation ==
AFU is recognised by the University Grants Commission (UGC), NAAC, Association of Indian Universities (AIU), National Medical Commission (NMC), but since 2025 the university is under investigation or suspension by UGC, NAAC, AIU, NMC, various law enforcement agencies (including police of several states, ED and NIA) for financial irregularities, fraudulent accreditation, terror links, etc. Al-Falah University allegedly displayed outdated or false NAAC accreditation information on its official website, misleading students and regulators. The Enforcement Directorate reported that the university collected crores in student fees by misrepresenting its accreditation and recognition status. Investigators allege the university collected over ₹415 crore between 2018–2025 and diverted these funds via affiliated entities for non-educational purposes. The ED found that the university, engineering college, training institute, and trust operated under one PAN, making the financial structure opaque.

== Alleged Links to Terror Financing / Extremist Organisations ==
The Enforcement Directorate (ED) found “alleged links” of two senior officials of the Al-Falah group with the banned organisations Jamaat-e-Islami (JeI) and Students Islamic Movement of India (SIMI). As part of a sweep triggered by the 10 November 2025 car-blast near Red Fort, Delhi, ED conducted coordinated raids at 25+ locations linked to Al-Falah (campus, trustee offices, shell-company premises) to trace financial records, possible hawala transactions, foreign-fund flows and the “money-trail” of suspected proceeds of crime. The agency uncovered a network of nine shell companies, all registered at the same address, linked to the Al-Falah group. The shell-companies exhibited multiple red-flags: no physical presence at declared business premises, negligible utility usage, common phone number/email across firms, lack of statutory filings (EPFO/ESIC), overlapping directors or authorized signatories, weak KYC, minimal salary disbursal through banking channels, and absence of HR or payroll records. These firms are being examined for possible money-laundering and fund-diversion.

According to investigators, some individuals employed at Al-Falah University — including doctors — are among the suspects in the Red Fort blast, and are being probed for alleged participation in a “terror module.” The ED has arrested Jawad Ahmed Siddiqui — founder-chancellor of Al-Falah group — under the Prevention of Money Laundering Act (PMLA), citing allegations of financial irregularities, fund diversion, and possible links to suspected terror-financing.

== Schools ==
The university runs the following schools:

- Al-Falah School of Medical Sciences and Research Centre
- Al-Falah School of Education & Training
- Al-Falah School of Humanities & Languages
- Al-Falah School of Physical & Molecular Science
- Al-Falah School of Social Science

== Issues and controversies ==
=== 1990s-2000s financial scams: conviction of founder of AFU ===
==== Jawad Ahmad Siddiqui: Al-Falah founder's serial crimes ====
Jawad Ahmad Siddiqui, the founder and managing trustee of Al-Falah University, became subject to investigation. It included his business network and a previous criminal case in which he was charged with fraud worth ₹7.5 crore (US$778,819) and sentenced to three years in prison. After the forensic audit of Al-Falah University's finances by Enforcement Directorate and Delhi Police Economic Offences Wing, Javed Ahmed Siddiqui was not arrested by ED in November for 2025 terror financing, money laundering, hawala, and many other financial irregularities. He is also being investigated for old cases of fraud by him, including the 2000 investment scam for which he was arrested in 2001 and granted bail in 2004, and 1990s fraudulently private bank investment scheme.

==== Hamood Siddiqui: Al-Falah founder's co-conspirator brother's crimes ====
On 17 November 2025, Madhya Pradesh Police detained Javed Ahmed Siddiqui's brother, Hamood Ahmed Siddiqui, in relation to a financial crime in Mhow. After allegedly setting up a fake private bank and enticing hundreds of locals with promises of doubling their investments, he disappeared from Mhow in 2000. When the crime was exposed, he and his family had fled. To determine who helped Hamood, investigators are charting his interactions and travels over time. Javed Ahmed Siddiqui and his brother Hamood Ahmed Siddiqui, are son of qazi Hammad Siddiqui. On 20 November 2025, the Mhow Cantonment Board issued a notice to remove Jawad Ahmed Siddiqui's ancestral property, claiming that it was an unlawful development built on Ministry of Defence property.

=== 2008-2010: serial bombings ===
As per reports, investigators found a connection between the 2025 Delhi car explosion and Mirza Shadab Baig, a former student at Al-Falah University who had previously been linked to terrorist activities in India. He participated in the 2008 Delhi bombings, 2008 Ahmedabad bombings, Jaipur bombings, 2010 Pune bombing and is a member of the Indian Mujahideen. Investigators have access to his university identity card. He earned a B.Tech. in Electronics Instrumentation from Al-Falah University in 2007. Baig left India after the 2008 Delhi explosions and is currently under Interpol's Red Corner Notice. He was instrumental in the recruiting, indoctrination, and training of the Indian Mujahideen, assisting in the establishment and expansion of terror modules throughout Delhi, Azamgarh, and other areas.

=== 2025 terror-bombing investigation by law enforcement authorities ===
AFU is under investigation by several law enforcement agencies for the suspected terror-links. The Delhi Police Special Cell filed FIR under the Unlawful Activities (Prevention) Act to investigate the larger scheme behind the explosion, and it was forwarded to the National Investigation Agency. In October–November 2025, the university came under scrutiny after a joint operation by the Haryana Police and the Jammu and Kashmir Police uncovered a large cache of explosives and arms from rented accommodation in Dhauj village, Faridabad. The accommodation had reportedly been used by a faculty member of the university. According to police statements, a total of approximately three tonnes of explosive material of which 368 kg (811 lb) of ammonium nitrate were recovered in multiple raids, along with assault rifles, live ammunition, timers, walkie-talkies, and bomb-making equipment. Investigations suggest links to the proscribed militant organisations Jaish-e-Mohammed (JeM) and Ansar Ghazwat-ul-Hind (AGuH), and indicate a “white-collar terror ecosystem” involving radicalised professionals and students operating across states. The investigation revealed another batch of around 2,600 kg (5,700 lb) ammonium nitrate in a single-storey house owned by Maulana Mohammed Istaq, a preacher at the campus mosque since 2006, which is 4 km from the university at Fatehpur Taga. University officials have not issued detailed public statements regarding the investigation. The incident triggered heightened scrutiny of private academic institutions in the Delhi–NCR and spurred calls for stronger vetting of academic staff.

The government scrutinized Al-Falah's hiring practices, which are managed by Al-Falah's Okhla office rather than by campus academic committees. Investigators claim that this opaque structure made it possible to appoint a doctor who had been fired by the Government of Jammu and Kashmir due to security concerns to a prominent medical position. Al-Falah University hired Nisar-ul-Hassan, a medical professor who had previously been fired by Jammu and Kashmir Lieutenant Governor Manoj Sinha on 21 November 2023, in accordance with Article 311(2)(c) of the Constitution pertaining to state security. Nisar-ul-Hassan claimed to be the president of the Doctors Association Kashmir and was accused of using the group as a front to disseminate secessionist propaganda with the help of Pakistani agents. As authorities look into any connections between a network of doctors and the terror attack, his absence has come under scrutiny. On 13 November 2025, on the campus of Al-Falah University, the Haryana Police Bomb Disposal Squad found a silver Suzuki Brezza that belonged to Dr. Shaheen Shahid, a suspected terrorist who was allegedly tasked with establishing and overseeing JeM's women's wing in India under the banner of Jamat ul-Muminat. The vehicle was one of many that were meant to be used in the terror bombing. CCTV captured the white Hyundai i20 that detonated close to the Red Fort entered Al-Falah University on October 29 and departed the campus at 2:41 p.m. on October 30.

The Delhi Police Crime Branch's Inter-State Cell has been assigned the responsibility of looking into the purported fraud and irregularities at Al-Falah University. Investigations reveal that bomb suspects Umar Nabi and Muzammil Ganai, who worked for the Al Falah Medical Research Foundation, planned the terrorist attack on campus. Officers discovered that the accused communicated via the Signal app. Three months prior to the explosion, they formed a group on Signal to exchange information and provide guidance to one another. Dr. Muzammil Ahmad Ganaie, Dr. Adeel Ahmad Rather, Maulvi Irfan Wagay, and Dr. Muzaffar Ahmad Rather were added to the group by Dr. Umar Nabi. Four videos, including one that discussed suicide attack, were taken from Umar Nabi's smartphone after it was seized by investigators. The videos appears to have been taken on the university campus. The AFU faculty denounced the purported terror connections and offered to assist the investigative authorities in a press release on 17 November 2025.

Investigators claim that Dr. Muzammil Ahmad Ganaie bought ammonium nitrate from two authorized fertilizer stores in Sohna between December 2022 and February 2023 which aligned with previous disclosures made during interrogation, and records seizure from shopkeepers. On 27 November 2025, while mapping out Dr. Shaheen Shahid's activities across Al-Falah University campus, to rebuild her daily routine and identify suspected associates, NIA uncovered ₹18 lakh in cash stashed inside an wardrobe in dormitory room number 32. The detectives are tracing the source and trying to ascertain whether it had been channeled through terror network. Searches have also begun to locate anyone who may have assisted the cash transfer.

=== 2025 ED investigation for unauthorised foreign-funding and money-laundering ===
==== Hawala ====
Funds raised overseas for supposed-charity transferred to India via hawala: While Al-Falah Charitable Trust maintains that the university is fee-driven, denies accepting foreign funds, however, Enforcement Directorate (ED), a law enforcement and economic intelligence agency of the Government of India, investigation revealed that the university occasionally hosted fundraisers from Gulf nations as well as overseas benefactors, does not possess FCRA license, and engages in money laundering and terrorism financing through hawala. Consequently, its chairman Javed Ahmed Siddiqui was arrested in November 2025 under Prevention of Money Laundering Act, 2002 and sent to 13 days custody. When ED arrested Javed Ahmed Siddiqui in relation to money laundering case involving terror financing, over ₹48 lakhs in cash, numerous digital gadgets, and documentation proof were discovered and seized during raids. "Investigative agencies believe there were crores of rupees that were being generated by this group, the Al-Falah Group, and through Hawala Roots, this money was then being sent to fund the terror activities".

==== Shell companies ====
Money laundering via shell companies: On 18 November 2025, the ED conducted raids in Delhi and the National Capital Region at 25 premises associated with the Al-Falah Group. As part of the investigation, nine shell firms, all registered to a single address, are being investigated for financial irregularities. Numerous risk indicators were discovered, such as minimal salary disbursement through banking channels, a lack of HR records, synchronized incorporation patterns, common contact coordinates across firms, a lack of physical presence or significant utility consumption at declared places of business, a common mobile number and email across multiple companies and accounts, a lack of EPFO/ESIC filings inconsistent with reported scale of operations, overlapping directors and signatories, and weak KYC trails across entities. He fraudulently laundered and channeled crores of charitable trust's money to his and his family owned companies accounts through the network of several shell companies registered at the same address. The scam is worth over Rs415.10 crore rupees.

Series of frauds were committed and money was laundered through several shell companies, including the following, all linked to the same company tax registration permanent account number (PAN), and Javed is director of all these companies. Using fraudulent means, Javed increased AFU's income 300% over 7 years between fy2018-19 to fy2024-25.

1. Al-Falah Educational Pvt Ltd, not-for-profit company which runs Al-Falah University.
2. Tarbia Educational Pvt Ltd owns Tarbia Education Foundation.
3. Blue Star Education Pvt Ltd
4. Al-Falah Holdings Pvt Ltd
5. Al-Falah Infrastructure Pvt Ltd
6. Al-Falah Management Consultants
7. Al-Falah Estates and Developers
8. AFS International Pvt Ltd
9. JAS Infratech Pvt Ltd

==== Dead man land scam ====
The Enforcement Directorate (ED) investigation also revealed a "dead man land scam" involving Javed Ahmad Siddiqui, the founder of Al-Falah University. Javed, operating through the university's not-for-profit parent company, the "Tarbiya Education Foundation", illicitly acquired over 50 land parcels in Khasra No. 792, Madanpur Khadar in Delhi. This was achieved by creating forged general power of attorney (GPA) document in the name of a single intermediary agent, signed by landowners who had been deceased for decades earlier than the date on which the forged GPA were signed. This agent subsequently executed the sale of these properties to Javed's Tarbiya Education Foundation. GPAs used for the fabricated sales deed had forged signatures or thumb impressions of the deceased. Most of these dead people and their families who have been defrauded by Javed are Hindus, one of the plot of land fraudlantly usurped by AFU is Hindu cremation ground. Most of these Hindu victims of land scam by AFU and Javed are already fighting numerous court cases against the Javed's various entities including AFU. Most of the real land owner have died between 1972 and 1998, yet Javed gang created the fake GPA for all 50 properties on same day on 7 January 2004 to on-sell those, via Javed's land procurement agent who held fake GPA, to Al-Falah Network of fake companies owned by Javed. These land parcels belonged to dead Hindus, and forged GPAs were created fraudulently unbeknown to land's rightful inheritors, thus depriving the real owners of their land assets.

Nathu of Madanpur Khadar (died in 1972), Harbans Singh of Tehkhand (died in 1991), Harkesh of Okhla Phase-2 (died in 1993), and Shiv Dayal and Jay Ram of Tughlakabad (died in 1998) were among the deceased individuals in whose names the GPA was signed by forging signatures and fingerprints, according to ED's initial investigation. The 2004 GPA shows them as having signed it in favour of intermediary agent Vinod Kumar, who then sold these land to the Tarbiya Education Foundation in 2013.

=== 2025 suspension by Association of Indian Universities ===
The Association of Indian Universities (AIU) suspended Al-Falah University's membership on 12 November 2025, stating that the university did not seem to be in good standing as required by its bylaws. After the suspension, Al-Falah University was told to take the logo down from its official website right away and was prohibited from using the AIU name or logo in any of its operations.

=== 2025 investigation by National Medical Commission ===
The National Medical Commission (NMC) is keeping an eye on the probe and is awaiting the investigating agencies' report before taking any further action against Al-Falah University for harboring doctors involved in the 2025 Delhi car explosion. Its status as a medical college may be restricted or eliminated. The names of Muzaffar Ahmad, Adeel Ahmad Rather, Muzamil Shakeel, and Shaheen Saeed, who were charged under the Unlawful Activities (Prevention) Act, were removed from the National Medical Register by the NMC on 14 November 2025. The doctors will not be allowed to practice medicine or make any appointments as medical professionals until the panel delivers further orders.

=== 2025 investigation by NAAC and UGC for false accreditation ===
After the University Grants Commission and the NAAC discovered irregularities, the Delhi Police Crime Branch filed two FIR against Al-Falah University for cheating and forgery on 15 November 2025. Al-Falah University received a show-cause notice from the National Assessment and Accreditation Council (NAAC - an autonomous body of UGC) on 13 November 2025, for using a false NAAC certification on its website. According to the notice, the university has not applied for or been accredited by the NAAC, but it publicly states on its website that some of its colleges are NAAC-certified, which is incorrect and deceives the public, particularly parents, students, and stakeholders. The university has been asked to provide an explanation by the accreditation body, and it has been ordered to take down the parts of its website and other publicly accessible documents that make false claims about NAAC certification. Al-Falah School of Education and Training's accreditation ended in 2016, while Al-Falah School of Engineering and Technology's expired in 2018.

The university admitted that the out-of-date accreditation claims on its website were the consequence of oversight, mistakes in website design, and inadvertent lapses, according to NAAC officials. They stated the university apologized and notified NAAC that the misleading claims had been taken down.

=== 2025 NCMEI show-cause notice ===
National Commission for Minority Educational Institutions (NCMEI) has issued a notice to Al-Falah University to justify, in the light of its multiple faculty members having links with terrorism, why its minority institute status should not be revoked. The notice requests that Al-Falah submit records pertaining to its financing sources, appointment procedures, managing body, trust structure, and adherence to the National Commission for Minority Educational Institutions Act of 2004. The trust deed, management makeup, admissions information, faculty appointments, minutes from the governing body, and financial accounts for the previous three years have all been requested by NCMEI. Ex parte procedures may result from failure to appear or provide the necessary documentation. A verification report outlining inspections, supervisory measures, and correspondence with the university since its designation as a minority institution must be filed by the Department of Higher Education.

== See also ==
- List of institutions of higher education in Haryana
- List of medical colleges in Haryana
- Universities
  - Al Falah University, Dubai, UAE
  - Alfalah University, Jalalabad, Afghanistan
- Masjid Al-Falah, disambiguation
