= Rakesh Asthana =

Indian police officer

24th Commissioner of Police, Delhi
- In office 28 July 2021 – 31 July 2022
- Preceded by: S.N. Shrivastava
- Succeeded by: Sanjay Arora (officer)

Director General Border Security Force
- In office 18 August 2020 – 28 July 2021
- Preceded by: Surjeet Singh Deswal
- Succeeded by: Surjeet Singh Deswal

Personal details
- Born: 22 July 1961 (age 65) Ranchi (Now in Jharkhand), Bihar
- Education: Jawaharlal Nehru University
- Police career
- Country: India
- Batch: 1984
- Cadre: Gujarat

Rakesh Asthana (born 22 July 1961) is an Indian police officer, known for investigating various cases, including embezzlement, bribery, and bombings. He joined the Indian Police Service (IPS) in 1984 and was part of the Gujarat cadre. He served as the Special Director at the Central Bureau of Investigation(CBI). In July 2021, he was appointed as the Police Commissioner of Delhi. Asthana retired from the Indian Police Service (IPS) on 31 July 2022 after receiving a one-year extension.

== Early life and education ==
Rakesh Asthana received his education at Netarhat Residential School, Netarhat and St. John's College, Agra.

== Career ==
Rakesh Asthana investigated the Fodder Scam, a corruption scandal that involved the embezzlement of roughly ₹9.4 billion in Bihar. He filed a charge sheet against Lalu Prasad Yadav in 1996, leading to Lalu's first arrest in 1997.

Asthana caught Director General of Mines Safety (DGMS) taking bribes in Dhanbad. By that time, this was the first case of its kind in the whole country, when the officers of the Director-General had come under arrest.

Rakesh investigated the 2008 Ahmedabad bombings.

Asthana was involved in catching Narayan Sai on the Haryana-Delhi border.

== As Police Commissioner of Delhi ==
On 27 July 2021, four days before his superannuation, he was appointed as the Commissioner of Police, Delhi, succeeding Balaji Shrivastava who was acting as the Commissioner since the retirement of S.N. Shrivastava.

== Controversy ==
The NGO, Common Cause, had approached Court challenging Asthana’s appointment as Special Director on the grounds that his name had figured in a 2011 diary seized from Sterling Biotech – a company being probed by the CBI for money laundering. Asthana was not named in the FIR but was presumably the subject of an ongoing investigation by his own agency.

Asthana was entangled in a bribery controversy along with Alok Verma, Special Director CBI in a corruption scandal; both accused each other of bribery and subsequently asked to go on leave by the Government, on the recommendation of the Central Vigilance Commission.

Verma and Asthana were sent on leave on the recommendation of the Central Vigilance Commission (CVC) by the Government of India. Verma appealed to the Supreme Court of India, while Asthana went to the Delhi High Court. The Supreme Court canceled the decision to send Verma on leave, and he was reinstated as the CBI director two months later with the instruction not to take any major decisions until the Selection Committee decides his fate over the corruption charges.

The investigation by the CBI has been completed, giving Rakesh Asthana a clean chit, which was accepted by the Special CBI Court.
