= Amulya Patnaik =

Indian Police officer (born 1960)

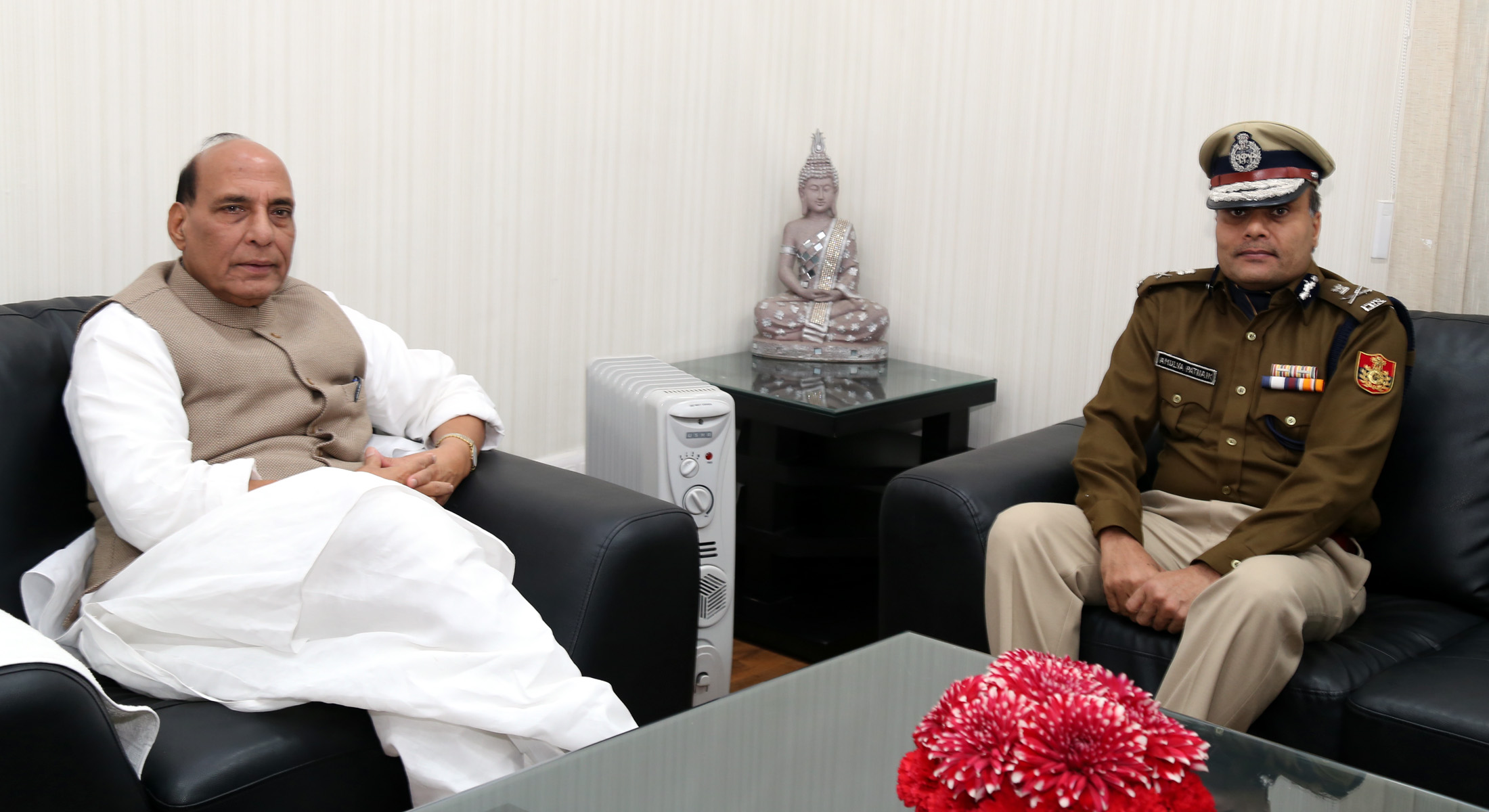
- The Commissioner of Police, Delhi, Amulya Kumar Patnaik calling on the Union Home Minister, Rajnath Singh

21st Commissioner of Police, Delhi
- In office 31 January 2017 - 29 February 2020
- Preceded by: Alok Verma
- Succeeded by: S.N. Shrivastava

Personal details
- Born: 15 January 1960 (age 66)

Amulya Kumar Patnaik (born 15 January 1960) is a former Indian Police Service officer who served as the 21st commissioner of Delhi Police from 30 January 2017 till 29 February 2020.

== Career and education ==
Patnaik born on 15 January 1960, who hails from Odisha. He has done his graduation in Political Science from Utkal University in 1979 and masters in same subject from University of Delhi in 1981. He is a 1985 batch IPS officer of AGMUT cadre.

His first posting as IPS was ACP Najafgarh (Delhi) and has also served as SSP of Pondicherry from 1989-93. In January 2017, He became the 21st Police Commissioner of Delhi and served till February 2020 and was succeeded by S. N. Shrivastava.

He has been severely criticized for his role in not controlling the riots in North East Delhi in February 2020. His tenure has been full of criticism as he was unable to control the Police-Lawyers clash in Delhi in 2019, JNU scuffle, Jamia scuffle and Gargi college molestation on 8 February 2020. He was set to retire in January 2020 but his term was extended due to 2020 Delhi legislative elections and Citizenship Amendment Act protests. Prior to this, he was serving as the Special Commissioner of Police (Vigilance and Administration) in Delhi Police.
