= Masjid Al-Falah =

Masjid Al-Falah or Al-Falah Mosque may relate to:

- Masjid al-Falah, Belize City, in Belize
- Masjid Al-Falah, Singapore, in Singapore
- Al-Falah Mosque, Selangor, in Malaysia
- Al-Falah Great Mosque, Jambi, in Indonesia

== See also ==
- Al Fallah, now-defunct newspaper
- Al-Fallah Club, sports club
- Universities
  - Al-Falah University, India, private university under investigation for Islamist terror attacks in India
  - Al Falah University, Dubai, UAE
  - Alfalah University, Jalalabad, Afghanistan
