= 2025 Delhi Red Fort blast =

Explosion in India

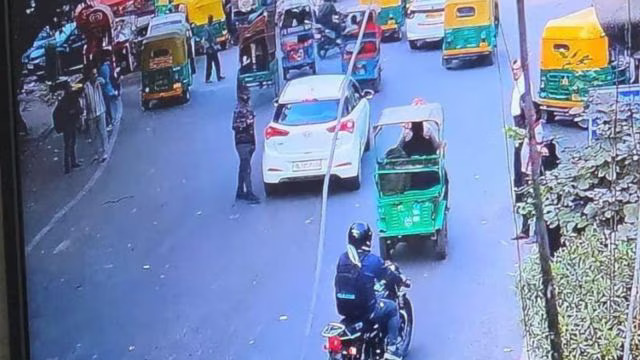
- A CCTV still of a white Hyundai i20 driving through a street in Delhi shortly before exploding.
- Location: 28°39′22.0″N 77°14′09.4″E; Near the Lal Qila metro station Gate No.1, Red Fort, Delhi, India
- Date: 10 November 2025; 06:52 p.m. IST (UTC+5:30)
- Attack type: Car bombing
- Weapons: Car loaded with ammonium nitrate fuel oil and other explosives
- Deaths: 15 (including the perpetrator[s])
- Injuries: 20+
- Motive: Under investigation

On 10 November 2025, a car exploded near the Red Fort in Delhi, India, killing at least 15 people and injuring more than 20 others. According to the Delhi Police, there were two to three people inside the car at the time of the explosion. The preliminary police findings indicated that the blast may have been a possible suicide attack, and the police have been investigating whether the incident was a deliberate terrorist act. On 12 November, the Indian government labeled the incident as a terrorist act.

Further police reports indicated that the blast is suspected to have been caused by ammonium nitrate fuel oil and other explosives in the car, which triggered a fire that damaged multiple nearby vehicles. Investigators later traced the car used in the explosion to Umar Mohammed, a Pulwama-based doctor, who worked at at Al-Falah University in Faridabad and had alleged links to individuals arrested during the earlier police raids conducted in the city which led to the capture of more than 2,900 kg (6,400 lb) of explosives. Subsequent DNA analysis of the human remains found in the vehicle identified Umar as one of occupants of the car. Based on evidence recovered during the investigation, he was allegedly part of a larger network consisting of several doctors from Faridabad and Kashmir, with links to foreign handlers.

The UN Security Council’s 38th report of the Analytical Support and Sanctions Monitoring Team has attributed the November 2025 blast to Al-Qaida in the Indian Subcontinent (AQIS). The report notes that AQIS has evolved from a fragmented group into a regional terrorist organisation.

== Background ==
On 9 November 2025, the Jammu and Kashmir Police, along with the Haryana Police, recovered around 350 kg (770 lb) of explosives, assault rifles, handguns, timing devices, and ammunition from a house in Faridabad, a city adjacent to Delhi.

The next day, the police raided another house in the same city and recovered approximately 2,563 kg (5,650 lb) of explosives, along with chemicals, reagents, flammable materials, and electronic circuits used to make bombs. As per the police, the houses were rented by Mujammil Shakeel, a doctor from Pulwama in Jammu and Kashmir. The police arrested Muzammil Ahmad Ganai from Pulwama and Adeel Majeed Rather from Qazigund, both doctors, who are alleged to be part of a clandestine cells linked to the Islamic militant groups, Jaish-e-Mohammed and Ansar Ghazwat-ul-Hind.

As per media reports, the doctor who rented the accommodations and the suspect who perpetrated the blasts worked at the same hospital in Faridabad. However, the police have not officially confirmed a link between the raids and the car explosion.

== Explosion ==
At 6:52 pm IST on 10 November 2025, a car exploded near the Red Fort in Delhi. The car, which was identified as a white Hyundai i20, was parked near the Red Fort for more than three hours prior to the incident. CCTV footage showed the car entering a parking area adjacent to the Sunehri Masjid at 3:19 pm and remaining there until 6:48 pm. As per Satish Golcha, the commissioner of the Delhi Police, after leaving the parking, the car stopped at a traffic light near Gate 1 of the Red Fort metro station before moving and exploding in slow-moving traffic. He also said that there were two to three occupants inside the car at the time of the explosion, with CCTV footage indicating a masked man driving the car before the explosion.

Police and eyewitnesses reported that the high-intensity impact from the blast destroyed the primary car and set fire to nearly a dozen vehicles nearby. The sound of the explosion was heard several hundred meters away, and shattered the windowpanes of the nearby buildings.

== Aftermath ==
The Delhi Fire Service reported that it received multiple calls between 6:50 and 7:05 pm and dispatched seven fire tenders to the spot. A fire service official later confirmed that the fire was brought under control by 7:29 pm. The fire service stated that six cars, two e-rickshaws, and one auto rickshaw were incinerated in the explosion and the subsequent fire. The blast killed 15 people and injured more than 20 others. The injured were admitted to Lok Nayak Hospital.

Following the incident, security was tightened across the National Capital Region with increased checks, patrols, and surveillance at crowded locations. Security levels were raised in other major cities across the country, and major religious places were placed under high security. On 12 November, the Cabinet Committee on Security was convened to review the incident and recommended further actions.

=== Misinformation and clarification ===
The Press Information Bureau (PIB) fact-checked and debunked a widely shared image that showed a large fireball and a mushroom cloud, clarifying that this image was not from the Delhi blast but actually came from an Israeli airstrike in Beirut on 27 September 2024. The PIB also rejected claims that the blast was caused by a CNG cylinder explosion, stating that no official from Delhi Police has made any such statement, and warned people not to share that fake narrative. Additionally, it refuted claims by certain social media posts that the blast was a false flag operation. After an undated video of the suspected bomber was released in the media, the government warned the media not to distribute such videos, and spread misinformation.

== Investigation and actions ==
After the explosion, the area around the Red Fort was cordoned off, and the National Security Guard and forensic experts collected evidence from the site. The National Investigation Agency (NIA) was tasked with the investigation of the case by the Ministry of Home Affairs. Preliminary police findings indicated that the blast may have been a possible suicide attack, and the police investigated the possibility of a deliberate terrorist act. The Indian government later termed the explosion as a terrorist attack. As per police reports, the blast was suspected to have been caused by ammonium nitrate fuel oil, which triggered a fire that damaged the nearby vehicles.

The Delhi police invoked the provisions of the Unlawful Activities (Prevention) Act, and detained two men for questioning. Investigators later traced the car used in the explosion to Umar Mohammed, a Pulwama-based doctor, who worked at at Al-Falah University and had alleged links to individuals arrested in Faridabad during the earlier police raids. Subsequent DNA analysis of the human remains found in the vehicle identified Umar as one of occupants of the car. According to the investigators, Umar allegedly acted under panic after the earlier Faridabad raids and might have either detonated the bomb prematurely or mishandled it.

On 14 November, the Indian Army demolished Umar's house in Quil village in Pulwama district. As per media reports, based on evidence recovered during the investigation, Umar was allegedly part of a larger terror network consisting of several doctors from Faridabad and Kashmir, with links to foreign handlers. As the initial case was transferred to the NIA, the Delhi Police filed a fresh first information report for further investigation of suspected activities in the region. The National Assessment and Accreditation Council issued a show-cause notice to Al-Falah University, which had employed the doctor involved in the incident, as the accreditation had lapsed earlier and was not renewed. On 26 November, the NIA arrested Soyab from Faridabad for sheltering and aiding Umar, marking the seventh arrest in the case.

On the first anniversary of the blast, officials said a year-long crackdown had led to more than 300 arrests and the deportation of 73 fugitives. The National Investigation Agency filed a chargesheet against 13 accused, including the absconding paediatrician Dr Muzzafar Rather. The blast also led to a new national counter-terrorism policy, PRAHAAR, unveiled on 23 February 2026.

On 16 November 2026, the Supreme Court allowed the NIA to transfer two cases linked to the alleged doctor module behind the blast, registered in Jammu and Kashmir and Haryana, to a special NIA court in Delhi, and allowed the clubbing of three FIRs so that all proceedings connected to the alleged network would be heard together.

== Reactions ==
=== Domestic ===
Droupadi Murmu, the President of India, who was on an official visit to Angola, spoke to home minister Amit Shah to inquire about the details of the incident. Narendra Modi, the Prime Minister of India, who was on an official visit to Bhutan, expressed his condolences, and said that strict action would be initiated against the conspirators of the incident. The Delhi government announced a compensation of ₹1 million (US$11,000) for the families of those killed in the blast and additional support for the injured.

Shah visited the blast site and the hospital where he met with the injured, before holding a review meeting with officials of the law enforcement agencies and the director of the Intelligence Bureau. He later stated that "all possibilities" are being examined and a "thorough investigation" will be conducted.

Rahul Gandhi, Leader of the Opposition in the Lok Sabha, called the explosion "extremely heartbreaking and concerning". Aam Aadmi Party chief Arvind Kejriwal commented that the incident was "extremely alarming".

=== International ===
Representatives of several countries and international organisations expressed their condolences and solidarity following the explosion. The ambassador of the European Union expressed grief on the incident and said that Europe stands by the people of India. The US ambassador said that the United States is closely monitoring the situation and advised its citizens in Delhi to avoid the affected area. As per the Russian news agency TASS, the Russian Embassy was reported to be checking whether any of its nationals were impacted. Afghanistan, Argentina, France, Iran, Japan, Maldives, and the United Kingdom offered messages of sympathy to the victims and support to India.

India has not officially named any external entity as responsible for the blast, and Pakistan made no official response to the event. However, Chaudhry Anwarul Haq, the former Prime Minister of Pakistan administered Kashmir, in a widely circulated video, suggested the possibility of militant/insurgent groups based in Pakistan being behind the explosion.

== See also ==
- 2025 Islamabad suicide bombing – Bombing in Islamabad, Pakistan
- 2025 Nowgam explosion – Accidental explosion at Nowgam, Jammu and Kashmir
- 2025 Pahalgam attack – Islamist terrorist attack in Indian-administered Kashmir
- List of terrorist incidents in India
