= Districts of Delhi Police =

List of Police Districts of Delhi

Coordinates: 28°36′36″N 77°13′48″E

There are 15 districts of Delhi Police, the agency responsible for maintaining law & order in the National Capital Territory of Delhi. A Police district in Delhi is headed by an IPS officer designated as Deputy Commissioner of Police (equivalent to Senior Superintendent of Police). As of January 2019, Delhi Police has 66 police subdivisions and 178 'territorial' police stations.

Apart from these, there are 8 Metro Rail, 5 Railways, 2 Airport and 5 Police stations for the specialized crime units namely Crime Branch, Economic Offenses Wing (EOW), Special Cell, Special Police Unit for Women and Children (SPUWAC) and Vigilance.

The new headquarters of Delhi Police is situated at Jai Singh Marg, Connaught Place, New Delhi. The Districts of Delhi Police are different from the 13 administrative revenue Districts of Delhi, which are headed by a Deputy Commissioner (DC), an IAS Officer.

== Organization ==
The NCT of Delhi is divided into two Police Zones, each headed by a Special Commissioner of Police (equivalent to Additional Director-General of Police) and six Police Ranges, each headed by a Joint Commissioner of Police (equivalent to Inspector-General of Police). The DCPs of all 15 Police Districts reports to these 6 Joint CPs, who further reports to the 2 Special CPs and then to Commissioner of Delhi Police.

There are six ranges of Delhi Police are Central, Eastern, New Delhi, Northern, South-Eastern and South-Western range. The two zones of Delhi Police are Zone I/North (consisting of Eastern Range, Northern Range and Central Range) and Zone II/South (consisting of New Delhi Range, Southern Range and Western Range).

At the police district level, a Deputy Commissioner of Police (DCP) is assisted by an Additional DCP and Assistant Commissioners of Police (ACPs). Below the ACPs are the Station House Officers (SHOs), typically officers of the Police Inspector (Insp.) rank, who are in charge of police stations in India.

== Police zones, ranges and districts ==
List of the police zones, ranges and districts
#	Zones (headed by Special CP)	#	Ranges (headed by Joint CP)	#	Districts (headed by DCP)
1.	Zone I (North Police Zone)	1.	Jamnapaar Police Range	1.	North East Police District
1.	Zone I (North Police Zone)	1.	Jamnapaar Police Range	2.	Shahdara Police District
1.	Zone I (North Police Zone)	1.	Jamnapaar Police Range	3.	East Delhi Police District
1.	Zone I (North Police Zone)	2.	Northern Police Range	1.	Rohini Police District
1.	Zone I (North Police Zone)	2.	Northern Police Range	2.	Outer North Police District
1.	Zone I (North Police Zone)	2.	Northern Police Range	3.	North West Police District
1.	Zone I (North Police Zone)	3.	Central Police Range	1.	North Delhi Police District
1.	Zone I (North Police Zone)	3.	Central Police Range	2.	Central Delhi Police District
2.	Zone II (South Police Zone)	1.	New Delhi Police Range	1.	New Delhi Police District
2.	Zone II (South Police Zone)	1.	New Delhi Police Range	2.	South West Police District
2.	Zone II (South Police Zone)	2.	Southern Police Range	1.	South Delhi Police District
2.	Zone II (South Police Zone)	2.	Southern Police Range	2.	South East Police District
2.	Zone II (South Police Zone)	3.	Western Police Range	1.	Dwarka Police District
2.	Zone II (South Police Zone)	3.	Western Police Range	2.	West Delhi Police District
2.	Zone II (South Police Zone)	3.	Western Police Range	3.	Outer Police District
2 Zones		6 Ranges		15 Districts	

== List of districts of Delhi Police ==
List of 15 Districts of Delhi Police with effect from January 2019. (P.S. stands for Police Station).

Sl No.	Police District	HQ (Office of the DCP)	Sub-divisions (each headed by an ACP)
1	New Delhi district	P.S. Parliament Street	Lutyens Delhi, Parliament Street, Connaught Place, Barakhamba Road & Chanakyapuri
2	Central district	P.S. Daryaganj	Daryaganj, Kamla Market, Paharganj, Karol Bagh & Patel Nagar
3	Dwarka district	Sector-19, Dwarka	Dabri, Dwarka, Chhawala, Matiala & Najafgarh
4	East district	IP Extension, Patparganj	Preet Vihar, Kalyanpuri, Mayur Vihar & Anand Vihar
5	North district	P. S. Civil Lines	Civil Lines, Sadar Bazar, Kotwali, Timarpur & Sarai Rohilla
6	North-East district	Dilshad Garden	Seelampur, Gokulpuri, Nand Nagri & Khajuri Khas
7	North-West district	P.S. Ashok Vihar	Ashok Vihar, Model Town, Shalimar Bagh, Jahangirpuri & Uttari Pitampura
8	Outer district	Pushpanjali Enclave, Pitampura	Paschim Vihar, Mangol Puri, Nangloi, Sultanpuri & Dakshin Pitampura
9	Outer-North district	P.S. Samaypur Badli	Narela, Samaypur Badli, Bawana & Swaroop Nagar
10	Rohini district	P.S. Begumpur	Rohini, Begumpur, Aman Vihar, Budh Vihar & Prashant Vihar
11	Shahdara district	Shalimar Park, Shahdara	Shahdara, Seemapuri, Vivek Vihar & Gandhi Nagar
12	South district	P.S. Hauz Khas	Defence Colony, Hauz Khas, Mehrauli, Ambedkar Nagar, CR Park & Sangam Vihar
13	South-East district	P.S. Sarita Vihar	New Friends Colony, Lajpat Nagar, Kalkaji, Sarita Vihar & Badarpur
14	South-West district	P.S. Vasant Vihar	Delhi Cantt., Vasant Vihar, Vasant Kunj & Safdarjung Enclave
15	West district	P.S. Rajouri Garden	Janakpuri, Mayapuri, Rajouri Garden & Punjabi Bagh

Note: A police district is headed by an IPS officer of the rank of Deputy Commissioner of Police (DCP), while a police sub-division is headed by a Sub-divisional police officer (SDPO) of the rank of Assistant Commissioner of Police (ACP).

== See also ==
- List of districts of Delhi
- Neighbourhoods of Delhi
