= Neeraj Kumar (police officer) =

Ex-Commissioner of Police, Delhi

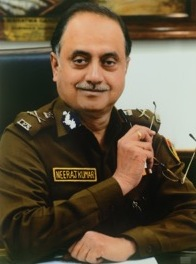
- Neeraj Kumar as Commissioner of Police, Delhi
- Born: 4 July 1953 (age 73); Patna, Bihar, India
- Police career
- Department: Delhi Police
- Service years: 1976 – July 2013
- Status: Advisor to BCCI's Anti-Corruption Unit
- Rank: 1979: Commissioned as ACP Chanakyapuri; 2012: Appointed as Commissioner of Police, Delhi
- Awards: President’s Police Medal for Meritorious Service in 1992, President’s Police Medal for Distinguished Service in 1999

Neeraj Kumar is a former Commissioner of Delhi Police who retired from the Indian Police Service (IPS) on 31 July 2013. Neeraj Kumar belonged to 1976 batch and AGMUT (Arunachal-Goa-Mizoram and Union Territories) cadre and has recently completed his tenure as the Chief Advisor to the BCCI for their Anti Corruption & Security Unit (ACSU).

During his distinguished career of 37 years, Kumar served in Delhi, Arunachal, Mizoram and Goa. He started his career as The Assistant Commissioner of Police (ACP) in the Chanankya Puri sub-division of New Delhi in 1979. On promotion, he served in Arunachal Pradesh as the Superintendent of Police (Bomdila). He was summoned to Delhi in 1982 to be a part of the police arrangements for the Asian Games, for which he received several commendations. Subsequently, during his tenure as Deputy Commissioner of Police (DCP) Traffic, he introduced several innovations including PrePaid taxi service at the Airport (operational till date), free eye camps for truck drivers, introduction of micro-processor based traffic signals etc. Subsequently, as DCP/South, he cracked the serial crimes being committed by an erstwhile criminal tribe wherein victims were being bludgeoned to death in their sleep and looted there after.

In 1992, as DCP/Crime he unearthed the massive multi crore racket in state run lotteries. In 1993, Kumar was promoted to the rank of Deputy Inspector General of Police after which he was on deputation with the Central Bureau of Investigation till 2002. He investigated several cases of terrorism, organized crime, economic crime and corruption. As the Director General (Prisons) he introduced several measures such as "Padho aur Padhao" (First learn yourself and then teach others) and "Sparsh" for the welfare of jail inmates. He retired from office in 2013 from the post of CP, Delhi.

== Early life and education ==
Kumar was born on 4 July 1953 to Shri Bishwanath Sahay and Smt. Pushpa Sahay in the city of Patna, Bihar. He completed his schooling from Sainik School Tilaiya. In 1973, he graduated from St. Stephens College, Delhi and further went on to pursue his post graduation from the same college of the

Delhi University. On completion, he joined the Indian Police Services (IPS)

== Indian Police Service Career ==
Kumar joined the Indian Police Service in 1976 as part of the AGMUT (Arunachal-Goa-Mizoram and other Union Territories) cadre.

=== First Posting in Delhi ===
After the completion of his probation, he was first posted as the Assistant Commissioner of Police at Chanakya Puri, New Delhi. He served there for a year from 1979 to 1980.

=== Arunachal Pradesh ===
He was then posted as the Superintendent of Police at Bomdila, Arunachal Pradesh for next two years (1980-1982).

=== Back to Delhi ===
He was summoned back to Delhi in 1982 for police arrangements to be made for the Asian Games, for which he received several commendations. He was later closely associated with the security arrangements during the Non Aligned Summit 1983, followed by The Commonwealth Heads of Govt. (CHOGM) Meet later that year. From 1982 to 1993 he served in the Delhi Police in various important assignments viz. Dy. Commissioner of Police/Traffic, Dy. Commissioner of Police/South and Dy. Commissioner of Police/Crime etc. His role in handling the 1984 riots as the Additional DCP of Central District was praised by various Commissions of Enquiry appointed by the Government to probe the role of the police during the riots. During his tenure in Traffic Police, he introduced several innovations including the Pre Paid Taxi service at the Airport (operational till date), free eye camp for truck drivers, introduction of micro-processor based traffic signals etc. As DCP/South, he is remembered as a people friendly DCP, who cracked the serial crimes being committed by members of an erstwhile criminal tribe in which citizens were being bludgeoned to death in their sleep, and, thereafter, looted. Ever since then the city has remained free of such crimes. His role in containing the rioters during the Mandal agitation in South Delhi was widely acknowledged and appreciated. As DCP/Crime he cracked the massive multi crore racket in state run lotteries in 1992.

== Central Bureau of Investigation (CBI) ==
- Special Task Force (STF)

On promotion to the rank of Deputy Inspector General of Police in 1993, he proceeded on deputation to the Central Bureau of Investigation where he served until 2002. In the CBI, he dealt with a wide variety of cases involving terrorism, organized crime, economic offences and corruption. He led the investigations in the serial blasts that rocked Mumbai (then Bombay), which were handed over to the CBI by the Mumbai Police in Dec. 1993. Under his leadership, the Special Task Force (or STF, created in the CBI to investigate the case) arrested seven members of the Memon family and sixteen other absconders. The charge sheets filed, at the time by the CBI led to the conviction of 100 out of the 123 accused in the case. Under his leadership, the STF also cracked the serial train blast cases of 1994. which occurred on the first anniversary of the Babri Masjid demolition in various prestigious trains, and unearthed a terrorist outfit called Ahle Hadees. The trial of the serial train blasts cas ended in life sentence to all the fifteen arrested accused.

== Important Cases solved ==
His tenure in the CBI is also highlighted by the solving of the Meenakshi Amman Temple blast case, the unearthing of the UTI Scam, the arrest and deportation of American Cultural Centre attack mastermind Aftab Ansari from Dubai, the arrest of Abdul Lateef, a notorious underworld don of Gujarat; Romesh Sharma, a Dawood Ibrahim henchman masquerading as a politician based in Delhi; the cracking of the cricket match fixing scandal in 2000. the arrest of Jagtar Singh Tara, the first accused to be nabbed in the assassination of the then Punjab CM Sardar Beant Singh, which led to the unraveling of the entire conspiracy. He has spoken extensively on his work with corruption in cricket as well as other prominent cases in his career as a featured guest on various podcasts such as Dostcast, Bridge India’s Voices, On The Record and The Cārvāka Podcast.

== Fight against Terrorism ==
On repatriation to the Delhi Police in February 2002 he was posted as Joint Commissioner of Police / Special Cell, responsible for tackling terrorism. During this tenure, he conducted several counter terror operations, many of which led to the neutralization of notorious Pakistani terrorists in Delhi. These included the encounters at Ansal Plaza, Tughlaqabad Fort, Deenpur Village in Najafgarh, Millennium Park and Lotus Temple. Thereafter, he was posted as Inspector General of Police / Mizoram. On promotion he was posted as Director General of Police, Goa, where he launched a sustained campaign against illegal immigrants, drug mafia and the Russian mafia indulging in land grabbing, human trafficking etc. He masterminded the arrest of Tariq Ahmed Batlo, a Pakistan trained Kashmiri terrorist, who was tasked with an assignment to cause Bali like bombings in Goa. Serious terror incidents were prevented in the holiday haven as a result of this arrest. On his return to Delhi Police on transfer, as Special Commissioner of Police, he was responsible for the entire planning and execution of the police and security arrangements for the Commonwealth Games 2010, which have been widely appreciated. As Director General (Prisons) where, besides toning up the jail administration, he introduced several innovative measures like a literacy programme called "Padho aur Padhao", in collaboration with the National Literacy Mission Authority, which brought down illiteracy amongst jail inmates substantially; campus placement for reformed prisoners in which nearly four hundred inmates given jobs. He also started a semi-open jail in Delhi. His initiative "Sparsh", was a scheme for the welfare of nearly 2,500 inmates who did not get any visitors from their homes or friends. On 30 June 2012 he was appointed as the Commissioner of Police, Delhi. During his tenure as the CP, Kumar and his police force exposed the scam of spot fixing in the sixth edition of the Indian Premier League (IPL 6) of cricket.

His first book ‘Dial D for Don’ published by Penguin Random House in 2015 is a runaway hit and figures on several bestseller lists. Kumar has recounted in the book the stories of eleven police operations that he conducted in the CBI. The book has received raving reviews from several quarters.

His second book 'Khakhi Files' published by Penguin Random House in 2019 has details of 9 other investigations conducted by him. Season one of 'Delhi Crime' a popular crime series on Netflix is based on chapter 'Night of shame' from the book. Season two of Delhi Crime is based on another chapter 'Moon Gazer' from the same book.

== Awards and Recognitions ==
Kumar has undertaken various foreign assignments and training session as part of the Delhi Police. He went to Tokyo (Japan) for three weeks in 1985 for a training programme on Traffic Police Management and attended a course on Post Blast Investigations organized by the Federal Bureau of Investigation FBI at Baton Rouge, Louisiana in 1997.

He represented India at the UN Convention on Trans-national Organized Crime in Vienna, Austria. He also represented India at Vienna during deliberations of United Nations Manual on Kidnapping & Extortion, 2014. He was handpicked to be the Conference Secretary when the World Interpol Conference took place in New Delhi in October 2007. He has visited U.S.A., U.K, Germany, Australia, Israel, France, Japan, U.A.E, and various other countries for conferences, investigations and training programmes. In February, 2012 he was invited by the U.K. Government to share his experiences of organizing the security arrangements during Commonwealth Games 2010 for the benefit of the U.K. Police.

He was decorated with the President's Police Medal in 1992 and President's Police Medal for Distinguished Service in 1999 and has also been felicitated by Luton Cricket Club, United Kingdom for "making cricket a better arena to play in" in 2013.
