= Alfalah University, Jalalabad =

Private University in Jalalabad, Afghanistan

Alfalah University
- الفلاح پوهنتون
- Type: Private
- Established: 2011
- Founders: Dr. Mashoq Sadat & Farhadudin Ghaws
- Accreditation: Afghanistan Ministry of Higher Education
- Chancellor: Dr. Mashoq Sadat
- President: Farhadudin Ghaws
- Vice-Chancellor: Nangyali Hashimi
- Academic staff: 143
- Administrative staff: 62
- Students: 5322
- Undergraduates: 2931
- Location: Street 1, Phase 2, District 4, Jalalabad, Nangarhar Province, Afghanistan; 34.4243°N 70.4607°E
- Language: Pashto, Dari, English
- Colors: Blue, White
- Website: www.alfalah.edu.af

Alfalah University is a private university established in 2011 in Jalalabad, Nangarhar Province, Afghanistan. It is the only accredited university in Nangarhar Province of eastern Afghanistan.

The institute quickly became one of the largest private higher education institutions in the east of Afghanistan. It was elevated to university status by the Ministry of Higher Education in 2020. The University is a hub for education, research, innovation, and public engagement; it offers both undergraduate and graduate degrees in multiple disciplines. These include courses in management, law, journalism, economics, and software Engineering at the undergraduate level, and business administration, law, and shariah at the graduate level.

== Faculties ==
- Faculty of Economics
- Faculty of Engineering
- Faculty of Journalism
- Faculty of Sharia'h
- Faculty of Law
- Faculty of Computer science

== See also ==
- Masjid Al-Falah, disambiguation
- Universities
  - Al-Falah University, India, private university under investigation for Islamist terror attacks in India
  - Al Falah University, Dubai, UAE
