= Al Falah University, Dubai =

University in Dubai, United Arab Emirates

Coordinates: 25.2362°N 55.3498°E

Al Falah University
- Type: Private university
- Established: 2015
- Location: Dubai, United Arab Emirates
- Colors: Red, green, and black
- Website: https://afu.ac.ae
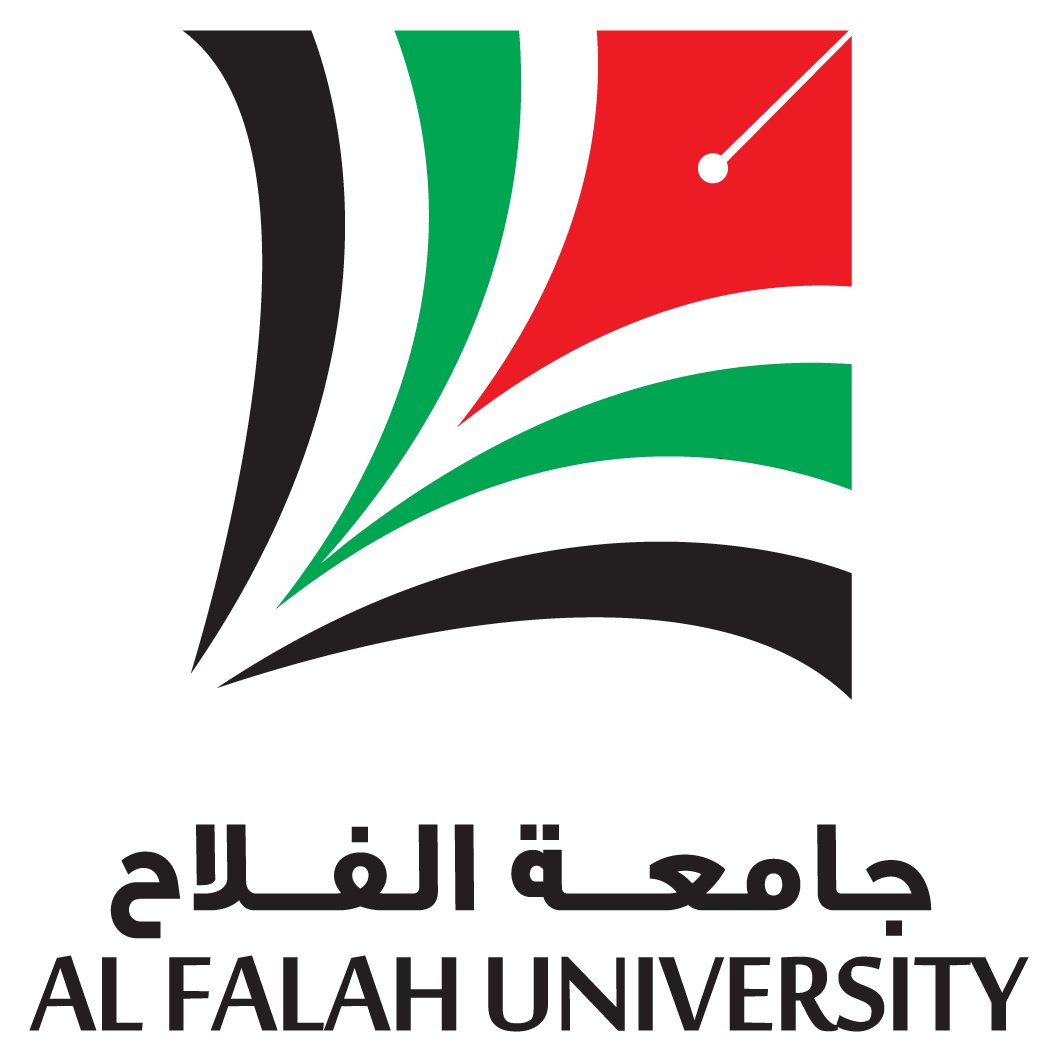

Al Falah University or AFU (Arabic: جامعة الفلاح) is a university in the Al Garhoud neighborhood of Dubai in the Emirate of Dubai. The institution was established in 2013 and opened its doors for its first batch of students in 2015. It is currently inactive; the university was put on probation by the Commission for Academic Accreditation (CAA) in the United Arab Emirates in October 2021, and its accreditation and license were revoked around October 2022.

The University had four colleges and academic programs: the College of Business Administration, the College of Law, the College of Mass Communication, and the College of Arts and Humanities. As of October 2022, the University's website has removed mention of its programs and admissions.

== See also ==
- Masjid Al-Falah, disambiguation
- Universities
  - Al-Falah University, India, private university under investigation for Islamist terror attacks in India
  - Alfalah University, Jalalabad, Afghanistan
