= Satish Golcha =

IPS officer (born 1967)

Director General of Home Guard
- Incumbent
- Assumed office 1 October 2026
- Preceded by: Virender Singh

Commissioner of Delhi Police
- In office 21 August 2025 – 17 July 2026
- Preceded by: Shashi Bhushan Kumar Singh
- Succeeded by: Anurag Kumar

Personal details
- Born: 30 April 1967 (age 59)
- Occupation: IPS
- Police career
- Department: Delhi Police
- Service years: 1992 - present
- Rank: Commissioner of Police

Satish Golcha (born 30 April 1967) is an IPS officer (1992 Batch) of the AGMUT cadre. He is currently serving as Director General of Home Guard from 1 October 2026 onwards. Previously, he served as the Commissioner of Delhi Police from 21 August 2025 till 17 July 2026.
