= 2025 Nowgam explosion =

Accidental explosion at Nowgam, Jammu and Kashmir

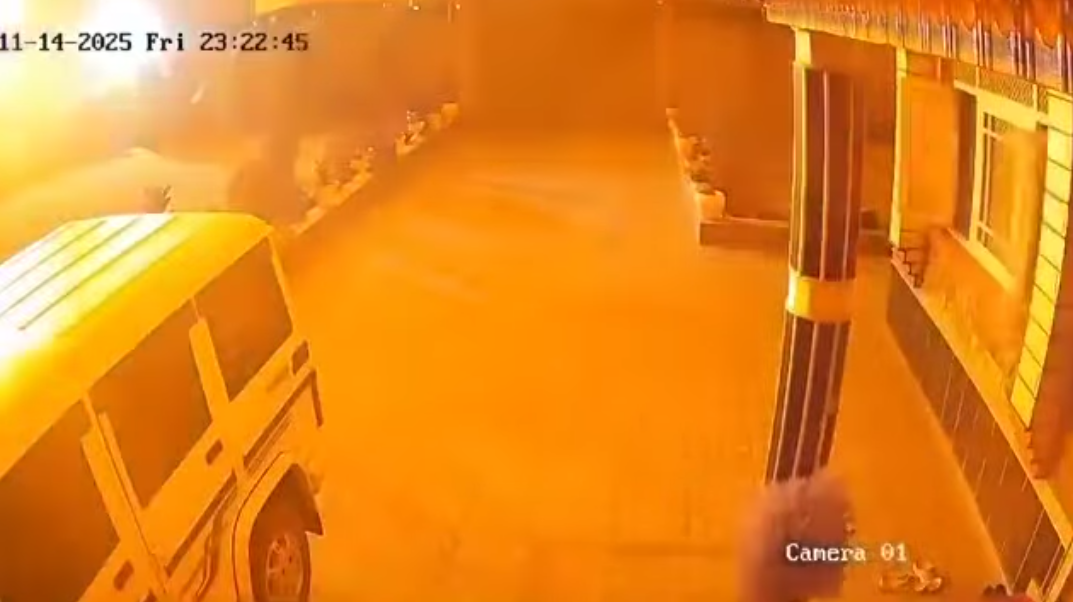
- CCTV image of the explosion
- Location: 34.026486°N 74.827450°E; Nowgam, Srinagar, Jammu and Kashmir, India
- Date: 14 November 2025; 23:20 IST
- Attack type: Accidental explosion
- Weapons: Ammonium nitrate fuel oil, potassium nitrate, sulphur
- Deaths: 9
- Injuries: 27–32

On 14 November 2025, an explosion occurred in Nowgam police station located on the outskirts of Srinagar, in the Indian administered union territory of Jammu and Kashmir. The blast occurred while forensic and police teams were examining the explosive materials seized earlier during an investigation into a suspected terrorist cell. The blast killed nine people and injured between 27 and 32 others. The Indian government ruled out any outside involvement and declared the incident as an accident.

== Background ==
In early November 2025, the Jammu and Kashmir Police, along with the Haryana Police, recovered more than 2,900 kg (6,400 lb) of explosives, assault rifles, handguns, timing devices, and ammunition from two houses in Faridabad, a city adjacent to Delhi. These included chemicals such as ammonium nitrate fuel oil, potassium nitrate, and sulphur, and were subsequently transferred to Nowgam police station for forensic analysis. A team of forensic specialists, police personnel, and revenue officials assembled at the station on 14 November 2025 to examine the seized chemicals.

== Explosion ==
At 11:20 pm IST, a powerful explosion ripped through the police station complex. Subseuqent CCTV footage showed a large fireball followed by a shock wave that destroyed vehicles parked nearby and damaged adjacent buildings. The blast triggered multiple smaller secondary explosions.

== Aftermath ==
The explosion caused severe structural damage to the police station building, apart from damage to vehicles and nearby structures. Nine people were killed in the explosion and between 27 and 32 others were injured. Those killed included three forensic experts, two revenue department officials, two police photographers, one investigative officer, and a civilian tailor. The injured included police personnel, government officials, and civilians residing nearby. Debris and human remains were found scattered for over 100 m (330 ft) from the site.

== Investigation and response ==
In the aftermath, security was tightened in the area and forensic teams were deployed to determine the cause of the detonation. Nalin Prabhat, the Director General of Police, said that the incident was likely an accidental explosion caused by the seized material. The Indian government later confirmed that no evidence of foul play or outside involvement was found in the initial investigation, and the explosion was an accident. The Jammu and Kashmir government announced a compensation of ₹1 million (US$10,000) for the families of the deceased and ₹0.1 million (US$1,000) for the injured.

== See also ==
- 2025 Delhi car explosion
