= Commissioner of the Delhi Police =

Head of the Delhi Police

Commissioner of Police Delhi
- दिल्ली पुलिस कमिश्नर
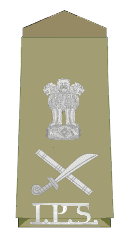
- Rank Insignia of the Police Commissioner (Director General Rank)
- Incumbent; Anurag Kumar, IPS since 17 July 2026
- Delhi Police
- Reports to: Union Home Minister; Union Home Secretary
- Residence: New Delhi Delhi
- Appointer: Ministry of Home Affairs, Government of India
- Term length: 60 years of age (whichever earlier); Renewable at Ministry's pleasure
- Constituting instrument: The Delhi Police Act, 1978
- Inaugural holder: J. N. Chaturvedi
- Formation: 1978
- Deputy: The Special Commissioner(s) of Police (one or more)
- Website: Office of the Commissioner

The Commissioner of Police, Delhi or Delhi Police Commissioner is the head of the Delhi Police, the law enforcement agency of the 15 police districts (as of January 2019) of India's capital, Delhi.

== Origins ==
In 1966, the Government of India constituted the Delhi Police Commission headed by Justice G.D. Khosla to investigate problems faced by Delhi Police. It was on the basis of the Khosla Commission Report that the Delhi Police was reorganised. Four Police districts were constituted: North, Central, South and New Delhi. The Delhi Police Commission also recommended the introduction of Police Commissioner system, which was eventually adopted on 1 July 1978.

Following the recommendations of "Khosla Commission", Commissioner of Police system in Delhi, the capital of India was started in 1978, with J.N. Chaturvedi being appointed as the first Police Commissioner of Delhi. It replaced the earlier Inspector General of Police system, where the Inspector General of police would report to the Divisional Commissioner (India) of Delhi, thus having a dual authority in effect. The Commissioner system brought an end to this dual authority as since then the appointed Commissioner of Police is of Director General of Police (DGP) reports to the Union Home Minister and the Lt Governor.

The longest serving Commissioner of Delhi Police is Krishan Kant Paul who served for 42 months (2004-2007).

== Incumbent Police Commissioners ==
The incumbent Commissioner of Delhi Police is Anurag Kumar, IPS who took office on 17 July 2026.

== List of Police Commissioners ==
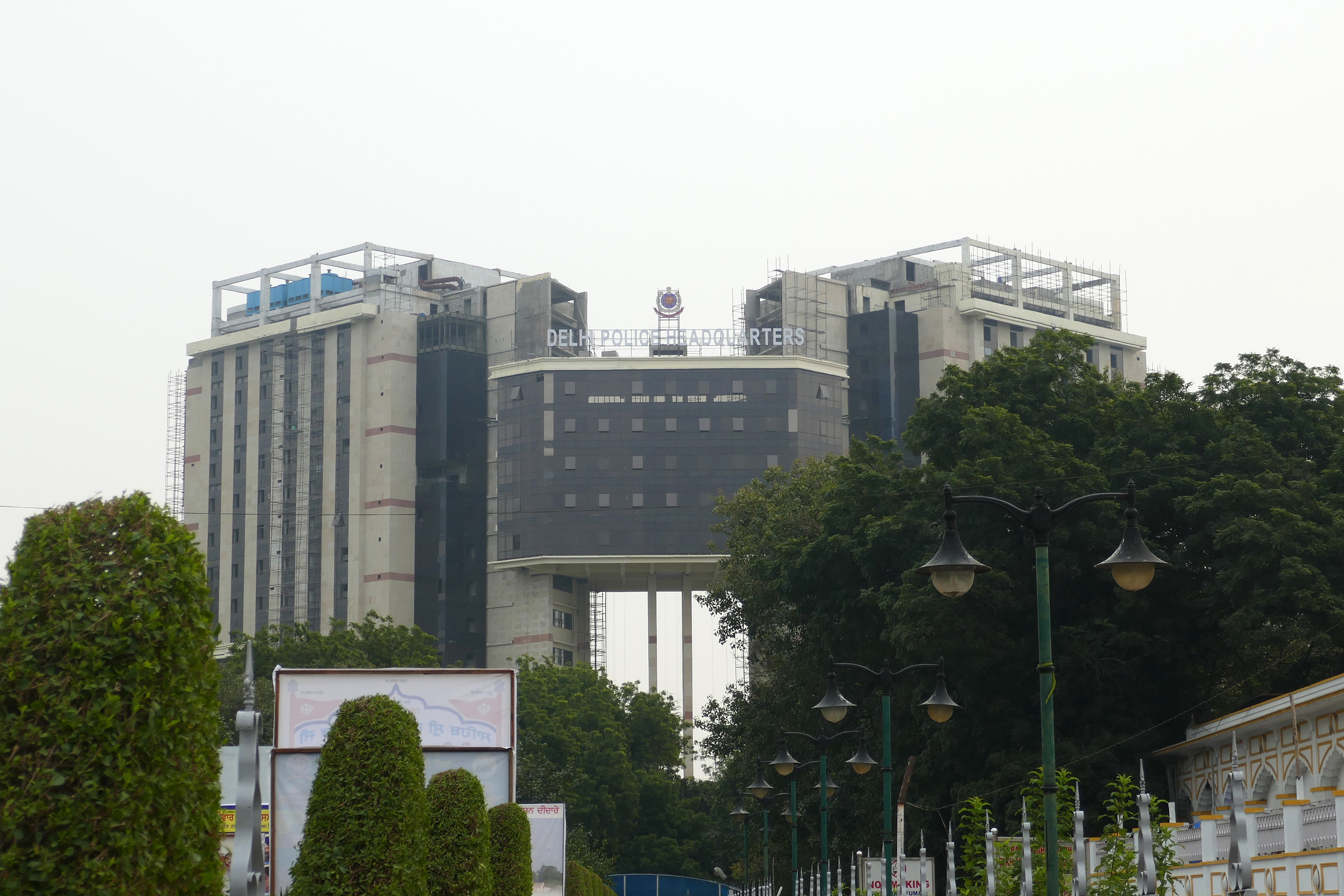
Delhi Police Headquarters

#	Name	Took office	Left office
1	J. N. Chaturvedi	Jul 1978	Jan 1980
2	P. S. Bhinder	Jan 1980	Dec 1981
3	Bajrang Lal	Dec 1981	Apr 1983
4	S. C. Tandon	Apr 1983	Nov 1984
5	S. S. Jog	Nov 1984	Apr 1985
6	Ved Marwah	Apr 1985	Apr 1988
7	Raja Vijay Karan	Apr 1988	Dec 1990
8	Arun Bhagat	Dec 1990	Feb 1992
9	M. B. Kaushal	Feb 1992	Jan 1995
10	Nikhil Kumar	Jan 1995	Apr 1997
11	T. R. Kakkar	Apr 1997	May 1998
12	V. N. Singh	May 1998	Jun 1999
13	Ajay Raj Sharma	Jul 1999	Jun 2002
14	R. S. Gupta	Jul 2002	Feb 2004
15	Krishan Kant Paul	Feb 2004	Jul 2007
16	Y. S. Dadwal	Jul 2007	Nov 2010
17	B. K. Gupta	Nov 2010	Jun 2012
18	Neeraj Kumar	Jun 2012	Jul 2013
19	Bhim Sain Bassi	Jul 2013	Feb 2016
20	Alok Kumar Verma	Feb 2016	Jan 2017
21	Amulya Patnaik	Feb 2017	Feb 2020
22	S. N. Srivastava	March 2020	June 2021
–	Balaji Srivastava (interim)	July 2021	July 2021
23	Rakesh Asthana	July 2021	July 2022
24	Sanjay Arora	Aug 2022	July 2025
–	Shashi Bhushan Kumar Singh (interim)	Aug 2025	Aug 2025
25	Satish Golcha	Aug 2025	Jul 2026
26	Anurag Kumar	Jul 2026	Incumbent

== Controversy ==
Opposition parties questioned the appointment of Rakesh Asthana, a 1984-Gujarat cadre IPS officer, as the Commissioner, who was appointed to the post on 27 July 2021, just before 4 days of his superannuation.

== See also ==
- Police Commissioner of Mumbai
- Police Commissioner of Kolkata
- Commissioner of the Hyderabad City Police
- Commissioner of Pune City Police
