= Masjid al-Falah, Belize City =

Mosques in Belize City, Belize

Masjid al-Falah
- Location of the mosque in Belize

Religion
- Affiliation: Islam
- Ecclesiastical or organizational status: Mosque
- Ownership: Islamic Mission of Belize
- Status: Active

Location
- Location: Central American Boulevard, Belize City
- Country: Belize
- Interactive map of Masjid al-Falah
- Coordinates: 17°29′21″N 88°12′02″W

Architecture
- Completed: 2008
- Site area: 0.828 ha (2.047 acres)

Masjid al-Falah is the largest and most prominent mosque in Belize, located on Central American Boulevard in Belize City. It serves as the religious headquarters of the Islamic Mission of Belize (IMB), which oversees its operations.

== Overview ==
The idea to construct a mosque emerged shortly after the Islamic Mission of Belize (IMB) was established in 1978. In 1986, the Belizean government granted 0.828 hectares (2.047 acres) to the IMB for the mosque's construction. Construction was funded through donations from local and international Muslim communities.

After years of planning and phased development, the mosque was officially inaugurated on 16 May 2008. It is also serves as a school for religious studies.

Masjid al-Falah is considered the central hub for Belize's Muslim community, estimated at 600 individuals, comprising Afro-Belizeans and immigrant Muslims.

== See also ==
- Islam in Belize
