= Parents' Worship Day =

Celebrated in parts of India on 14th February

Parents Worship Day
- Observed by: India
- Type: Cultural
- Celebrations: Worship of Parents
- Date: 14 February
- Frequency: Annual

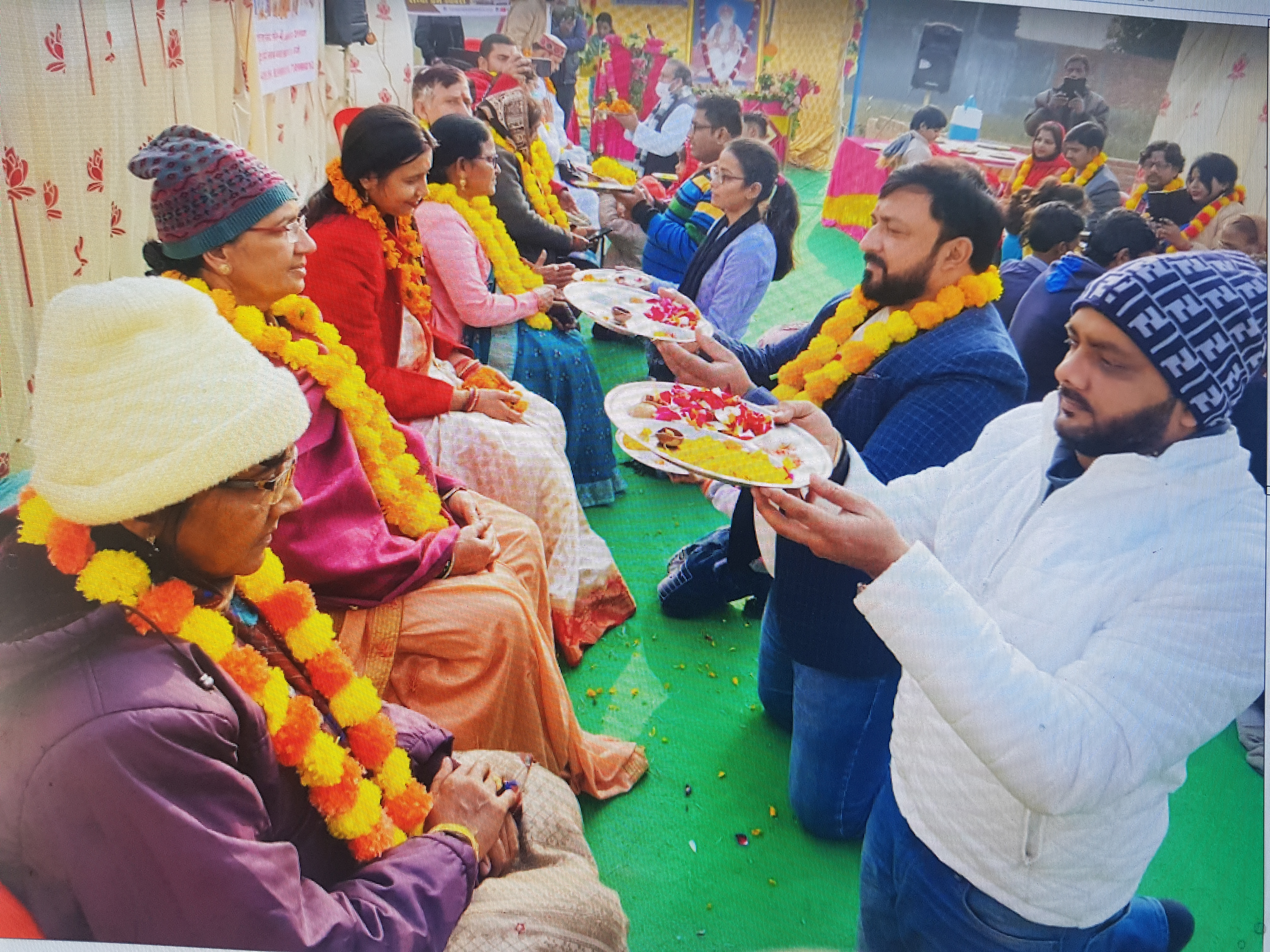

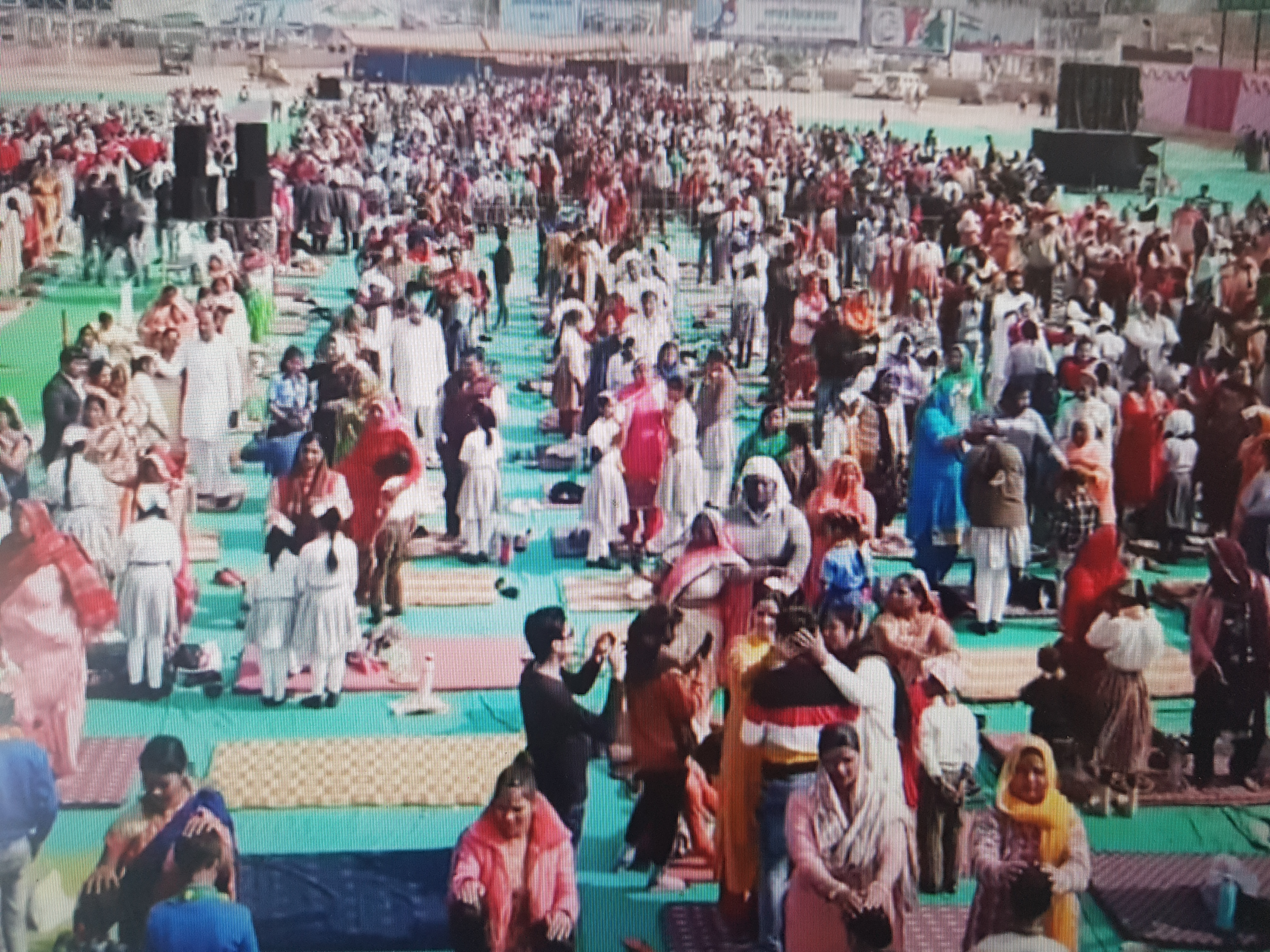

Parents' Worship Day, known as Matri Pitri Poojan Diwas (also Matru Pitru Poojan Divas) was started by Sant Shri Asaram Bapu Ji in 2007 as an alternative to Valentine's Day.

It is celebrated on 14 FEB every year. It is based on the Sanskrit words for mother (मातृ, mātṛ) and father (पितृ, pitŕ).

== History ==
The day was first celebrated on "14 February 2006" at Sant Shri Asharamji's Gurukul, Ahmedabad.

This festival draws its inspiration from the pujan of Shiva and Parvati performed by Ganesha. In India, Valentine's Day is being substituted with "Parents Worship Day", a celebration of love between parents and their children, amid concerns about teenage pregnancy.

According to The Hindu, the Indian state of Chhattisgarh has been celebrating Matru-Pitru Pujan Diwas since 2012, on the advice of Asharamji bapu. It is officially celebrated by the Chhattisgarh Govt in schools and colleges as ordered by the Chief Minister Raman Singh.

In 2013 some schools & colleges in Bhubaneswar started to celebrate the Parents Worship Day.

In 2015 the state government led by the Bharatiya Janata Party made it an official celebration. In 2015 the right wing political party Akhil Bharatiya Hindu Mahasabha endorsed the day. On 14 February 2015, it was celebrated on a large scale by an NGO Bhartiya Yuwa Shakthi at the Chhatrapati Shivaji Krida Mandal, Nehru Nagar, Kurla. The event imparted theoretical and practical values to parents and children. It was celebrated by Sanatan Dharma Sabha in Jammu in 2015, 2016, and 2017.

In 2017 the District collector in Madhya Pradesh issued a notice for schools, youth and urged people to celebrate 14 February as Matru-Pitru Pujan Diwas.

In December 2017, the education minister of Jharkhand, Neera Yadav issued a notice to celebrate the day in 40,000 government schools in the state in 2018.

In 2018, Gujarat Technological University and Swaminarayan Institute of Technology celebrated Parents Worship Day to reaffirm respect towards Parents.

In 2019, Gujarat Education Minister, Bhupendrasinh Chudasama appreciated the initiative of celebrating 14 February as Matru Pitru Pujan Diwas.

In 2020, Gujarat Education department told schools to organize Parents Worship Day on 14 February in order to nurture best values from childhood and to protect Indian culture.

In 2024, Education minister Madan Dilawar of Rajasthan mentioned about the plan to conduct Parents Worship Day celebration from the next academic session.

== Celebration ==
=== Matru Pitru Poojan Diwas ===
Matru Pitru Poojan Diwas (MPPD) also called Matra Pitra Pujan Divas is a festival initiated by Asaramji bapu. On this day, children from all religions worship their parents and seek their blessings by offering them tilak, garland. It is seen by many as a method to cement the bond between family members and to imbibe good values like respect, obedience and humility in children. Right wing activists claim that it is an alternate method to counter teenage pregnancy. In several states like Maharashtra, Haryana, Odisha, Chhattisgarh, Madhya Pradesh, Valentine's Day has been officially renamed as Matru-Pitru Pujan Diwas.

As per Directorate of Public Instructions, every year February 14 is celebrated as Parents' Worship Day instead of Valentine's Day in Chhattisgarh. Parents are invited to schools and children worship them by performing aarti and offering sweets.

=== Abba Ammi Ibadat Diwas ===
Muslim students expressed love for parents by celebrating the day as 'Abba Ammi Ibadat Diwas'.
