= Narayan Sai =

Indian spiritual leader (born:1972)

- Born: Narayan Harpalani; 29 January 1972 (age 54); Ahmedabad, Gujarat, India
- Occupation: Spiritual Leader
- Parent: Asaram (Father)
- Status: In Prison
- Convictions: Rape, 2019
- Criminal charges: Rape
- Penalty: Life imprisonment
- Accomplice: Asaram

Details
- Location: India
- Date apprehended: 4 December 2013
- Imprisoned at: Lajpor Jail, Surat

Narayan Sai (born 29 January 1972), also known as Narayan Prem Sai is the son of the Indian spiritual leader Asaram. He and his father are serving life in prison for rape and other crimes. He was mentioned in a list of fake sadhus released by Akhil Bharatiya Akhara Parishad, the apex organisation of Hindu Sants (saints) and Sadhus (ascetics) in India.

The Gujarat Police estimate that Narayan Prem Sai has properties and investments worth more than Rs. 5,000 crore. Narayan Sai is married to Jankidevi. They were married for 10 years as of April 2016. In a deposition given in 2016, she described their relationship was "not cordial like it should be between husband and wife," and that Sai spent most of his time with the women of his father's ashram.

Sai was charged with molestation after a Surat-based woman who lodged an FIR against him in Jahangirpura Police Station of Surat, accusing him of exploitation and repeated rape between 2002 and 2005. He evaded arrest for two months and was apprehended and arrested on 4 December 2013 in a combined operation of Delhi, Gujarat, Punjab and Haryana police along the Delhi-Haryana border, and brought to Surat for custody. On 6 December the High Court of Gujarat dismissed his status as absconder, however he remained under judicial custody since. Sai was also accused of bribing the local authorities holding him in custody in an attempt to have the case of sexual abuse against him weakened or dismissed. Narayan Sai was released from Surat Jail on interim bail on 26 May 2015 to attend to his ailing mother Laxmi Devi in Ahmedabad.

On 26 April 2019, Narayan Sai was convicted under Indian Penal Code sections 376 (rape), 377 (unnatural offences), 323 (assault), 506-2 (criminal intimidation) and 120-B (conspiracy) by Surat Court and sentenced to life imprisonment. Narayan Sai was also fined Rs Five lakh.
