= Alok Verma =

Former CBI Director

Alok Kumar Verma
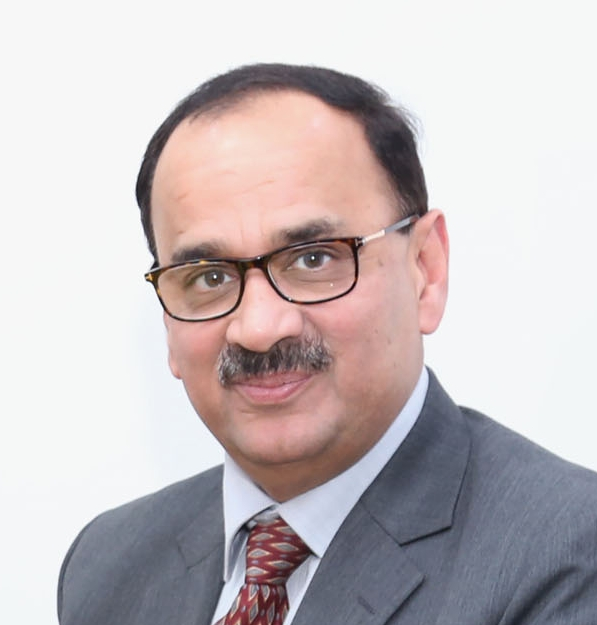

Director General of Central Bureau of Investigation
- In office 1 February 2017 – 10 January 2019
- Preceded by: Rakesh Asthana (acting)
- Succeeded by: M. Nageswara Rao (interim)

Personal details
- Born: 13 July 1957 (age 69) New Delhi, India
- Education: M.A. (History)
- Alma mater: St. Xavier's School, Delhi; St. Stephen's College; Delhi University
- Police career
- Country: India
- Batch: 1990
- Cadre: Arunachal Pradesh-Goa-Mizoram and Union Territories (AGMUT)

Alok Kumar Verma (born 13 July 1957) is a retired 1979 batch IPS officer of the Arunachal Pradesh-Goa-Mizoram and Union Territories cadre, who served as the director of the Central Bureau of Investigation in India. He also served as Commissioner of Delhi Police and Director General of Tihar Jail. Verma has over 39 years of experience in the Indian Police Service (IPS).

Alok Kumar Verma was the 27th Director of the CBI, the highest executive position in the premier federal agency a position which he held until removed from his post by a majority of the High Powered Committee (consisting of the PM, a CJI appointee and the Opposition Leader). Verma's removal caused controversy in India and was questioned by legal experts and opposition leaders because of the absence of any evidence to prove allegations of corruption that had been levelled against him. Honorable Retired Justice A.K. Patnaik, who was appointed by the Court to monitor the enquiry being conducted by the CVC, termed the decision of the committee as very hasty and indicated that there was no evidence of corruption against Alok Kumar Verma. The move to remove him was also criticised widely in the press by various luminaries.

== Biography ==
Alok Kumar Verma attended St. Xavier's School, Delhi. He completed his post graduate education in History at St. Stephen's College, Delhi.

Having joined the Indian Police Service in 1979 at the age of 22, Verma was assigned to the AGMU Cadre. He was the youngest officer in his batch. Before assuming the office of Commissioner of Police, Delhi, Alok Kumar Verma headed several organisations. He was Director General of Prisons, Delhi; Director General of Police (DGP) in Mizoram; DGP in Puducherry and Inspector General of Police (IGP) for Andaman & Nicobar Islands. During his service, Verma held several important positions. He served in Delhi as Special Commissioner of Police for Crime, Vigilance and Intelligence respectively, also as Joint Commissioner of the Crime branch; Joint Commissioner of Police, New Delhi Range and Deputy Commissioner, South District. His second-last posting was as the CBI head, his 24th posting as a police officer, following which Verma was transferred to the position of Director General of Fire Safety, Civil Defence and Home Guards but he refused the post.

Along with Rakesh Asthana, Special Director CBI, Verma was entangled in a corruption controversy: both accused each other of bribery and on the recommendation of the Central Vigilance Commission, both were subsequently asked by the government to go on leave. Munsif, the Urdu broadsheet, on October 26 writes of the CBI affair as being one where "matters are not as simple as it seem". Consequently, Verma went to the Supreme Court of India and Asthana to Delhi High Court, both of them appealing the recommendation. The Supreme Court canceled the decision to send Verma on leave and Verma was reinstated as CBI director two months later with the instruction that he not take any major decisions until the selection committee decided his fate over the corruption charges. After one day, the selection committee agreed that Verma be transferred to the position of Director General of Fire Safety, Civil Defence and Home Guard. The decision of the committee was based on a CVC report submitted to the SC in sealed covers. The CVC had been instructed by the SC to complete its investigation within two weeks under the direct supervision of former retired SC judge Justice A.K. Patnaik. The CVC concluded the inquiry with a written report on the charges levelled against Verma. Later, Justice Patnaik said, "There was no evidence against Verma regarding corruption. The entire inquiry was held on Asthana's complaint. I have said in my report that none of the findings in the CVC's report are mine." Justice Patnaik also said, "The CVC report along with annexures ran to more than 1,000 pages. I am surprised the selection committee members could go through all the 1,000 pages in such a short period of time, appreciate the evidence and take the decision that Verma should be shunted out from the CBI Director's post. It would have been better had the selection committee taken a little more time to appreciate the evidence and taken an informed decision."

In a subsequent press release Verma said that he was trying to "uphold CBI's integrity" but was removed as a result of a baseless allegation by one person (Asthana) who was inimical to him. In his letter to the DoPT, Verma said that he did not get an opportunity to present his case and wrote that "Natural justice was scuttled and the entire process was turned upside down in ensuring that the undersigned is removed from the post of the Director CBI." The Former Chief Justice of India, Justice T.S. Thakur, also articulated his opinion in detail on the removal of CBI Director Alok Verma stating that "if the selection committee that removed Alok Verma as CBI director did not give him adequate opportunity to present his point of view, it amounts to a violation of the principles of natural justice."

The entire controversy of Verma's removal has questioned the independence of the CBI as a premier investigating agency in the country. Former Chief Justice of India, R.M. Lodha who coined the phrase "caged parrot" for the Central Bureau of Investigation's plight as a prisoner of government's demands also commented on how its independence needed to be preserved.

=== Dates of rank in IPS ===
- Assistant Commissioner of Police, Delhi – 1979
- Additional Superintendent of Police (HQ), Aizawl, Mizoram – 1983
- Deputy Commissioner of Police, Delhi Armed Police – 1985
- Deputy Commissioner of Police (Traffic), Delhi – 1987
- Superintendent of Police, Upper Subansiri District, Arunachal Pradesh – 1988
- Superintendent of Police, South Goa – 1990
- Superintendent of Police, South Goa – 1991
- Deputy Commissioner of Police, Delhi North – 1992
- Joint Commissioner of Police (HQ), Delhi - 1993
- Deputy Inspector General of Police, Central Vigilance – Intelligence - 1994
- Joint Commissioner of Police (Range), Delhi - 1996
- Deputy Inspector General of Police, Mizoram Range – 1998
- Inspector General of Police, Andaman & Nicobar Islands – 2001
- Addl. Commissioner of Police, Delhi – 2004
- Special Commissioner of Police (North), Railway Protection Force – 2007
- Director General of Police, Pondicherry – 2008
- Special Commissioner of Police, Intelligence, Delhi – 2012
- Director General of Police, Mizoram – 2012
- Director General of Police, Tihar Jail – 2014
- Commissioner of Police, Delhi – 2016
- Director, Central Bureau of Investigation – 2017
- Director, Central Bureau of Investigation – 2019

== Awards ==
Alok Kumar Verma was decorated with the President's Police Medal for Distinguished Service in 2003 and Police Medal for Meritorious Service in 1997.
