= Delhi Police =

Law enforcement agency in Delhi, India

- Abbreviation: DP
- Motto: शांति सेवा न्याय; Shanti Seva Nyaya; Peace, Service, Justice

Agency overview
- Formed: 1861; 165 years ago (originally founded as a security force under the British rule); 16 February 1948; 78 years ago (renamed as Delhi Police)
- Preceding agency: Municipal Police
- Employees: 83,762
- Annual budget: ₹12,503.65 crore (US$1.3 billion) (2026-27)

Jurisdictional structure
- Operations jurisdiction: Delhi, IN
- Districts of Delhi Police
- Area: 1,484 km^{2} (573 sq mi)
- Population: 21,500,000
- Governing body: Ministry of Home Affairs, Government of India
- General nature: Local civilian police

Operational structure
- Headquarters: Jai Singh Marg, New Delhi, Delhi, India
- Elected officer responsible: Amit Shah, Minister of Home Affairs
- Agency executive: Anurag Kumar, IPS, Commissioner of Police

Facilities
- Stations: 198 (including 20 specialized)
- Helicopters: 1

Website
- delhipolice.gov.in

The Delhi Police (DP) is the police force of the National Capital Territory of Delhi. It is under the Ministry of Home Affairs, Government of India. In 2024, the sanctioned strength of Delhi Police was 83,762 (including I.R. Battalions) making it one of the largest metropolitan police forces in the world. About 25% of Delhi Police strength is earmarked for VIP security.

== History ==
Delhi Police traces its history back to a small security force, established in 1854, under the assistant of British Resident to the Mughal Imperial Courts. In 1861, after the adoption of the Indian Police Act, Delhi Police remained a part of the Punjab Police until India gained independence in 1947. The first five police stations inaugurated in Delhi under this act were Sadar Bazaar, Sabzi Mandi, Mehrauli, and Mundka.

== Organisation ==
=== Before formation ===
Before 1948, the Delhi Police was a part of the Punjab Police.

=== 1948–1966 ===
In 1948, the Delhi Police was restructured. Mr D.W. Mehra became the first chief of Delhi Police. The strength of the Delhi Police in 1951 was about 8,000 with one Inspector General of Police (IGP) and eight Superintendents of Police (SP). In 1956, a post of Deputy Inspector General of Police was created. In 1961, the strength of Delhi police was over 12,000.

In 1966, the Delhi Police on the basis of the Khosla Commission Report was reorganised. Four police districts, namely, North, Central, South and New Delhi were created. In 1978, the Delhi Police Act was passed and the Commissioner System was introduced with effect from 1 July 1978.

J.N. Chaturvedi, with rank of IGP, became first Commissioner of Delhi Police from October 1978 – Jan 1980.

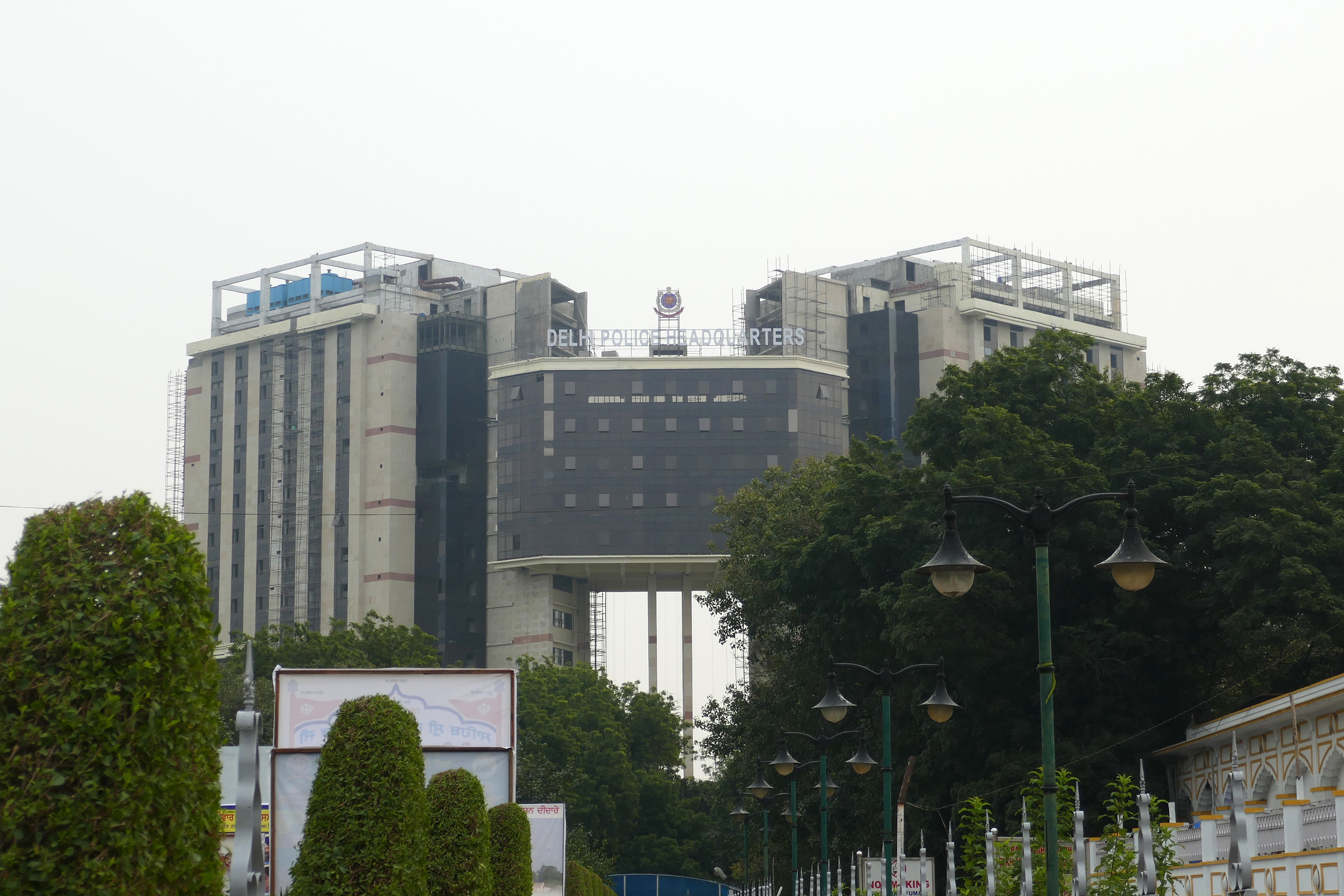
Headquarters of Delhi Police

=== Impact of Sixth Central Pay Commission ===
Following the Sixth Central Pay Commission, the UPA Government, in 2008, decided to make promotions for Indian Police Service officers, even for higher ranks, time-bound. Indian Police Service officers are now promoted on a fixed time table, more or less independent of functional requirements or span of responsibility, up to the level of Inspector General of Police, at intervals of 4, 9, 13, 14, and 18 years of service. The time-bound promotion, much of it non-functional, to high ranks apart from increasing the burden on the policing budget has made Delhi Police top-heavy, sluggish, and unwieldy. Delhi Police, which had one Inspector General (IG) until January 1980s, now has 12 officers with ranks senior to IGPs. They are called Commissioners and Special Commissioners, who are in the HAG grades and apex pay grades. In addition, Delhi police, instead of one IGP, has several dozen IGPs, as everyone gets to be IGP after completion of 18 years service. New IG's functions and responsibilities are no different from that of pre-1980s DIGs and Superintendents of Police (SPs).

=== Current organisation ===
The Delhi Police is headed by a Commissioner of Police (CP), who is a senior officer of the Indian Police Service (IPS) holding the rank of Director General of Police (DGP). The Commissioner is appointed by the Government of India and reports directly to the Union Ministry of Home Affairs, as Delhi is a National Capital Territory. The Delhi Police is structurally divided into multiple specialized wings, each responsible for distinct aspects of policing and law enforcement. These include Law & Order, Crime, Traffic, Armed Police, Special Cell, Vigilance, Security, Intelligence Division, Economic Offences Wing, Human Resources Division, Police Transport, among others. Each of these wings is headed by a Special Commissioner of Police (Spl. CP), who holds the rank of Director General (DG) or Additional Director General (ADG). The department is governed under the Delhi Police Act of 1978.

For the maintenance of law and order, the Delhi Police is divided into two zones—South (L&O) and North (L&O)—each headed by a Special Commissioner of Police (Spl. CP). These police zones comprise several police ranges led by Joint Commissioners or Additional Commissioners of Police, further divided into police districts headed by Deputy Commissioners of Police (DCPs). Each district includes multiple subdivisions, managed by Assistant Commissioners of Police (ACPs), and police stations, overseen by Inspectors designated as Station House Officers (SHOs).

As of January 2019, the Delhi Police consists of 2 police zones, 6 police ranges, 15 police districts, and 66 police subdivisions, which include 178 territorial police stations. In addition, there are 7 railway police stations, 16 metro rail police stations, and 5 specialized crime units designated as police stations: the Economic Offenses Wing, Crime Branch, Special Cell, Special Police Unit for Women and Children (SPUWAC), and Vigilance.

In December 2025, the Delhi Police was reported to have a shortage of over 9,200 personnel, with a sanctioned strength of 92,000, although the police to population ratio stood at close to 400 per 100,000 population, which is higher than national average of 153. According to Minister of State for Home Affairs Nityanand Rai, the vacancy ranged across DCP to constable ranks - 13 out of 60 for DCP, 125 out of 346 for ACP, 108 out of 1,453 for Inspectors, 300 out of 7,320 for Sub-Inspectors, 3,057 out of 23,724 for Head Constables, and 4,591 out of 50,946 for Constables.

== Controversies ==
Delhi Police has often been reported as one of the most corrupt police forces in India, with the highest number of complaints in the Indian Police Services being registered against its personnel.

Over the years, Delhi Police has been involved in a series of controversies; ranging from custodial deaths, refusal to write First Information Report, accepting bribes, inaction and collusion with criminals.

In September 2008, in an apparent case of moral policing, an officer from Delhi Police filed a case of obscenity against a married couple for kissing in the Dwarka court complex under the Indian Penal Code. The couple subsequently appealed in the Delhi High Court. The Court noted that even though the charge-sheet claimed that the case was filed because passersby were offended, no one was mentioned by name. The Court subsequently stated that kissing in public by married couples cannot be termed obscene. The Court passed its verdict on 25 May 2009 and ordered the police department to drop the case against the couple, as well as pay compensation of ₹5,000 to both husband and wife for moral policing.

In December 2012, Delhi Police came under serious criticism following the Nirbhaya case. Following the outrage in the aftermath, public protests took place in New Delhi on 21 December 2012 at India Gate and Raisina Hill, the latter being the location of both the Parliament of India and Rashtrapati Bhavan, the official residence of the President of India. Thousands of protesters clashed with police and battled Rapid Action Force units. Demonstrators were baton charged, shot with water cannon and tear gas shells, and arrested.

In 2022, the Central Bureau of Investigation (CBI) arrested a Delhi Police assistant sub-inspector and his associate in a bribery case after allegations that the officer demanded money in exchange for not arresting individuals involved in a criminal matter.

In the same year, the CBI arrested three Delhi Police personnel, including an inspector, in connection with an alleged bribery case at Kalindi Kunj Police Station. According to investigators, the officials allegedly demanded illegal payments in exchange for permitting construction activities in the area.

In 2023, two Delhi Police personnel were arrested by the CBI in a bribery investigation linked to alleged illegal payments related to construction activities in Sonia Vihar, Delhi.

== Crime in Delhi ==
'Heinous crime' in Delhi, in 2014, according to government statistics, increased by 157.13 percent from 3268 in 2013, to 8403 in 2014: Murder is up 7.4 percent from 416 to 447; Attempted murder by 36.11 percent from 457 to 622; Rape by 37.64 percent from 1230 to 1693; Burglary by 239.20 percent, from 2352 to 7978; and robbery by 429 percent. Neither the Government or the Police Commissioner gave explanation for the spurt in crime. However, since 2002, Delhi Police can avail the powers of Maharashtra Control of Organised Crime Act, when necessary, in tackling international crime syndicates like the Ndrangheta.

| | 04.2013-31-12 2013 | 2014– 31-12 2014 | Percent change | Comment |
|---|---|---|---|---|
| Murder | 416 | 447 | +7.45 | by comparison, in 2014, 328 were murdered in New York, a city with reputation for violent crime and higher weapon ownership |
| Attempted Murder | 457 | 662 | +36.11 | |
| Rape | 1230 | 1693 | +37.6 | |
| Robbery | 1024 | 5425 | +429.79 | |

== Rank insignia ==
Delhi Police gazetted officers rank insignia
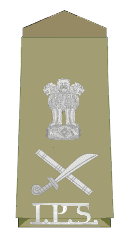
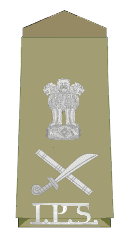
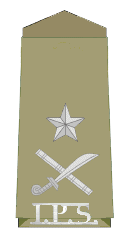
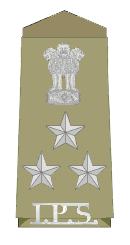
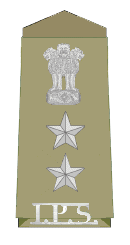
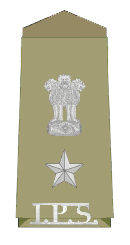
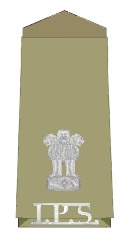
| Rank group | General / flag officers | | | | | Senior officers | | | Junior officers |
|---|---|---|---|---|---|---|---|---|---|
| Insignia |
| Rank / Designation | Commissioner of Police | Special Commissioner of Police | Joint Commissioner of Police | Additional Commissioner of Police | Deputy Commissioner of Police (SG) | Deputy Commissioner of Police | Additional Deputy Commissioner of Police | Assistant Commissioner of Police |
| Abbreviation | CP | Spl.CP | Jt.CP | Addl.CP | DCP (SG) | DCP | Addl.DCP | ACP |
| Equivalent ranks in state police | DGP | ADG | IGP | DIG | SSP (SG) | SP | Addl.SP | DSP |
* Note: Delhi Police follows the Commissionerate system. Designations like CP, Spl. CP, and Jt. CP are posts generally held by IPS officers of corresponding ranks. Note: ACP is the entry-level gazetted post, equivalent to ASP in IPS and DSP to SPS.

Delhi Police subordinate officers rank insignia
Insignia

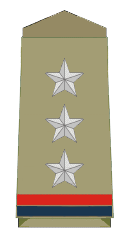

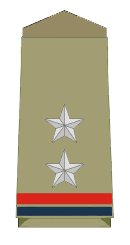

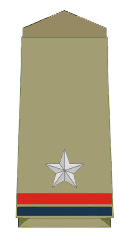

No insignia
Rank
Police Inspector
Sub Inspector
Assistant Sub Inspector
Head constable
Constable
Abbreviation
PI
SI
ASI
HC
Const.

== VIP security ==
Out of a total Delhi police strength of 77,965, in 2016, over 20,000 personnel or over 25 percent, were assigned to secure VVIPs in Delhi. Delhi Police Commissioner Alok Kumar Verma, arguing that the 20,000 officers earmarked for VIP security were inadequate, pitched for increasing the number of Delhi Police officers assigned to VVIP security from 20,000 to 22,500.

Verma stated that it was of the "utmost priority" that the number of police officers available for VVIP duties increased. He is expected to leverage the terror threat risk to get the extra 2250 police personnel, citing Ministry of Home Affairs, Intelligence Bureau, and Delhi police's special bureau threat assessments. The increase in Police strength for VVIP security will increase the deployment of police personnel per VIP from 17 to 19, and Police Deployment for VIP security from 25 percent to almost one third [28.8 percent] of its total strength.

The demand for increasing Police strength for Securing Delhi's VIP, at considerable cost, is against the background of worsening law and order situation in the rest of the city, especially the more deprived areas of the city of some 19 million people.

Delhi Police Deployment for VIPs
| VVIP | Police Deployment | Remarks |
|---|---|---|
| Prime Minister, Vice-President, Union ministers, judges, courts, and others categorized as Protected Persons and visiting protectees. | 7178 | Special Protection Group, which is force of over 2000 armed personnel, responsible for the PMs security is not included in this total |
| Near Prime Minister's Residence | 89 | seven police pickets are deployed permanently close to the PM's residence |
| Presidential Palace Or Rashtrapati Bhavan | 884 | Joint Commissioner of Delhi Police is in charge of this force. This Delhi Police Force contingent is in addition to elements of an infantry battalion from the Indian army deployed permanently in The presidents' palace, and the President's Body Guards. |
| Residences of ministers, MPs, and judges. | 2115 | |
| VVIP | 254 | |
| Total | 10,484 | Delhi Police Force for VIP security is headed by Special Commissioner of Delhi Police. This total does not include several hundred, possibly thousands, armed personnel deployed from Paramilitary forces of India such as the BSF, CISF, NSG, CRPF etc. as body and residential guards to secure Delhi's VVIPs. |

In addition Delhi Police deploys 79 Police Control Room Vehicles (Static and semi-static) in Lutyens' Delhi, where most of Delhi's VVIP live. 24 are exclusively for Members of Parliament (MPs). In addition Delhi Police provides static pickets, motor cycle patrol, and foot patrol, on 24-hour basis, including 39 static pickets, 17 motorcycle police patrols, and five Emergency Response Vehicles mounted patrols. The high police presence is supplemented with surveillance devices: 230 Close Circuit Television Cameras are located in North Avenue, South Avenue, MS MP flats, Narmada Apartment, Brahmaputra Apartment and Swarn Jayanti Complex. This is in addition to 412 CCTVs are installed at various roads leading to ministers and MP's residences in Lutyens' Delhi.

=== Intelligence Bureau ===
The Intelligence Bureau and the Ministry of Home Affairs are responsible for identifying and nominating persons deserving police protection. The level of police protection is decided by the Home Minister and the home Secretary. There are five categories of protection or security cover: Z+, Z, Y+, Y and X. Who will get which category of security cover is decided by Security Categorization Committee (SCC) — headed by the home secretary.

Armed Police protection to those designated as deserving protection by the Ministry of Home Affairs is provided by personnel drawn from central paramilitary forces under the home ministry such as the NSG, CRPF and CISF. In 2006 the CISF was mandated to raise a Special Security Group for VIP security. The unit came into being on 17 November 2006. This unit is responsible for the physical protection of highly threatened dignitaries/individuals, evacuation of Protected Persons, and providing static as well as mobile security to the Protected Persons".

In addition to the Ministry of Home Affairs and the Intelligence Bureau, the Delhi Police Commissioner is also authorized to extend police protection on the basis of reports by the Special Bureau of Delhi police.

In 2012, during the tenure of the Congress(I) led government, the Intelligence Bureau nominated 332 persons for protection; in 2016, under the BJP led NDA government, the number of people identified by Intelligence Bureau and Ministry of Home Affairs for police protection shot up to 454. A spokesperson of the Ministry of Home Affairs dismissed allegations that the list of persons given police protection is prepared arbitrarily. He said, "The number of protectees keeps changing depending on reports and inputs received from the security agencies. " Home Minister Rajnath Singh's predecessor Sushil Kumar Shinde, had explained that the persons nominated for protection "Only on the basis of recommendations from the Intelligence Bureau (IB)...We don't do it on our own," The current list includes nine expelled Congress MLAs from Uttarakhand who revolted against Harish Rawat and joined the BJP on 18 May 2016 . It includes the name of BJP's Kisan Morcha chief Vijay Pal Singh Tomar, Umesh Kumar, a journalist, who carried out a sting on chief minister Rawat.

In 2016 in Delhi categories of security cover was : 42 Z+, 55 Z; 72 Y+; 143 Y; 67 X category, 19 security under discretion of Special Commissioner of Police . Delhi police is responsible for providing security cover to 66.

== Vehicles ==
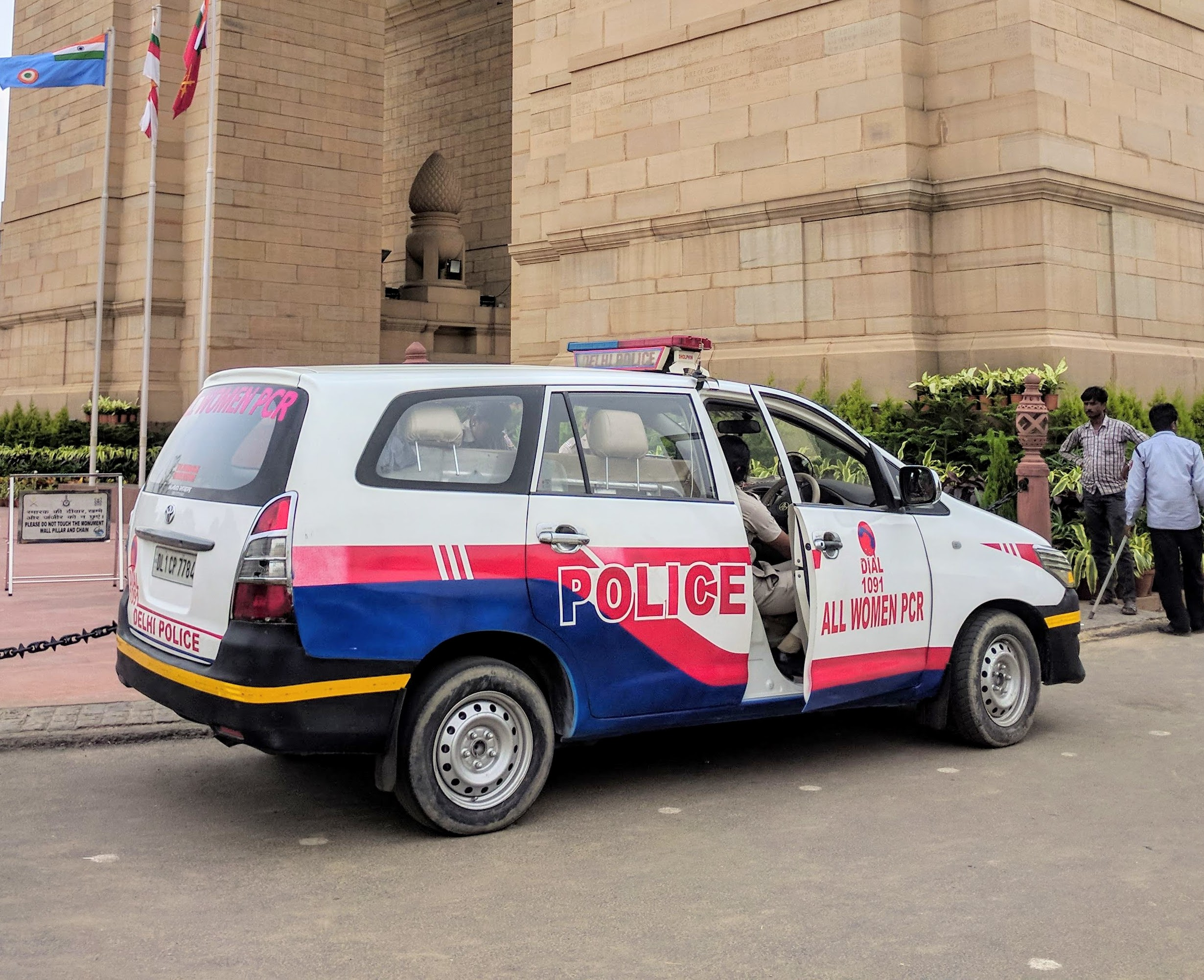
A Delhi Police All Women PCR vehicle. The car pictured is a Toyota Innova.

- Chevrolet Tavera
- Toyota Qualis
- Royal Enfield Bullet
- Bajaj Pulsar
- Maruti Gypsy
- Maruti Suzuki SX4
- Maruti Suzuki Ciaz
- TVS Apache
- SML Isuzu Prison Vans
- Tata LATC SWAT carrier
- Toyota Innova
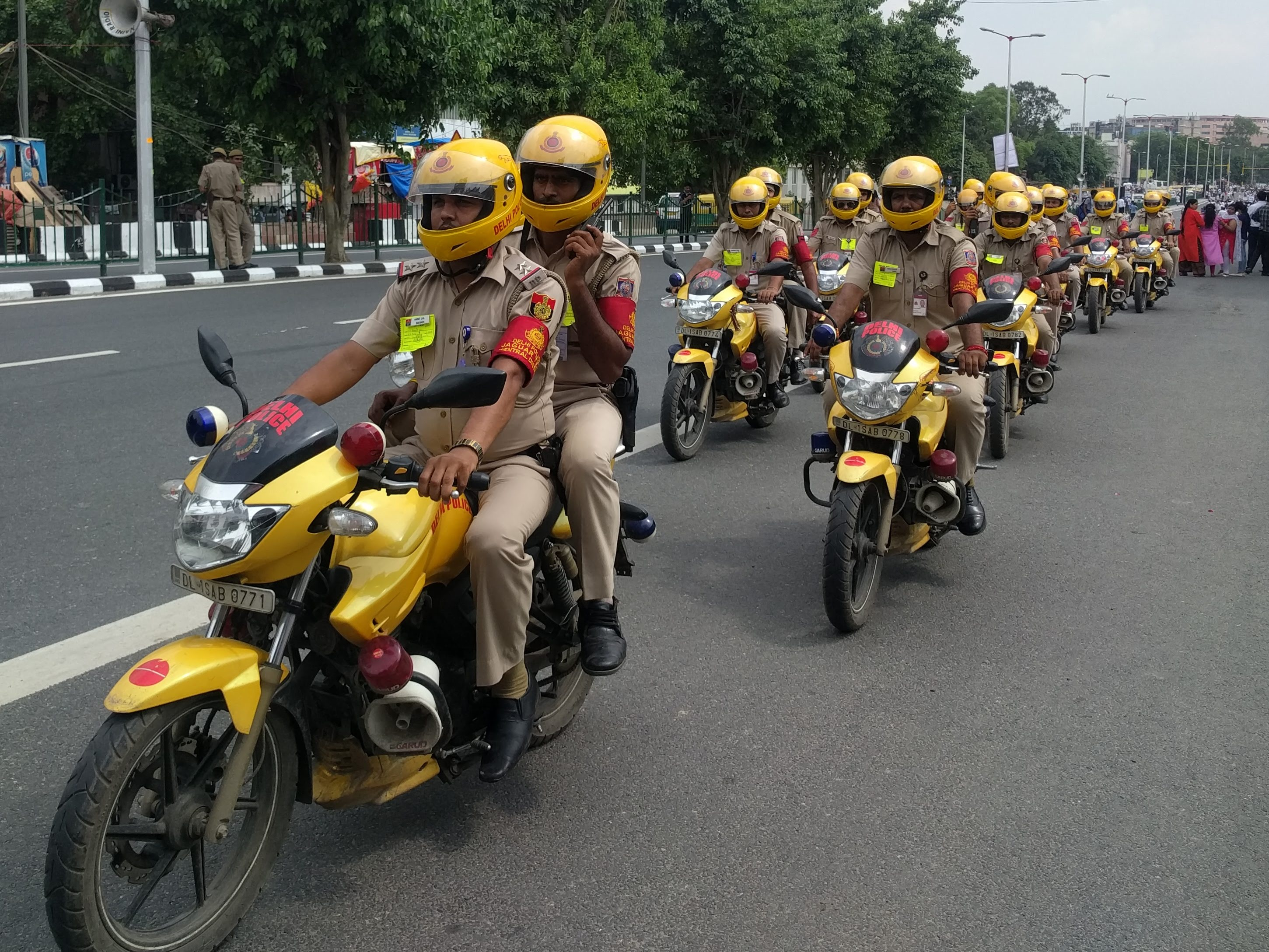
  Jaguar Team, Central District
- Mahindra Scorpio
- Maruti Ertiga

== SWAT team ==
The Special Weapons And Tactics commando unit was formed in 2009 in wake of 26/11, and saw action first in 2010 Commonwealth Games, they were tasked with protection duties. They are trained on the lines of National Security Guard. All the commandos are under 28 years of age, thus making them fit and capable of tasks meant for commandos. Their main work is to fight against any terrorist attack that occurs in Delhi NCR. They have been trained exclusively in Krav Maga. Delhi was one of the first cities to get an all-women SWAT team. SWAT team members will function under the elite Special Cell.

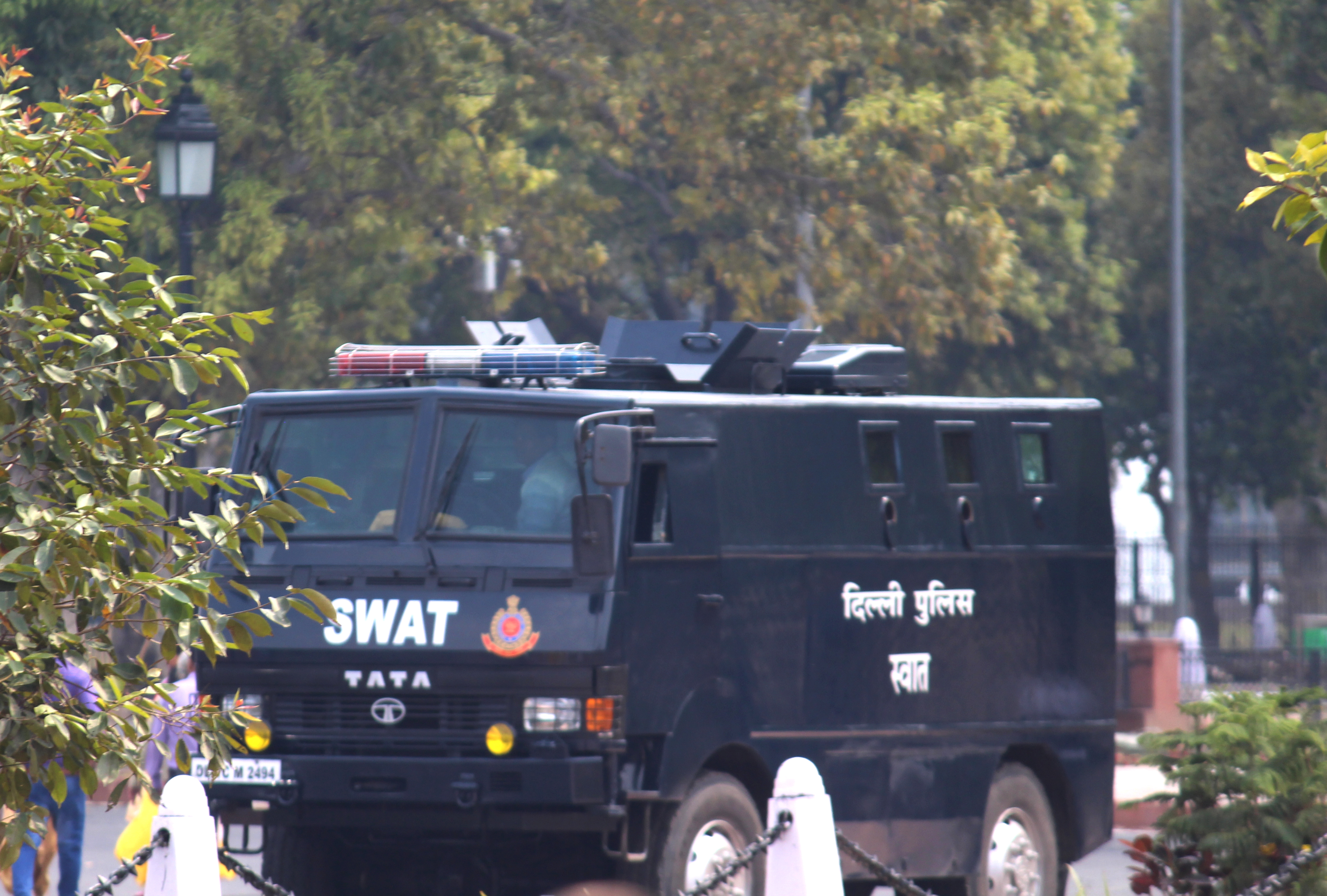
Delhi Police vehicle of Special Weapons And Tactics (SWAT)
