= List of Panjab University people =

This is a list of people affiliated with the Panjab University at Chandigarh. The list excludes people whose only connection with Panjab University is that they were awarded an honorary degree.

== Faculty ==
- Bidyendu Mohan Deb – Professor of theoretical chemistry between 1984 and 2004
- B. N. Goswamy – Professor of art history; known for his study of Indian miniature paintings
- Kewal Krishan (forensic anthropologist) – Professor and former chair of anthropology; known for contributions to forensic anthropology
- Kare Narain Pathak – Vice-Chancellor (2000–2006) and professor of physics (1970–2001); condensed matter physicist; UGC Emeritus Fellow

== Alumni ==
=== Arts and literature ===
- Amitoj – Punjabi poet
- Ohanna Shivanand – model, actress and software developer ||
- Jaspal Bhatti – satirist and TV personality
- Nuruddin Farah – Somali novelist
- Mukesh Gautam – Punjabi cinema director
- Mahie Gill – actress who appeared in Hindi films and Punjabi films
- Sunil Grover – comedian
- Rajesh Hamal – actor
- Irshad Kamil – Bollywood lyricist, poet and winner of Filmfare and IIFA Awards
- Anupam Kher – actor
- Ayushmann Khurrana – actor and singer
- Priyakanta Laishram – actor, film director, film producer, screenwriter and film editor
- Babbu Maan – Indian Punjabi singer and poet
- Kanika Mann – television and film actress
- Gul Panag – actress and model
- Harnaaz Sandhu – model who won Miss Universe 2021
- Satinder Sartaaj – Indian Punjabi singer and poet
- Kapil Sharma – Indian comedian

=== Business ===
- Sandeep Bakhshi – MD & CEO, ICICI Bank (Note: The Punjab Engineering College was affiliated to the Panjab University between 1953 and 2003.)
- Pratip Chaudhuri – Chairman of the State Bank of India
- Sunil Mittal – founder, Chairman and Group CEO of Bharti Enterprises
- Steve Sanghi – CEO of Microchip Technology
- Pam Kaur – CFO of HSBC Bank

=== Humanities and social sciences ===
- Harjinder Singh Dilgeer – historian; national professor of Sikh history; an authority on Sikh history, philosophy and scriptures; presently Director of G.N. Research Institute, Birmingham, England; author (Note: Wrote Sikh History in 10 Volumes, Translator of Guru Granth Sahib (in English), creator of Navan Te Vadda Mahan Kosh (4 volumes, 2748 pages), plus writer of 60 books.)
- Kavita Singh – academic and Infosys Prize winner
- Romila Thapar – prominent historian

=== Military ===
- Vikram Batra – Kargil war hero and Param Vir Chakra recipient

=== Politics and law ===
==== Heads of state and government ====
- Baburam Bhattarai – 36th Prime Minister of Nepal
- Manmohan Singh – 13th Prime Minister of India

==== Other politicians, civil servants, and lawyers ====
- Deepak Anand – Canadian politician
- Sunil Arora – IAS officer and Election Commissioner of India
- Sukhbir Singh Badal – Member of Parliament
- Kiran Bedi – first woman IPS officer
- Parminder Singh Brar – politician, sports administrator and lawyer
- William Gitau – first Governor of the Kiambu County
- Sherub Gyeltshen – member of the National Assembly (Bhutan) and Ministry of Home Affairs (Bhutan)
- Bhupinder Singh Hooda – former Chief Minister of Haryana
- Subodh Kumar Jaiswal – CBI director
- Sukhpal Singh Khaira – Member of the Legislative Assembly, Punjab, India
- Dalvir Singh Khangura –
- Jagdish Singh Khehar – 44th Chief Justice of India
- Swatanter Kumar – former Judge, Supreme Court of India
- Selja Kumari – MP/Union Minister
- Mehr Chand Mahajan – third Chief Justice of India and former Prime Minister of Jammu and Kashmir
- Tuhin Kanta Pandey – Chairman, Securities and Exchange Board of India
- Krishan Kant Paul – former IPS who is current governor of Uttrakhand and former governor of Meghalaya;executive director of UN Women
- Lakshmi Puri – India's ambassador to Hungary (with accreditation to Bosnia and Herzegovina), 1999–2002; UN Director of UN-OHRLLS, 2009–2011; Assistant Secretary-General for Intergovernmental Support and Strategic Partnerships at UN Women, 2011 until her retirement
- Amit Rawal – Judge of the Kerala High Court
- Abhinav Singh – Advocate, Commonwealth Historian, author, and International Researcher
- Rajiv Pratap Rudy – former Union minister
- T. V. Somanathan – Cabinet Secretary of India
- Sushma Swaraj – Former Minister of Foreign Affairs of India
- Jai Ram Thakur – Chief Minister of Himachal Pradesh
- Jagdeep Singh (judge) – Special Judge for the Central Bureau of Investigation (CBI)

=== Science and technology ===
- K. K. Aggarwal – engineer, professor and eminent IT expert
- Kalpana Chawla – NASA Astronaut. Died on 1 February 2003 in Space Shuttle Columbia accident
- Sardul Singh Guraya – Developmental biologist and Shanti Swarup Bhatnagar Prize recipient
- Atul Gurtu – high energy physicist
- Satinder Vir Kessar – organic chemist, Shanti Swarup Bhatnagar laureate
- Rajinder Kumar – chemical engineer, former professor at the Indian Institute of Science; Padma Bhushan recipient
- Narinder Kumar Mehra – immunologist
- Radhe Mohan – scientist, former Chairman of Medical Physics at the MD Anderson Cancer Center
- Manohar Lal Munjal – acoustical engineer, Shanti Swarup Bhatnagar laureate
- Yash Pal – scientist and educator
- G. V. R. Prasad – paleontologist, Shanti Swarup Bhatnagar laureate
- Sunil Saigal – Professor and a former dean of the Newark College of Engineering at NJIT, New Jersey
- Ranbir Chander Sobti – cell biologist and Padma Shri awardee
- Ajay K. Sood – Indian physicist and researcher currently serving as the 4th Principal Scientific Adviser to the GOI.
- Sampat Kumar Tandon – Geologist, A Shanti Swarup Bhatnagar laureate
- Veena Tandon – Parasitologist and Padma Shri recipient

=== Sports ===
- Nripjit Singh Bedi – volleyball player
- Ravi Bhardwaj – basketball player
- Neeraj Chopra – track and field athlete; 2020 Summer Olympics gold medalist in javelin; medalist in the Asian Games and Commonwealth Games
- Yashaswini Singh Deswal – shooter
- Malaika Goel – shooter
- Anjum Moudgil – shooter

=== Others ===
- Shekhar Gupta – journalist, founder and editor-in-chief of ThePrint
- Vandana Shiva – environmental activist
- Tarun Tejpal – founder-editor Tehelka
