= Director of the Central Bureau of Investigation =

Head of the Central Bureau of Investigation

- Seal of the Central Bureau of Investigation
- Incumbent; Praveen Sood, IPS since 23 May 2023
- Central Bureau of Investigation
- Reports to: Minister of Personnel, Public Grievances and Pensions (or the Prime Minister)
- Residence: CBI House, New Delhi Municipal Council, Bungalow 2, Janpath Rd, Near Dr. Manmohan Singh Residence, 3MLNP, Connaught Place, New Delhi.
- Seat: CGO Complex, Lodhi Road, New Delhi
- Appointer: The Government of India; (with recommendations from the Prime Minister, Lok Sabha Opposition leader (Note: If there are no official opposition in the Lok Sabha, then the leader of the single largest opposition will be there.) and the Chief Justice of India (Note: If the Chief Justice is unavailable then a senior judge of the Supreme Court of India nominated by him will be there.))
- Term length: Two years; Renewable thrice (one year each)
- Constituting instrument: The Delhi Special Police Establishment Act, 1946
- Precursor: Inspector-General of the Delhi Special Police Establishment
- Formation: 1 April 1963; 63 years ago
- First holder: D. P. Kohli, IPS
- Website: www.cbi.gov.in

The director of the Central Bureau of Investigation is the head of the Central Bureau of Investigation (CBI), an Indian federal crime investigating agency, who is responsible for its day-to-day operations. The CBI is the agency within the Ministry of Personnel, Public Grievances and Pensions, under the Government of India. The director reports to the Minister concerned.

The current CBI director is Praveen Sood, who has held his position since 25 May 2023.

The Director of the Central Bureau of Investigation (CBI) reports to the Minister of Personnel, Public Grievances and Pensions, a portfolio generally held by the Prime Minister of India or sometimes a senior Cabinet minister.

== Term of office ==
The term for the director of CBI is initially fixed for two years. The director is appointed by the Union Government on the advice and consent from the Appointment Committee, as per the Delhi Special Police Establishment (DPSE) Act, 1946, and amended through the Central Vigilance Commission (CVC) Act, 2003 and The Lokpal and Lokayuktas Act, 2013. The term can be renewed by the Committee up to one year with not more than three years of extension.

== Appointment ==
The Appointment Committee appoints the director from the list nominated by the Selection Committee team. The team consists of the Chief Vigilance Commissioner (ex-officio chairperson), two members of the Central Vigilance Commission, the Home Secretary, and the Personnel Secretary of India. The director must be a senior Indian Police Service officer and in the rank of Director General of Police (DGP).

After that, the Appointment Committee will select the name from the list. The committee consist of the Prime Minister of India (as chairperson), the Leader of the Opposition in Lok Sabha (or the leader of single largest opposition party, as amended by DSPE (Amendment) Act, 2014 during the Modi government) and the Chief Justice of India (or a Supreme Court Judge nominated by him).

== Responsibility ==
As head of the agency, the director supervises all the work in the CBI and is responsible for the constitution of investigating teams for probing cases. The Selection Committee consults with the director before the appointment committee for the appointments to the other officers in the CBI, with the rank of a superintendent or above.

== Dismissals ==
The Government can dismiss the director through the recommendations of the same Appointment Committee. D. Sen was removed after charges were made against him for the misuse of power during the emergency period declared by Indira Gandhi, as per the report made by Shah Commission.

In September 2018, director Alok Verma's deputy Rakesh Asthana filed a complaint against him in Central Vigilance Commission. Verma charged Asthana with bribery charges. Later, Narendra Modi's government asked both of them "on forced leave" and appointed Mannem Nageswara Rao for an interim period. The Supreme Court of India, in January 2019, reinstated Verma as the director. But after a few days, the committee, with a 2:1 vote, decided to remove Verma from office. Modi and Supreme Court judge Arjan Kumar Sikri consented in favor, while Congress leader in Lok Sabha Mallikarjun Kharge dissented.

== List of the directors ==
| No. | Name of the director | Start of tenure | End of tenure | Duration of service | Prime Minister during appointment | Ref. |
|---|---|---|---|---|---|---|
| 1. | D. P. Kohli | 1 April 1963 | 31 May 1968 | 5 years, 60 days | Jawaharlal Nehru | |
| 2. | F. V. Arul | 31 May 1968 | 6 May 1971 | 2 years, 340 days | Indira Gandhi | |
| 3. | D. Sen | 6 May 1971 | 29 March 1977 | 5 years, 327 days | Indira Gandhi | |
| 4. | S. N. Mathur | 29 March 1977 | 2 May 1977 | 34 days | Morarji Desai | |
| 5. | C. V. Narsimhan | 2 May 1977 | 25 November 1977 | 207 days | Morarji Desai | |
| 6. | John Lobo | 25 November 1977 | 30 June 1979 | 1 year, 217 days | Morarji Desai | |
| 7. | R. D. Singh | 30 June 1979 | 24 January 1980 | 208 days | Morarji Desai | |
| 8. | J. S. Bajwa | 24 January 1980 | 28 February 1985 | 5 years, 35 days | Indira Gandhi | |
| 9. | M. G. Katre | 28 February 1985 | 31 October 1989 | 4 years, 245 days | Rajiv Gandhi | |
| 10. | A. P. Mukherjee | 31 October 1989 | 11 January 1990 | 106 days | Rajiv Gandhi | |
| - | R. Shekar (acting) | 11 January 1990 | 14 February 1990 | 34 days | V. P. Singh | |
| - | Vijay Karan (acting) | 14 February 1990 | | 1 day | V. P. Singh | |
| 11. | S. K. Dutta | 14 February 1990 | 31 July 1993 | 3 years, 167 days | V. P. Singh | |
| 12. | K. Vijayarama Rao | 31 July 1993 | 31 July 1996 | 3 years, 0 days | P. V. Narasimha Rao | |
| 13. | Joginder Singh | 31 July 1996 | 30 June 1997 | 334 days | H. D. Deve Gowda | |
| 14. | R. C. Sharma | 30 June 1997 | 31 January 1998 | 215 days | I. K. Gujral | |
| - | D. R. Karthikeyan (acting) | 31 January 1998 | 31 March 1998 | 59 days | Atal Bihari Vajpayee | |
| - | T. N. Mishra (acting) | 31 March 1998 | 4 January 1999 | 279 days | Atal Bihari Vajpayee | |
| 15. | R. K. Raghavan | 4 January 1999 | 1 April 2001 | 2 years, 87 days | Atal Bihari Vajpayee | |
| 16. | P. C. Sharma | 1 April 2001 | 6 December 2003 | 2 years, 249 days | Atal Bihari Vajpayee | |
| 17. | U. S. Misra | 6 December 2003 | 6 December 2005 | 2 years, 0 days | Atal Bihari Vajpayee | |
| 18. | Vijay Shanker Tiwari | 12 December 2005 | 31 July 2008 | 2 years, 232 days | Manmohan Singh | |
| 19. | Ashwani Kumar | 2 August 2008 | 30 November 2010 | 2 years, 120 days | Manmohan Singh | |
| 20. | A P Singh | 30 November 2010 | 30 November 2012 | 2 years, 0 days | Manmohan Singh | |
| 21. | Ranjit Sinha | 3 December 2012 | 2 December 2014 | 1 year, 364 days | Manmohan Singh | |
| 22. | Anil Sinha | 3 December 2014 | 2 December 2016 | 1 year, 365 days | Narendra Modi | |
| - | Rakesh Asthana (interim) | 3 December 2016 (Note: As Additional Charge, while serving as additional director in CBI.) | 1 February 2017 | 60 days | Narendra Modi | |
| 23. | Alok Verma | 1 February 2017 | 1 February 2019 (Note: Rao was appointed as interim director when Special Director Asthana and Director Verma were asked to take leave by the Union Government, when both of them faced allegations against each other.) | 2 years, 0 days | Narendra Modi | |
| - | M. Nageswara Rao (interim) | 24 October 2018 | 10 January 2019 | 74 days | Narendra Modi | |
| 24. | Rishi Kumar Shukla | 2 February 2019 | 2 February 2021 | 2 years, 0 days | Narendra Modi | |
| - | Praveen Sinha (interim) | 2 February 2021 | 25 May 2021 | 112 days | Narendra Modi | |
| 25. | Subodh Kumar Jaiswal | 25 May 2021 | 25 May 2023 | 2 years, 0 days | Narendra Modi | |
| 26. | Praveen Sood | 25 May 2023 | Incumbent | 3 years, 171 days | Narendra Modi | |
