= D. P. Kohli =

Director of, Indian Central Investigation Agency

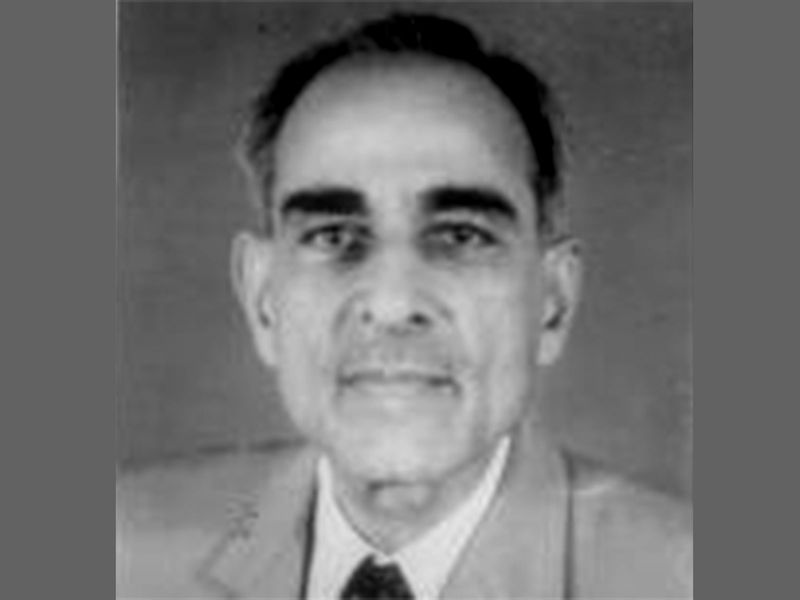

Director of the Central Bureau of Investigation
- In office 1 April 1963 – 31 May 1968
- Succeeded by: F. V. Arul

Dharamnath Prasad Kohli was the founder Director of the CBI, India's Central Investigation Agency. He held office from 1 April 1963 to 31 May 1968. Before this, he was Inspector-General of Police of the Special Police Establishment from 1955 to 1963. Prior to that, he was police chief in Madhya Bharat and Uttar Pradesh states. He was awarded the Padma Bhushan in 1967 for his distinguished services by Government of India.

While inaugurating the 4th Biennial Joint Conference of the CBI and State Anti-Corruption Officers, Kohli told the delegates

The public expects the highest standard from you both in efficiency and integrity. That faith has to be sustained. The motto of the CBI - Industry, Impartiality and Integrity: these must always guide your work. Loyalty to duty must come first, everywhere, at all times and in all circumstances.

Since 1999, the CBI has held the annual "DP Kohli Memorial Lecture" In Delhi, in his honour.
