= Rishi Kumar Shukla =

Indian Police Service officer

Honourable Rishi Kumar Shukla

Director of Central Bureau of Investigation
- In office 2 February 2019 – 2 February 2021
- Appointed by: Appointments Committee of the Cabinet
- Preceded by: Mannem Nageswara Rao
- Succeeded by: Subodh Kumar Jaiswal

Director General of Police of Madhya Pradesh
- In office 1 July 2016 – 1 February 2019
- Appointed by: Appointments Committee of the Cabinet

Personal details
- Born: 23 August 1960 (age 65) Gwalior, Madhya Pradesh, India

Rishi Kumar Shukla (born 23 August 1960) is a retired IPS officer and a former director of Central Bureau of Investigation (CBI), from 2 February 2019 to 2 February 2021.

== Education ==
Shukla has a post graduate qualification in Philosophy.

== Career ==
Rishi Kumar Shukla is a 1983 batch Indian Police Service (IPS) officer. After his training stint at the National Police Academy, he was posted in Shivpuri, Damoh, Raipur, and Mandsaur districts of Madhya Pradesh and Chhattisgarh. He has trained in crisis management and negotiations in the United States, and was briefly associated with the Intelligence Bureau handling sensitive cases.

Prior to being appointed as the director of the CBI, he was appointed the director general of Madhya Pradesh Police in 2016 and the chairman of the Madhya Pradesh Police Housing Corporation in Bhopal.
