= Joginder Singh (police officer) =

Indian police officer

Director of the Central Bureau of Investigation
- In office 31 July 1996 – 30 June 1997
- Appointed by: Prime Minister H.D. Deve Gowda
- Preceded by: K. Vijayarama Rao
- Succeeded by: R.C. Sharma

Personal details
- Born: 1940
- Died: 3 February 2017 (aged 76–77) Delhi, India
- Website: cbi.gov.in

Joginder Singh (c. 1940 – 3 February 2017) was an Indian Police Service (IPS) officer of the 1961 Karnataka cadre, who served as the Director of the Central Bureau of Investigation (CBI) from 31 July 1996, to 30 June 1997. Known for leading high-profile investigations into the Bofors scandal, Bihar fodder scam, and JMM bribery case, he was a vocal critic of political interference in the CBI. Singh authored over 25 books, including Inside CBI and Make a Way Where There is None, and wrote columns on corruption, terrorism, and governance. His tenure was marked by controversy, including his premature dismissal in 1997.

== Early life ==
Joginder Singh was born around 1940 in India. He joined the Indian Police Service in 1961 at the age of 20, selected for the Karnataka cadre.

== Career ==
Singh held several significant roles during his IPS career. He served as Superintendent of Police in Bihar, Deputy Inspector General and Inspector General in Karnataka, Director General of the Indo-Tibetan Border Police (ITBP), and Director General of the Narcotics Control Bureau. He also acted as Special Home Secretary in Karnataka and Special Secretary in the Union Home Ministry, leading delegations to the UK, USA, Germany, and France.

Appointed CBI Director on July 31, 1996, by Prime Minister H.D. Deve Gowda, Singh led investigations into major cases, including the Bofors scandal, Bihar fodder scam involving Lalu Prasad, JMM bribery case, securities scam, and urea scam. He secured critical Swiss bank documents in Bern for the Bofors case in 1997, a significant milestone in the investigation.

His tenure was controversial, with critics alleging government loyalty and procedural errors in the St Kitts and JMM cases. He was sacked on June 30, 1997, before completing his term, amid political pressures.

== Authorship and advocacy ==
Singh authored over 25 books, including Inside CBI, Make a Way Where There is None, 50 Days to Top, Some Untold Tales, and Without Fear and Favour. His book Corruption: A Threat to Indian Bureaucracy (2014) compiled articles on CBI’s operational challenges and governance issues, advocating for agency autonomy.

He wrote columns for national dailies, addressing corruption, terrorism, and police reforms, and delivered lectures, such as at Aryans Group of Colleges in 2016, sharing his experiences on integrity in public service.

== Death ==
He died on February 3, 2017, at the age of 77 after a prolonged illness, and was cremated in Delhi.
