= Bharatpol =

Crime monitoring portal

- Logo
- Established: January 7, 2025; 2 months ago
- Purpose: Crime monitoring and analysis
- Headquarters: New Delhi, India
- Parent organization: Central Bureau of Investigation
- Website: bharatpol.cbi.gov.in

Bharatpol is an Indian crime monitoring portal under the Central Bureau of Investigation (CBI), formed to exchange information quickly and enable the Indian law enforcement agencies to communicate with other international law enforcement agencies.

On January 7, 2025, the Indian Home Minister Amit Shah, officially launched the Bharatpol platform.

== Introduction ==
The Central Bureau of Investigation (CBI) coordinates international crime-related cooperation with a number of local agencies, including law enforcement authorities (LEAs), in its capacity as India's National Central Bureau for Interpol. Unit officers (UOs), such as superintendents and commissioners of police within respective jurisdictions, are contacted by Interpol liaison officers (ILOs) at the federal, state, and union territory (UT) levels to facilitate this coordination. In the past, letters, emails, and faxes were the primary means of contact between CBI, ILOs, and UOs; this slows down response times. Bharatpol is expected to streamline the process of processing requests for international assistance via Interpol.

The emergence of transnational crimes, including organized crime, illegal drug trade, human trafficking, financial crimes, cybercrime, online youth radicalization, and terrorism necessitates prompt international cooperation in criminal investigations. The Bharatpol portal will help bring all pertinent stakeholders together on one platform in order to meet this need. A useful tool for police officers, increasing their efficiency in addressing security and criminal issues. According to the Ministry of Home Affairs (MHA), it will facilitate quicker access to foreign assistance, strengthening India's fight against transnational crimes.

Investigators will have instant access to the records of all wanted criminals on Bharatpol. By facilitating faster access to overseas assistance, officials anticipate that the portal will significantly enhance police officers' effectiveness in combating crimes and security concerns.

Prior to Bharatpol, the CBI was largely in charge of handling requests for international assistance; now, all Indian law enforcement agencies will have this capacity. It is providing access to a consolidated platform for handling requests for international assistance through Interpol for all pertinent parties. Increasing the amount of notices published through Interpol and decreasing delays are the goals of the project, which is overseen by the CBI. Through Interpol's coordination, 100 wanted convicts have been repatriated to India since 2021, including 26 in 2024.

== History of Interpol in India ==
The International Criminal Police Organization (Interpol) has had a long history of collaboration with Indian law enforcement agencies. India has been a member of Interpol since 1949, shortly after gaining its independence, and has played an integral role in the organization's global fight against transnational crime, terrorism, and cybercrime.

=== Early membership (1949–1970s) ===
India joined Interpol on June 4, 1949, to enhance its cooperation in global criminal justice and law enforcement. This membership allowed India to connect with an international network dedicated to fighting crime.

The Central Bureau of Investigation (CBI) was appointed as India's National Central Bureau (NCB), serving as the main bridge between Interpol and Indian authorities.

Initially, Interpol's work in India concentrated on serious issues such as organized crime, human trafficking, and smuggling, with India's strategic location between Asia and the Middle East playing a crucial role.

=== Cold War era (1970s–1990s) ===
During the Cold War, India's National Central Bureau (NCB) adjusted its focus to address new global crime challenges. India collaborated with Interpol to combat the smuggling of drugs, particularly from Afghanistan and Southeast Asia. India worked with Interpol to extradite criminals linked to serious crimes, including economic offenses and terrorism. A significant case was the 1993 Mumbai bomb blasts, where Interpol's Red Corner Notices (RCNs) were used to pursue suspects like Dawood Ibrahim.

=== Post-Liberalization era (1990s–2010s) ===
After India liberalized its economy, there were major changes in various sectors, including technology and international security challenges. India increased its focus on issues like cybercrime and financial fraud, driven by the rise in online scams, phishing, and hacking. This required improved cooperation with Interpol to tackle these crimes effectively. Following the 2008 Mumbai attacks, India began to depend more on Interpol for sharing intelligence and tracking global terrorist networks. Issuing Red Notices for wanted suspects and working closely with countries like the U.S. and U.K. became common practice. Interpol assisted in training Indian law enforcement agencies in important areas such as forensics, cybercrime investigations, and data analysis, enhancing their capabilities to respond to these emerging threats.

=== From Interpol to Bharatpol ===
The Bharatpol platform launched in January 2025 will help the Indian law enforcement authorities to streamline communication with Interpol. Real-time and secure transmission of Interpol notices, including the sending of Red Corner Notices (RCNs) and other alerts over a worldwide network, will be responded to by Bharatpol more quickly both domestically and internationally. The Interpol references from 195 countries will be integrated for global assistance. Local agencies would be able to access the international support requests instantly. The platform will help in capacity-building and, document management and interchange. It will have access to 19 different kinds of Interpol databases. The CBI Systems Division is in charge of developing and maintaining the portal.

== See also ==
- Cybercrime
- Europol, a similar EU-wide organization.
- Intelligence assessment
- International Criminal Court
- Interpol notice
- Interpol Terrorism Watch List
- Interpol Travel Document
- InterPortPolice
- Operation Identify Me
- UN Police
