= F. V. Arul =

Director of the Central Bureau of Investigation
- In office 31 May 1968 – 6 May 1971
- Preceded by: D. P. Kohli
- Succeeded by: D. Sen

Personal details
- Born: Frederick Victor Arul; 24 November 1917 Vazhayadi, Nazareth
- Died: 15 June 2006 (aged 88) Chennai, India
- Spouse: Mabel
- Children: Michael
- Education: Loyola College
- Occupation: former director of Central Bureau of Investigation

Frederick Victor Arul (1917-2006) was a high-ranking Indian police officer and former director of Central Bureau of Investigation from Yangon. He was born in Nazareth, thoothukudi district

== Early life and education ==
Arul was born on 24 November 1917 in Vazhayadi, Nazareth . He was educated at Loyola College and Madras Christian College in Chennai.

== Tamil Nadu police ==
He began his career in 1938 in the Andhra region of erstwhile Madras State. He served as a DSP, SDPO, Addl.SP and Senior Superintendent in the districts of West Godavari, Kadapa district, Tiruchirappalli district and Prakasam district. He also commanded several Armed Police battalions. He served as Deputy Inspector-General of Police in the then Tamil Nadu Criminal Investigation Department (CID), DIG of Madurai Range, and then the IG of Tamil Nadu . He also served as the Police Commissioner of Madras City for two terms, the first being from 1956 to 1959.

== Central Bureau of Investigation ==
He served as the Director of the Central Bureau of Investigation from 31 May 1968 to 6 May 1971. He also became the first Indian to become the Vice-President of Interpol during his time in CBI serving in the Executive Committee of the Interpol as Vice-President for Asia in the 1970s.
