= Praveen Sood =

Director of Central Bureau of Investigation

Praveen Sood IPS
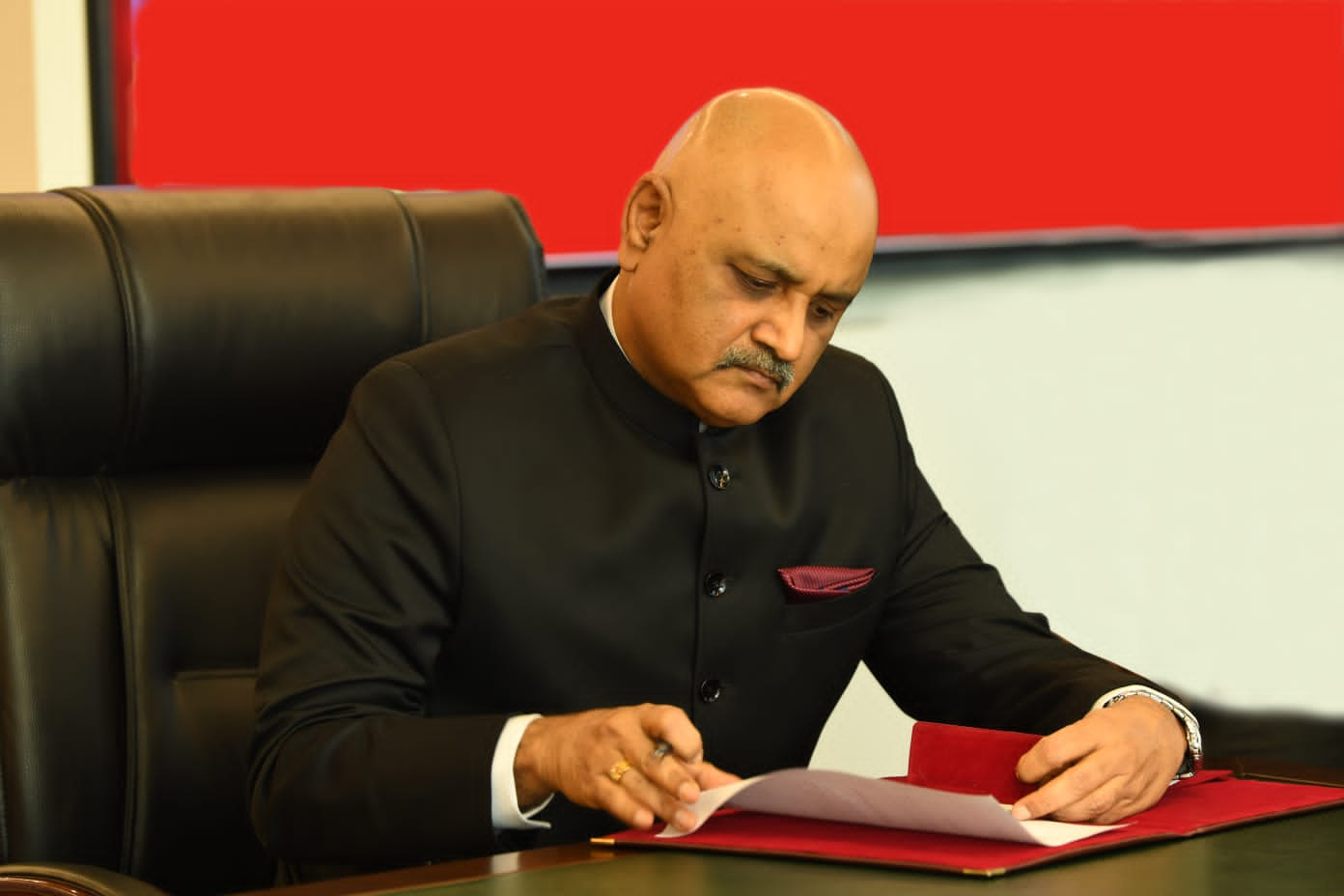
- Praveen Sood in 2023

Director of the Central Bureau of Investigation
- Incumbent
- Assumed office 25 May 2023
- Preceded by: Subodh Kumar Jaiswal

Director General and Inspector General of Police, Karnataka State Police
- In office 31 January 2020 – 19 May 2023
- Preceded by: Neelamani N. Raju IPS
- Succeeded by: Alok Mohan IPS

Personal details
- Born: 22 May 1964 (age 62) Kasauli, Himachal Pradesh, India
- Education: IIT Delhi; IIM Bangalore; Syracuse University
- Occupation: IPS officer

Praveen Sood (born 22 May 1964) is an Indian Police Service officer of 1986 batch from Karnataka cadre who serves as Director of the Central Bureau of Investigation in India. He previously served as the Chief of the Karnataka State Police, Police Commissioner of Bangalore and Police Commissioner of Mysuru. He is the father-in-law of Indian Cricketer Mayank Agarwal.

== Early life and background ==
Sood hails from Himachal Pradesh. He is a 1986-batch Indian Police Service officer. He attended the Indian Institute of Technology, Delhi where he graduated with a degree in Civil Engineering. In 2003, he attended the Indian Institute of Management, Bangalore and the Maxwell School of Citizenship and Public Affairs at Syracuse University in New York.

== Career ==
Sood started his career from Mysore in Karnataka, his first posting as an IPS officer in 1989, as the Assistant Superintendent of Police. He served as Superintendent of Police of Bellary and of Raichur. In 1999, he was appointed Police Advisor to the Government of Mauritius

Later, from 2004 to 2007, Sood served as the Police Commissioner of Mysore. He became the Additional Commissioner of Police (Traffic) in Bengaluru in 2008 and served till 2011. In 2013, as Managing Director of the Karnataka State Police Housing Corporation, he was known to improving the turnover of KSPHC.

Sood also served as the Principal Secretary (Home). He subsequently served as the Additional Director General of Police, Karnataka State Reserve Police and then as Additional Director General of Police, Administration. In 2017, he was appointed Commissioner of the Bangalore City Police.

Promoted to the rank of Director General of Police, he served as DGP (Internal Security) and DGP (CID). In 2020, Sood took over as the Director General and Inspector General of the Karnataka Police, a position which he served till his appointment as the CBI director in 2023.

Sood was due to retire in May 2025 after 2 years of service as CBI director but was granted an extension of 1 year in May of that year. Sood visited Hyderabad in September 2025 and was soon hospitalised after a trip to the temple town of Srisailam. His condition was reported to be stable. He was given another one year extension as CBI director on 13 May 2026.

== Awards ==
Sood received the following awards:

- The Chief Minister’s Gold Medal for excellence in service in 1996.
- Police Medal for Meritorious Service in 2002.
- President’s Police Medal for Distinguished Service in 2011.
- The Prince Michael International Road Safety Award in 2006.

Police appointments
Preceded by N. S. Megharikh	Commissioner of the Bangalore City Police; 2017 - 2017	Succeeded by T. Suneel Kumar
Preceded by Subodh Kumar Jaiswal	Director of the Central Bureau of Investigation; 2023 - Present	Incumbent
