= Mannem Nageswara Rao =

Indian police officer; interim director of the CBI from 2018 to 2019

Former-Director (Interim) of CBI
- In office 24 October 2018 – 4 February 2019
- Preceded by: Alok Verma
- Succeeded by: Rishi Kumar Shukla
- In office 24 October 2018 – 8 January 2019
- Preceded by: Alok Verma
- Succeeded by: Alok Verma
- Born: 6 July 1960 (age 65),Telangana
- Police career
- Country: India
- Allegiance: India Police Service
- Batch: 1986

Mannem Nageswara Rao (born 6 July 1960)is a former-interim Director officer Central Bureau of Investigation (CBI) from 24 October 2018 till 4 February 2019. He joined CBI in 2016 and is a retired Indian Police Service (IPS) officer of 1986 batch and Odisha cadre. He served as Joint Director before being appointed as the Interim Director of CBI for 103 days.

Rao is from Mangapet village of Warangal district in Telangana State. He is a chemistry post graduate from Osmania University, did his research in Madras IIT, before joining the IPS in 1986. His maternal uncle is Dhulipala Sambasiva Rao of Guntur. He is married to Guntur's Chinna Vishnu Narayana's daughter.

Rao is also noted for his activities related to Hindu cultural assertion.
