= Leader of the Opposition in Lok Sabha =

Caucus head of the opposition party in the lower house of Indian parliament

Leader of the Opposition of Lok Sabha
- Lok Sabhā ke Vipakṣa ke Netā
- Lok Sabha (House of the People)

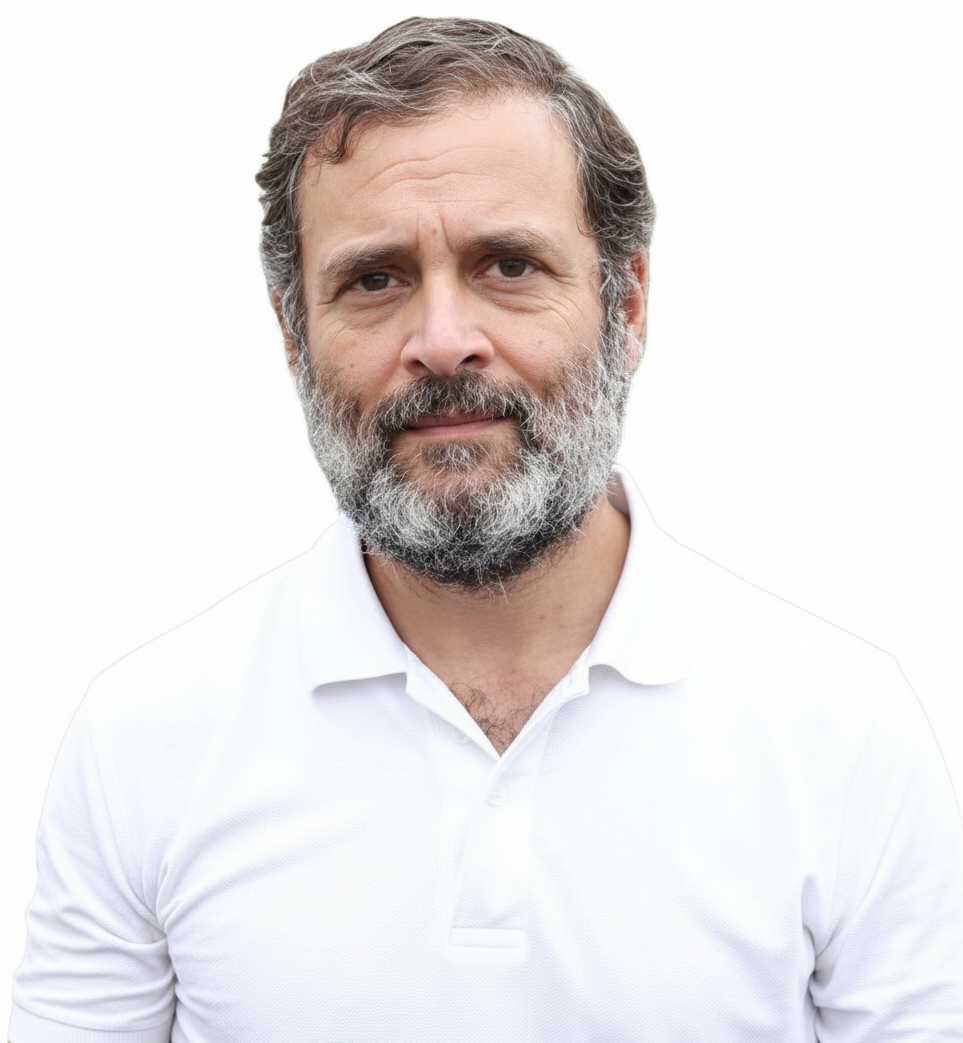
- Incumbent; Rahul Gandhi since 9 June 2024
- Style: The Honourable
- Type: Leader of the Opposition
- Status: Parliamentary Chairman of the Opposition Party
- Abbreviation: LoP
- Reports to: Parliament of India
- Residence: 10, Janpath, New Delhi
- Seat: Sansad Bhavan, New Delhi
- Nominator: MPs of the Official Opposition in the House of the People
- Appointer: Speaker of the Lok Sabha
- Term length: 5 years unless dissolved sooner (No term limits specified)
- Inaugural holder: Ram Subhag Singh (1969)
- Formation: 1969
- Deputy: Deputy Leader of Opposition
- Salary: ₹330,000 (US$3,400) (excl. allowances) per month
- Website: sansad.in/ls

The Leader of the Opposition in Lok Sabha (IAST: Lok Sabhā ke Vipakṣa ke Netā) is an elected Member of Lok Sabha who leads the official opposition in the Lower House of the Parliament of India. The leader of the opposition is the parliamentary chairperson of the largest political party in the Lok Sabha that is not in government (provided that said political party has at least 10% of the seats in the Lok Sabha). Rahul Gandhi is currently serving as the leader of the opposition in the Lok Sabha.

The office holder ranks 7th in the Order of Precedence of India.

== History ==
In the Lok Sabha until 1969, there was a de facto opposition leader with no formal recognition, status or privilege. Later, the leader of the opposition was given official recognition, and their salary and allowances were extended by the Act of 1977. Since then, the leader in the Lok Sabha should satisfy three conditions, namely,

1. They should be a member of the House
2. of the party in opposition to the Government having the greatest numerical strength and
3. be recognized by the Speaker of the Lok Sabha

In December 1969, the Congress Party (O) was recognized as the main opposition party in the parliament while its leader, Ram Subhag Singh played the role of the opposition leader.

== Roles and responsibilities ==
A Leader of the Opposition in Lok Sabha has the following responsibilities.

- Status equivalent to Cabinet minister rank
- Member of selection committees
  - Director of the Central Bureau of Investigation
  - Chief Election Commissioner
  - Election Commissioners
  - Enforcement Director
  - National Human Rights Commissioner
  - Lokpal Chairperson
  - Audit and Expenditure committee of Government expenditure

However, in the selection panels for most of these appointments, except the CBI, where the Chief Justice of India is a member of this three-member committee that includes the Prime Minister, the Leader of the Opposition, and the Chief Justice of India, the government holds a numerical advantage, i.e votes are in the government's favour. However, the Leader of the Opposition will still have a say.

== Privileges and salary ==
The leader of opposition is a statutory post and officially recognized in “The Salary and Allowances of Leaders of Opposition in Parliament Act, 1977”.

== List of leaders of the opposition in Lok Sabha ==
The Lok Sabha did not officially recognize a leader of the opposition until 1969. The position was vacant between 1970 and 1977, between 1980 and 1989 and between 2014 and 2024. Rahul Gandhi of the Congress party has been recognised leader of the opposition in India's parliament, filling a post that had been empty for a decade.

Vacant

No.	Portrait	Name	Constituency	Tenure			Lok Sabha	Prime Minister	Party
1		Ram Subhag Singh	Buxar	17 December 1969	27 December 1970	1 year, 10 days	4th	Indira Gandhi	Indian National Congress (O)
–	–	Vacant	–	28 December 1970	30 June 1977	6 years, 185 days	5th	Indira Gandhi	No official opposition
2		Yashwantrao Chavan	Satara	23 March 1977	12 April 1978	1 year, 18 days	6th	Morarji Desai	Indian National Congress (R)
3		C. M. Stephen	Idukki	12 April 1978	10 July 1979	1 year, 89 days	6th	Morarji Desai	Indian National Congress (R)
(2)		Yashwantrao Chavan	Satara	10 July 1979	28 July 1979	18 days	6th	Morarji Desai	Indian National Congress (R)
4		Jagjivan Ram	Sasaram	29 July 1979	22 August 1979	24 days	6th	Charan Singh	Janata Party
–	–	Vacant	–	23 August 1979	31 December 1984	10 years, 117 days	7th	Indira Gandhi	No official opposition
–	–	Vacant	–	1 January 1985	17 December 1989	10 years, 117 days	8th	Rajiv Gandhi	No official opposition
5		Rajiv Gandhi	Amethi	18 December 1989	24 December 1990	1 year, 6 days	9th	VP Singh	Indian National Congress (I)
6		L. K. Advani	New Delhi	24 December 1990	13 March 1991	2 years, 213 days	9th	Chandra Shekhar	Bharatiya Janata Party
6		L. K. Advani	Gandhinagar	21 June 1991	25 July 1993	2 years, 213 days	10th	P. V. Narasimha Rao	Bharatiya Janata Party
7		Atal Bihari Vajpayee	Lucknow	26 July 1993	10 May 1996	2 years, 289 days	10th	P. V. Narasimha Rao	Bharatiya Janata Party
8		P. V. Narasimha Rao	Berhampur	16 May 1996	31 May 1996	15 days	11th	Atal Bihari Vajpayee	Indian National Congress
(7)		Atal Bihari Vajpayee	Lucknow	1 June 1996	4 December 1997	1 year, 186 days	11th	Deve Gowda; IK Gujral	Bharatiya Janata Party
9		Sharad Pawar	Baramati	05 December 1997	26 April 1999	1 year, 38 days	12th	Atal Bihari Vajpayee	Indian National Congress
10		Sonia Gandhi	Amethi	13 October 1999	6 February 2004	4 years, 116 days	13th	Atal Bihari Vajpayee	Indian National Congress
(6)		L. K. Advani	Gandhinagar	22 May 2004	21 December 2009	5 years, 213 days	14th	Manmohan Singh	Bharatiya Janata Party
11		Sushma Swaraj	Vidisha	21 December 2009	18 May 2014	4 years, 148 days	15th	Manmohan Singh	Bharatiya Janata Party
–	–	Vacant	–	20 May 2014	29 May 2019	10 years, 19 days	16th	Narendra Modi	No official opposition
–	–	Vacant	–	30 May 2019	8 June 2024	10 years, 19 days	17th	Narendra Modi	No official opposition
12		Rahul Gandhi	Rae Bareli	9 June 2024	Incumbent	2 years, 90 days	18th	Narendra Modi	Indian National Congress

== Statistics ==
=== List of leaders of the opposition by length of term ===
Fraction of time of holding LoP by party (as of December 2025)
1. Bharatiya Janata Party (16 years 321 days) (21.4%)
2. Indian National Congress (10 years, 271 days) (15.0%)
3. Indian National Congress (Organisation) (1 year 10 days) (1.29%)
4. Janata Party (25 days) (0.08%)
5. Vacant (34.0%)
6. Not Recognised (28.3%)

No.	Name	Party	Length of term	
No.	Name	Party	Longest continuous term	Total years of opposition-ship
1	Lal Krishna Advani	BJP	5 years, 213 days	8 years, 62 days
2	Sushma Swaraj	BJP	4 years, 148 days	4 years, 148 days
3	Atal Bihari Vajpayee	BJP	2 years, 289 days	4 years, 110 days
4	Sonia Gandhi	INC	4 years, 116 days	4 years, 116 days
5	Rahul Gandhi	INC	2 years, 90 days	2 years, 90 days
6	C. M. Stephen	INC	1 year, 89 days	1 year, 89 days
7	Sharad Pawar	INC	1 year, 38 days	1 year, 38 days
8	Ram Subhag Singh	INC(O)	1 year, 10 days	1 year, 10 days
9	Rajiv Gandhi	INC	1 year, 6 days	1 year, 6 days
10	Yashwantrao Chavan	INC	1 year, 18 days	1 year, 36 days
11	Jagjivan Ram	JP	24 days	24 days
12	P. V. Narasimha Rao	INC	15 days	15 days
Vacant			10 years 117 days	26 years 321 days
Not Recognised			22 years 123 days	22 years 123 days

== See also ==
- Vice-President of India (Chairman of the Rajya Sabha)
- Speaker of the Lok Sabha
- Deputy Chairperson of the Rajya Sabha
- Leader of the Opposition in Rajya Sabha
- Leader of the House in Rajya Sabha
- Leader of the House in Lok Sabha
- Secretary General of the Lok Sabha
