= Karam Chand Jain =

Rai Sahib Karam Chand Jain
- Born: January 5, 1898; Rewari
- Died: October 12, 1967 (aged 69)
- Education: Law Honours from Lahore University
- Alma mater: Lahore University
- Occupation: Public Prosecutor
- Known for: First Legal advisor of Special Police Establishment (later turned into Central Bureau of Investigation)
- Awards: Title of Rai Sahib, nominated for title of Rai Bahadur

Rai Sahib Karam Chand Jain was the first Legal Advisor of the War & Supply Department of India and Special Police Establishment (SPE), which later developed into the Central Bureau of Investigation (CBI). He was also the Public Prosecutor of the Undivided Punjab (Before India-Pakistan partition) and a distinguished criminal lawyer in his later years of private practice.

== Biography ==
Jain was born in 1898 at Rewari (at the time a tehsil of Gurgaon in undivided Punjab). His father Shri Prabhu Dayal Jain (postgraduate) was the younger brother of Rai Bahadur Umrao Singh Jain, who was the first postgraduate in Punjab University and was the Inspector General of undivided Punjab for a long period.

Karam Chand Jain in 1932, aged 34

Jain had a college education both in St. Stephen’s College and Hindu College. He took his degree in 1918 and went to Lahore to pursue his studies in Law, since there were no facilities available in Delhi at that time. He completed his Law Honours Degree and stood second in the Lahore University. He practiced as a lawyer for a few years in Gurgaon and later on became the Public Prosecutor of undivided Punjab to be posted across various cities – like Sialkot, Lyalpur, Gujranwala and Gurdaspur.

He was the first legal advisor of the War & Supply Department based out of Lahore and was the first legal advisor of Special Police Establishment, which was transferred to the Home Department in 1946 under the leadership of Sardar Patel. He continued in his capacity as the Chief Legal Advisor till February 1951.

For his good performance, the British Government conferred him the title of Rai Sahib in 1945 and was nominated for the title of Rai Bahadur in 1947, but due to communal riots across the country, the list of nominees was never made public.

After quitting his position of Legal Advisor at Special Police Establishment, he set up his private practice as a criminal lawyer. He made a good name in this profession and was rated as one of the best criminal lawyers of his period. He was also the Group Legal advisor to the Dalmia Enterprises for more than a decade and half. He died on October 12, 1967.
