= Narender Singh Ahlawat =

Indian Army officer

Captain Narender Singh Ahlawat SC, SM
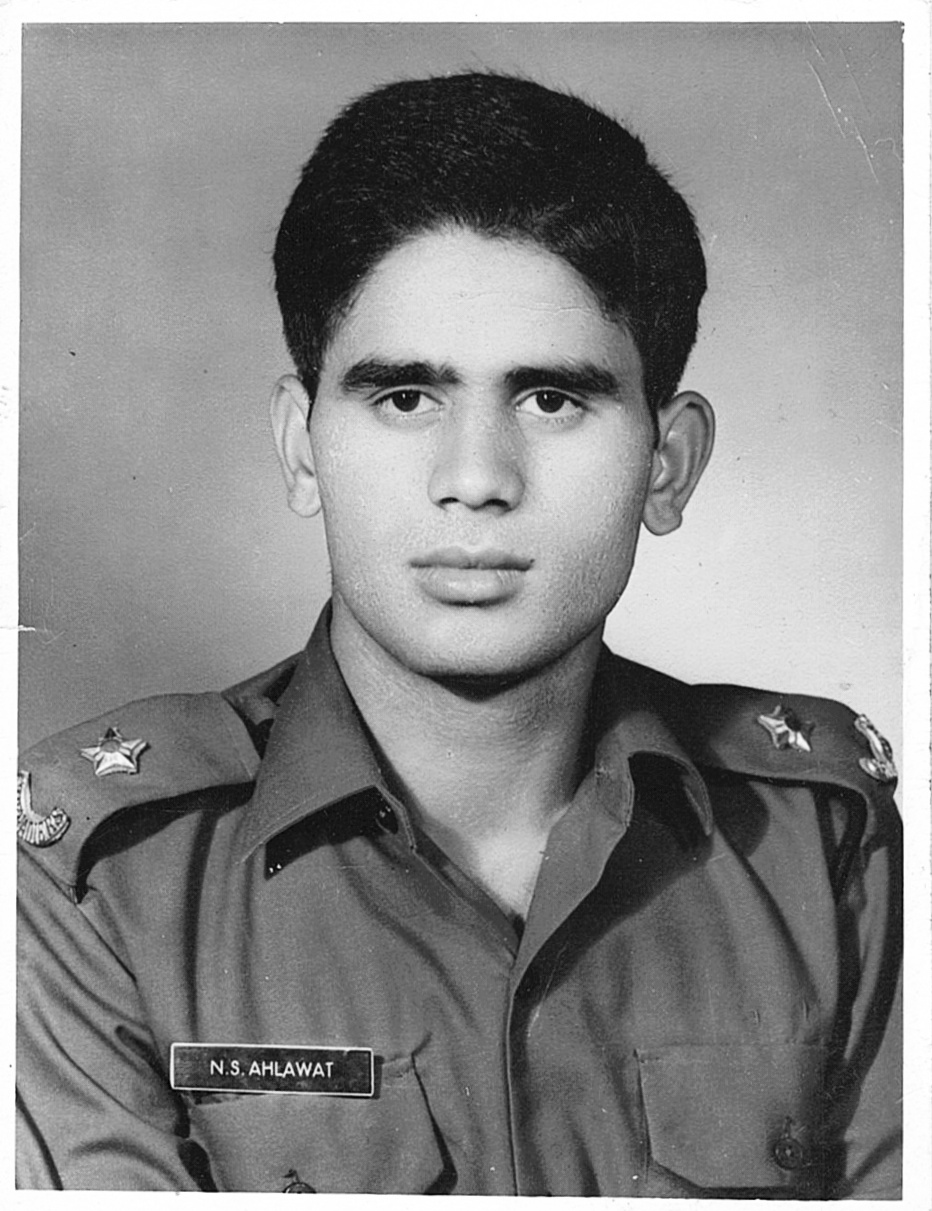
- Died: 28 November 1974; Dighal, Haryana, India
- Military career
- Allegiance: India
- Branch: Indian Army
- Rank: Captain
- Unit: 15 The Grenadiers
- Conflicts: Indo-Pakistani war of 1971; Naga Insurgency
- Awards: Shaurya Chakra; Sena Medal

Captain Narender Singh Ahlawat, SC, SM was an officer of the Indian Army. He was awarded the Sena Medal for his gallantry in the Battle of Shakargarh in the Indo-Pakistani War of 1971, posthumously awarded the Shaurya Chakra for his actions in counterinsurgency operations in Nagaland in 1974.

== Early life ==
Narender Singh was born in Dighal village of Jhajjar district in Haryana to Major Ran Singh and Nehali Devi. His grandfather, Chaudhary Sohan Singh Ahlawat, was well known in the village and fought with the British Indian Army in World War I. He had five brothers and two sisters. Two of his brothers, Lt. Colonel Ramphal and Colonel Mohinder Singh Ahlawat, served in the Indian army, and one, Nafe Singh Ahlawat, retired as a District and Sessions Judge, after serving in the Haryana judiciary. Another of his brothers, Ved Singh Ahlawat, served as the Deputy inspector general of police (DIG) in the Border Security Force, and his youngest brother, Sh Virender Singh, was an officer in the Delhi Police.

== Education ==
Narender first attended King George School, and later graduated from DAV College, Chandigarh.

== Military career ==
Following the tradition of the family, he joined the Indian army, and was commissioned into 15 The Grenadiers of the Indian Army as a second lieutenant. He rose to the rank of captain.

=== 1971 Indo-Pakistani War ===
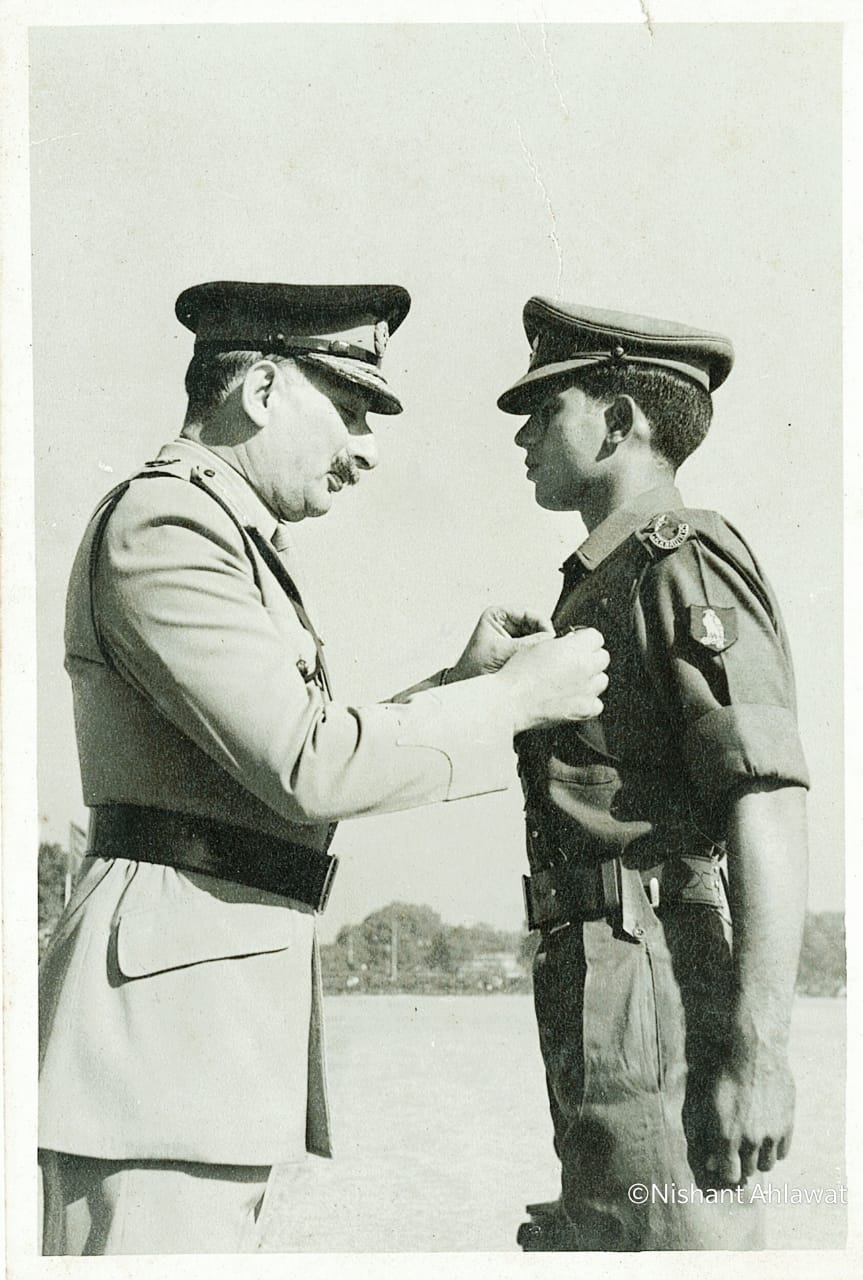
Capt N S Ahlawat being awarded Sena Medal by FM Manekshaw in 1972

Immediately after becoming commissioned as a second lieutenant, he was deployed in the Indo-Pakistani War of 1971 and showed highest level of gallantry in the Battle of Shakargarh. For his bravery in the war he was awarded Sena Medal by Field Marshal Sam Manekshaw.

His citation as published on 9 March 1974 in the official Gazette of India reads as under:

"83. Second Lieutenant NARENDER SINGH AHLAWAT (EC-25103)

The Grenadiers. On the Morning of 8 December 1971.

Second Lieutenant Singh Ahlawat was assigned the task of destroying a medium machine-gun bunker in the Shakargarh Sector. He led his patrol with courage and captured the enemy infantry and weapon crew. He had barely got into position when the enemy launched a counter attack with a squadron of armour to effect a break through. A fierce tank battle ensued and a number of enemy tanks were destroyed. Second Lieutenant Singh Ahlawat had knocked out three enemy tanks when his own tank was hit, wounding his gunner. Taking over the gun control, he continued to fight from his tank. A direct hit put his tank out of action and he himself was wounded, but undeterred he continued to fight till the enemy attack was repulsed.

=== 1974 Nagaland Counter Insurgency ===
His Citation reads as:

"8. Captain NARENDER SINGH AHLAWAT (IC 25103), SM GRENADIERS

(Posthumous)

(Effective date of the award-28th November, 1974)

On the 28th November, 1974, during an operation against hostiles Captain Narender Singh Ahlawat of an infantry regiment, was assigned the task of establishing two stops, while the main column was conducting a search. Captain Ahlawat accomplished the task and took charge of one of the stops while the other was being looked after by a Non Commissioned Officer. The Non Commissioned Officer saw some hostiles at a distance of 300 yards from his stop, and ordered his Light Machine Gun group to open fire. This took the hostiles by surprise, who ran in disarray. Some of them ran towards the stop of Captain Ahlawat who immediately lifted his stop to intercept the hostiles. Some of the hostiles rushed into the nullah. Captain Ahlawat came face to face with two hostiles whom he made to surrender. In the meantime, another hostile fired from the nullah at one of his stop members. The officer immediately engaged that hostile but in the meanwhile he got a burst in his chest. Though seriously wounded, he continued to engage that hostile and kept on instructing his stops to chase the other fleeing hostiles. He simultaneously apprised the searching column commander of the situation and then lay dead.

In this action, Captain Narender Singh Ahlawat, displayed gallantry, devotion to duty and leadership of a High Order."

He was posthumously awarded the Shaurya Chakra for his bravery.

== See also ==
- Insurgency in Northeast India
- Awards and decorations of the Indian Armed Forces
