= Parminder Singh Brar =

Indian politician, sports administrator and lawyer

General Secretary of Bharatiya Janata Party, Punjab
- Incumbent
- Assumed office 17 September 2023
- President: Sunil Kumar Jakhar

Personal details
- Born: 10 November 1983 (age 42)
- Party: Bharatiya Janata Party (December 2021-present)
- Other political affiliations: Indian National Congress (October 2021-December 2021); Shiromani Akali Dal (until October 2021)
- Children: 1
- Education: Panjab University (LLB, MBA)
- Occupation: Politician; sports administrator; lawyer

Parminder Singh Brar (10 November 1983) is an Indian politician, sports administrator and lawyer. Brar is a member of the Bharatiya Janata Party (BJP). He has been serving as General Secretary of BJP Punjab since 17 September 2023. Brar is noted for his involvement in youth politics in Punjab.

== Early life and education ==
Parminder Singh Brar was born on 10 November 1983. Brar is the grandson of politician Hari Singh Zira. He graduated with a Bachelor of Laws from the Department of Laws in Panjab University, Chandigarh, and has a Masters in Business Administration from Panjab University. Brar is enrolled as a solicitor in the Law Society of England and Wales, and in 2009, he attended a human rights program that was conducted by the American University, Washington College of Law.

== Political career ==
=== Early political career ===
Brar was initially a member of the Shiromani Akali Dal (SAD) and served in various positions in SAD. From 2016 to 2017, he was the Officer on Special Duty (OSD) to the then-deputy chief minister of Punjab, Sukhbir Singh Badal. He was also the head of SAD's information technology wing. During his time in SAD, Brar was particularly involved in youth politics. In 2018, he was appointed as the President of the Student Organisation of India, the student wing of SAD. He was also part of the Youth Akali Dal, SAD's youth wing, core committee that was first formed in 2016 and was also the head of the Youth Akali Dal. Brar was also given significant responsibilities in SAD's previous election campaigns before 2021.

However, in October 2021, Brar joined the Indian National Congress (INC) after SAD refused to give him a ticket to compete in the 2022 Punjab Legislative Assembly elections. The INC had mixed reactions to him joining the party, with some of the INC politicians commenting that the sole asset that Brar had was his proximity to senior SAD politician Bikram Singh Majithia.

=== Bharatiya Janata Party ===
In December 2021, Brar joined the Bharatiya Janata Party (BJP). In December 2022, he was appointed as secretary of BJP Punjab. On 17 September 2023, Brar was appointed as General Secretary of BJP Punjab. On 29 of September 2023, he was appointed as the president of BJP Punjab Yuva Morcha, the BJP Punjab's youth wing. Brar's appointment as General Secretary of BJP Punjab alienated BJP Punjab politicians Balbir Singh Sidhu and Gurpreet Singh Kangar, as they viewed Brar as being a junior politician and yet still being appointed to a senior position. Sidhu and Kangar rejoined the INC in October 2023, after having joined the BJP in 2022.

In March 2024, was made a member of the BJP Punjab State Election Committee, which was formed for the 2024 Indian General Election. In the run up to the 2024 Indian General Election, Brar criticized the Aam Aadami Party (AAP) for failing to find suitable candidates for the parliament seats from Punjab, alleging that the party had to resort to nominating corrupt leaders. He also claimed that farmers were satisfied with the BJP Central Government's betterment efforts, and emphasized that polling booth-level workers focus on door-to-door campaigns in the Fatehgarh Sahib Lok Sabha constituency to promote the BJP government's policies. In April 2024, Brar was part of the joining ceremony that welcomed several senior Punjab politicians to the BJP. In July 2024, the Punjab BJP office in Chandigarh received three threat letters containing a suspicious powdered substance. The letters, allegedly from the militant Khalistan Zindabad Force, targeted leaders Brar, Manjinder Singh Sirsa, and Tejinder Singh Sran, demanding they disassociate from the BJP. The incident was reported to the police, and the substance was sent for forensic examination.

In June 2025, Brar was part of the induction ceremony that welcomed Jaspreet Singh Hobby, a former senior vice president of the SAD, into the BJP.

== Sports administration ==
Brar served as the Vice President of the Punjab Rifle Shooting Association (PRSA) from at least 2015 to 2017. He is serving as the Senior Vice President of the PRSA since 2017.

== Personal life ==
Brar is married and has one child.
