= Radhe Mohan =

Medical physicist

- Born: August 12, 1941 (age 85); Lahore, British India
- Citizenship: United States
- Education: Punjab University, Chandigarh, B.S., M.S. Duke University, PhD, Physics.
- Awards: AAPM Edith H. Quimby Award (2003); Allan M. Cormack Gold Medal (2004); Failla Memorial Award of the Radiological and Medical Physics Society of New York (2010); ASTRO Gold Medal (2013); AAPM Coolidge Gold Medal (2018)
- Scientific career
- Fields: Medical Physics
- Workplaces: University of Texas M. D. Anderson Cancer Center

Radhe Mohan is a medical physicist who significantly advanced radiation treatment safety for oncology patients. He is a recipient of the ASTRO Gold Medal for outstanding contributions in the field of radiation oncology.

== Career ==
During the 1970s, Mohan developed computer-aided systems for automated dosimetry and record-and-verify systems. Subsequently, in the 1980s and 1990s, he was a leader in researching newer methods of radiation treatments such as 3-D conformal radiation therapy, intensity modulation radiation therapy, and in the 2000s, proton therapy. His research activities include intensity-modulated radiotherapy, Monte Carlo techniques and image-guided radiotherapy. Dr. Mohan is the author or co-author of over 600 papers, book chapters and publications in proceedings of conferences. He has been the principal investigator, co-PI or co-investigator on numerous grants from the National Cancer Institute and research projects sponsored by industry.

Mohan was the chairman of the Department of Radiation Physics at The University of Texas MD Anderson Cancer Center and is currently a principal investigator at MD Anderson researching the optimization of proton therapy.

In 1983, Mohan was part of the team at the computer services department of Memorial Sloan Kettering Cancer Center which helped the F.B.I. track down one of the earliest groups of computer hackers, The 414s.

== Education ==
In 1969, Mohan received his PhD in physics from Duke University. Prior to that he received BS and MS degrees in physics from Punjab University. Mohan was a 1965 recipient of a Fulbright Fellowship.

== Awards and recognition ==
In addition to the ASTRO award, Mohan has received the AAPM Award for Lifetime Achievement in Medical Physics (2003), the Cormack Gold Medal from the Association of Medical Physicists in India (2004), and the Failla Award from the Radiological and Medical Physics Society of New York (2009).
