= Amit Rawal =

Indian jurist

Justice (Retd.) Amit Rawal
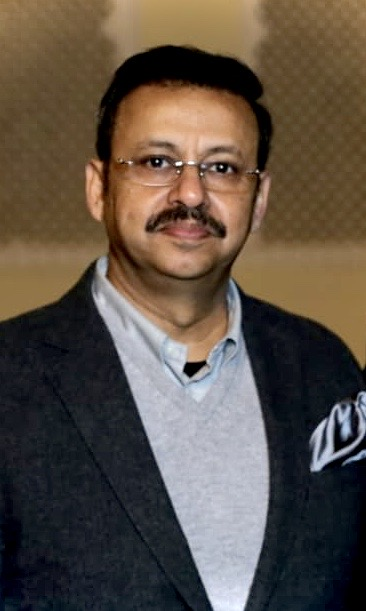

Judge of Kerala High Court
- In office 12 November 2019 – 20 September 2025
- Nominated by: Ranjan Gogoi
- Appointed by: Ram Nath Kovind

Judge of Punjab and Haryana High Court
- In office 25 September 2014 – 11 November 2019
- Nominated by: Rajendra Mal Lodha
- Appointed by: Pranab Mukherjee

Personal details
- Born: 21 September 1963 (age 63) Chandigarh
- Citizenship: Indian
- Education: Panjab University
- Website: High Court of Kerala

Amit Rawal (born 21 September 1963) is an Indian judge, who is a former judge of Kerala High Court, the highest court in the Indian state of Kerala and in the Union Territory of Lakshadweep, which is headquartered at Ernakulam, Kochi.

== Early life and career ==
Rawal graduated from DAV College, Chandigarh in 1983, and received a law degree from Panjab University, Chandigarh, in 1986 and was enrolled as member of Bar Council of Punjab and Haryana. He represented the Bar Council of Punjab and Haryana in the High Court and other institutions. He was designated as Senior Advocate on 8 May 2012. After a short stint in the office of Advocate General, Punjab as Additional Advocate General, he was elevated as an additional judge of the Punjab and Haryana High Court on 25 September 2014 and was appointed permanent judge of that court on 23 May 2016.
