= InterPortPolice =

International organization of law enforcement agencies

The InterPortPolice (also INTERPORTPOLICE) is an international organization of law enforcement agencies established to combat serious transnational crimes, such as terrorism and drug smuggling, that affect various transportation hubs, such as seaports and airports. It involves airport, seaport, transport and border police forces.

The organization was established in 1969, initially under the name International Organization of Port Authority Police. In 1974 airport authorities were included into the organization, and its name was changed accordingly to the International Association of Airport and Seaport Police (IAASP). In 2010 its charter was expanded again, to include transport and border authorities. This time, rather than expand the name, it was decided to use the name INTERPORTPOLICE to represent the international association of airport, seaport, and transport law enforcement.

== History ==
The InterPortPolice is an international organization of law enforcement, which focuses on critical infrastructure for airport and seaport authorities. Development of the organisation began in 1968 by police departments from Canada, Netherlands, United Kingdom, and the United States to address transnational crime. The organization's original name was International Organization of Port Authority Police. The first meeting was held in 1970 at the Massachusetts Port Authority. Four years later the group added airport authorities and changed their name to International Association of Airport and Seaport Police (IAASP). In 2010, the focus was broadened by including a holistic approach of all authorities within the security boundary to include border and large event requirements. At that time the name InterPortPolice was adopted to stand for International Organization of Airport and Seaport Police.

== Fred V. Morrone ==
The executive vice president of the organization, Fred V. Morrone, died in the September 11 attacks. A year after the attacks, InterPortPolice and Morrone's family created the Morrone Education Program to educate officers and help aid in the fight against terrorism.
