= DAV College, Chandigarh =

College in Chandigarh, India

Dayanand Anglo-Vedic College, Chandigarh
- Motto: Keep Marching On
- Established: 1958; 68 years ago
- Affiliations: Panjab University
- President: Punam Suri
- Principal: Mona Narang
- Location: Sector 10, Chandigarh, India; 30.752231°N 76.785561°E
- Campus: Urban
- Website: davchd.ac.in
- Location within Chandigarh

DAV College is a co-educational degree college in Sector 10, Chandigarh, India. It was established in 1958 and is affiliated to the Panjab University, Chandigarh. The college is awarded 'A' Grade by NAAC. It is managed by the D.A.V. College Managing Committee.

The college various faculties - Arts, Science, Commerce, Diploma in Management, etc. - that offers several courses at undergraduate and postgraduate level.

== History ==
The college was founded in 1958, when the city of Chandigarh was in its infancy. The college belongs to the family of DAV institutions, founded by Mahatma Hansraj.

== Accreditation ==
The college has been awarded 'A' Grade by NAAC. It is ranked - Commerce 45, BCA 21, Arts 35 and Science 33, as per a survey by India Today, June 2020.

The National Institute of Educational Planning and Administration (NIEPA) has declared the college a "Model College". It has launched postgraduate programmes in IT, Commerce, English, Bioinformatics, Biotechnology, Chemistry, Maths, Zoology, Psychology, Public Administration, Sociology, Business economics; and postgraduate diplomas.

== Notable alumni ==
- Vikram Batra
- Rajiv Pratap Rudy
- Kaiku Rajkumar
- Ayushmann Khurrana
- Rochak Kohli
- Amit Rawal
- Narender Singh Ahlawat
- Lawrence Bishnoi
- Kapil Dev
- Yuvraj Singh
- Yograj Singh
- Wamiqa Gabbi
- Dinesh Mongia
- Neeraj Chopra
- Anjum Moudgil
- Jeev Milkha Singh
- Manu Bhaker

== See also ==
- Arya Samaj
