= Amitoj =

Punjabi poet

- ਅਮਿਤੋਜ
- Born: Krishan Kumar; 3 June 1947; Gurdaspur, Punjab, India
- Died: 28 August 2005 (aged 58); Jalandhar, Punjab, India
- Education: Panjab University, Chandigarh
- Occupation: Poet
- Spouse: Amritpal Kaur
- Children: 2
- Writing career
- Pen name: Kanwal Shamim; Krishan Kanwal Sareen

Amitoj (Punjabi: ਅਮਿਤੋਜ; born Krishan Kumar; 3 June 1947 – 28 August 2005) and later known as Kanwal Shamim and Krishan Kanwal Sareen, was an Indian poet, from the Punjab region.

== Early life ==
He was born in Akhara village, near Bholath, in the Gurdaspur district of the Punjab region in India. His parents name were Charan Das and Janaki Devi. He met poet Surjit Patar in 1962 while studying at Government College, Kapurthala. He studied at Evening College while working in life insurance and worked as a journalist in the newspaper Nawan Zamana for 18 months. Amitoj graduated with a Master of Arts and a PhD from Punjab University, Chandigarh.

== Career ==
Following his studies, Amitoj taught at Panjab University in the Department of Bhai Vir Singh Studies in Comparative Literature and later at the Department of Indian Theatre.

During the 1980s, he was also known for his literary style in the Jalandhar Doordarshan program "Kach Di Mundran". Amitoj's only book of poems, Khali Tarkash, was published in 1998 at the initiative of Surjit Patar, and many of his works are yet to be published.

During the Bangladesh Liberation War in 1971, Amitoj wrote a poem called Roshanara as a tribute to a Dhaka University student who was crushed by a Pakistani tank. This poem was released by UNI across the country and was widely appreciated. He wrote many beautiful poems like Lahore De Naam Khat, Buddha Bould, Khali Tarkash, and Greeting Card. The Punjabi version of Bertolt Brecht's play The Caucasian Chalk Circle, Parai Kukh, became very popular due to Amitoj's songs.

He died in the Civil Hospital in Jalandhar on 28 August 2005; and was cremated.

== Published works ==
- Khali Tarkash (in Punjabi). Ludhiana, Punjab: Opinion Makers. 1998. ISBN 978-9380906881 – via Amazon.com.
