= G. V. R. Prasad =

Indian paleontologist (born 1958)

- Born: 22 November 1958 (age 67); Sekuru, Guntur district, Andhra Pradesh, India
- Education: Vikram University; Panjab University; Montpellier 2 University; Pierre and Marie Curie University; Humboldt University of Berlin; University College of London
- Known for: Studies on the Mesozoic vertebrate groups of India
- Awards: 1994 MoMNational Mineral Award; 1999 UGC Research Award; 2003 S. S. Bhatnagar Prize; 2003 L. Rama Rao Birth Centenary Award; 2006SVP Preparators’ Grant Award
- Scientific career
- Fields: Paleontology; Palaeobiogeography
- Workplaces: Panjab University; University of Jammu; IISER Kolkata; University of Delhi
- Doctoral advisor: Ashok Sahni

Guntupalli Veera Raghavendra Prasad (born 1958) is an Indian paleontologist and former head of the department of geology at the University of Delhi. He is known for his studies on the Mesozoic vertebrate groups of India and is an elected fellow of all the three major Indian science academies viz. Indian Academy of Sciences, Indian National Science Academy and the National Academy of Sciences, India as well as The World Academy of Sciences. The Council of Scientific and Industrial Research, the apex agency of the Government of India for scientific research, awarded him the Shanti Swarup Bhatnagar Prize for Science and Technology, one of the highest Indian science awards for his contributions to Earth, Atmosphere, Ocean and Planetary Sciences in 2003. (Note: Long link - please select award year to see details)

== Biography ==
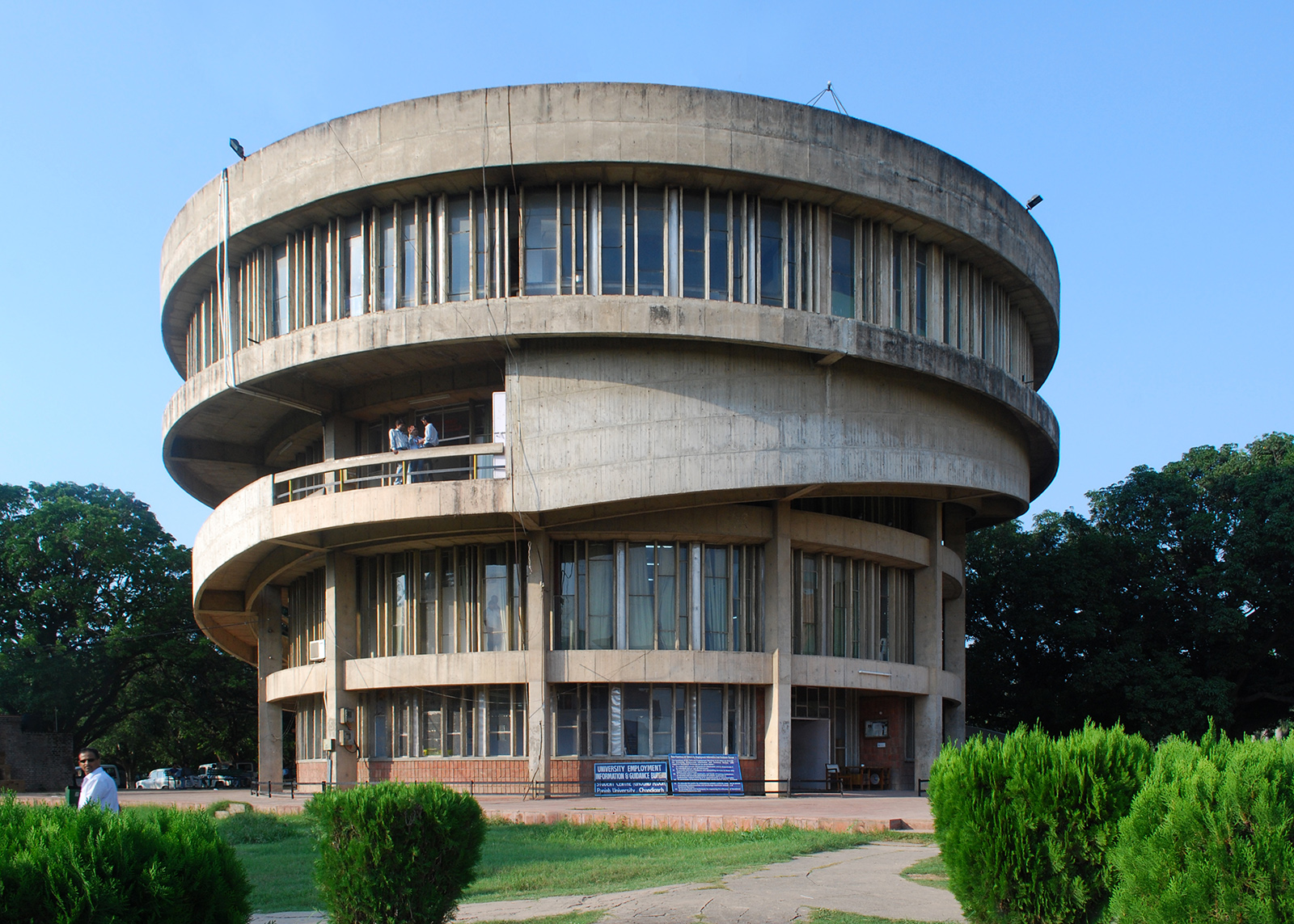
Student Centre, Panjab University

G. V. R. Prasad was born on 22 November 1958 in Sekuru, a small village in Guntur district of the south Indian state of Andhra Pradesh. He completed his undergraduate studies in 1979 at Vikram University and after obtaining a master's degree in 1981, enrolled for MPhil at Punjab University, Chandigarh. During this period, he did certificate and diploma courses in French at the university and continued there to secure his PhD working under the guidance of Ashok Sahni in 1986. His career started the same year at the Centre of Advanced Study in Palaeontology and Himalayan Geology of the university and served as an ad-hoc lecturer till 1986 when he moved to the department of geology of the University of Jammu as a lecturer. He served the university till 2008, holding positions as a reader (1992–98), a professor and in between, did his post doctoral studies at Montpellier 2 University, Pierre and Marie Curie University, Humboldt University of Berlin and University College of London. At Jammu University, he also held the responsibilities of the head of the department of geology (2002–03 and 2005–07), and the convener of the board of studies in geology (2006–08). His next move was to the University of Delhi as a professor and the head of department of geology and retired from the post in November 2023. He also served as a professor at the department of earth sciences of the Indian Institute of Science Education and Research, Kolkata.

== Legacy ==
Prasad's main areas of researches have been in the fields of Vertebrate paleontology and Cretaceous palaeobiogeography and he is known to have done extensive studies on various Mesozoic vertebrate groups of India, with regard to their origin, diversity, and biogeographic relationships. He is credited with the discovery of the first cretaceous mammal from India, eutherian mammals of arboreal adaptations and euarchontan affinities from the Cretaceous India and putative oldest ungulate mammal; the last of the discoveries is reported to evidence the Mesozoic origin of placental mammals. His studies have been documented in several peer-reviewed articles; (Note: Please see Selected bibliography section) ResearchGate, an online repository of scientific articles, has listed 101 of them. He is a former member of the Research Advisory Committee of Wadia Institute of Himalayan Geology, governing body of the Birbal Sahni Institute of Palaeosciences, the national working group of the International Union of Geological Sciences and the editorial board of the Journal of the Geological Society of India. He has also mentored a number of masters and doctoral scholars in their studies.

== Awards and honors ==
Prasad received the National Mineral Award of the Ministry of Mines in 1994 and the Research Award of the University Grants Commission in 1999. The Geological Society of India selected him for the L. Rama Rao Birth Centenary Award in 2003 and the Council of Scientific and Industrial Research awarded him the Shanti Swarup Bhatnagar Prize, one of the highest Indian science awards the same year. He was elected as a fellow by the Indian Academy of Sciences also in 2003 and he became a fellow of the Indian National Science Academy and the National Academy of Sciences, India in 2006. He was selected for the J. C. Bose National Fellowship of the Department of Science and Technology in 2015, the tenure of the fellowship running till 2015 during which period The World Academy of Sciences elected him as their fellow in 2011. He is also a recipient of Fields grant of the National Geographic Society (1993–95), Collections study grant of the American Museum of Natural History, Samuel P. & Doris Welles Fund grant of the University of California Museum of Paleontology and the Preparators’ Grant of the Society of Vertebrate Paleontology.

== Selected bibliography ==
- Varun Parmar; Rahul Magotra; Rigzin Norboo; Guntupalli Veera Raghavendra Prasad (2016). "Rodent-based age appraisal of the Lower Siwalik Subgroup of Kalaunta, Ramnagar, Jammu, India". Alcheringa: An Australasian Journal of Palaeontology. 41: 124–133. doi:10.1080/03115518.2016.1196435. S2CID 133491212.
- Thomas John Dixon Halliday; Guntupalli Veera Raghavendra Prasad; Anjali Goswami (2016). "Faunal similarity in Madagascan and South Indian Late Cretaceous vertebrate faunas" (PDF). Palaeogeography, Palaeoclimatology, Palaeoecology. 468: 70–75. doi:10.1016/j.palaeo.2016.11.046.
- Boyer, Doug M.; Prasad, Guntupalli V. R.; Krause, David W.; Godinot, Marc; Goswami, Anjali; Verma, Omkar; Flynn, John J. (2010). "New postcrania of Deccanolestes from the late Cretaceous of India and their bearing on the evolutionary and biogeographic history of Euarchontan mammals". Naturwissenschaften. 97 (4): 365–377. Bibcode:2010NW.....97..365B. doi:10.1007/s00114-010-0648-0. PMID 20130827. S2CID 12188926.
- Prasad, G. V. R. (2009). "Divergence time estimates of mammals from molecular clocks and fossils: relevance of new fossil finds from India". Journal of Biosciences. 34 (5): 649–659. doi:10.1007/s12038-009-0063-x. PMID 20009262. S2CID 10953376.
- Prasad, G. V. R.; Bajpai, Sunil (2008). "Agamid lizards from the early eocene of western India: oldest cenozoic lizards from south Asia". Palaeontologia Electronica. 11 (1): 1–20.

== See also ==
- Kanchan Pande
- Gideon Mantell
