= Subodh Kumar Jaiswal =

Director of Central Bureau Of Investigation, India

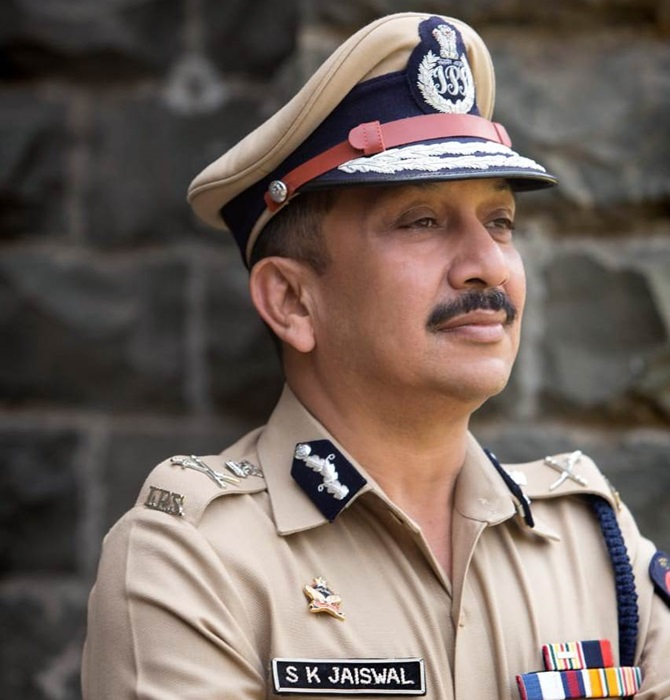
- Born: 22 September 1962 (age 64); Sindri, Bihar, India (now Jharkhand)
- Education: De Nobili School, FRI, B.A. (Hons) DAV College, Chandigarh; M.B.A. Panjab University
- Occupation: Police officer
- Organization: Central Bureau of Investigation
- Police career
- Service years: 1985– 25 May 2023
- Status: Former Director of CBI (25 May 2021- 25 May 2023)
- Rank: Director General of Police
- Awards: President's Police Medal for Distinguished Service, 2009

Subodh Kumar Jaiswal (born 22 September 1962) is an Indian police officer who served as the director of Central Bureau of Investigation (CBI). He is a 1985 batch Indian Police Service (IPS) officer and former Director General of Police, Maharashtra. He was previously the police commissioner of Mumbai, the largest city in India and the seventh most populous city in the world. Jaiswal was with the Research and Analysis Wing (R&AW), India's external intelligence agency for nine years, during which he served as the additional secretary of R&AW for three years. Jaiswal has also served in Intelligence Bureau and Maharashtra ATS Chief. He was the head of the Central Industrial Security Force. Jaiswal's career began in 1985 as a trainee officer in Aurangabad, where he was subsequently assigned the full posting as the Assistant Commissioner of Police.

== Experience ==
Mr. Jaiswal is a retired Indian Police Service officer borne on the strength of Maharashtra cadre. He began his journey in the Indian Police in 1985. In a career spanning 38 years, he had held critical appointments in organizations of the Government of India / Maharashtra State. These included leadership appointments as Commissioner of Police, Mumbai; Director General of Police, Maharashtra State; Director General, CISF and Director of the Central Bureau of Investigation (CBI). In his appointment as Director CBI, he was also the head of the National Central Bureau – INTERPOL India. His command responsibilities entailed managing large / specialized organizations having diverse functional responsibilities and cultural ethos.

Mr. Jaiswal has served on diplomatic assignments overseas and has represented the country in bilateral/Multilateral fora as leader and a member of delegations. He has acquired a deep understanding of international relations and has been known to effectively navigate complex challenges having national and international ramifications.

He has worked extensively in tribal areas of Maharashtra and has collaborated with community and civil society leaders for enhancing outreach of public welfare initiatives.

Mr. Jaiswal has been honored for his exceptional operational abilities, leadership qualities and crisis management skills which have been recognized by the Government of India / State Government. He is a recipient of the Asadharan Suraksha Seva Praman Patra (2020), Presidents Police Medal for Distinguished services (2009), Indian Police medal for Meritorious Services ( 2002 ) and Internal Security Medals from the Government of India and the State of Maharashtra.

Lately, he has remained engaged in speaking on various fora on subjects of Anti-corruption strategies, National Security and Information Technology. He is also a mentor with the Capacity Building Commission of India.

As per his colleagues, Subodh Jaiswal has expertise in Human resource management, Strategic management, Training, Project Management, Strong negotiation skills, Risk assessment, Change Management & Organizational Communication (External & Internal).

== Director General, CISF ==
As force Commander of 1.6 lakh strong paramilitary organization, Subodh Jaiswal oversaw security operations/protocol implementation and monitoring of critical national infrastructure including airports, nuclear installations, Space Establishments, Power Plants metros etc. As Director, his responsibilities entailed budgeting, resource allocation, personnel management, Intra agency coordination, risk assessment and implementation of International best practices in the security sector. He was also the advisor to the Ministry of Home Affairs on all issues relating to security and protection of critical infrastructure including development of policy advisories. During his tenure, CISF saw significant

== Director, Central Bureau of Investigation & Head, National Central Bureau of INTERPOL India ==
Subodh Jaiswal was the Director of Central Bureau of Investigation & Head of National Central Bureau of INTERPOL India from 25 May 2021 to 25 May 2023 (2 years). During his command role in the 60 year old Premier Investigation Agency of India, he directly supervised a 7000 strong work force tasked with investigating complex criminal cases and providing strategic direction to the agency. He supervised and guided 70 Indian Police Service Officers including 11 senior officers, who were part of the team in the CBI. He successfully led the organization in achieving a land mark 75% conviction rate of CBI cases in the 75th year of Indian Independence. Jaiswal also conceptualized and implemented first ever cadre review of the organization in 2022. This said significant improvement in recruitment, promotions, training and career development of personnel. While at CBI, he launched several land mark anti-corruption tactical operations, which were extremely useful for the organization. The INTERPOL General Assembly-2022 was conducted in New Delhi wherein 900 delegates from 166 countries participated, while Subodh Jaiswal was the director. He also successful conducted Young Global Police Leaders Programmed (YGPLP) of INTERPOL wherein 70 delegates from 48 countries/ seniors participated in a 9-day programmed. The Diamond Jubilee Celebrations 2023 was also conducted during his tenure which was presided over by the Indian Prime minister Narendra Modi.

== Director General, Maharashtra Police ==
As DGP Maharashtra Police, Subodh Jaiswal commanded largest State Police Force in the country with the strength of 2.16 lakhs. He also advised the state government on policy formulations and tactical implementation of regulatory counter measures to combat the year long covid pandemic. During his tenure he implementation effective social media outreach necessary to support police operations in maintenance of law and order, crime prevention and public safety. He initiated the Up-gradation of training institutions, methods, protocols and content to international standards in VVIP Security, Crime Investigation and maintenance of law and order. Counter insurgency operations effectively conducted in the state while Subodh Jaiswal was the DGP.

== AIG and DIG, Special Protection Group ==
Subodh Jaiswal was In charge, Close Protection Team of the Prime Minister of India. He developed new protocol guide lines for security drills and armoring of VVIP vehicles. He was the AIG and DIG, Special Protection Group for a period of 6.4 Years.
