= Central Bureau of Investigation =

Indian federal law enforcement agency

- Seal of CBI
- Abbreviation: CBI
- Motto: Industry, Impartiality, Integrity

Agency overview
- Formed: 1963 through Delhi Special Police Establishment Act, 1946
- Employees: Sanctioned: 7274; Actual: 6391; Vacant: 883 as on 1 Feb 2022
- Annual budget: ₹1,104.98 crore (US$118.0 million)(2026-27 est.)

Jurisdictional structure
- Operations jurisdiction: India
- Constituting instrument: The Delhi Special Police Establishment Act, 1946

Operational structure
- Headquarters: New Delhi, India
- Agency executive: Praveen Sood, IPS, Director
- Parent agency: Department of Personnel and Training

Website
- cbi.gov.in

The Central Bureau of Investigation (CBI) is the domestic crime investigating agency of India. It operates under the jurisdiction of the Ministry of Personnel, Public Grievances and Pensions. Originally set up to investigate bribery and governmental corruption, in 1965 it received expanded jurisdiction to investigate breaches of central laws enforceable by the Government of India, multi-state organised crime, multi-agency or international cases. CBI is exempted from the provisions of the Right to Information Act. CBI is India's officially designated single point of contact to act as the liaison with Interpol. The CBI headquarter is located in CGO Complex, near Jawaharlal Nehru Stadium in New Delhi.

== History ==
=== Special Police Establishment ===
The Bureau of Investigation traces its origins to the Special Police Establishment (SPE), a Central Government Police force, which was set up in 1941 by the Government of India to investigate bribery and corruption in transactions with the War and Supply Department of India. It had its headquarters in Lahore. The Superintendent of the SPE was Qurban Ali Khan, who later opted for Pakistan during the Partition of India. The first legal adviser of the War Department was Rai Sahib Karam Chand Jain. After the end of the war, there was a continued need for a central governmental agency to investigate bribery and corruption by central-government employees. Sahib Karam Chand Jain remained its legal advisor when the department was transferred to the Home Department by the 1946 Delhi Special Police Establishment Act.

== Organisation ==
The CBI is headed by a Director, an IPS officer with a rank of Director general of police. The current director of CBI is Praveen Sood, who was the former DG and IGP of Karnataka state police. The director is selected by a high-profile committee constituted under The Delhi Special Police Establishment (DSPE) Act, 1946 as amended through The Lokpal and Lokayuktas Act, 2013, and has a two-year term which can be extended for another three years.

The senior leadership is filled through deputation from the Indian Police Service cadre, such as at the levels of Additional Director, Joint Director, and Superintendent of Police, and also through deputation from various State Police Services at the ranks of Additional Superintendent of Police, Deputy Superintendent of Police, and Inspector. The CBI also has its own cadre officers, recruited directly at the rank of Sub-Inspector.

=== Unconstitutional status ===
Gauhati High Court had given a verdict on 6 November 2013 that CBI is unconstitutional and does not hold a legal status. However, the Supreme Court of India stayed this verdict when challenged by the central government and the next hearing on this is fixed on 6 December 2013. It continues to derive its powers from Delhi Special Police Establishment Act, 1946.

=== Demand for greater autonomy ===
Demanding independent investigations, the CBI said that although it deferred to the government's authority in non-corruption cases, the agency felt that sufficient financial and administrative powers were required by the director (including a minimum three-year tenure to ensure "functional autonomy"). "As such, it is necessary that the director, CBI, should be vested with ex-officio powers of the Secretary to the Government of India, reporting directly to the minister, without having to go through the DoPT", the agency said, adding that financial powers were not enough and it wanted a separate budget allocation.

=== Appointment Committee and Selection committee ===
The CBI Director is appointed, for not less than a term of two years, by the Appointment Committee on recommendation of Selection Committee as mentioned in DSPE Act 1946 amended through the Lokpal & Lokayukta Act 2013 and CVC Act, 2003 respectively. The Appointment Committee consists of:

- Prime Minister – Chairperson
- Leader of Opposition of Loksabha or the Leader of the single largest opposition party in the Lok Sabha, if the former is not present due to lack of mandated strength in the Lok Sabha - member
- Chief Justice of India or a Supreme Court Judge recommended by the Chief Justice – member

The Selection Committee constituted under Delhi Special Police Establishment Act 1946 nominates a certain number of names to the Appointment Committee, one among whom the Appointment Committee appoints as the CBI director. The Selection Committee consists of:

Central Vigilance Commissioner	Chairperson
Vigilance Commissioners	Members
Secretary to the Government of India in-charge of the Ministry of Home Affairs in the Central Government	Members
Secretary, Co-ordination and Public Grievances, Cabinet Secretariat	Member

The NDA government, on 25 November 2014, moved an amendment bill to do away with the requirement of quorum in high-profile committee while recommending the names for the post of director CBI to the central government by introducing the clause "no appointment of a (CBI) director shall be invalid merely by reason of any vacancy or absence of members in the panel" and to replace the Leader of the Opposition (LOP) with the leader of the single largest opposition party or pre-election coalition.

=== Infrastructure ===
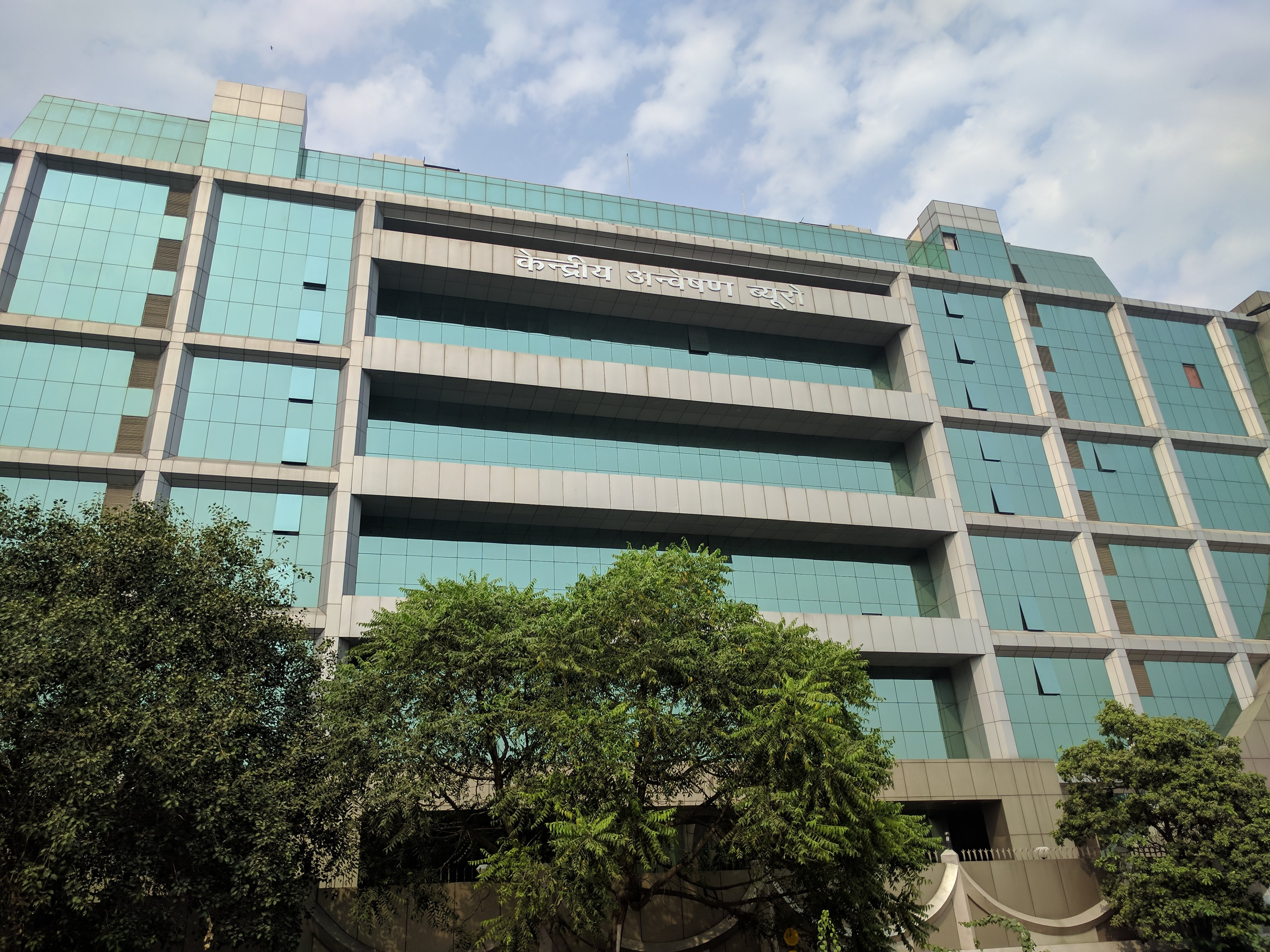
CBI headquarters in New Delhi

CBI headquarters is a ₹186 crore (US$20 million), 11-storey building in New Delhi. The 7,000-square-metre (75,000 sq ft) building is equipped with a modern communications system, an advanced record-maintenance system, storage space, computerised access control and an additional facility for new technology. Interrogation rooms, cells, dormitories and conference halls are provided. The building has a staff cafeteria with a capacity of 500, gyms, a terrace garden, and bi-level basement parking for 470 vehicles. Advanced fire-control and power-backup systems are provided, in addition to a press briefing room and media lounge.

==== Bharatpol ====
On January 7, 2025, the Indian Home Minister Amit Shah, launched the CBI developed Bharatpol platform. It will help streamline the communication between local law enforcement authorities and Interpol. Rapid and secure transmission of Interpol notices will be guaranteed by the platform. 195 countries' Interpol references will be integrated for global assistance. Local agencies would be able to access the 195 countries' support requests instantly. Additionally, it will streamline capacity-building programs and document management and interchange. Requests for real-time data exchange, including the sending of Red Corner Notices (RCNs) and other alerts over a worldwide network, will be responded to by Bharatpol more quickly both domestically and internationally. Crimes like cybercrime, illegal drug trade, arms trafficking, human trafficking, and terrorism will be addressed with the assistance of Bharatpol. It will have access to 19 different kinds of Interpol databases.

=== Rank structure ===
Insignia	Hierarchy in CBI	Equivalent rank in state police	Grade/level on pay matrix	Basic Pay
	Director of the CBI	Director General of Police	Apex Scale (Pay level 17)	₹225,000 (US$2,400)
	Special Director	Special Director General of Police	HAG+ Scale (Pay level 16)	₹205,400 (US$2,200)—₹224,400 (US$2,400)
	Additional Director	Additional Director General of Police	HAG Scale (Pay level 15)	₹182,200 (US$1,900)—₹224,100 (US$2,400)
	Joint Director	Inspector General of Police	SAG scale (Pay level 14)	₹144,200 (US$1,500)—₹218,200 (US$2,300)
	Deputy Inspector General (DIG)	Deputy inspector general of police	Selection grade (Pay level 13A)	₹131,100 (US$1,400)—₹216,600 (US$2,300)
	Superintendent	Senior Superintendent of Police	Selection Grade (Pay level 13)	₹123,100 (US$1,300)—₹215,900 (US$2,300)
	Superintendent	Superintendent of Police	Junior Administrative Grade (Pay level 12)	₹78,800 (US$840)—₹209,200 (US$2,200)
	Additional Superintendent	Addl Superintendent of Police	Senior time scale (Pay level 11)	₹67,700 (US$720)—₹208,700 (US$2,200)
	Deputy Superintendent	Deputy Superintendent of Police	Junior time scale (Pay level 10)	₹56,100 (US$600)—₹132,000 (US$1,400)
	Inspector	Inspector of Police	Group 'B' Non-gazetted (Pay level 7)	₹44,900 (US$480)—₹142,400 (US$1,500)
	Sub-inspector	Sub-inspector of police	Group 'B' Non-gazetted (Pay level 6)	₹35,400 (US$380)—₹112,400 (US$1,200)
	Assistant sub-inspector	Assistant sub-inspector of police	Group 'C' Non-gazetted (Pay level 5)	₹29,200 (US$310)—₹92,300 (US$990)
	Head constable	Head constable	Group 'C' Non-gazetted (Pay level 4)	₹25,500 (US$270)—₹81,100 (US$870)
	Constable	Constable	Group 'C' Non-gazetted (Pay level 3)	₹21,700 (US$230)—₹69,100 (US$740)

== CBI Academy ==
The CBI Academy in Ghaziabad (east of Delhi) began in 1996. It is about 40 kilometres (25 mi) from the New Delhi railway station and about 65 km (40 mi) from Indira Gandhi International Airport. The 26.5-acre (10.7 ha) campus, with fields and plantations, houses the administrative, academic, hostel and residential buildings. Before the academy was built a small training centre at Lok Nayak Bhawan, New Delhi, conducted short-term in-service courses. The CBI then relied on state police-training institutions and the Sardar Vallabhbhai Patel National Police Academy in Hyderabad for basic training courses for deputy superintendents of police, sub-inspectors and constables.

== Jurisdiction, powers and restrictions ==
In 2022, responding to a question, The Minister of state in the Prime Minister's office informed Rajya Sabha that a total of nine states had withdrawn general consent to the CBI to investigate cases in those states. The states include West Bengal, Maharashtra, Kerala and Punjab. In June 2023, Tamil Nadu became the ninth state to withdraw consent.

=== Investigation of corruption cases ===
The CBI is the primary investigative agency for corruption cases involving Central Government employees under the Prevention of Corruption Act (PC Act) and the Delhi Special Police Establishment (DSPE) Act. However, the scope of its jurisdiction has been subject to legal interpretations.

In a significant ruling, the Kerala High Court held that the Vigilance and Anti-Corruption Bureau (VACB), a state anti-corruption agency, also possesses the authority to investigate corruption cases involving Central Government employees within the state. The court reasoned that neither the PC Act nor the DSPE Act explicitly prohibits state agencies from investigating such cases.

This ruling underscores the complexities surrounding the jurisdiction of investigative agencies in corruption matters. While the CBI holds primary responsibility, state anti-corruption agencies may also possess concurrent jurisdiction in certain circumstances, depending on the specific provisions of relevant legislation and judicial interpretations.

The High Court observed that neither the Prevention of Corruption Act (PCA) nor the Delhi Special Police Establishment (DSPE) Act of 1946 explicitly prohibits state anti corruption agencies or state police from investigating corruption cases involving Central Government employees. Moreover, neither act grants exclusive investigative authority to the CBI, the Central Vigilance Commission, or any other Central Government entity.

The court, therefore, held that "the VACB, being a specially constituted agency to investigate bribery, corruption and misconduct mainly under the PC Act is always clothed with the authority to investigate offences involving corruption that take place within the State, whether it is committed by a Central government employee or a State Government employee.

=== Relationship with state police ===
The CBI was originally constituted under the Delhi Special Police Establishment Act to operate within the territory of Delhi. As policing and law is a subject that falls within state powers under the structure of Indian federalism, the CBI needs prior consent from other state governments in order to conduct investigations within their territory. This consent can be in the form of a 'general consent' under Section 6 of the Delhi Special Police Establishment Act, which remains in operation for all investigations until it is revoked, or alternatively, a 'specific consent' authorising investigations in individual cases. Once consent is granted, the CBI can investigate economic, corruption, and special crimes (including national security, drugs and narcotics, etc.)

Most Indian states had granted general consent to the CBI to investigate crimes within their territory. However, as of 2020, several states have withdrawn their 'general consent' for the CBI to operate, and require a special consent to be granted on a case to case basis. In November 2018 West Bengal government withdrew general consent for the CBI to investigate, and accused the Central Government of using federal agencies to destabilise state politics. Andhra Pradesh restored general consent in 2019. Chhattisgarh and Maharashtra have given general consent to the CBI after elections. In November 2020, Kerala, Jharkhand, and Punjab withdrew general consent to the CBI. Mizoram had previously withdrawn general consent to the CBI as well. Meghalaya withdrew consent in March 2022, and Tamil Nadu withdrew consent in June 2023, and Karnataka in 2024. Altogether, eight states require prior consent before the CBI can investigate crimes in their territory.

=== High Courts and the Supreme Court ===
The High Courts and the Supreme Court have the jurisdiction to order a CBI investigation into an offence alleged to have been committed in a state without the state's consent, according to a five-judge constitutional bench of the Supreme Court (in Civil Appeals 6249 and 6250 of 2001) on 17 February 2010. The bench ruled:

Being the protectors of civil liberties of the citizens, this Court and the High Courts have not only the power and jurisdiction but also an obligation to protect the fundamental rights, guaranteed by Part III in general and under Article 21 of the Constitution in particular, zealously and vigilantly.

— Five-judge constitutional bench of the Supreme Court of India,

The court clarified this is an extraordinary power which must be exercised sparingly, cautiously and only in exceptional situations.

=== Exemption from Right to Information (RTI) ===
CBI is exempted from the provisions of the Right to Information Act, 2005. This exemption was granted by the government on 9 June 2011 (with similar exemptions to the National Investigation Agency (NIA), the Directorate General of Income Tax Investigation and the National Intelligence Grid (Natgrid)) on the basis of national security. It was criticized by the Central Information Commission and RTI activists, who said the blanket exemption violated the letter and intent of the RTI Act. The exemption was upheld in Madras High Court.

== Divisions ==
- Anti Corruption Division
  - Handles cases involving public servants under the Prevention of Corruption Act.
- Economic Offences Division
  - Investigates bank frauds, financial scams, and serious economic crimes.
- Special Crimes Division
  - Handles cases like murders, crimes of national importance, and high-profile cases referred by states or courts.
- Directorate of Prosecution
  - Prosecution related matters.
- Administration Division
  - Deals with administrative and policy-related matters.
- Policy & Coordination Division
- Central Forensic Science Laboratory (CFSL)

=== Zonal offices ===
CBI, operationally is divided into zones. Each zonal office is headed by a Joint Director and oversees multiple branch offices within its jurisdiction. Major zonal offices are located in cities like Delhi, Mumbai, Chennai, Kolkata, Hyderabad, and Chandigarh. These offices control specialized units such as Anti-Corruption Branches (ACBs), Economic Offences Branches (EOBs), and Special Crimes Branches (SCBs) within their regions, ensuring effective investigation, administrative support, and inter-agency coordination at the regional level.

Each Special Crime Branch (SCB), Anti-Corruption Branch (ACB) and Economic Offences Branch is headed by a Deputy Inspector General (DIG) or Superintendent of Police (SP). They are assisted by Addl.SPs, DySPs, inspectors, sub-inspectors, and constables.

== Conviction rate ==
The CBI's annual conviction rate:

Year	Conviction rate
2025	N/A
2024	69.14%
2023	71.47%
2022	74.59%
2021	67.56%
2020	69.83%
2019	69.19%
2018	68%
2011	67%
2010	70.8%
2009	N/A
2008	66.2%
2007	67.7%

== Recruitment ==
The CBI recruits personnel through both direct and indirect methods. Direct recruitment primarily occurs through the Staff Selection Commission's Combined Graduate Level (SSC CGL) exam, filling entry-level positions for subordinate staff. Indirectly, superior officer positions (Group A) are predominantly filled by deputing experienced and meritorious officers from the Indian Police Service (IPS) cadre and sometimes from Indian Revenue Service (IRS) Cadre. Additionally, subordinate positions can be filled by deputing personnel from various state police forces, union territory police, and other law enforcement agencies.

Officers from State Police Services (SPSs) across India, holding ranks ranging from Deputy superintendent of police (DSPs) to Additional superintendent of police (Addl. SP), as well as subordinate ranks like Inspector and Sub-Inspector of Police, can be deputed to the Central Bureau of Investigation (CBI).

== Controversies and criticism ==
=== Corruption ===
In 2013, Judge of the Supreme Court of India (and later Chief Justice of India) R. M. Lodha criticized the CBI for being a "caged parrot speaking in its master's voice", due to its excessive political interference irrespective of which party happened to be in power.

Because of the CBI's political overtones, it has been exposed by former officials such as Joginder Singh and B. R. Lall (director and joint director, respectively) as engaging in nepotism, wrongful prosecution and corruption. In Lall's book, Who Owns CBI, he details how investigations are manipulated and derailed. Corruption within the organisation has been revealed in information obtained under the RTI Act, and RTI activist Krishnanand Tripathi has alleged harassment from the CBI to save itself from exposure via RTI. The states that have withdrawn consent to the CBI have accused the CBI of being a tool used by the Central Government to unfairly target parties ideologically rivaling them.

=== Political interference ===
Normally, cases assigned to the CBI are sensitive and of national importance. It is standard practice for state police departments to register cases under its jurisdiction; if necessary, the central government may transfer a case to the CBI. The agency has been criticised for its mishandling of several scams. It has also been criticized for dragging its feet investigating prominent politicians, such as P. V. Narasimha Rao, J. Jayalalithaa, Lalu Prasad Yadav, Mayawati and Mulayam Singh Yadav; this tactic leads to their acquittal or non-prosecution.

==== Bofors scandal ====
In January 2006 it was discovered that the CBI had quietly unfrozen bank accounts belonging to Italian businessman Ottavio Quattrocchi, one of those accused in the 1986 Bofors scandal which tainted the government of Rajiv Gandhi. The CBI was responsible for the inquiry into the Bofors case. Associates of then-prime minister Rajiv Gandhi were linked to alleged payoffs made during the mid-1980s by Swedish arms firm AB Bofors, with US millionin kickbacks moved from Britain and Panama to secret Swiss banks. The 410 howitzers purchased in the US million arms sale were reported to be inferior to those offered by a French competitor.

The CBI, which unfroze ₹21 crore (US$2.2 million) in a London bank in accounts held by Bofors, accused Quattrocchi and his wife Maria in 2006 but facilitated his travel by asking Interpol to take him off its wanted list on 29 April 2009. After communications from the CBI, Interpol withdrew the Interpol notice on Quattrocchi.

==== Hawala scandal ====
A 1991 arrest of militants in Kashmir led to a raid on hawala brokers, revealing evidence of large-scale payments to national politicians. The Jain hawala case encompassed former Central ministers Ajit Kumar Panja and P. Shiv Shankar, former Uttar Pradesh governor Motilal Vora, Bharatiya Janata Party leader Yashwant Sinha. The 20 defendants were discharged by Special Judge V. B. Gupta in the ₹ 650-million case, heard in New Delhi.

The judge ruled that there was no prima facie evidence against the accused which could be converted into legal evidence. Those freed included Bharatiya Janata Party president L. K. Advani; former Central ministers V. C. Shukla, Arjun Singh, Madhavrao Scindia, N. D. Tiwari and R. K. Dhawan, and former Delhi chief minister Madan Lal Khurana. In 1997 a ruling by late Chief Justice of India J. S. Verma listed about two dozen guidelines which, if followed, would have ensured the independence of the investigating agency. Sixteen years later, successive governments circumvent the guidelines and treat the CBI as another wing of the government. Although the prosecution was prompted by a public-interest petition, the cases concluded with no convictions. In Vineet Narain & Others v Government of India AIR 1996 SC 3386, the Supreme Court ruled that the Central Vigilance Commission should have a supervisory role over the CBI.

==== Priyadarshini Mattoo murder case ====
In this case Santosh Kumar Singh, the alleged murderer of a 25-year-old law student, was acquitted for what the judge called "deliberate inaction" by the investigating team. The accused was the son of a high-ranking officer in the Indian Police Service, the reason for the CBI's involvement. The 1999 judgment noted that "the influence of the father of the accused has been there". Embarrassed by the judgment, CBI Director R. K. Raghavan appointed two special directors (P. C. Sharma and Gopal Achari) to study the judgement. The CBI appealed the verdict in Delhi High Court in 2000, and the court issued a warrant for the accused. The CBI applied for an early hearing in July 2006; in October the High Court found Singh guilty of rape and murder, sentencing him to death.

==== Sister Abhaya ====
This case concerns 27 March 1992 death of a nun who was found in a water well in the Saint Pius X convent hostel in Kottayam, Kerala. Five CBI investigations have failed to yield any suspects. The case was solved finally in December 2020 where the Main Accused were sentenced to life imprisonment by The Kerala High Court.

==== Sohrabuddin case ====
In 2010, the Supreme Court transferred to the CBI the investigation into the alleged 2005 fake encounter killing of Sohrabuddin Sheikh, his wife Kauser Bi, and witness Tulsiram Prajapati by Gujarat Police. The CBI arrested then Gujarat Minister of State for Home Amit Shah in July 2010 on charges of murder and conspiracy; Shah received bail in October 2010 and was formally discharged by a special CBI court in December 2014 for lack of evidence.

Gujarat CID officer Geeta Johri alleged in 2010 that the CBI was pressuring her to falsely implicate Shah, claiming the probe was politically motivated by the Congress-led central government against the BJP-ruled Gujarat government.

In December 2018, a special CBI court in Mumbai acquitted all 22 accused (including senior police officers), citing insufficient evidence and hostile witnesses. In October 2025, the CBI informed the Bombay High Court that it would not challenge the acquittals.

==== Sant Singh Chatwal case ====
Sant Singh Chatwal was a suspect in CBI records for 14 years. The agency had filed two charge sheets, sent Letters rogatory abroad and sent a team to the United States to imprison Chatwal and his wife from 2–5 February 1997. On 30 May 2007 and 10 August 2008 former CBI directors Vijay Shankar and Ashwani Kumar, respectively, signed no-challenge orders on the imprisonment. Later, it was decided not to appeal their release.

This closed a case of bank fraud in which Chatwal had been embroiled for over a decade. Along with four others, Chatwal was charged with being part of a "criminal conspiracy" to defraud the Bank of India's New York branch of ₹28.32 crore (US$3.0 million). Four charges were filed by the CBI, with Chatwal named a defendant in two. The other two trials are still in progress. RTI applicant Krishnanand Tripathi was denied access to public information concerning the closed cases. The Central Information Commission later ordered the CBI to disclose the information; however, the CBI is exempt from the RTI Act (see above). Chatwal is a recipient of the Padma Bhushan.

==== Malankara Varghese murder case ====
This case concerns 5 December 2002 death of T. M. Varghese (also known as Malankara Varghese), a member of the Malankara Orthodox Syrian Church managing committee and a timber merchant. Varghese Thekkekara, a priest and manager of the Angamali diocese of the rival Jacobite Syrian Christian Church (part of the Syriac Orthodox Church), was charged with murder and conspiracy on 9 May 2010. Thekkekara was not arrested after he was charged, for which the CBI was criticised by the Kerala High Court and the media.

==== Bhopal gas tragedy ====
The CBI was publicly seen as ineffective in trying the 1984 Bhopal disaster case. Former CBI joint director B. R. Lall has said that he was asked to remain soft on extradition for Union Carbide CEO Warren Anderson and drop the charges (which included culpable homicide). Those accused received two-year sentences.

==== 2G spectrum case ====
The UPA government has been accused of allocating 2G spectrum to corporations at very low prices through corrupt and illegal means. The Supreme Court cited the CBI many times for its tardiness in the investigations; only after the court began monitoring its investigations were high-profile arrests made.

==== Indian coal allocation scam ====
This is a political scandal concerning the Indian UPA government's allocation of the nation's coal deposits to private companies by the former Prime Minister Manmohan Singh, which cost the government ₹10,673.03 billion (US$110 billion). CBI director Ranjit Sinha submitted an affidavit in the Supreme Court that the coal-scam status report prepared by the agency was shared with Congress Party law minister Ashwani Kumar "as desired by him" and with secretary-level officers from the prime minister's office (PMO) and the coal ministry before presenting it to the court.

==== 2008 Noida double murder case ====
This is a double murder case of 14-year-old girl Aarushi Talwar and 45-year-old Hemraj Banjade from Noida, India. On 26 November 2013, parents of the girl, Rajesh and Nupur Talwar, were sentenced to life imprisonment for the murders. In January 2014, the Talwars challenged the decision in the Allahabad High Court. The High Court's acquitted them of all charges on 12 October 2017 because of the lack of 'irresistible proof'. The Allahabad HC in its verdict said that there were loopholes in the evidence which found the parents not guilty. Court also said that CBI tampered with evidence and tutored witnesses. Questions arose by nation on investigation and judgement given by CBI court.

2024 Kolkata rape and murder case

This is a rape and murder case of a 31-year-old female post-graduate trainee doctor at the R. G. Kar Medical College and Hospital in Kolkata, India. On 13 December 2024, the former R. G. Kar principal Sandip Ghosh and the station house officer of the Tala Police Station Abhijit Mondal were granted bail by the Sealdah Court in Kolkata for destruction of evidence in the 2024 Kolkata rape and murder case as the CBI failed to file a chargesheet against Ghosh and Mondal within a span of 90 days. This has led to a widespread outrage as the victim's parents were not satisfied with the CBI investigation stating that evidence had been destroyed by Ghosh and Mondal.

=== Political repression ===
Several opposition parties in India have alleged that under the present government's rule, CBI is increasingly being used as a tool for political repression. 14 opposition parties filed a plea in Supreme Court in this regard. However it was junked on April 5, 2023.

== In popular culture ==
- The CBI has been portrayed in multiple Indian films across languages. Most notably in the Malayalam film franchise CBI Film Franchise scripted by SN Swamy and directed by K Madhu with veteran actor and film producer Mammootty portraying the lead role of CBI officer Sethurama Iyer.
- The movie Special 26 is a popular heist thriller where a group poses as CBI officers. This movie shows real law enforcement agencies, including the CBI, investigating the fake CBI officers.
- The series Scam 1992 – The Harshad Mehta Story shows CBI investigating Harshad Mehta's case.
- Federal Agency from DC Comics.

== See also ==
- Director of the Central Bureau of Investigation
- Indian Intelligence Community
- Bharatpol
- Directorate of Revenue Intelligence, anti-smuggling
- Enforcement Directorate, anti economic crimes
- Financial Intelligence Unit, anti money laundering
- Narcotics Control Bureau, anti drug trafficking
- National Investigation Agency, anti terrorism
- NIA Most Wanted

Other countries

- Federal Bureau of Investigation
- United States Secret Service
- Serious Fraud Office (United Kingdom)
- National Crime Agency
- National Police Agency (Japan)
- Federal Criminal Police Office (Germany)
