= Anshu Jain =

British-Indian businessman (1963–2022)

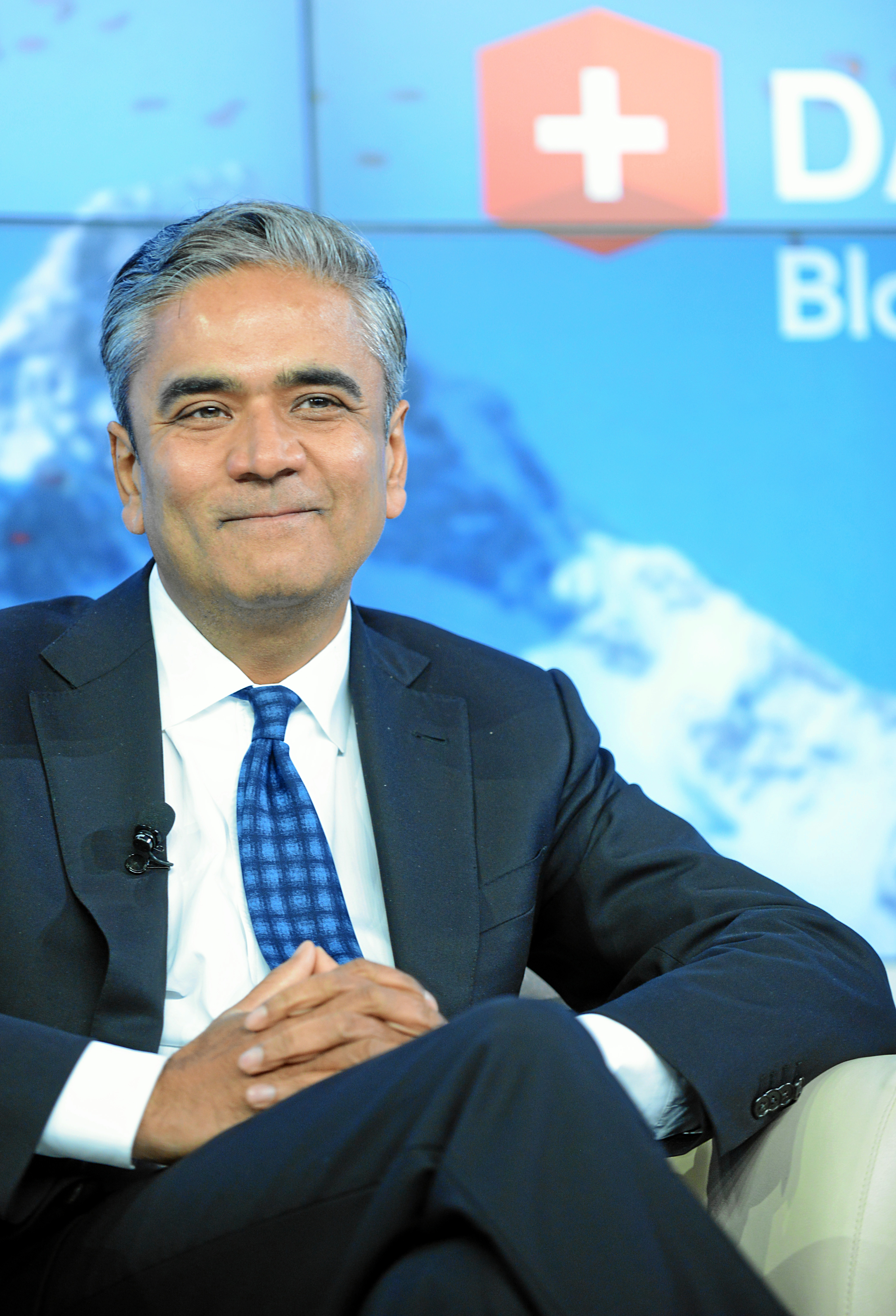
- Jain at the World Economic Forum Annual Meeting in 2013
- Born: 7 January 1963; Jaipur, Rajasthan, India
- Died: 12 August 2022 (aged 59); London, England
- Citizenship: United Kingdom
- Education: Shri Ram College of Commerce; Delhi University; University of Massachusetts Amherst
- Occupation: Business executive
- Title: President of Cantor Fitzgerald; Co-CEO of Deutsche Bank
- Spouse: Geetika Jain
- Children: 2
- Parent(s): Ambuj Jain; Shashi Jain
- Relatives: Ajit Jain (cousin)

Anshuman "Anshu" Jain (7 January 1963 – 12 August 2022) was an Indian-born British business executive. From 2017 to 2022, he was the president of the American financial services firm Cantor Fitzgerald. He previously served as the Global co-CEO and co-Chairman of Deutsche Bank from June 2012 until July 2015. Jain was also a member of Deutsche Bank's Management Board. He was previously head of its Corporate and Investment Bank, globally responsible for Deutsche Bank's corporate finance, sales and trading, and transaction banking business. Jain remained a consultant to the bank until January 2016.

== Early life and education ==
Jain was born on 7 January 1963 in Jaipur, Rajasthan, India, and his father Ambuj Kumar Jain was a history teacher who became a career civil servant and served in the Indian Audit and Accounts Service. He was raised in the Jain religion and was a vegetarian. When he was six, Jain moved with his father to Nizamuddin West in Delhi, and attended Delhi Public School, Mathura Road.

From 1975 to 1977, Jain briefly attended a private Indian school in Kabul due to his father's job transfer before moving back to Delhi and completing his schooling from DPS, Mathura Road.

He studied at Shri Ram College of Commerce at the University of Delhi and earned Bachelor of Arts in economics in 1983. He then moved to the U.S. at the age of 19, and in 1985 he received a Master of Business Administration in finance from the Isenberg School of Management at the University of Massachusetts Amherst, where he was a member of Beta Gamma Sigma. At the university, he studied with Thomas Schneeweis, an expert in alternative investments such as futures, options, and derivatives.

== Career ==
=== Kidder Peabody and Merrill Lynch, 1985–1995 ===
After receiving his MBA, Jain began his career on Wall Street. He was hired as an analyst in derivatives research at Kidder, Peabody & Co., where he worked from 1985 to 1988.

In 1988, he moved to Merrill Lynch. He spent seven years there, setting up and running its global hedge fund coverage group, selling interest-rate swaps and other financial products to hedge funds. At the company he met Edson Mitchell, a talented investment banker who became his mentor.

=== Deutsche Bank investment banker and executive, 1995–2012 ===
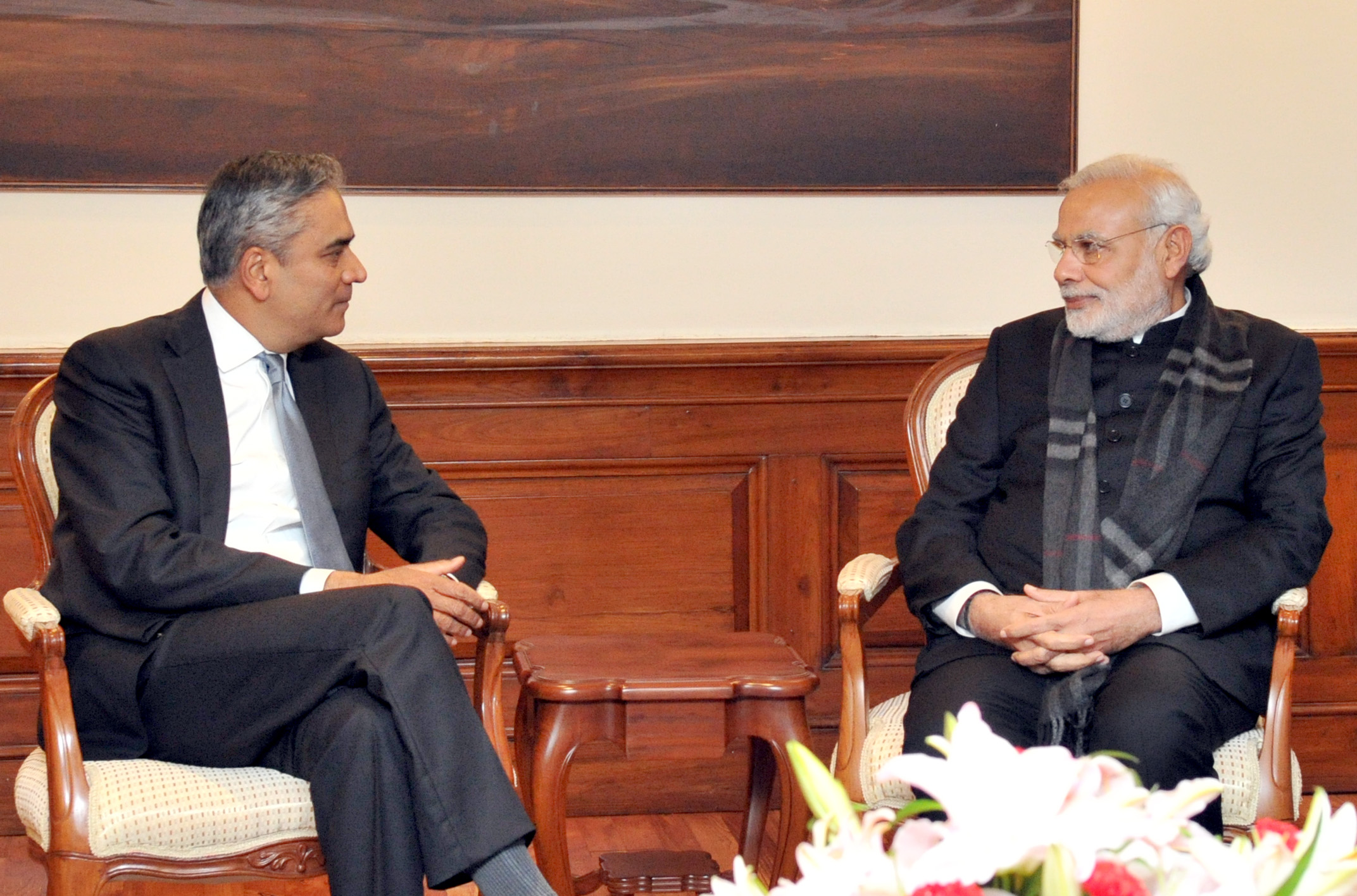
Anshuman Jain, CEO of Deutsche Bank with 14th Prime Minister of India Narendra Modi in New Delhi on 2015.

In 1995, Deutsche Bank hired Jain's mentor Edson Mitchell away from Merrill Lynch and tasked him with creating a world-class investment bank division in London. Mitchell brought Jain with him, and hired hundreds of Merrill Lynch investment bankers to accompany them to London. Jain joined Deutsche Bank in June 1995 to head a combined group which marketed fixed-income derivatives to large investors and hedge funds. In February 1997, he was named head of Deutsche Bank's newly formed Global Institutional Client Group, and expanded fixed income into foreign exchange and credit derivatives. In mid-2000, he became head of global capital markets, sales, over-the-counter derivatives, global credit derivatives, and emerging markets.

When Mitchell died in a plane crash in December 2000, Jain succeeded him as head of Global Markets in early 2001. In September 2004, he was appointed co-head of the Corporate and Investment Bank, together with Michael Cohrs; Jain's responsibility was for the equities trading division and integrating it with the fixed-income division he already headed. This investment bank division was highly profitable under his leadership and produced the lion's share of Deutsche Bank's profits. Jain was noted as having helped build Deutsche Bank into a fixed-income powerhouse, more than doubling debt sales and trading revenue between 2000 and 2009, and for building Deutsche Bank into a global investment bank that rivalled Wall Street's giant firms.

Cohrs retired in 2010, and Jain became head of the entire Corporate and Investment Bank, overseeing global sales and trading operations that included bonds, commodities, emerging markets, equities, foreign exchange, money markets, credit derivatives, and interest-rate trading. This put Jain in charge of the unit that generated more than 80% of Deutsche Bank's profit, which strengthened his position as a probable successor to CEO Josef Ackermann, even though Jain was based in London and spoke no German. He had already been appointed to Deutsche Bank's 12-member Group Executive Committee, newly created by Ackermann, in 2002, and to its Management Board (Vorstand) in 2009.

=== Co-CEO of Deutsche Bank, 2012–2015 ===
In July 2011, Jain was appointed co-CEO of Deutsche Bank, along with native German Jürgen Fitschen, effective 1 June 2012. During their years of co-leadership, Fitschen handled Deutsche Bank's retail bank and German affairs, and also handled the Deutsche Bank's relations with the Berlin government and other German stakeholders. Jain led the investment bank plus asset and wealth management, and was the face of Deutsche Bank internationally.

Jain combined the bank's asset management and wealth management divisions into a single unit, and expanded it to be a global competitor closer in size to Deutsche Bank's other major units. He put Michele Faissola in charge of the unit, and to assist expansion had it do cross-business with Deutsche Bank's investment banking division.

During Jain's tenure as co-CEO, Deutsche Bank was faced with a variety of regulatory investigations into and litigation concerning its 21st-century activities, many of them regarding divisions which Jain had had broad oversight for at the time and which CEO Ackermann had pressured to deliver increasingly outsized profits. Many of these investigations resulted in steep fines. In March 2013, Deutsche Bank restated its 2012 earnings report due to litigation costs, and Jain's and Fitschen's compensation for 2012 was cut to €4.8 million ($6.2 million) each. Subsequent regulatory fines included $2.5 billion in penalties in April 2015 to four regulators in the U.S. and UK over claims that Deutsche Bank traders had manipulated key interest-rate benchmarks such as the London Interbank Offered Rate (Libor) between 2005 and 2011. Deutsche Bank had already paid nearly $1 billion in 2013 in a European Commission antitrust investigation into Libor; the 2015 penalty brought its total Libor fines to $3.5 billion.

Jain and Fitschen made headway in capitalizing the bank and cutting costs. They sold holdings, reduced trading risk, and adjusted internal models to reduce the amount of capital needed to absorb losses. Jain lowered the bank's risk by unloading opaque, hard-to-trade assets. He also reduced bonuses. As time went on, however, shareholders found the improvements insufficient, regulatory fines and litigation fees sharply cut into profitability, and shareholders grew frustrated as Deutsche Bank failed to meet profit or earnings targets and as share price underperformed.

During his co-CEO tenure, Jain was also faced with criticism for not restructuring and transitioning Deutsche Bank away from the high-risk, increasingly scrutinized and regulated field of investment banking sufficiently or soon enough. A five-year restructuring plan that he and Fitschen unveiled in April 2015 was viewed by many shareholders and analysts as too little too late, and at the bank's annual meeting in May 2015 only 61% of shareholders voted in favor of the two co-CEOs' plan.

Seeing this as a loss of shareholder confidence, and facing criticism from employees over job cuts and closures in the restructuring plan, and in the wake of the April 2015 Libor fine and report plus a subsequent $55 million SEC fine and an internal Russian money-laundering probe, Jain and Fitschen announced their resignation on 7 June 2015. Fitschen stayed on as transition co-CEO with newly appointed CEO John Cryan through 19 May 2016.

=== Career after Deutsche Bank, 2015–2022 ===
In 2016, Jain became an advisor to the San Francisco–based company SoFi (Social Finance, Inc.), a fintech firm.

In January 2017, he became president of Cantor Fitzgerald, a mid-sized, private New York–based firm, headed by Howard Lutnick, which offers investment banking and other financial services. Jain also stepped down from his role at SoFi. He was hired at Cantor Fitzgerald to help expand fixed-income and equities trading as well as prime brokerage, and he worked alongside Lutnick and directed strategy, vision, and operational foundation across the firm's businesses.

Jain was on the advisory board of InCred, a non-banking financial company in India. He was on the finance group advisory board of the MIT Sloan School of Management. He was on the board of trustees of Chance to Shine, a British charitable foundation. He was a member of the advisory board of the Wildlife Conservation Trust, based in India. He was previously on the board of directors of the Institute of International Finance, was a member of the Financial Services Forum, and served on the international advisory panel of the Monetary Authority of Singapore.

== Awards ==
In 2003 Jain received Euromoney magazine's Capital Markets Achievement Award. In 2006 he was honoured by the American India Foundation for his philanthropy and leadership. In 2010 he received Risk magazine's Lifetime Achievement Award, as well as the annual Business Leader Award from NASSCOM. In 2012 he was named Global Indian of the Year by The Economic Times at the Economic Times Awards. In 2014, he was awarded an Honorary Fellowship from London Business School, and an Honorary Doctorate by TERI University in New Delhi.

== Personal life ==
Jain was married to Geetika, a travel writer and children's book author. The couple lived in London and also had a residence in New York City. The couple have two children. Jain's interests included cricket, golf, wildlife photography, and wildlife conservation.

Anshuman has a biological brother Ashwin Jain and has a cousin Ajit Jain, who since 2018 has been vice chairman of insurance operations for Berkshire Hathaway.

Jain died from duodenal cancer in London on 12 August 2022, at the age of 59.

== See also ==
- Indians in the New York City metropolitan region
