= Institute for Stem Cell Science and Regenerative Medicine =

Indian research Institute

Institute for Stem Cell Science and Regenerative Medicine (inStem)
- Parent institution: Biotechnology Research and Innovation Council (BRIC)
- Established: 2009; 17 years ago
- Director: Maneesha S. Inamdar
- Budget: ₹60.59 crore (US$6.3 million) (2022-2023)
- Endowment: Infosys Foundation, Wildlife Conservation Trust and Kiran Mazumdar-Shaw
- Location: Bengaluru, Karnataka, India
- Website: https://instem.res.in/

Institute for Stem Cell Science and Regenerative Medicine (inStem) is an Indian research organisation focused on stem cell science and regenerative medicine. inStem, located in Bangalore, Karnataka, was established in 2009 and functions as an autonomous institution under the Department of Biotechnology (DBT), Ministry of Science and Technology, Government of India.

The institute aims to develop cellular therapies for cancer, cardiovascular diseases, and Neurodegenerative diseases conditions through understanding of stem cell biology, human disease models, and regenerative medicine technologies.

== History ==
The inStem initiative stemmed from the absence of a dedicated stem cell research center in India. As part of a government initiative to promote high-end biotechnology and health research in India, the institute was established. inStem is funded through the Department of Biotechnology and collaborates with numerous national and international institutions.

== Research Focus ==
inStem's research efforts encompass a broad range of disciplines of stem cell biology and regenerative medicine. Some of the major areas of research interest include:

- Stem Cell Biology: Elucidating the basic characteristics of stem cells, such as pluripotency, differentiation, and self-renewal.
- Disease Modeling: Utilizing stem cells to generate disease models to investigate conditions like cancer, Alzheimer's, and heart disease.
- Regenerative Medicine: Designing stem cell-based therapies for tissue repair and regeneration.
- Gene Editing and Therapy: Exploring CRISPR-Cas9 and other gene-editing technologies for therapeutic purposes.
- Bioinformatics and Stem Cell Data Analysis: Applying computational methods to analyze high-throughput datasets in stem cell biology.

== Facilities and Collaborations ==
inStem has sophisticated cell culture laboratories, molecular biology laboratories, microscopy facilities, and bioinformatics facilities. The institute also interfaces with different universities, hospitals, and research organizations across the globe to further its research objectives.

It forms part of the Bangalore Life Sciences Cluster, a collaborative research facility shared with the National Centre for Biological Sciences (NCBS) and the Centre for Cellular and Molecular Platforms (C-CAMP).

== Notable persons ==
- K. Vijayraghavan
- Satyajit Mayor
