= Edson Mitchell =

American investment banker and executive

- Born: May 19, 1953; Portland, Maine, US
- Died: December 22, 2000 (aged 47) near Rangeley, Maine, US
- Other name: Edson V. Mitchell
- Education: MBA
- Alma mater: Colby College; Dartmouth's Ames Tuck School
- Occupations: Investment banker, Executive former CEO of Deutsche Bank
- Spouse: Suzan James
- Children: 5

Edson Mitchell (May 19, 1953 – December 22, 2000) was an American investment banker and executive. He served as the head of Deutsche Bank's global markets organization. During his tenure, he transformed the bank into a major and highly profitable player in trading bonds, securities and foreign currencies. Mitchell was one of the first two Americans to be appointed to the nine-member management board of Deutsche Bank. He was a descendant of Swedish immigrants.

== Early life and education ==
Mitchell was born on May 19, 1953, in Portland, Maine and raised in South Portland and Auburn. He went to Edward Little High School and later graduated with a degree in Economics from Colby College in 1975. He received an MBA from Dartmouth's Amos Tuck School in 1978.

== Career ==
Mitchell started his career in the banking industry in 1978, starting at Bank of America in Chicago before moving to New York to join Merrill Lynch in 1980. In 1995, he was recruited by Deutsche Bank to head its global markets organization in London. Under his leadership, the bank's global trading activities became highly profitable.

In June 2000, Mitchell and his colleague, Michael Philipp, were appointed to Deutsche Bank's nine-member management board, making them the first two Americans to hold such positions. Mitchell was expected to take over as the head of Deutsche Bank's investment banking group in 2002, succeeding Josef Ackermann.

When Mitchell took over as chief executive officer of Deutsche Bank, the bank implemented several bold measures in investment banking, including the integration with London's Morgan Grenfell bank, divestment of corporate holdings, acquisition of top financial talent from competing banks and the purchase of US Bankers Trust in 1999. These strategic moves proved to be effective, positioning the bank as a major player in the financial sector.

== Books ==
In 2013, Death of an Investment Banker: A Moral History of the Financial Industry was published by Verlag Herder. It is written by Nils Ole Oerman, based on the life of Edson Mitchell. Originally it was written in German.

- Nils Ole Oermann: Death of an investment banker: a moral history of the financial industry. Verlag Herder, Freiburg 2013, ISBN 978-3-451-30676-1.

== Death ==
On December 22, 2000, Edson Mitchell died in a plane crash while flying from Portland, Maine to his vacation home in Rangeley, Maine. He was the sole passenger in the Beech 200 aircraft, while the pilot, Stephen A. Bean, also died. He was 47 years old at the time of his death.

== Personal life ==
Edson Mitchell met his wife Suzan James, when they both were at Edward Little High School. They got married on November 11, 1972. They had two sons and three daughters. He also had strong ties to his New England roots. Mitchell was known for his competitive nature and was described by colleagues as an intense and brash person with a quick temper. He was highly regarded for his success in the banking industry and his death was a major loss for Deutsche Bank and the industry.

=== Philanthropy ===
He was engaged in various activities related to community service and philanthropy. He served as an Overseer and Trustee of Colby College an overseer of Dartmouth College. He established a scholarship fund and a Professorship in Economics to support students from Western Maine. He was also a co-founder of the Rangeley Lakes Heritage Trust, an environmental organization that aimed to preserve the natural beauty of Maine while promoting economic opportunities. It preserved 10,000 acres in the Rangeley Lakes region and offered educational programs for youth through its summer program, Ecoventure in Maine.
