= Shiv Kumari of Kotah =

- Rajmata of Kotah
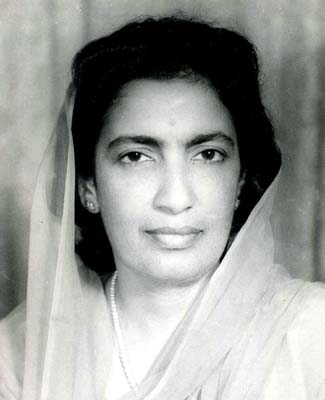
- Born: March 1, 1916
- Died: January 12, 2012 (aged 95)

Her Highness Rajmata Shiv Kumari of Kotah (1 March 1916 – 12 January 2012) was an Indian Hindu royal and the daughter of Maharaja Ganga Singh of Bikaner.

== Early life ==
Born in 1916 (although other sources indicate 1913 and 1915) she was married to Maharao Bhim Singh of Kotah in 1930. She was not, however, bound by the traditional restrictions of the Purdah. Kumari’s father ensured that she received modern education along with her male siblings at home. The Rathor Rajput princess was skilled in shooting and killed more than forty tigers both before and after her marriage.

As the Maharani of Kotah she became committed to the cause of education along with her contemporary and friend, Maharani Gayatri Devi of Jaipur. Kumari is vice-president of the latter’s Maharani Gayatri Devi Girls’ Public School in Jaipur.

== Politics ==
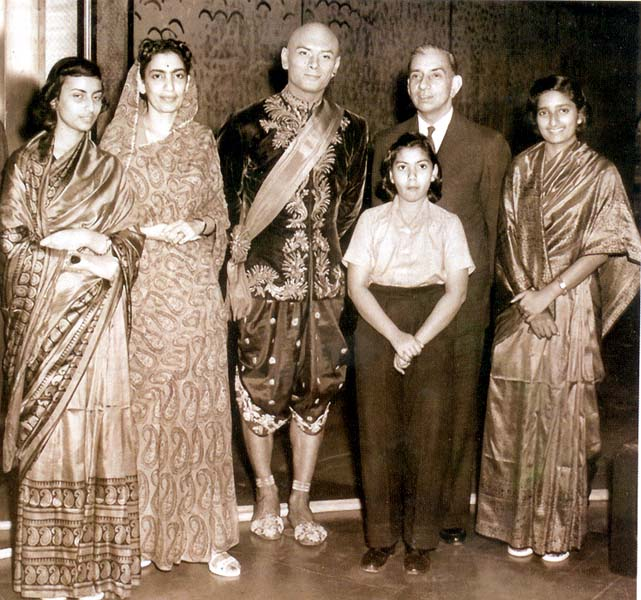
The Maharani and Maharao with Hollywood actor Yul Brynner and other members of the family.

While her husband was the ceremonial governor of Rajasthan, Kumari was also active in politics and was elected to the Rajasthan Legislative Assembly as an independent member from Khanpur (Jhalawar District) from 1966-71. Along with her husband and family she traveled all around the world in the early decades of India’s independence.

Kumari was active in the socio-economic uplift of the Rajput community and is the vice-president of the Rajput Sabha. Like her contemporaries in Indian royalty she remained interested in the preservation of wildlife and jungle habitat. She managed a small estate near Kota called Nawal Bagh, which had been bequeathed to her by Maharao Bhim Singh.

== Rajmata ==
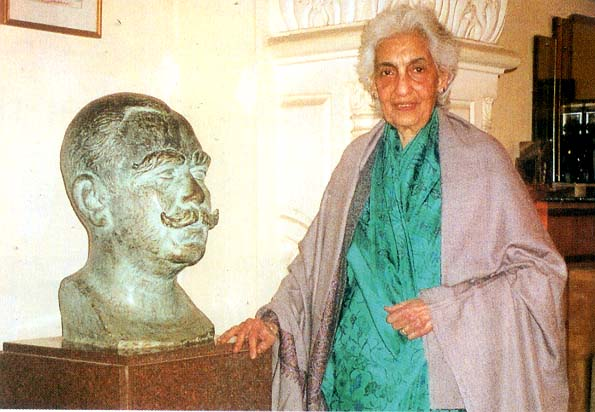
The Rajmata standing next to a bust of her famous father Maharaja Ganga Singh

Following the death of Maharao Bhim Singh in 1991, Kumari became the Rajmata (Queen Mother) while her son Brijraj Singh became the next Maharao. The royal residence of Umaid Bhawan was converted into a hotel but she continued to reside in the upper portions of the palace until her death in January 2012.

== Death ==
Kumari died on the evening of 12 January 2012. She had been admitted to the Intensive Care Unit of the Bharat Vikas Parishad Hospital in Kota on 9 January following a deterioration in the functioning of her kidneys. On the afternoon 12 January she was brought back by her family to her residence, the Ummed Bhawan Palace, without any improvement in her condition and the doctors declaring her death only a matter of time. Her last rites were performed on 13 January 2012.
