= Josef Ackermann =

Swiss banker

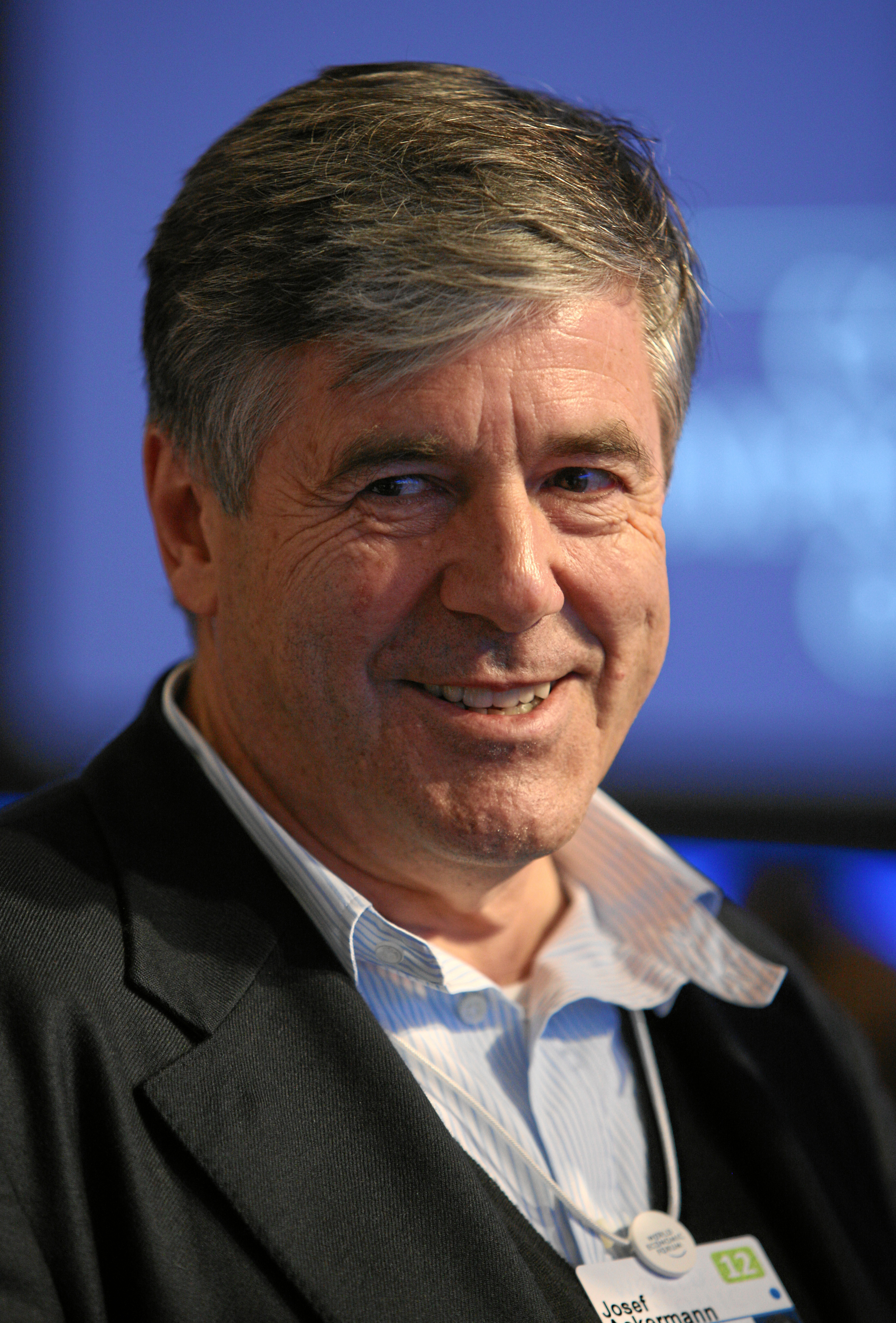
- Ackermann at the World Economic Forum annual meeting in 2012
- Born: Josef Meinrad Ackermann; 7 February 1948 (age 78); Walenstadt, Canton of St. Gallen, Switzerland
- Education: University of St. Gallen
- Occupation: Banker
- Employers: Deutsche Bank (CEO, 2002–2012); Bank of Cyprus (Chairman, 2014–2019)

Josef Meinrad Ackermann (born 7 February 1948) is a Swiss banker, former chairman of the Bank of Cyprus, and former chief executive officer of Deutsche Bank. He has also been a member of the Washington-based financial advisory body, the Group of Thirty.

== Early life ==
He was born in Walenstadt, Canton of St. Gallen, Switzerland, raised in Mels in a Catholic home, and is a graduate of the University of St. Gallen (HSG). After studying economics and social sciences at the University of St. Gallen in Switzerland, he continued his time there as a research assistant at the Department of Economics and went on to receive a doctorate in the subject.

== Career ==
After leaving university Ackermann went to work in 1977 for the Swiss multinational investment bank Credit Suisse, which he left in 1996. In the same year he joined the board of directors of the Deutsche Bank in Frankfurt am Main. He served as chairman of the board from 2002 to 2012. In March 2019 The New York Times reported that Ackermann was aware of the business dealings between the New York branch of the bank and Donald Trump.

Ackermann agreed at the end of 2009 to continue as chief executive of Deutsche Bank for another three years until 2013. At the annual shareholder meeting in late May 2012, he "handed over the CEO baton" to co-CEOs Anshu Jain and Juergen Fitschen.

According to the Financial Times Deutschland Ackerman earned €9.4 million in 2009 and €8.8 million in 2010. His included bonus in 2009 was €8.2 million and €7.1 million in 2010.

Ackermann is a member of the Steering Committee of the Bilderberg Group.

Other positions held:

- Second deputy chairman of Siemens AG (but he has announced his resignation in September 2013)
- Director of Renova Management part of Viktor Vekselberg's Renova Group
- Non-executive director of Shell
- Visiting professor of finance at the London School of Economics
- Visiting professor at the Johann Wolfgang Goethe University
- President of the board of trustees of the St. Gallen Foundation for International Studies
- President of the board of patrons of the Institute for Corporate Culture Affairs
- Chairman of the board of directors of the Institute of International Finance
- Bilderberg Meetings attendee 2010, 2011, 2012, 2013, 2014
- Chairman of the board of directors of the World Economic Forum
- Advisory board member of Macro Hive

Days after retirement and on the eve of a conference call by G7 finance ministers and central bank governors on the continuing European debt crisis, Ackerman said in a speech to the Atlantic Council that "Germany will ultimately take whatever steps [are] necessary to keep the euro zone intact", according to one report. The country "is moving cautiously because it simply fears that countries on the European periphery will stop reform measures if they see that Berlin is going to guarantee everything", he continued.

He was a non-executive director of Vodafone from 2000 to 2002.

== Return to banking ==
In November 2014 he was elected as chairman of the board of directors of the Bank of Cyprus following the proposal of the new major shareholder of the bank Wilbur Ross, who later became the Commerce Secretary in the first Trump administration.

== Personal life ==
He is married to Pirkko Mölsä, a Finnish national.
