= Lilian G. Lutter =

British educationist

Lillian Godfreda Donnithorne Lutter
- Born: 6 January 1899? Burma
- Died: 18 June 1980
- Occupation: Educationist
- Awards: Padma Shri

Lilian G. Lutter (6 January 1899? – 18 June 1980) was a British educationist who spent most part of her career in India. She was the founder principal of the Maharani Gayatri Devi Girls' Public School, the first all Girls school in the state of Rajasthan, an institution founded by Gayatri Devi of Jaipur with 24 students in 1943. She was honoured by the Government of India in 1970 with Padma Shri, the fourth highest Indian civilian award. She was honored with the title of OBE (Order of the British Empire) for her services to education in 1976

Miss Lutter remains a celebrated name in the history of Indian schooling both for her pioneering role and for being ahead of her time in advocating holistic education for girls.

== See also ==
- Maharani Gayatri Devi Girls' Public School
