= Arjan Kumar Sikri =

Indian judge (born 1954)

Judge of the Supreme Court of India
- In office 12 April 2013 – 6 March 2019
- Appointed by: Pranab Mukherjee

Chief Justice of the Punjab and Haryana High Court
- In office 23 September 2012 – 11 April 2013
- Nominated by: S. H. Kapadia
- Appointed by: Pranab Mukherjee
- Preceded by: Ranjan Gogoi
- Succeeded by: Jasbir Singh (acting)

Personal details
- Born: 7 March 1954 (age 72)
- Spouse: Madhu Sikri
- Children: Saket Sikri
- Education: Shri Ram College of Commerce; Faculty of Law, Delhi; Delhi University

Arjan Kumar Sikri (born 7 March 1954) is an eminent Indian jurist and a former judge of the Supreme Court of India. He was sworn in as a Supreme Court judge on 12 April 2013. Earlier, he had served as the chief justice of the Punjab and Haryana High Court. He retired as the senior most puisne judge of Supreme Court of India on 6 March 2019.

Since 2019, he is an international judge, at the Singapore International Commercial Court, Singapore Supreme Court. He was sworn in to the post on 2 August 2019, by the President of Singapore. He is also the Chairperson of News Broadcasting Standards Authority. He also acts as an arbitrator in domestic and international disputes.

== Early life and education ==
He completed his B.Com. (Hons.) from Shri Ram College of Commerce, Delhi in 1974. He completed his LL.B. from Faculty of Law, University of Delhi in 1977 and won the gold medal. He also completed his LLM from the Faculty of Law, University of Delhi.

== Career ==
=== As a lawyer ===
Sikri was enrolled as an advocate in 1977 and started practising in Delhi. He had specialization in constitutional, labour, arbitration and service matters. He was counsel for numerous public sector undertakings, educational institutions, banks and financial institutions and various private sector corporations. He was also a part-time lecturer in Campus Law Centre, Delhi University from 1984 to 1989. He was vice-President, Delhi High Court Bar Association from 1994 to 1995. He was designated as a senior advocate by the Delhi High Court in 1997.

=== As a judge ===
Sikri was appointed a judge of the Delhi High Court in July 1999 and also served as the acting chief justice of that high court from 10 October 2011 before being elevated as the chief justice of the Punjab and Haryana High Court in September 2012. In 2013 he was elevated to the Supreme Court of India.

=== Other positions ===
- Member, General Body and Academic Council of National Judicial Academy (India)
- Patron-in-Chief, Delhi Judicial Academy.
- Member of the committee on Restatement of Law by the Chief Justice of India.
- Patron-in-Chief and Executive Chairman, Delhi Legal Services Authority.
- Secretary, International Law Association (Indian Branch)
- Member, Governing Council of the Indian Law Institute
- Chancellor of the National Law University, Delhi (past).
- Sports Ombudsman, Indian Federation Of Sports Gaming’

== Notable judgments ==
- In 2013, a Punjab and Haryana High Court Bench consisting of Chief Justice A. K. Sikri and Justice Jain had upheld the appointment of Punjab director general of police Sumedh Singh Saini who was chargesheeted in a criminal case by a CBI court in Delhi holding that he was "legally competent" to hold his present position.
- A division bench of the Punjab and Haryana High Court headed by Chief Justice Sikri had issued notice to Ministry of External Affairs of India taking cognizance of a Public Interest Litigation application seeking release of two prisoners from Punjab, languishing in Pakistan jails even after completion of their sentence.
- A division bench of the Punjab and Haryana High Court headed by Chief Justice Sikri had issued directions to the states of Punjab and Haryana and Chandigarh administration on what remedial measures to take to curb the menace of crime against women. Earlier he had also noted that Judges have to be sensitized about securing speedy justice in cases related to crime against women, elders, children and discrimination against HIV-infected persons.
- In 2011, as acting Chief Justice of Delhi High Court, he treated a letter addressed to him by a lawyer as suo moto Public Interest Litigation [Writ Petition (Civil) 8889 of 2011]. Letter highlighted the illegal practice of falsification of age of children resulting in their treatment as adult criminals and subsequent incarceration as adults in jails. He issued comprehensive guidelines for various agencies aimed at elimination of incarceration of children as adults in jail. It was in this judgment that he introduced "Age Memo" as a legal tool to document and record age investigation by police.
