= Maneesha S. Inamdar =

Indian academic (born 1967)

Prof. Maneesha S. Inamdar
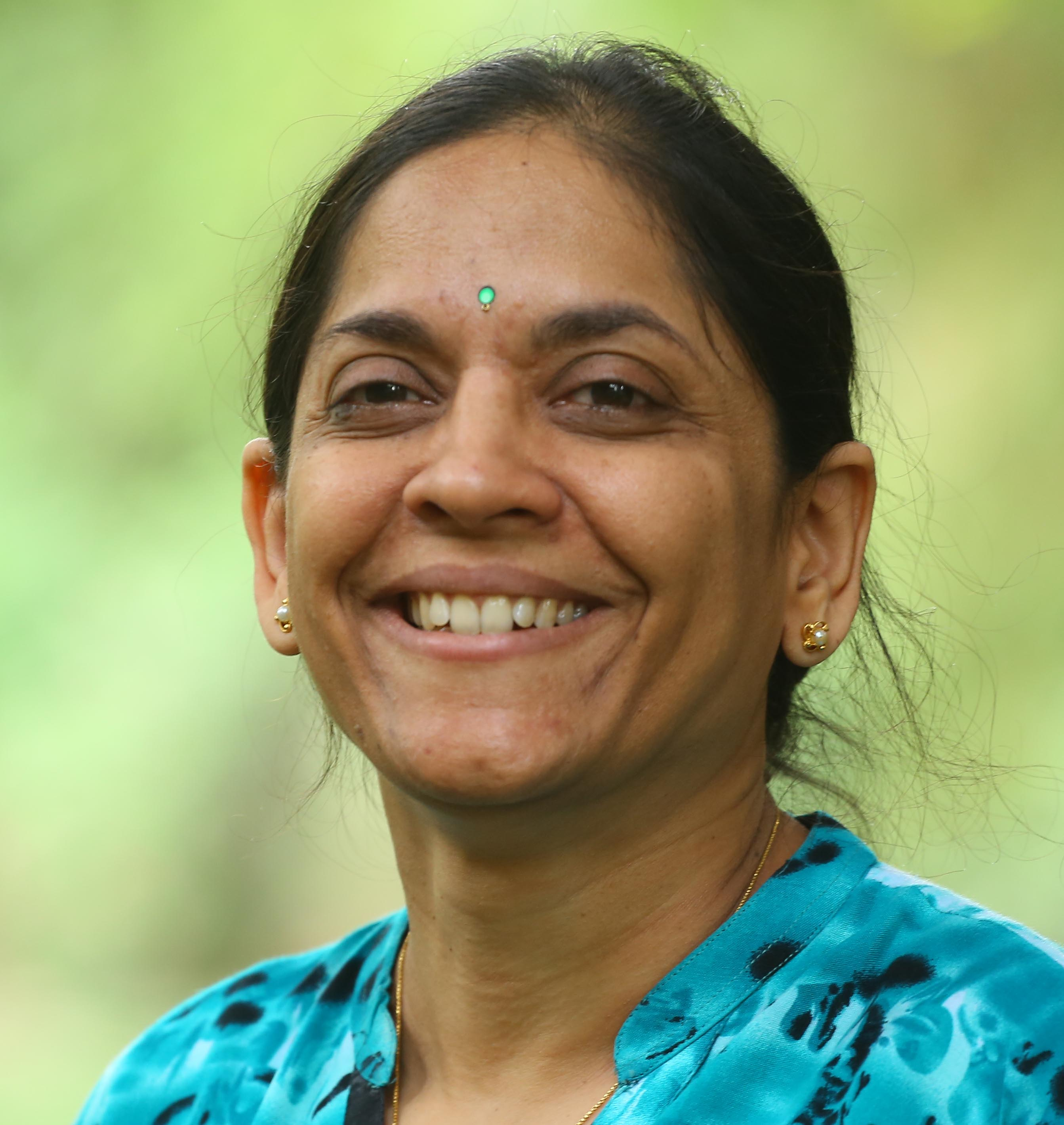
- Born: India
- Education: Tata Institute of Fundamental Research; University of North Carolina at Chapel Hill
- Known for: comparative analysis of cardiovascular development and stem cells
- Awards: 2011 N-BIOS Prize; 2018 Dr. Kalpana Chawla State Award; 2019 Prof. C.N.R. Rao Oration Award
- Scientific career
- Fields: Cell biology; Developmental and stem cell biology
- Workplaces: Jawaharlal Nehru Centre for Advanced Scientific Research; The Institute for Stem Cell Science and Regenerative Medicine (DBT-inStem)

Maneesha Inamdar is a stem cell and developmental biologist conducting research at Bangalore, India. She is Director of inStem (Institute for Stem Cell Science and Regenerative Medicine), and Professor at Jawaharlal Nehru Centre for Advanced Scientific Research (JNCASR), Bangalore. She is an elected fellow of the Indian Academy of Sciences and the Indian National Science Academy and a J C Bose National Fellow with several awards and honors.

== Early career ==
Dr. Inamdar did her Ph.D. at the Tata Institute of Fundamental Research, Mumbai and postdoctoral research at the University of North Carolina, Chapel Hill, USA. She has formerly held the positions of professor and Chairperson (Molecular Biology and Genetics Unit), JNCASR; Dean (Fellowships and Extension Programmes), JNCASR; adjunct professor, inStem and Visiting Professor, Tata Institute for Genetics and Society Centre at inStem.

== Research ==
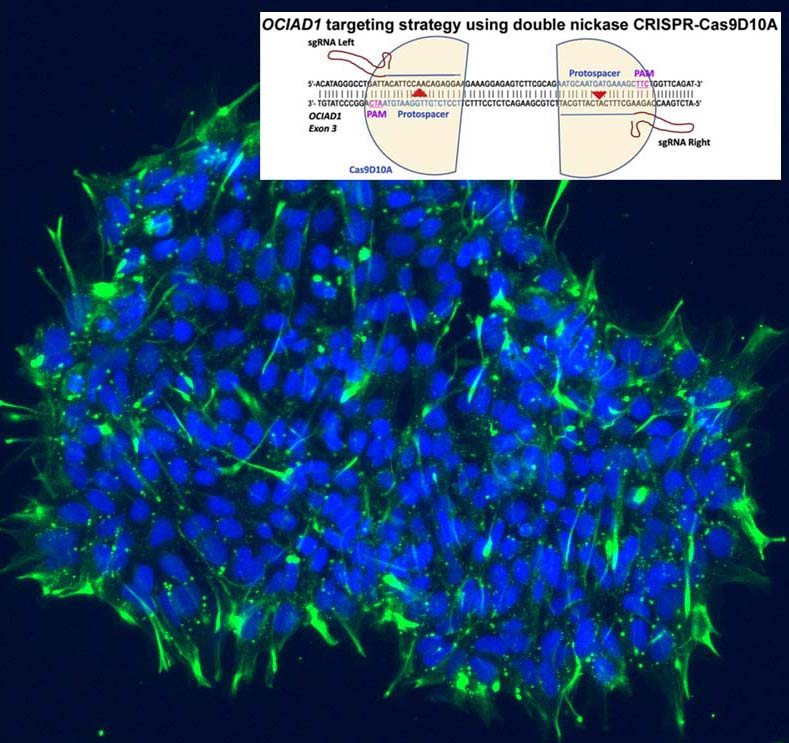
CRISPR modulated stem cell lines

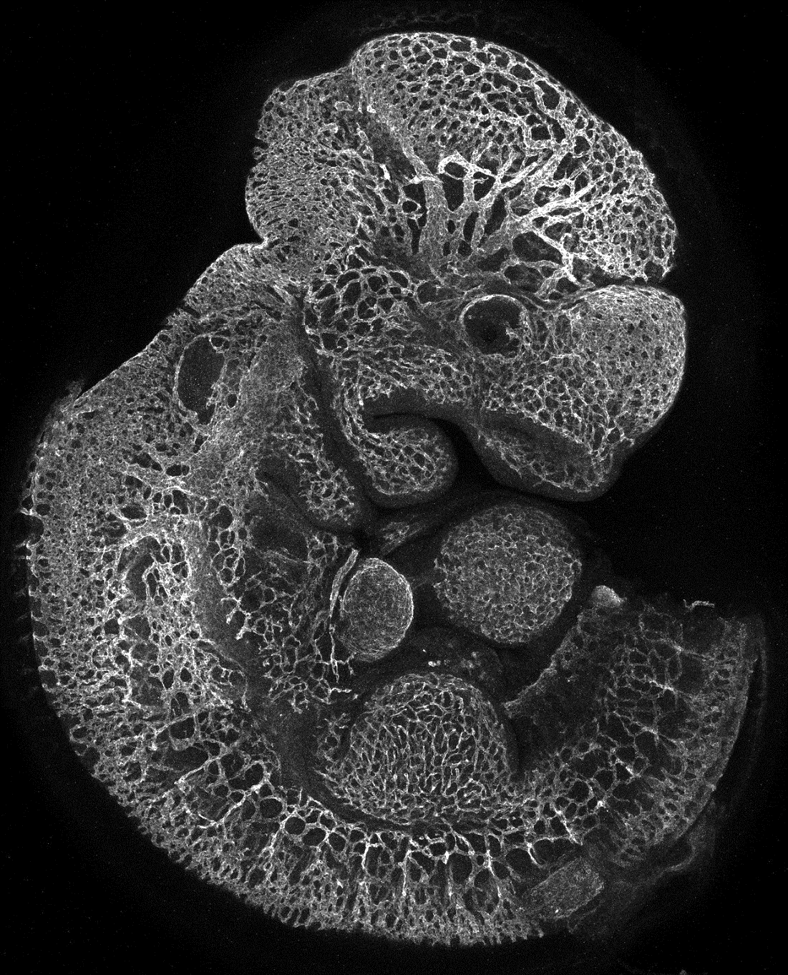
Mouse embryo vasculature

The Inamdar laboratory is unravelling the basic biology of stem cells with the goal of contributing to strategies to control and manipulate them effectively for applications in cell therapy and regenerative medicine. The group uses human stem cells, gene editing and animal models (Drosophila melanogaster and Mouse) to study cardiovascular and blood development, to understand congenital defects and devise regenerative strategies. Combining stem cell biology, genetics, genomics, proteomics and biochemical approaches, through several collaborations, they aim to understand mechanisms that govern stem cell self-renewal and potency. The Inamdar lab also studies neurodegenerative diseases such as Alzheimers disease. Recent work in the laboratory is focused on using organoid models such as gastruloids to understand principles of development. Prof. Inamdar has established the Centre for Research Application and Training in Embryology (CReATE) at inStem, dedicated to advancing the field of embryology through cutting-edge research, practical applications, and comprehensive training programs.

Inamdar's research is funded by several national and international agencies, including the Department of Biotechnology, Government of India and the Gates Foundation. Inamdar has carried out projects for the Department of Science and Technology, the Council of Scientific and Industrial Research and other international agencies including the UK-India Education and Research Initiative (UKIERI), Indo-US Science and Technology Forum (IUSSTF), The Wellcome Trust, UK, the DBT-Indo-Danish programme and the Indo-French Centre for the Promotion of Advanced Research (IFCPAR/CEFIPRA).

=== Key Contributions ===
Dr. Inamdar pioneered human embryonic stem cell derivation and use in India, providing stem cells that represent the Indian genetic diversity, are eligible for use globally and have been distributed worldwide. The stem cell lines have been deposited in the UK Stem Cell Bank and included in the International Stem Cell Forum initiative (ISCI2) projects, being the sole contribution of India in these initiatives. Through her association with various international stem cell organizations and with the WHO Expert Committee on Human Genome Editing, Prof. Inamdar has contributed to several guidance and policy documents on stem cells and gene editing. She heads or serves on several scientific review, funding and ethics committees. While furthering discovery and training, she is deeply involved in science outreach, education and public engagement. Her recent article in the journal Nature was highlighted for its call to bring equity and accessibility through global research standards.

Prof. Inamdar is a member of the International Society for Stem Cell Research (ISSCR), the Indian Society of Cell Biology, and immediate Past President of the Indian Society of Developmental Biologists (InSDB).

She represents India in the International Stem Cell Initiative (ISCI) and the International Stem Cell Banking Initiative (ISCBI) where she is also a member of the steering group. She also serves as an expert and advisor in various capacities in several national and international committees including hESC Registry Europe, International Stem Cell Registry, Europe. She is Chairperson or a member of several national and institutional advisory and review committees for ethics and stem cell research. Inamdar was a member of the Global Forum on Bioethics in Research (GFBR) planning committee (2019) and the World Health Organization (WHO) Expert Advisory Committee to examine the scientific, ethical, social and legal challenges associated with Human Genome editing. She was a member of the InterAcademy Partnership Working Group on Regenerative Medicine, nominated by INSA (2020–21). From 2021 to 2023, she also served as a member of the International Society for Stem Cell Research (ISSCR) Working Group on Undifferentiated Stem Cells and Pluripotency, the Task Force to Develop Standards for Stem Cell Research and other committees. Since 2021, she has been serving as a member of the Board of Reviewing Editors for the journal eLife.

In 2024, she was a speaker and panelist at the Reagan Udall Foundation meeting on Scientific Advancements in Gene Therapies.

== Honors and recognition ==
Inamdar was selected as a Young Associate of the Indian Academy of Sciences in 1999. The Department of Biotechnology (DBT) of the Government of India awarded her the National Bioscience Award for Career Development, She was awarded the National Women Bioscientist Award, in 2011. The Indian Academy of Sciences honoured her with elected fellowship in 2017. She was awarded the Dr Kalpana Chawla Award for Women Scientists and Engineers (Karnataka) 2017. She was also elected Fellow of the Indian National Science Academy in 2018 and the Prof. C.N.R. Rao Oration Award and the J C Bose National Fellowship in 2019. Under her leadership inStem was honored with the Confederation of Indian Industry (CII) Award for Excellence in Women in STEM in 2024. Prof. Inamdar is recognized as a Public Service Award Honoree by the International Society for Stem Cell Research (ISSCR) in 2025.

In 2025, she has recently been featured as one of the 10 Women Leaders and Influencers shaping policy matters in biotechnology and leading academic institutes by BioSpectrum and Harper's Bazaar India titled “The New Vanguard of STEM: 10 People to Look Out For” for driving innovation and excellence in the field of stem cell science.

== See also ==
- ARF1
- Angiogenesis
