= Maharani Gayatri Devi Girls' Public School =

Girls-only school private boarding school in Jaipur, Rajasthan, India

Maharani Gayatri Devi Public School
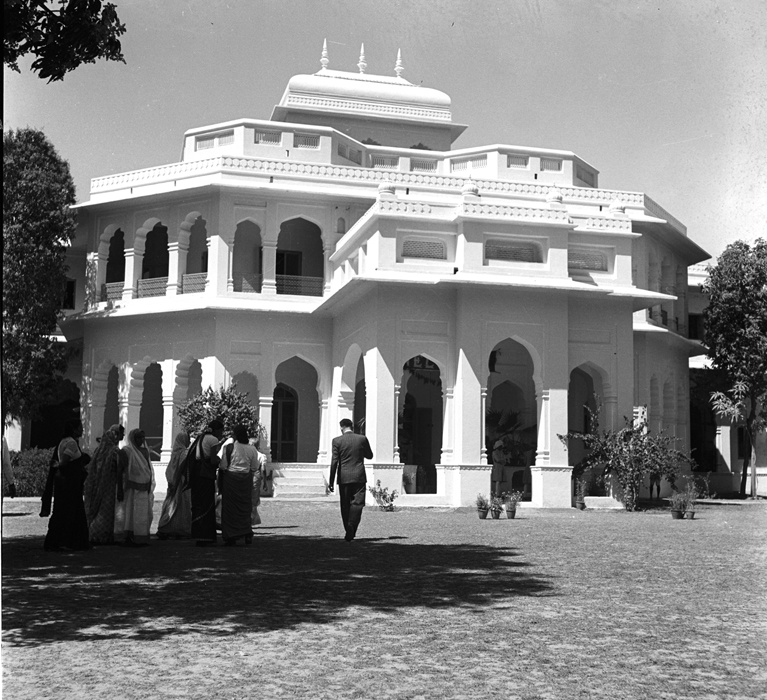
- The school building, c. 1946

Location
- Sawai Ram Singh Road near Ajmeri Gate; Jaipur, 302001, Rajasthan; India

Information
- Motto: Our utmost for the highest
- Established: 12 August 1943
- Affiliation: Central Board of Secondary Education (CBSE) and Cambridge IGCSE
- Website: www.mgdschooljaipur.com

Maharani Gayatri Devi Girls' School or MGD is located in Jaipur, India and was established by and named after Rajmata Gayatri Devi of Jaipur. It was the first all-girls school to be established in the state of Rajasthan.

== History ==
The school was founded on 12 August 1943. In the summer of 1940, the Maharaja of Jaipur Sawai Man Singh Bahadur brought home Princess Gayatri Devi, of Cooch Behar, as his bride. She was the daughter of the Maharaja and Maharani Indira Deviji, of Cooch Behar. Her concern for the education of the local court women led her and Bahadur to found the school. Bahadur ordered the Prime Minister Sir Mirza Ismail, and the Education and Finance Minister, Rao Bahadur Amarnath Atal, to allot land and plan the school. It started with 24 girls and Lilian G. Lutter as Principal on the lines of the British public school pattern.

MGD was the first girls' public school to be accepted as a member of the Public School Council of India' Conference (IPSC). In 1950, MGD became a center for the Cambridge Examination for Jaipur. In 1962 the school shifted to the Indian School Certificate Board.

The school follows the Central Board for Secondary Education CBSE curriculum. The founder principal of the school was Ms. L.G. Lutter. The principal of the school is Mrs. Archana S. Mankotia. The school celebrated its 50th anniversary in 2003 with a ceremony for the founder Rajmata Gayatri Devi of Jaipur., Shiv Kumari of Kotah is vice president of the school.

== School campus ==
The school is situated on the Sawai Man Singh Road, in the heart of the city and sprawls over 26 acres (110,000 m^{2}). Today it has over 3000 students from all parts of India of which 400 are resident on campus, studying from Classes I to XII.

The campus consists of buildings, gardens, lawns, sports fields, tennis courts, a stadium cum auditorium and a swimming pool. There are six boarding houses, each for age groups - Lillian Hurst, Ashiyana, Deepshikha, Maharani Indira Devi Bhawan, Rani Vidya Devi Bhawan, and the teacher's residence - Nivedita House.

== Notable alumnae ==
- Pamella Bordes – photographer and former Miss India
- Sandhya Mridul – actress
- Sminu Jindal - entrepreneur
- Krishnendra Kaur (Deepa) – former member of Lok Sabha
- Meira Kumar – Speaker of the Lok Sabha and presidential candidate for the Union of India from Indian National Congress, 2017
- Apurvi Chandela – international shooter
- Diya Kumari – Member of erstwhile royal family of Jaipur and Deputy Chief Minister of Rajasthan
