= Rajiv Memani =

Indian businessman

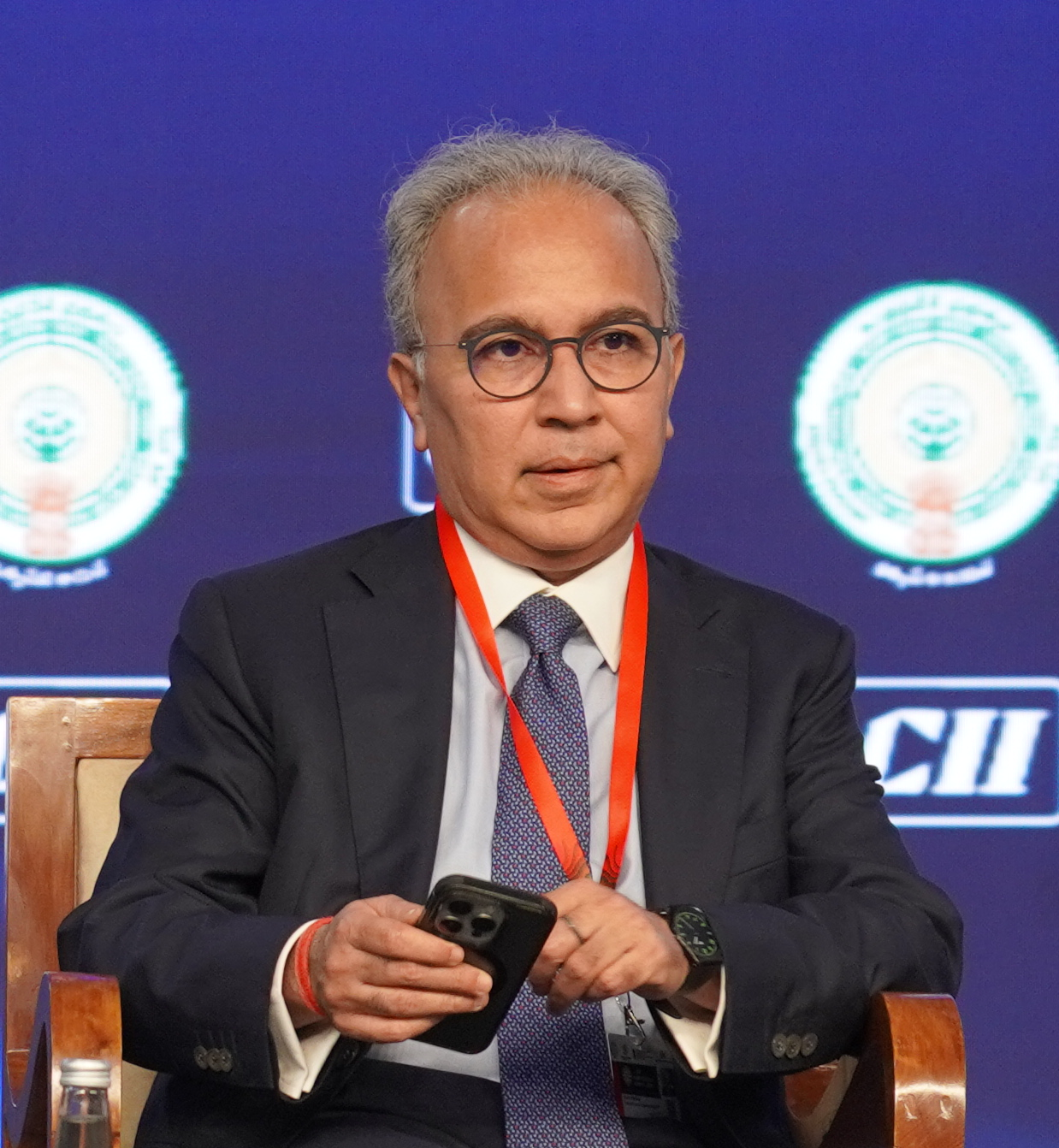
- Rajiv at CII Partnership Summit 2025, Visakhapatnam
- Born: 28 January 1968 (age 58)
- Education: Delhi Public School (DPS) R K Puram (1985); Shri Ram College of Commerce (SRCC), Delhi University (1988); Chartered Accountant (1991)
- Occupations: Regional Managing Partner of EY Africa India region, Chair – EY Growth Markets Council, Past President - CII, 2025-26
- Employer(s): EY, India

Rajiv Memani (born 28 January 1968) is the Regional Managing Partner of EY Africa India region, Chair – EY Growth Markets Council, Past President - CII, 2025-26

== Early life and education ==
Rajiv completed his schooling from the Delhi Public School (DPS) R K Puram in 1985. He received his Bachelor of Commerce (Hons) degree from Shri Ram College of Commerce (SRCC), Delhi University, in 1988 and completed his chartered accountancy in 1991.

== Career ==
Rajiv joined an India member-firm of EY Global in mid-1980s. He worked in the tax and assurance practices of an EY member firm in India. In 2004, he was appointed CEO and Regional Managing Partner of EY in India, succeeding his father to the role. In 2013, Rajiv was appointed on the Global Executive Board of EY as Chairman of the Global Growth Markets Council (GMC).

== Community Work ==
Rajiv has been a driving force behind EY Foundation, which is active in the areas of education, entrepreneurship for rural women and environment.

== Memberships and achievements ==
Rajiv served as the President (2025–26) of the Confederation of Indian Industry (CII), India’s largest and premier industry body. Over the past decade, Rajiv has actively contributed to public discourse on tax and policy reforms and has also been a member of several high-powered Government of India committees, including the Ministry of Finance task force that drafted the new Direct Tax Code in 2019.

Rajiv is the President of the Board of Him Jyoti School, an institution dedicated to providing quality education to underprivileged girls in Uttarakhand. He is also a Board member of the Indian Institute of Management (IIM), Sirmaur and a member of the governing council of KREA University. Rajiv has also been the driving force behind EY Foundation, which is active in the areas of education, entrepreneurship for rural women and environment.
