= Sminu Jindal =

Indian industrialist (born 1973)

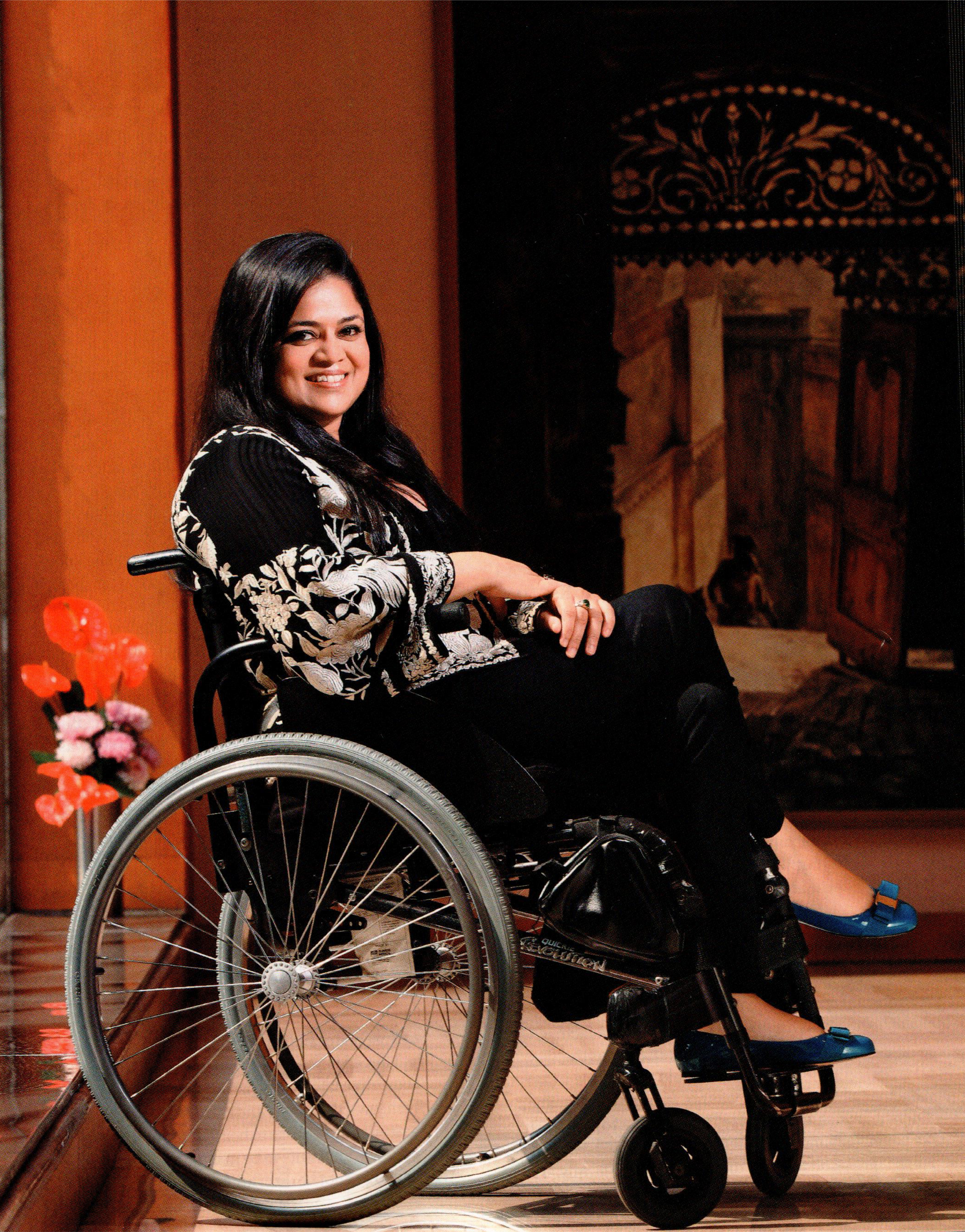
- Jindal in 2011
- Born: 18 January 1973 (age 53); Hisar, India
- Education: Maharani Gayatri Devi Girls' Public School; Presentation Convent Senior Secondary School; Shri Ram College of Commerce; Fore School of Management
- Occupation: Industrialist
- Spouse: Indresh Batra
- Children: Anav Batra & Arjan Batra
- Parent(s): PR Jindal & Arti Jindal

Sminu Jindal (born 18 January 1973) is an Indian industrialist. She is the managing director of Jindal SAW Limited and Founder-Chairperson of Svayam, an initiative of the Sminu Jindal Trust & India's leading accessibility rights organization. She currently also serves as the Chairperson of the CII India Business and Disability Network (CII IBDN). She married Mr. Indresh Batra in 2001, and they have two sons, Anav Batra and Arjan Batra. She belongs to the US$22 billion O.P. Jindal Group.

Jindal was appointed as the managing director of Jindal SAW Ltd. in February 2001. She also held the position of managing director of Hexa Tradex Ltd. from October 2011 to August 2016. She has been Chairperson of the Assocham National Council on Iron & Steel since 2007.

== Early life ==
Sminu studied at prestigious Maharani Gayatri Devi Girls' Public School in Jaipur, Rajasthan and Presentation Convent Senior Secondary School in New Delhi before graduating in commerce from Shri Ram College of Commerce (SRCC), New Delhi.

At the age of 11, she was involved in an accident while traveling from Jaipur to New Delhi, which resulted in her needing a wheelchair for the rest of her life.

== Business ==
Jindal joined Jindal SAW Limited as a management trainee (1 August 1992 to 30 June 1994) in one of its loss-making factories when she was 19. She was then promoted to Executive-Corporate Planning (1 July 1994 to 31 March 1995).

Jindal helped the company venture into new business areas including urban development, domestic transport, and logistics under the company's subsidiary Jindal ITF (JITF) Urban Infrastructure.

== Launch of the initiative "Svayam" by SJCT ==
In October 2000, SJCT launched its initiative 'Svayam' as a web-portal.

== Membership ==
She has been a Jury Member on the Committee for the National Awards for the Welfare of Persons with Disabilities, Govt. of India.

== Awards and honours ==
- Women Entrepreneur of the Year 2009 Award by FICCI Ladies Organisation (FLO)
- Young Global Leaders(YGL) 2009 by World Economic Forum
- National Tourism Award of Excellence jointly with ASI in 2009
- National Tourism Award 2011-12
- Sminu Jindal was tagged as 38th Most Powerful Women in India by Fortune India Magazine in 2011
- Asia-Pacific Enterprise Leadership Award (APELA) in the category of Social Service (2012)
- L'oreal Femina Women Award in 2014
- Global Youth Icon Awards 2014,
- GAATES Award of Recognition 2016
- Jindal has been featured in Books titled Corporate Divas, Why I failed?
