= Satyajit Mayor =

Indian biologist (Born: 1963)

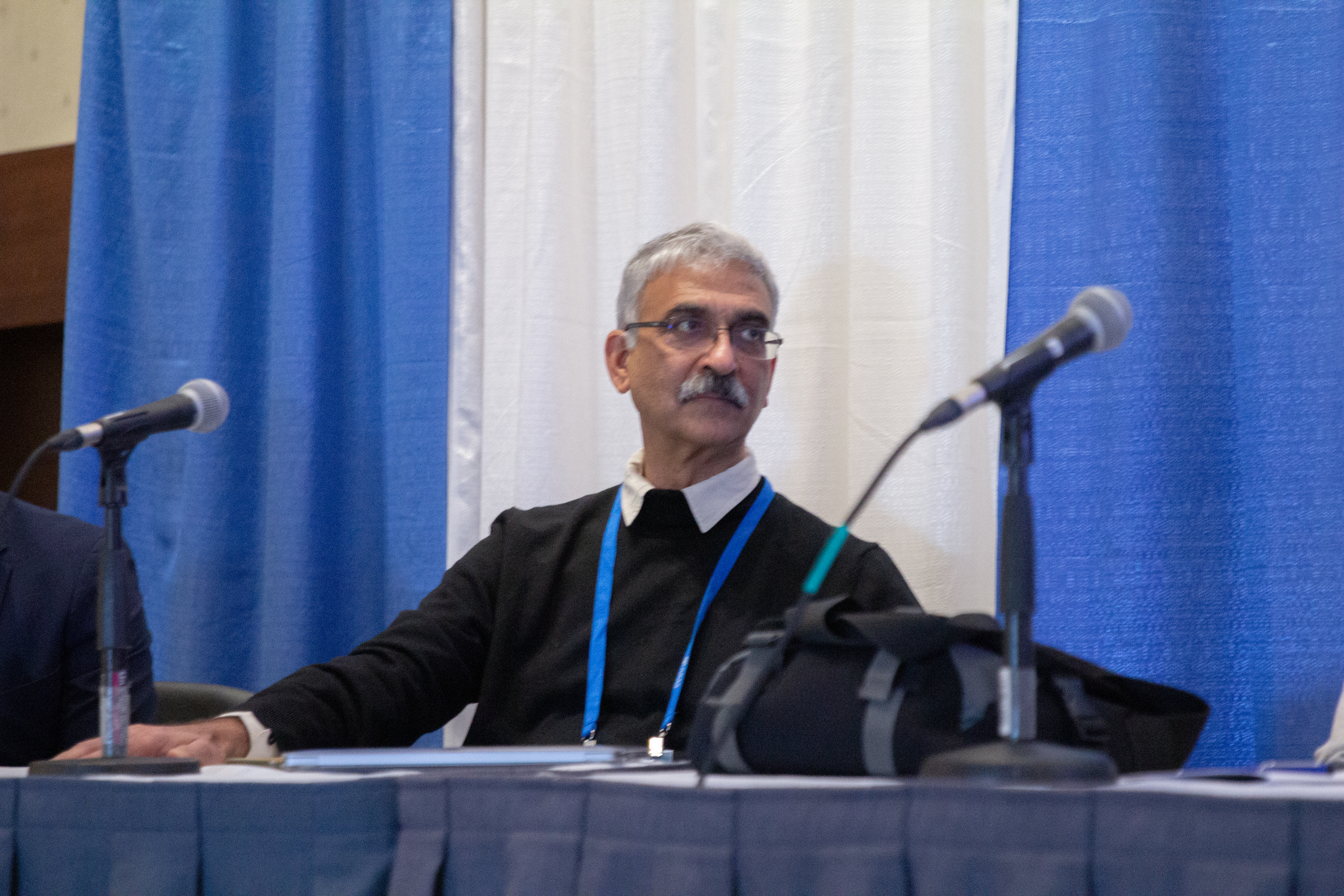
- Born: 26 January 1963 (age 63)
- Education: IIT Bombay; Rockefeller University
- Awards: Infosys Prize for Life Sciences (2012); JC Bose Fellowship, DST (2006-2016); Shanti Swarup Bhatnagar Award, CSIR,(2003)
- Scientific career
- Fields: Biology, Cell biology, Membrane Biology, Cell signaling
- Workplaces: National Centre for Biological Sciences, Bangalore
- Doctoral advisor: George A.M. Cross

Satyajit Mayor (born 1963) is an Indian biologist. Mayor is the former director of the Institute for Stem Cell Science and Regenerative Medicine (inStem) at Bangalore, which has a focus on the study of stem cell and regenerative biology and of the National Centre for Biological Sciences, Bangalore. Since 2024, Mayor is a Leverhulme International Professor at Warwick Medical School in the Centre for Mechanochemical Cell Biology.

In 2012, Mayor won the Infosys Prize for life sciences for his study of regulated cell surface organization and membrane dynamics.

== Education ==
Mayor studied chemistry at the Indian Institute of Technology Bombay and was awarded his PhD in life sciences from The Rockefeller University, New York. He worked as a postdoctoral fellow at Columbia University, where he developed tools to study the trafficking of membrane lipids and GPI-anchored proteins in mammalian cells using quantitative fluorescence microscopy.

== Research ==
Mayor started his laboratory at NCBS in 1995 following completion of his postdoctoral research at Columbia University.

"The broad aim of Prof Mayor's laboratory is to provide an understanding of the molecular mechanisms of endocytosis in metazoan cells, and study this phenomenon at many scales. At the molecular scale his group wants to uncover the molecular players in endocytic processes; at the mesoscopic scale research in his laboratory attempts to provide a physical description of cell membrane structure and organization process and its material properties; at the cellular scale the work is aimed at synthesizing a role for endocytosis in cellular signalling and cell surface homeostasis; at the scale of the tissue the group wishes to determine how control of endocytosis impinges on many developmental programs in tissue morphogenesis (http://www.ncbs.res.in/mayor)."

Professor Mayor is the recipient of several national and international awards such as the Wellcome Trust International Senior Research Fellowship, Swarnajayanti Fellowship, Shanti Swarup Bhatnagar Award, and the JC Bose Fellowship.

== Awards and honors ==
- Conferred as a Knight of the National Order of Merit by the President of the French Republic
- Asian Scientist 100, Asian Scientist, 2016
- Elected as Foreign Associate of the US National Academy of Sciences, 2015.
- Distinguished Alumnus of IIT Bombay, 2013
- Elected EMBO Fellow, 2013
- Infosys Prize for Life Sciences, 2012
- TWAS Prize in Biology, 2010
- EMBO Global Lecturer, 2010
- JC Bose Fellowship, DST, 2006–2011 (renewed till 2016).
- Shanti Swarup Bhatnagar Award, CSIR, 2003.
- Swarnajayanti Fellowship, DST, 2003–2008.
- Wellcome Trust International Senior Research Fellow (Biomedical Research, India), 1999–2004.
- Mizutani Foundation for Glycoscience Award, 2001
- Helen Hays Whitney Postdoctoral Fellowship, 1992–1995.
- The Rockefeller-Oxford Student Exchange Program Recipient, 1988.
- Lucille P. Markey Charitable Trust Graduate Fellowship, 1986–1991.
- Visiting Students Research Program Recipient (TIFR), 1984.
