= Shri Ram College of Commerce =

Undergraduate college for commerce and economics

- श्री राम कॉलेज ऑफ कॉमर्स
- Former name: Commercial College
- Motto: तमसो मा ज्योतिर्गमय
- Motto in English: Tamso Maa Jyotirgamaya (Lead us from darkness into light)
- Type: Co-ed College specializing in Commerce, Economics and Management
- Established: 1926 (100 years ago)
- Founders: Lala Chunnamal, Master Shiv Pershad and Sir Shri Ram
- Accreditation: NAAC: A++
- Academic affiliations: University of Delhi
- Chairman: Ajay S. Shriram
- Principal: Simrit Kaur
- Academic staff: 130
- Students: 3000
- Location: Maurice Nagar, North Delhi, 110007, Delhi, 110 007, India
- Campus: 16.5 Acres; Urban
- Language: Bilingual; English, Hindi
- Nicknames: SRCC, SRites
- Website: www.srcc.edu

Shri Ram College of Commerce (SRCC) is an Indian higher education institution in the fields of commerce, economics and business management. A constituent college of the University of Delhi, it was founded in 1926 by seven leading businessmen namely Lala Chunnamal, Master Shiv Pershad, Sir Shri Ram and others.

== History ==
The origin of the college is traced to 1920 when on the day of Basant Panchmi, seven leading businessmen namely Lala Chunnamal, Master Shiv Pershad, Sir Shri Ram and others established the Commercial Education Trust in Delhi. The Trust set up its first school in the same year under the name 'The Commercial School' at Charkhewalan in Delhi where it introduced a Post-Matriculation Diploma Programme in Commerce under the supervision of Mr. R. K. Kumar, who later became the first Principal of the Commercial College. The inauguration of the Commercial College paved the entry of commerce education in the University system of Delhi.

The first batch of students of the Commercial College was enrolled on the first floor of a 'Hall' opposite the St. James' Church at Kashmere Gate. The classes began with twelve students and four faculty members from a hired bungalow at 8, Darya Ganj, Delhi.

In 1926, the Commercial College became affiliated with the University of Delhi. Six years later, it was upgraded to the status of a Degree College and started awarding its graduates the B. A. (Pass) (Commerce Group) Degree of the University.

The College launched its annual magazine "Yamuna" in January 1928.

The B. A. (Honours) (Commerce Group) Degree was introduced in 1943. M. A. (Economics) course followed by the introduction of Master's degree in Commerce were introduced in 1948. In 1949, when B.Com. (Honours) was instituted in the University of Delhi, the College also started offering the same.

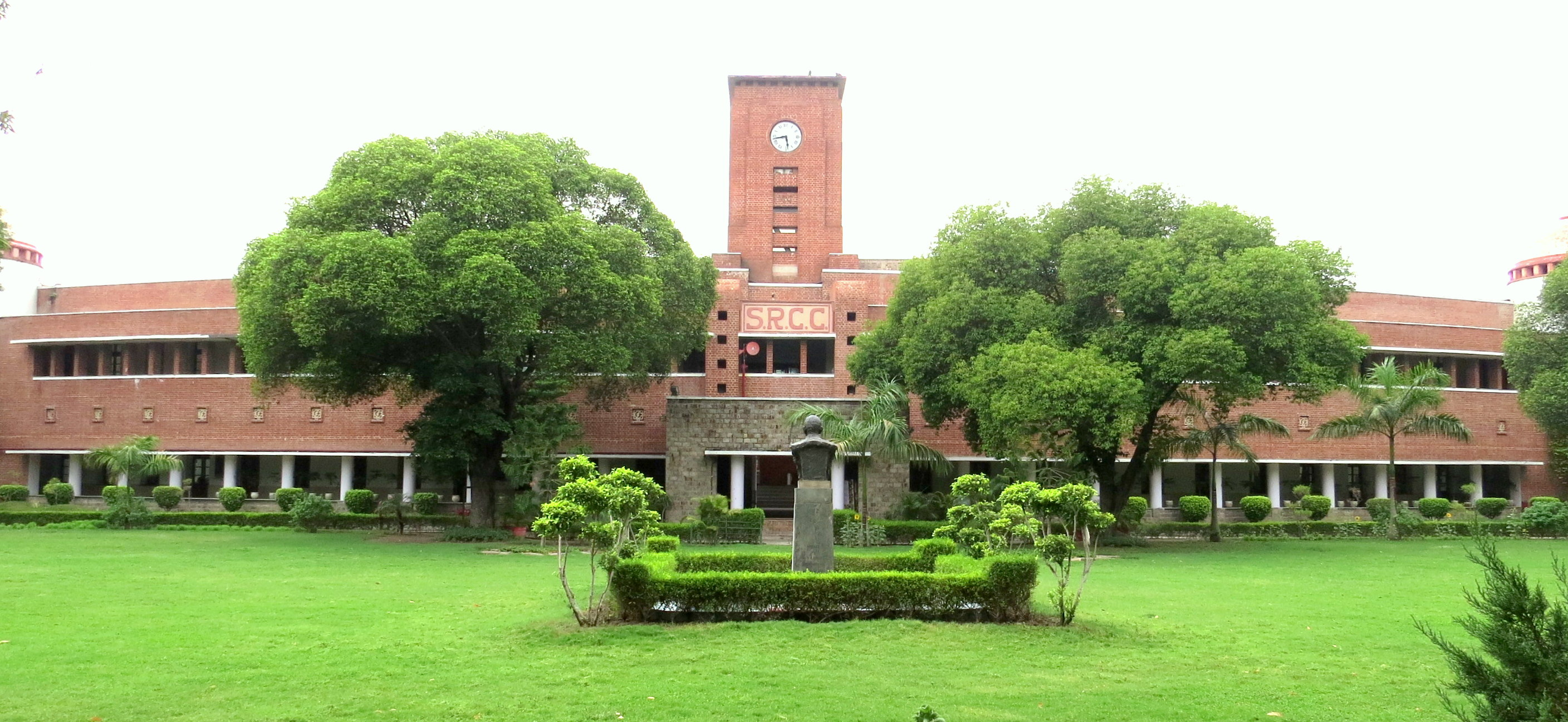
Facade of the College

In 1951, on the occasion of its Silver Jubilee, the Commercial College decided to specialize in the field of commerce and economics and hence rechristened itself as Shri Ram College of Commerce (SRCC) in recognition of the contribution made by its founder Sir Shri Ram. Three years later, in 1954, the College shifted completely to its present day campus in the North Campus, University of Delhi.

In 1957 when the College converted to a coeducational institution.

Finally, the B. A. (Honours) Economics course was introduced later in 1958. The inclusion of B. A. (Hons.) Economics rounded the academic number of the courses offered by Shri Ram College of Commerce at undergraduate level.

The 1960s was a period of infrastructural expansion for Shri Ram College of Commerce. In 1963-64, the Students’ Centre (now renamed as Shridhar Shriram Auditorium), Tutorial Blocks and the Girls’ Hostel Blocks were constructed. In the same year, the Swimming pool and the gymnasium were built under a Shramdaan Movement by the students. This made Shri Ram College of Commerce the first college in the University of Delhi to have a swimming pool. In 1967, the iconic bust of Sir Shri Ram was installed in the front lawns facing the College.

In the year 1968, SRCC launched "Business Analyst", its research journal dedicated to active dissemination and promotion of original and contemporary research in the area of business, management, economics, finance and governance.

The Girls Hostel was constructed in 1985, making Shri Ram College of Commerce the first amongst all co-educational colleges of the University of Delhi to have its own residential unit for its female students.

The Placement Cell, Shri Ram College of Commerce was established in 1996. In 1999, SRCC introduced its Post Graduate Diploma in Global Business Operations (PGDGBO), a unique self-financed PG Diploma course. The launch of PGDGBO rounded the total number of academic courses offered at Shri Ram College of Commerce since its inception.

== Governance ==
Shri Ram College of Commerce is governed by a Governing Body duly constituted under Ordinance XVIII of the DU Act, 1922. At present, the SRCC Governing Body is constituted as:

Name	Designation
Mr. Ajay S. Shriram	Chairperson, SRCC Governing Body
Prof. Madhu Vij	Treasurer, SRCC Governing Body
Prof. Simrit Kaur	Member Secretary (Principal, Shri Ram College of Commerce)
Mr. Vikram S. Shriram	Trust Representative
Justice A. K. Sikri	Trust Representative
Mr. Rajat Sharma	Trust Representative
Mr. Sunil Kant Munjal	Trust Representative
Ms. Abha Adams	Trust Representative
Mr. Sandeep Dinodia	Trust Representative
Mr. Navtej Singh Sarna	Trust Representative
Mr. Raian N, Karanjawala	Trust Representative
Prof. A. K. Singh	University Representative
Prof. Supriya Kar	University Representative
Ms. Renu Agarwal	College Teachers’ Representative
Ms. Nidhi Gupta	College Teachers’ Representative

== Academics ==
Shri Ram College of Commerce specializes in the disciplines of Commerce, Management and Economics. It offers:

1. Two programmes at the Undergraduate Level:

- B. A. (Hons.) Economics
- B. Com. (Hons.)

2. Three programmes at the Postgraduate Level:

- M. A. (Economics)
- M. Com.
- Post Graduate Diploma in Global Business Operations (PGDGBO)

== Admissions ==
Admissions to all Undergraduate (UG) Programs in Shri Ram College of Commerce are based on the scores obtained in CUET-UG (Common University Entrance Test, Undergraduate).

== Departments ==
Shri Ram College of Commerce has the following nine departments:

1. Department of Commerce
2. Department of Computer Science
3. Department of Economics
4. Department of Environmental Science
5. Department of English
6. Department of Hindi
7. Department of Mathematics
8. Department of Physical Science and Sports
9. Department of Political Science

== Accreditation and ranking ==
Shri Ram College of Commerce has been serving educational needs in commerce and economics of industries for more than eight decades.

Shri Ram College of Commerce was accredited "A+" by National Assessment and Accreditation Council(NAAC) in 2016 with a CGPA of 3.65 in its first cycle of Assessment and Accreditation. This was then the highest score received by any college of the University of Delhi in 2016 with SRCC emerging the best college. It was graded "A++" with a score of 3.75 by NAAC in the second cycle of assessment and accreditation in 2023.

Shri Ram College of Commerce was ranked the Number One Commerce College in India by India Today in 2023. It was also ranked as the Best College in Commerce in 2023 by Open Magazine. Outlook ICARE also ranked SRCC as the Best Commerce College in India at Rank 1 in the Outlook ICare Rankings 2023.

It is ranked 11th in the India Rankings 2023 by the National Institutional Ranking Framework (NIRF) in the category of Colleges.

== Student societies at SRCC ==
SRCC has over fifty (50) functional student societies, a few of which are:

1. The Students' Union, SRCC
2. Enactus Shri Ram College of Commerce
3. The Economics Society, SRCC
4. The Finance and Investment Cell, SRCC
5. The Commerce Society, SRCC
6. Shri Ram Consulting and Research Centre, SRCC
7. Click : The Film and Photography Society, SRCC
8. D-Street, SRCC
9. The Fine Arts Society, SRCC
10. The English Literary Society, SRCC
11. The Hindi Sahitya Sabha, SRCC
12. The History and Political Society, SRCC
13. Shri Ram Consulting and Research Centre
14. The Debating Society, SRCC
15. The Dramatic Society, SRCC
16. Kutumb - Cultural society, SRCC
17. The Computers and Mathematics Society, SRCC
18. Quiz Society, SRCC
19. Rotaract Club, SRCC

== Notable alumni ==
A few notable alumni of SRCC include:

=== Politics ===
- Arun Jaitley, Former Union Minister of Finance and Minister of Corporate Affairs, Government of India
- Lalit Suri, Member of Parliament (2002-2006) and Chairman, Bharat Hotels chain (now LaLIT)
- Bingu wa Mutharika, President of Malawi (2004-2012)
- Jagdish Mukhi, Former Governor of Assam and Governor of Nagaland
- Jitin Prasada, Minister of Public Works Department, Government of Uttar Pradesh
- Jaivardhan Singh, Member of Legislative Assembly, Madhya Pradesh
- Vijay Goel, former Minister of State for Parliamentary Affairs and Statistic and Implementation, Government of India
- Vijender Gupta, Member of Legislative Assembly, Delhi
- Vijay Jolly, All India Incharge & Prabhari of Tripura State, BJP
- N. D. Gupta, Member of Parliament Rajya Sabha Aam Aadmi Party

=== Judiciary ===
- Justice Arjan Kumar Sikri, Retired Judge, Supreme Court of India
- Justice Rohinton Fali Nariman, Retired Judge, Supreme Court of India
- Justice Ajay Kumar Tripathi, Retired Chief Justice of Chhattisgarh High Court and former Judicial Member of the Lokpal of India
- Justice Ajay Kumar Mittal, Former Chief Justice of Madhya Pradesh High Court and Meghalaya High Court

=== Corporate ===
- Analjit Singh, Founder Chairman, Max India and Founder, Leeu Collection
- Abhijit Bhaduri, Eminent Author and Former Chief Learning Officer, Wipro
- Anshu Jain, Former President of Cantor Fitzgerald and Former Co-CEO of Deutsche Bank
- Anil Rai Gupta, Chairman and Managing Director, Havells India
- Manish Maheshwari, Former Head of Twitter India and Former CEO-Digital of Network18
- Pramod Bhasin, Former President and CEO of Genpact
- Rajiv Memani, Chairman, EY Global Growth Markets Council (GMC), & Regional Managing Partner of EY India
- Ruchir Sharma, Head, Rockefeller Capital Management
- Sminu Jindal, Managing Director, Jindal SAW Limited and Founder-Chairperson of Svayam
- Vijay Rekhi, Former MD and President, United Spirits Limited

=== Academics ===
- Rajan Saxena, Former Vice Chancellor, NMIMS and Padma Shri awardee
- Ashok Gulati, Indian Agricultural Economist

=== Media and entertainment ===
- Gulshan Grover, eminent actor
- Nimrat Kaur, actress
- Rakeysh Omprakash Mehra, Director, "Rang De Basanti"
- Rajat Sharma, Founder Chairman and Editor in Chief, India TV
- Surender Sharma, Eminent Indian poet, writer and humorist and Padma Shri awardee
- Shiv Khera, Author of "You can win"
- Vipin Handa, Indian film director producer, industrialist and television personality

=== Bureaucracy ===
- Bhim Sain Bassi, Former Member, UPSC and Former Commissioner, Delhi Police
- Lieutenant General Rajan Bakhshi, General Officer Commanding in Chief of the Central Command
- Navtej Singh Sarna, Indian author-columnist, diplomat and former Indian Ambassador to the United States
- Sanjeev Sanyal, Member of the Economic Advisory Council to the Prime Minister of India and Eminent Author

=== Fashion ===
- Rajesh Pratap Singh, Prominent Fashion Designer

== Infrastructure ==
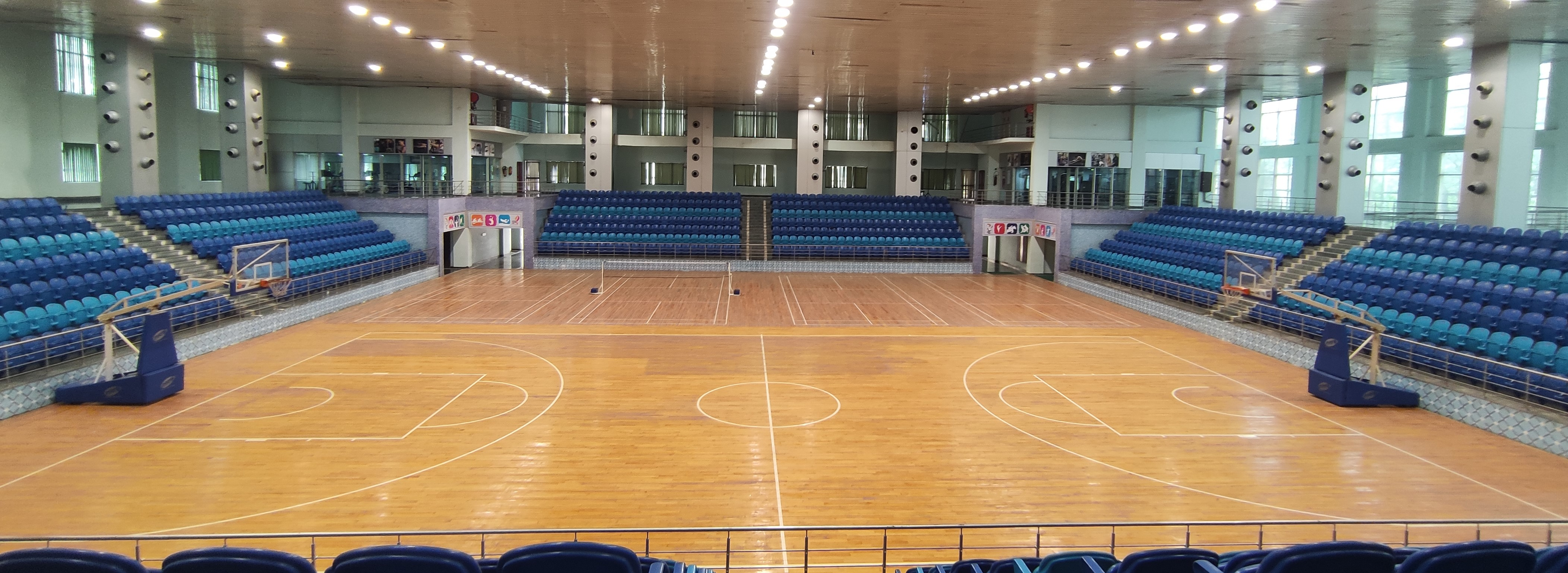
Arun Jaitley Sports Complex

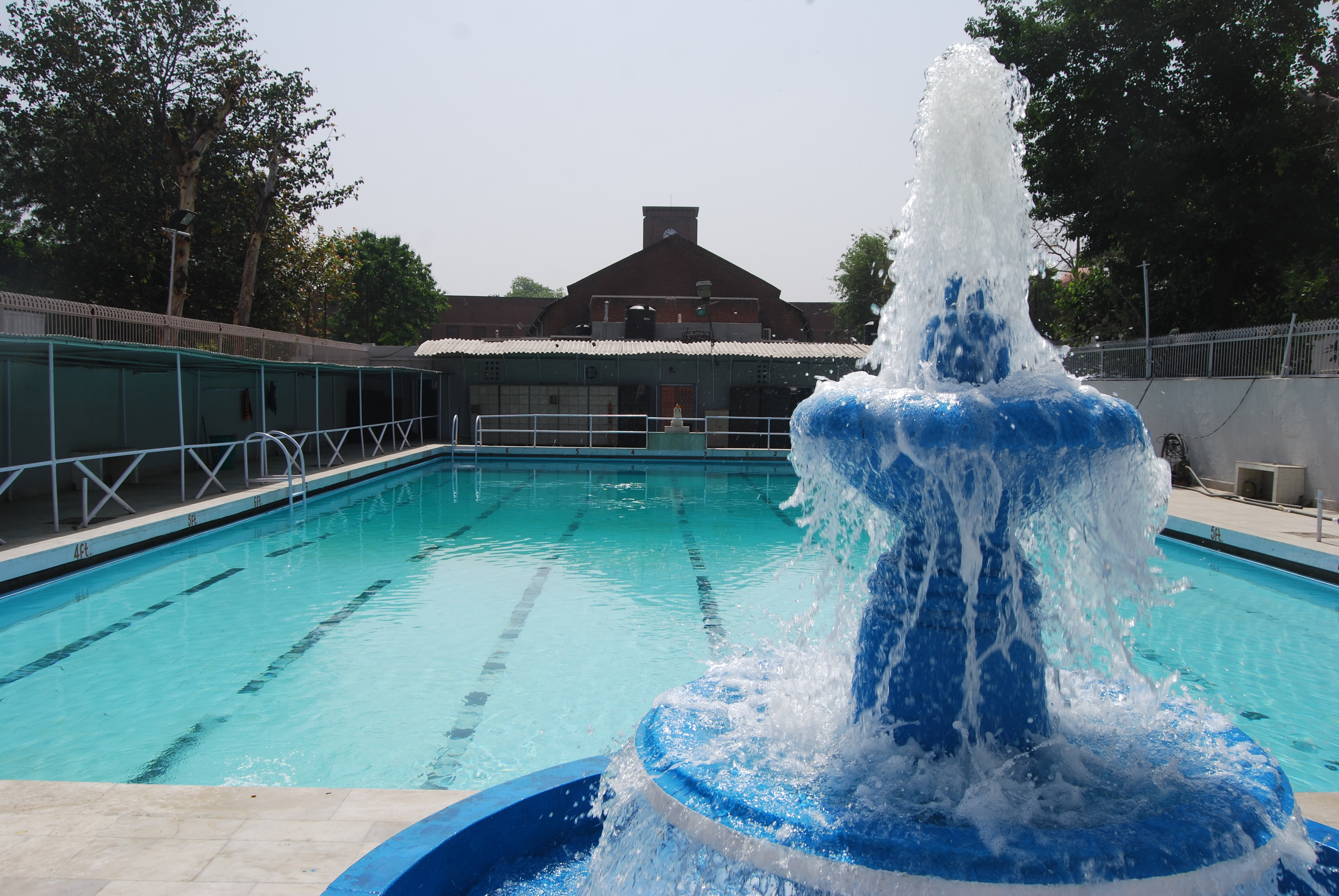
Swimming Pool

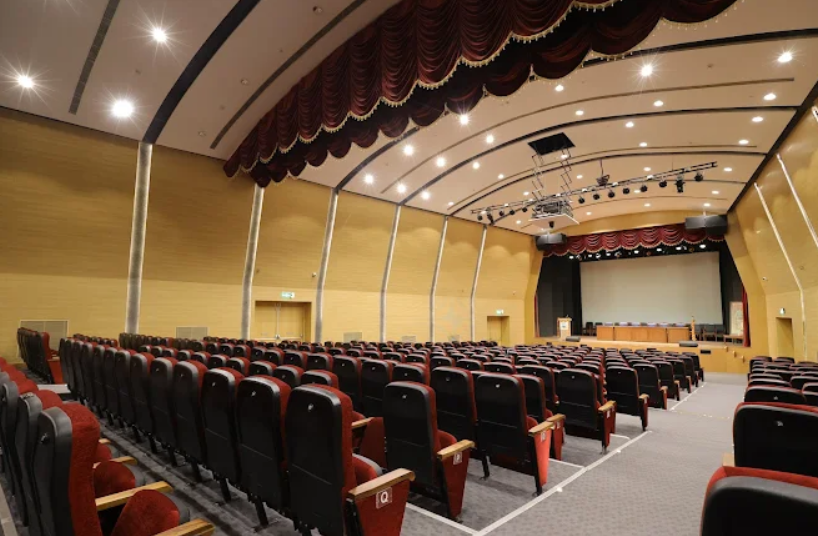
Shridhar Shriram Auditorium

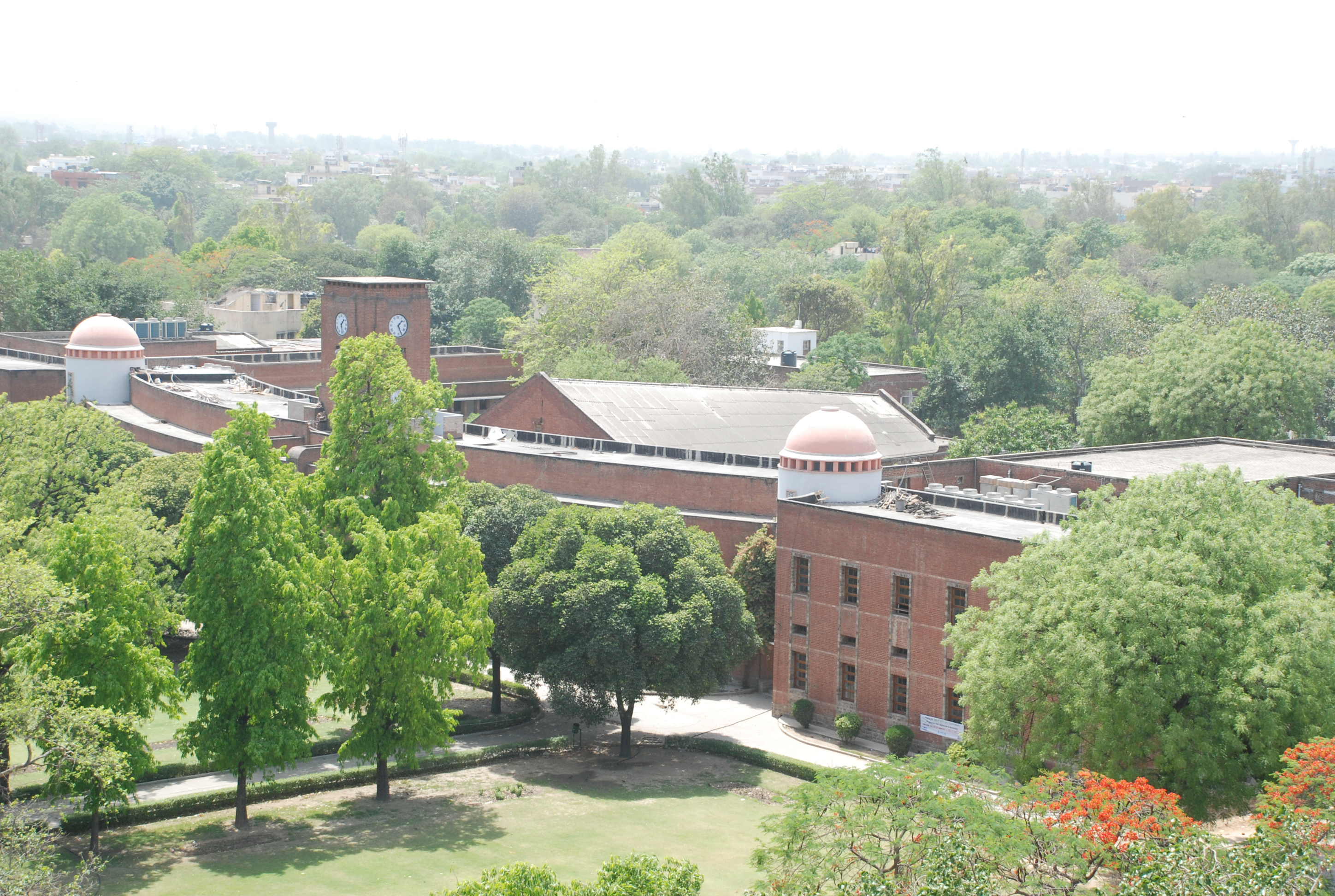
Drone View
