= Ajay S. Shriram =

Indian businessman

Ajay S. Shriram is chairman and Sr. Managing Director of DCM Shriram Ltd. and chairman of its subsidiary company, Shriram Bioseed Ventures Ltd. Post his schooling from The Doon School, Dehradun (India), Shriram obtained a bachelor's degree in commerce from Sydenham College, Bombay. He attended various training & management development programs in India & overseas and participated in the “Programme for Management Development” (PMD) at the Harvard Business School, Boston, USA.

Following his education at The Doon School, Dehradun (India), Shriram obtained a bachelor's degree in commerce from Sydenham College, Bombay. He attended various training & management development programs in India & overseas and participated in the “Programme for Management Development” (PMD) at the Harvard Business School, Boston, USA.

Shriram was the President, Confederation of Indian Industry (CII) for 2014-15. He is also the Chairman of the Governing Body of Shri Ram College of Commerce (SRCC) and a Trustee of SOS Children's Villages of India.

Shriram has been recently conferred with Degree of Doctor of Letters (Honoris Causa) by BML Munjal University.

Apart from being a Chairman or Member of various Committees in CII in the past, he has also held the following positions:

1. President & Chairman of International Fertilizer Industry Association, Paris (2009–11)

2. Chairman, Agriculture Committee, International Fertilizer Industry Association, Paris (2003–05)

3. Chairman, Fertilizer Association of India (2000–02)

4. Member, Asian Food & Agribusiness Advisory Board, Asia, Rabobank International (2006–09)

5. Member, Managing Committee, PHD Chamber of Commerce (to 2006)

6. President, Doon School Old Boys Society (2000–02) 7. Member, Board of Governors, The Doon School, Dehradun (2002–08).

8. Treasurer, Board of Governors, The Doon School, Dehradun (2004–08).

9. Member, Board of Governors, Indian Institute of Management, Lucknow (2002–07)

10. Member, Board of Governors, Indian Institute of Foreign Trade (2003–06).

11. Chairman, Delhi Chapter, Young Presidents’ Organisation (1995–96).

12. President, Alkali Manufacturers’ Association (1995–97)

13. President, Northern Indian Textile Mill Association (1992–93)

Shriram is also the chairman of the board for Indian Institute of Management, Sirmaur & Shri Ram College of Commerce (SRCC) and a trustee of SOS Children Villages of India.

Shriram has two sons.
