= Jürgen Fitschen =

German banker (born 1948)

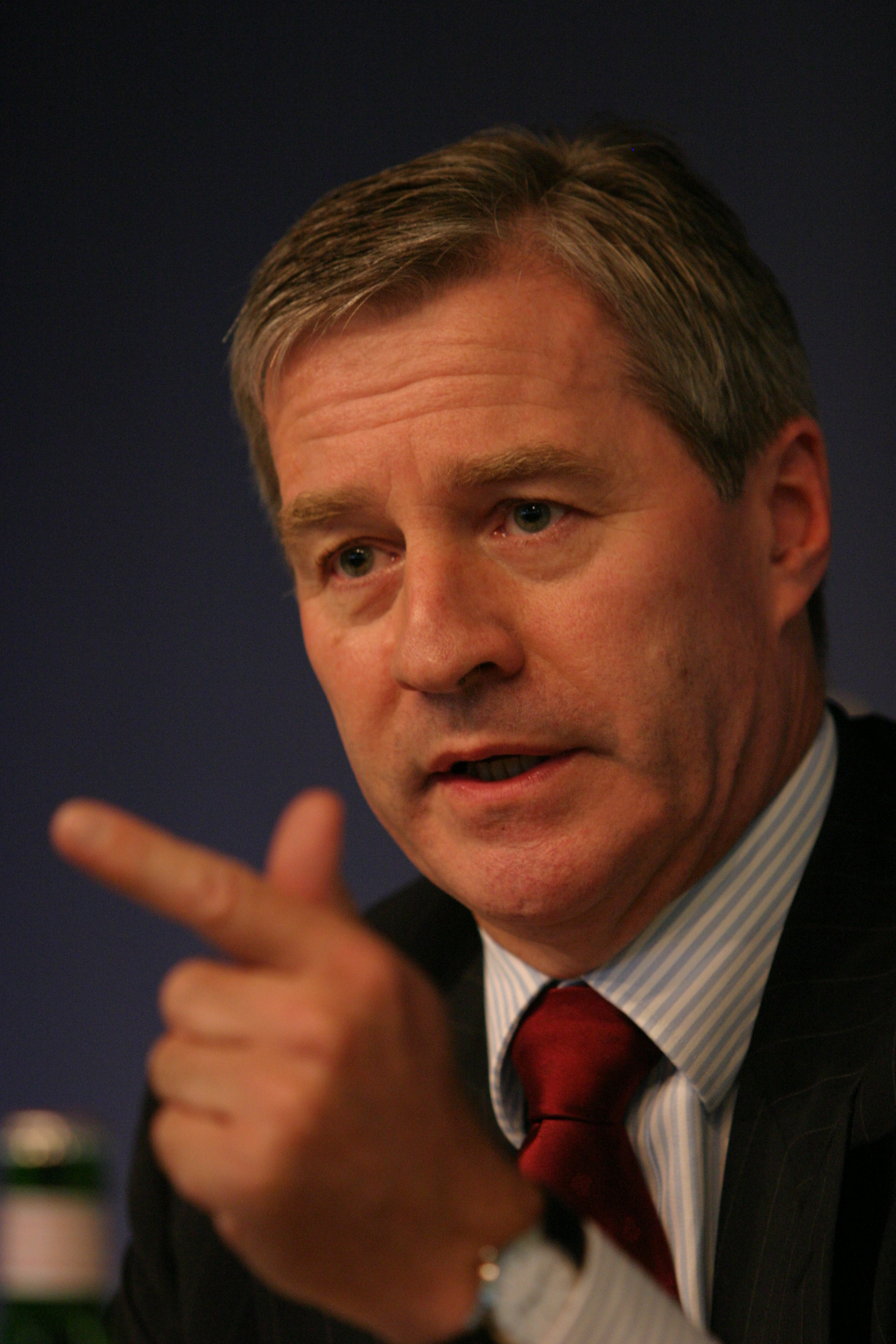
- Fitschen in 2004
- Born: 1 September 1948 (age 78)
- Occupation: Banker
- Years active: 1975–2016
- Known for: Co-CEO Deutsche Bank

Jürgen Fitschen (born 1 September 1948 in Harsefeld, Germany), sometimes rendered Juergen Fitschen in English, is a German banker who served as co-CEO of Deutsche Bank from 2012 to 2016. He served alongside Anshu Jain until 2015 and John Cryan from 2015. He was president of the Association of German Banks from 2013 to 2016.

== Education ==
Fitschen went to school at Athenaeum Stade, then he studied Economics and Business Administration at the University of Hamburg and graduated in 1975 with a master's degree in Business Administration.

== Career ==
=== Citibank, 1975–1987 ===
From 1975 to 1987, Fitschen worked at Citibank in various positions in Hamburg and Frankfurt am Main. In 1983, he was appointed member of Citibank’s Executive Committee Germany.

=== Deutsche Bank, 1987–2016 ===
After joining Deutsche Bank in 1987, Fitschen held executive positions in Thailand, Japan and Singapore, before becoming a member of the Global Corporates and Institutions Divisional Board in 1997, based in Frankfurt. A year later he joined the newly designed Global Corporates and Institutions division, based in London. In 2001 he was appointed to Deutsche Bank Group Board of Managing Directors where he was responsible for the Corporate and Investment divisions of the bank.

Fitschen first became a member of Deutsche Bank’s Group Executive Committee in 2002. In 2005 he was appointed Head of the newly established Regional Management team worldwide and CEO Germany, based in Frankfurt. As CEO Germany he also served as Chairman of the Management Committee Germany. In these capacities Fitschen joined the Deutsche Bank Management Board in 2009.

In 2011, Deutsche Bank announced that Anshu Jain and Fitschen would share chief executive duties at Deutsche Bank by 2012.

In December 2012, Fitschen was under investigation for alleged sales tax evasion, which occurred in 2009. After a raid by over 500 police officials and tax inspectors, Fitschen called the minister-president of the German state of Hesse, Volker Bouffier, complaining about the raid, saying that the incident damaged the reputation of the largest German lender.

In 2013, Deutsche Bank extended Fitschen’s contract by two years. By 2014, his compensation was at 6.66 million euros.

In 2014, the Munich prosecutor’s office filed charges of attempted trial fraud against Fitschen and several former bank leaders, accusing them of colluding to give false testimony in a long-running lawsuit over the collapse of Kirch Group, bank client Leo Kirch’s media conglomerate. By 2016, Fitschen and the others were acquitted.

Following his departure as Co-CEO, Fitschen continued to work for Deutsche Bank, concentrating on the German and Asian businesses, and supporting the bank with his contacts with key corporate clients.

== Other activities ==
=== Corporate boards ===
- ESG Book, Member of the Advisory Board (since 2021)
- Schott AG, Member of the Supervisory Board (since 2012)
- Metro AG, Member of the Supervisory Board (since 2008)
- Vonovia, Chair of the Supervisory Board (2018–2023)
- Ceconomy, Chair of the Supervisory Board (2017–2020)
- Kuehne + Nagel International AG, Member of the Board of Directors (2008–2019)
- ESG Book, Member of the Advisory Board (since 2021)[12]
- Schott AG, Member of the Supervisory Board (since 2012)[13]
- Metro AG, Member of the Supervisory Board (since 2008)[14]
- Vonovia, Chair of the Supervisory Board (2018–2023)[15]
- Ceconomy, Chair of the Supervisory Board (2017–2020)[16]
- Kuehne + Nagel International AG, Member of the Board of Directors (2008–2019)[17][18]
- ESG Book, Member of the Advisory Board (since 2021)[12]
- Schott AG, Member of the Supervisory Board (since 2012)[13]
- Metro AG, Member of the Supervisory Board (since 2008)[14]
- Vonovia, Chair of the Supervisory Board (2018–2023)[15]
- Ceconomy, Chair of the Supervisory Board (2017–2020)[16]
- Kuehne + Nagel International AG, Member of the Board of Directors (2008–2019)[17][18]
- Thesauros Finance AG, Member of the Supervisory Board.

=== Non-profit organizations ===
- Trilateral Commission, Member of the European Group
