= Nils Ole Oermann =

German academic and business ethicist

- Born: 1973 (age 52–53); Bielefeld, West Germany

Nils Ole Oermann is a German academic and business ethicist.

== Education and academic career ==
At the University of Leipzig, Oermann received his master's degree in Protestant theology (Dipl. theol) in 1997 after studying theology, law, history and philosophy there and at Münster (Germany) for four years. In 1996, he obtained his master's degree (M.St.) and his D.Phil. in 1998 as he was a Rhodes Scholar at Christ Church, Oxford. His doctoral thesis was on colonial history. In 2013 he was appointed by the Rhodes Trust as its national secretary administering the Rhodes Scholarship for German nationals in Oxford.

After his Mission, Church and State Relations in South West Africa under German Rule: 1884-1915 work was published, the University of Leipzig (Germany) awarded Oermann a second doctorate in theology in 1999 for his public ecclesiastical law thesis.

He studied economics, international relations and ethics at Harvard University as a McCloy scholar (2001–2003) eventually leading to his Master in Public Administration (MPA). A year later, at Hamburg High Court, Oermann passed his first state examination in law.

Oermann finished his Habilitation in 2007 based on his postdoctoral research at Harvard with Jeffrey Sachs, Samuel Huntington and Noam Chomsky of the Massachusetts Institute of Technology. Richard Schröder supervised Oermann's Habilitation thesis. In 2009 Oermann wrote a major biography of Albert Schweitzer published in German (4th ed., 2013) and in English by Oxford University Press (2016), as well as a leading introductory volume on business ethics for the series C.H.Beck Wissen (2nd ed., 2018).

He was the co-head of the Program on Religion, Politics and Economics at the Humboldt-University in Berlin from 2007 to 2018.

In 2009 he was appointed full Professor of Ethics specializing in sustainability and sustainable economics at the Leuphana University of Lüneburg (Germany). He was also the vice-president of his university from 2010 to 2012. He was appointed as Director of the Institute for Ethics and Transdisciplinary Sustainability Research at Lüneburg University.

In 2010 he began to teach business ethics at the University of St. Gallen (Switzerland) as a visiting professor which he still does and he is an Associate Faculty Member at the University of Oxford since 2018

== Non-academic career ==
In 1999 he started work as a management consultant for Boston Consulting Group in New Zealand and Australia before starting his Harvard MPA in 2001.

Oermann was a personal advisor and speechwriter for Wolfgang Schäuble from 2002 to 2019, a leading politician of the Christian Democratic Union party in Germany. Oermann worked in Schäuble's office in the German Bundestag from 2002 to 2004 mainly on foreign and European policy.

From 2004 to 2007 with Horst Köhler, Oermann accepted a similar position as his personal adviser while Köhler was at the time President of the Federal Republic of Germany; and whom he still supports to this day. When Wolfgang Schäuble became Minister of the Interior and Homeland Security, Oermann returned to work for him in 2007 helping to set up the first German Conference on Islam. As Schäuble's adviser in the Ministry of Finance Oermann worked on issues like digitalization, European policy and economics for eight years (2009 to 2017).

Oermann also serves as an adviser to German DAX 30 corporations boards in the wake of the banking crisis and during the current ”Dieselgate” scandal.

In 2015 Oermann was appointed co-editor at the Theologische Literaturzeitung, the oldest international review journal in theology. He sits on the board of the Martin Luther Foundation as well as the Haniel Foundation He serves his home parish (Schäplitz, Altmark) as an ordained Lutheran pastor.

== Publications ==
Oermann has written a number of books in English and German, for both academic and general audiences, on a range of topics.

- Mission, Church and State Relations in South West Africa under German Rule: 1884-1915. Stuttgart, Germany: Franz Steiner Verlag. 1999. ISBN 978-3515075787.
- Anständig Geld verdienen? Protestantische Wirtschaftsethik unter den Bedingungen globaler Märkte. Gütersloh, Germany: Gütersloher Verlagshaus. 2007. ISBN 3-579-08034-2.
- Albert Schweitzer (1875-1965): Eine Biographie. Munich, Germany: C. H. Beck. 4th ed. 2013. ISBN 978-3-406-59127-3.
- Der fröhliche Sisyphos: Für Wolfgang Schäuble. (with Bruno Kahl, Markus Kerber and Johannes Zachhuber as co-editors). Freiburg, Germany: Herder. 2012. ISBN 978-3-45130663-1.
- Der Euro: eine Karriere? Für Horst Köhler. Freiburg, Germany: Herder. 2012. ISBN 978-3-45130762-1.
- Tod eines Investmentbankers: Eine Sittengeschichte der Finanzbranche. Freiburg, Germany: Herder. 2013. ISBN 978-3-451-30676-1. Published as paperback in 2018.
- Der weiße Ovambo: Ein deutsch-afrikanisches Jahrhundertleben. Freiburg, Germany: Herder. 2014. ISBN 978-3451309205.
- Wirtschaftsethik: Vom freien Markt bis zur Share Economy. Munich, Germany: C. H. Beck. 2nd ed. 2018. ISBN 978-3-406-67549-2.
- Albert Schweitzer: A Biography. Oxford: Oxford University Press. 2016. ISBN 978-0198784227.
- Zum Westkaffee bei Margot Honecker. Hamburg, Germany: Hoffmann und Campe. 2016. ISBN 978-3-455-50425-5.
- Wirtschaftskriege. Geschichte und Gegenwart. (with Hans-Jürgen Wolff). Freiburg, Germany: Herder. 2019. ISBN 978-3451384202.
