= Wildlife Conservation Trust =

Indian not-for-profit organisation

- Formation: 2002
- Founder: Hemendra Kothari
- Type: Non-governmental organization
- Purpose: Wildlife Conservation
- Headquarters: Mumbai
- Location: India
- Leader: Dr. Anish Andheria
- Website: https://www.wildlifeconservationtrust.org/

Wildlife Conservation Trust (WCT) is an Indian not-for-profit organisation based in Mumbai which was registered in 2002. WCT currently works in and around 160 protected areas across 23 states in India and works closely with government bodies, corporates, communities and local NGOs through funding and technical support, knowledge partnering and consultancy.

WCT's core areas of work focus on application of conservation methodologies on the ground; conservation research; understanding behaviour of people who live in and around forests to understand the inter-relation between them and the natural ecosystems; human-wildlife interface management; building capacity of the forest department in wildlife law enforcement and forensics; conservation education; livelihoods; health of frontline forest staff and road ecology.

== History ==
WCT was registered in the year 2002. For the first seven years it operated as a family trust, making donations to various tiger reserves to strengthen protection of those parks. In September 2009, an office was set up and subject matter experts were hired to run on-ground projects.

== Members ==
Hemendra Kothari is the Founder, Chairman and Trustee of the Wildlife Conservation Trust and the Hemendra Kothari Foundation. He is the former President of the Bombay Stock Exchange and founded DSP Financial Consultants Limited which later became DSP Merrill Lynch Ltd. He is currently the Chairman of DSP Investment Managers Private Limited. Dr. Anish Andheria, a Carl Zeiss Conservation Awardee is the President of the Wildlife Conservation Trust. He is a large carnivore biologist and a wildlife photographer of repute. Hemendra Kothari, Bittu Sahgal, Aditi Kothari Desai and Shuchi Kothari are the trustees of WCT. The advisory board of WCT comprises Mr. Subramaniam Ramodarai, Naina Lal Kidwai, Amit Chandra, Prashant Trivedi, Dereck Joubert, Thomas Kaplan, Alok Kshirsagar and Anshu Jain.

== WCT's Work ==
=== Conservation Research ===
WCT’s Conservation Research division executes on-ground activities mainly in the Central Indian Landscape to collect scientific data. WCT’s wildlife biologists are engaged in monitoring tigers outside Protected Areas and undertake camera trapping to assist the Forest Department to estimate the number of tigers and lesser known species both within and outside Protected Areas. WCT’s intensive studies on genetics and landscape ecology have provided substantial evidence for the need to safeguard corridors and forest patches outside the Protected Areas for the long-term survival of tigers and their prey. Apart from monitoring tigers, the division is also engaged in Eurasian otter ecology, hydrology, Indian pangolin ecology, and large carnivore distribution and occupancy studies in central India and the Western Ghats.

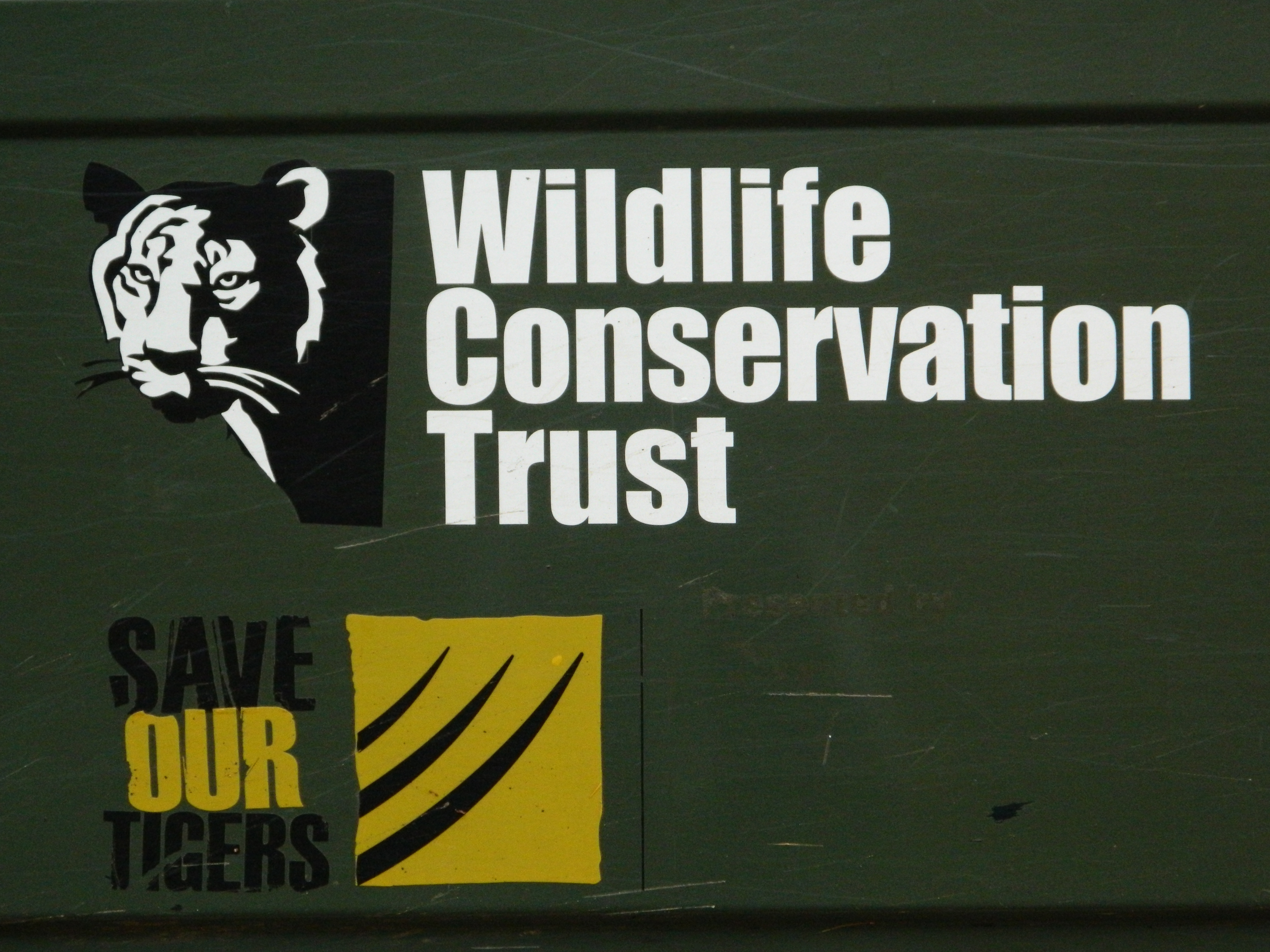
Wildlife Conservation Trust - Save Our Tigers

=== Conservation Behaviour ===
WCT’s Conservation Behaviour division undertakes in-depth studies that help chart evidence-driven interventions for community engagement in conservation. Using a multi-disciplinary framework, including economics, psychology, and sociology, the team evaluates and compares existing policies and practices, assesses their impact, and drafts white papers that suggest optimal measures grounded in contemporary public policy design models. WCT has partnered with Google Research India on its AI for Social Good research programme for predicting human-wildlife conflict in the state of Maharashtra using AI.

=== Road Ecology ===
WCT’s Road Ecology division studies linear infrastructure projects and undertakes policy-level interventions for the creation of mitigation measures needed to minimise damage to wildlife and natural habitats from such projects.

=== Conservation Dogs Unit ===
The Conservation Dogs Unit (CDU) comprises, at the moment, four specially trained working dogs to carry out varied tasks related to detection of target species or indirect evidences left behind by wildlife or wildlife poachers, and a well-trained staff which works in tandem with these dogs. The olfactory capabilities of dogs aid in ongoing conservation efforts and investigations. The CDU assists other verticals of WCT in human-wildlife interface management, conservation research, road ecology surveys, disease surveillance, and wildlife law enforcement. The CDU also assists Maharashtra and Madhya Pradesh Forest Departments on request.

=== Health ===
Lack of access to affordable quality healthcare for frontline forest staff, coupled with the remoteness of their work place, is an area of grave concern. WCT’s Health division has designed the ‘Caring for Conservators’ programme and Trauma Management Training to extend expert clinical healthcare to frontline forest staff. WCT works with state health departments to develop strategies aimed to improve access to primary health care facilities for forest staff working in Protected Areas.

=== Freshwater Ecosystems ===
WCT, through its Riverine Ecosystems And Livelihoods (REAL) Programme and Programme Makara, is conducting a long-term study on the ecology of the endangered Ganges river dolphin and the critically endangered gharial, and the impact of capture fisheries and other human activities on the riverine ecosystems in the Gangetic Plains and central India. WCT is working closely with several communities, state Forest Departments and other government agencies, NGOs, organisations, and individuals on the ground.

=== Important positions held by WCT ===
- The advisory board, Global Tiger Forum
- Member, National Tiger Conservation Authority
- State Boards of Wildlife for the following states - Maharashtra, Madhya Pradesh, Rajasthan, and Jammu and Kashmir
- Executive Committee of the Gujarat State Lion Conservation Society (GLCS)
- Executive Committee of the Madhya Pradesh Tiger Foundation Society
- Organising Committee of the Indian Climate Collaborative
- Member of Maharashtra Coastal Zone Management Authority
- Member of International Union for Conservation of Nature (IUCN)

== Awards ==
WCT won the UNDP Mahatma Award for Biodiversity 2023 for its flagship ‘Heater of Hope’ project which involves the development and distribution of energy-efficient, biomass-fueled water heater to thousands of households situated within the tiger corridor in Maharashtra’s Chandrapur district to reduce people's dependency on firewood, thereby arresting forest degradation; reducing human-wildlife conflict; easing women's workload and decreasing their exposure to harmful smoke from the traditional wood-fired stove; and reducing CO_{2} emissions.

WCT was declared as one of the 2025 Satellites For Biodiversity Award Winners for its work focusing on conserving the last nesting habitats for endangered crocodilians and river turtles in the Indo-Gangetic Plains.
