= Thimmappaiah Madiyal =

Indian police chief

Director general and Inspector-general of police, Karnataka
- In office 30 September 2002 – 30 June 2004
- Preceded by: V. V. Bhaskar
- Succeeded by: M. D. Singh

19th Commissioner of the Bangalore City Police
- In office 19 November 1999 – 31 October 2001
- Preceded by: L. Revanasiddaiah
- Succeeded by: H. T. Sangliana

Personal details
- Born: c. 1944 (age 81–82) Alike, South Canara, Madras Presidency, British India
- Police career
- Country: India
- Allegiance: Indian Police Service
- Service years: 1971–2004
- Batch: 1971

Thimmappaiah Madiyal (born 1944) is a retired Indian police officer who served as the Director general and Inspector-general of police of the Karnataka Police from 2002 to 2004. Prior to this, he served as the Commissioner of the Bangalore City Police from 1999 to 2001.

== Early life ==
Madiyal hails from Alike, a village in the erstwhile South Canara district of the Madras Presidency in British India (in present-day Dakshina Kannada, Karnataka, India). He graduated in St. Philomena's College, Mysore. He is a Havyaka Brahmin.

== Career ==
Madiyal joined the Indian Army as a commissioned officer in 1964 under the short service commission, and took part in the Indo-Pakistani war of 1965. In 1971, he joined the Indian Police Service (IPS) and was allotted the Karnataka cadre. He began his career as a police officer as assistant superintendent in Yadgir sub-division, Gulbarga district. He was later posted as superintendent of police of Bellary, Belgaum and Mysore districts.

Madiyal had an eight-year stint in the Special Protection Group and was posted in New Delhi, serving Rajiv Gandhi and his family between 1983 and 1991 in the aftermath of Prime Minister Indira Gandhi's assassination. In June 1991, he was appointed the chief of the Karnataka unit of the special task force formed to nab the forest brigand Veerappan. Madiyal served as chief till December 1992, and the forces were unsuccessful in getting close to Veerappan during his tenure. On being accused of incompetence, Madiyal stated, "Veerappan has been in the forests since his childhood. He doesn't need the logistic support that a fully-equipped force such as the stf needs. He doesn't stay at one place more than once, and he knows all the forest tracks and routes. There have been some instances in the past when he has had a close shave with the stf. But, realistically speaking, only a chance encounter would be successful."

In the mid-1990s, Madiyal served as inspector-general of police of Karnataka State Reserve Police and other departments. He was then appointed intelligence chief of Karnataka, and then in 1999, the Commissioner of the Bangalore City Police, succeeding L. Revanasiddaiah. On promotion as DGP, he was posted to head the Corps of Detectives (CoD) in November 2001. Madiyal was then promoted as director general and inspector-general of police (DG & IGP) in September 2002. He retired from service in June 2004.

== Later life ==
After retirement, Madiyal served as an administrator of Ramachandrapura Mutt headed by Raghaveshwara Bharathi and served voluntarily for several years. In 2012, Madiyal joined an informal group of eminent persons as an "apolitical struggle to strengthen democracy".
