= Commissioner of the Bengaluru City Police =

Head of the Bangalore City Police

Commissioner of Police, Bangalore City
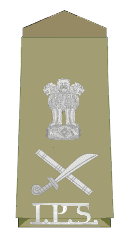
- Insignia of the Police Commissioner, who holds the rank of ADGP.
- Incumbent; Seemanth Kumar Singh since 6 June 2025
- Bangalore City Police
- Reports to: Director General and Inspector General of Police, Karnataka; Home Department, Government of Karnataka
- Residence: Bangalore
- Appointer: Government of Karnataka
- Inaugural holder: C. Chandy
- Formation: 1 July 1963
- First holder: C. Chandy
- Deputy: Additional Commissioner(s) of Police

The Commissioner of Police, Bangalore City is the head of the Bangalore City Police. Founded in July 1963, the post has been held by 32 officers of the Indian Police Service (IPS), the first of whom was C. Chandy. The average length of tenure is 1 year, 8 months; Bangalore's longest-serving Police Commissioner is P. G. Halarnkar, who held office for 3 years, 9 months in the mid-1980s. The incumbent is Seemanth Kumar Singh, who is serving from 6 June 2025 onwards. The Commissioner of Police, Bangalore City has the rank of Additional Director General of Police (ADGP) in the Karnataka state police hierarchy.

== Past Commissioners ==
No.	Name	Tenure	
1	C. Chandy IPS	1 July 1963	19 April 1966
2	Kadhar Ali, IPS	20 April 1966	31 October 1968
3	H. Veerabhadraiah, IPS	31 October 1968	1 June 1972
4	K. G. Ramanna, IPS	2 June 1972	19 September 1973
5	M. L. Chandra Shekar, IPS	20 September 1973	1 June 1976
6	T. Albert Manoraj, IPS	2 June 1976	31 October 1976
7	B. N. Garudachar, IPS	31 October 1976	30 December 1980
8	A. R. Nizamuddin, IPS	31 December 1980	2 March 1983
9	P. G. Harlankar, IPS	2 March 1983	8 December 1986
10	K. U. Balakrishna Rao, IPS	8 December 1986	31 October 1987
11	A. R. Sridharan, IPS	31 October 1987	1 December 1988
12	S. N. S. Murthy, IPS	1 December 1988	5 June 1989
13	Ramalingam, IPS	5 June 1989	31 July 1992
14	Chandulal, IPS	31 July 1992	15 September 1993
15	P. Kodanda Ramaiah, IPS	15 September 1993	21 December 1994
16	T. Srinivasalu, IPS	21 December 1994	13 June 1996
17	S. C. Burman, IPS	13 June 1996	2 April 1997
18	L. Revanasiddaiah, IPS	14 April 1997	18 November 1999
19	T. Madiyal, IPS	19 November 1999	31 October 2001
20	H. T. Sangliana, IPS	31 October 2001	21 October 2002
21	M. D. Singh, IPS	21 October 2002	2 May 2003
22	Mariswamy, IPS	2 May 2003	8 June 2005
23	Ajay Kumar Singh, IPS	8 June 2005	21 June 2006
24	Achyut Rao, IPS	21 June 2006	11 July 2008
25	Shankar Bidari, IPS	11 July 2008	2 May 2011
26	B. G. Jyothi Prakash Mirji, IPS	2 May 2011	5 April 2013
27	Ragavendra H. Auradkar, IPS	5 April 2013	20 May 2013
(26)	B. G. Jyothi Prakash Mirji, IPS	20 May 2013	30 June 2013
(27)	Ragavendra H. Auradkar, IPS	30 June 2013	21 July 2014
28	M. N. Reddy, IPS	21 July 2014	31 July 2015
29	N. S. Megharikh, IPS	31 July 2015	31 December 2016
30	Praveen Sood, IPS	1 January 2017	31 July 2017
31	T. Suneel Kumar, IPS	31 July 2017	17 June 2019
32	Alok Kumar, IPS	17 June 2019	2 August 2019
33	Bhaskar Rao, IPS	2 August 2019	1 August 2020
34	Kamal Pant, IPS	1 August 2020	17 May 2022
34	Pratap Reddy, IPS	17 May 2022	30 May 2023
35	B. Dayananda, IPS	30 May 2023	5 June 2025
36	Seemanth Kumar Singh, IPS	6 June 2025	Incumbent

== See also ==
- Police Commissioner of Delhi
- Police Commissioner of Kolkata
- Police Commissioner of Mumbai
- Commissioner of Police, Hyderabad City
- Commissioner of Pune City Police
