= Bhaskar Rao =

Indian police officer

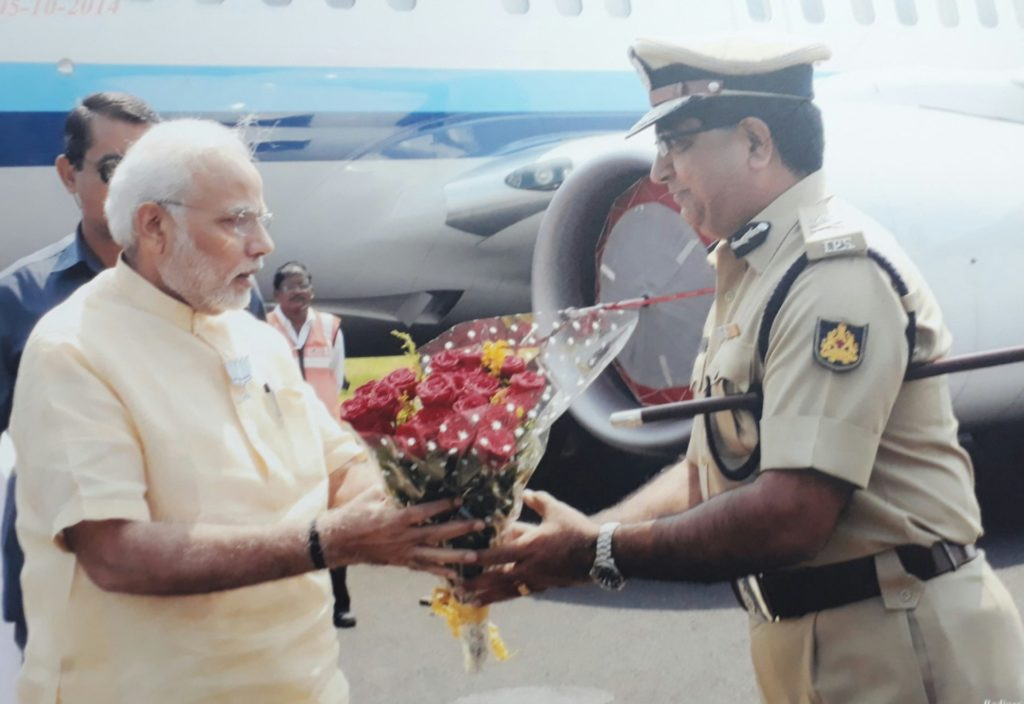
- Bhaskar Rao (right) greeting Indian Prime Minister Narendra Modi (left), in 2017

Additional Director General of Police for Railways
- In office 18 February 2021 – 1 April 2022

Commissioner of Police, Bangalore City
- In office 2 August 2019 – 1 August 2020
- Preceded by: Alok Kumar
- Succeeded by: Kamal Pant

Personal details
- Party: Bharatiya Janata Party (since 2023)
- Other political affiliations: Aam Aadmi Party ( 2022-2023)
- Occupation: Indian Police Service
- Website: bhaskarrao.in

Bhaskar Rao is an Indian politician and former police officer who served as the Commissioner of Bengaluru City Police, from 2 August 2019 to 1 August 2020. Rao comes from Bengaluru and was previously Additional Director General of Police (ADGP) in the Karnataka State Reserve Police as well as ADGP, Internal security Division. Mr. Rao served as the ADGP, Railways before retiring on 1 April 2022. Post his tenure in the Police department, he joined Aam Aadmi Party (AAP). He joined Bharathiya Janatha party (BJP) after 11 months of political experience in AAP. Bhaskar Rao is currently serving as the Vice president of Indian Red cross Society, Karnataka state branch.

== Career ==
During the COVID-19 pandemic in India, while serving as the Additional Director General of Police for Railways, he was appointed as the special nodal officer in charge to supervise and enforce COVID-19 guidelines for the northern range comprising Vijayapura, Bagalkot and Belagavi districts. He brought out a set of guidelines to handle the Pandemic by appealing to All merchants associations, the apex body of Belagavi Chamber of Commerce to wear masks, sanitize and maintain social distancing. Rao proposed to use banners to create awareness in local language. He appealed to all the bodies who have infrastructure for oxygen cylinders and ambulance to support the cause. He also instructed all public transport system not to take passengers without masks.

Rao also worked on the initiative where railway police official would educate the railway staffers on the safety measures with nuisance mongers and thefts. He devised "Happy to help" visiting cards of the police officials that will be given to the passengers. The passengers can reach out easily to the police in case of emergencies. Owing to COVID-19 pandemic times, he introduced an initiative where whenever a Government Railway Police personnel returns to work post COVID treatment, they get a rousing welcome at the railway police stations. He also instructed to make arrangement for hot water and immunity booster in police stations. Under his mentorship, Railway police with SWAG ERT and Sonu Sood Foundation, a rapid oxygen Centre at Mangalore, Bengaluru, Hubballi and Bellary railway stations were launched during COVID-19 crisis. Training was also given to policemen to operate medical oxygen cylinders. In his tenure as the ADGP, Railways, a special task force was formed to patrol railway stations and trains in the Karnataka State. Training in self defense and other professional activities was provided. Task Force cops was empowered to take decisions on their own when they are on rounds.

While serving as the Commissioner of Bengaluru city Police, in 2020–21, to handle COVID-19 Pandemic situation, Rao invited citizens for a community engagement by calling for volunteers to help the police. To address the issue of migrant laborers, he instructed teams to convert marriage halls to shelters. For implementation of lockdown in Bengaluru city, Rao had provided a list of do's and don'ts to his officers to provide clarity to handle various kinds of situation. He had banned taking photographs of COVID-19 patients without their consent. When the number of COVID-19 cases increased in Bengaluru, Rao instructed all police staff aged above 55 years to stay at home. He also instructed the patrolling staff to avoid entering police stations. He introduced pass system to regulate the movement of people and vehicles in the city during the Lockdown and ease movement for essential services, food and e-commerce delivery services.

Rao was criticized for not following Indian government guidelines on social distancing after he attended a church service in May 2020.

Upon the request of Bhaskar Rao, a music video was developed by filmmaker Yogaraj Bhat to encourage volunteers and philanthropists who help people fight Corona disease. In June 2020, Bhaskar Rao felicitated a police constable named G.N. Ravikumar, for rescuing migrant workers and their children, when a tree collapsed on their makeshift shelter at Palace grounds.

In his tenure as the commissioner of Bengaluru city, he deployed mannequins dressed as police at selective places to encourage people to abide laws. When the abrogation of Article 370 happened, Rao met a group of Kashmiris to assure them on safety and also appointed a nodal officer to directly address any concerns of Kashmiris living in Bengaluru. The officer Phone number was also circulated on social media to reach out if need arises. Ahead of the Ayodhya verdict and the sensitivity of the issue, Rao had taken precautionary measures to ensure peace in the city irrespective of the Judgement. He had met various majority and minority religious groups and appealed to remain calm. Additional forces were deployed in the city to avoid any untoward incident.

During the Anti-CAA protests in Bengaluru, Rao managed a record 82 protests in a month.

While taking note of repeated complaints from Constables about high workload affecting personal life, Rao issued an order to compulsorily give leave on their birthdays so that they can spend time with family. This order was given to all constables handling law and order, traffic, crime branch and city armed reserve police.

When he served as the state Transport commissioner, he had ordered to implement the helmet rule strictly for all the two wheeler riders. Rao further ordered to use only Bureau of Indian Standard 4151:1993 helmets. Bhaskar Rao introduced microprocessor based smart card system which can record traffic violations, road accidents and can prevent the creation of forged documents. All the existing DLs and RCs were converted to smart card. Smart card also carried 1 year accident insurance cover. He was responsible to build the Automated Vehicle Driving Testing Track (electronically controlled with sensors) for both two and four wheelers. This was seen as the first of its kind in Asia. He had also sent directive to all senior officials of the department to ensure fitness among all their vehicles. To promote the use of alternative transportation, he participated in a cycling event, Tour of Nilgiris a 900 km, eight-day cycling tour.

When serving as the KSRTC director (security & intelligence) in 2013, he introduced web-based online reservation system for passengers named AVATHAR. This was first of its kind in the country.

During his tenure as ADGP (Karnataka State Reserve Police), he issued circular to suspend and remove officers from employment who are careless about health and lifestyle. This circular issued after many officers died due to life style related diseases. He introduced regular body mass index monitoring and also started exercise regime for obese policemen. He led a cycling event, "Karnataka Darshan", covering 1,756 kilometers to spread the message of "Clean India mission" and especially focused on use of toilets to end open defecation, plastic waste and work towards ecological conservation. He had taken initiative to plant 2200 teak saplings in India Reserve Battalion (IRB) Munirabad premises by KSRP officers. A drive, 'Karavaligere Join Police' to encourage youth from coastal districts of Karnataka to join police force was organized by him.

Bhaskar Rao was the first commissioner of police in Belgaum city after the establishment of a police commissionerate in the city.

When Rao was serving as the inspector general of Police-Internal Security Division, he was also posted as the inspector general of police-training division, thereby handling two posts and responsibilities at the same time. Karnataka state Industrial security Force (KSISF) was formed when he was serving as the IGP-Internal security. He arranged for training of KSISF personnel from Central Industrial Security force (CISF). While serving as the ADGP - Internal security, security for 4 dams in Karnataka - Harangi, Taraka, Kabini and Nugu was taken over by KSISF. Rao as ADGP - Internal security has initiated developing and training of Women police officers in Centre for Counter terrorism (Garuda Force) which mainly handles anti - terrorist activities in the state of Karnataka. The internal security division though established in 2008, had not filed any First information report (FIR) till now. After taking charge as the ADGP, ISD, Rao ensured to activate the ISD police station with five FIR's filed.

He was invited as speaker in TEDx conference on the topic "Importance of Community Relationships".

== Awards ==
He was awarded the United Nations' Medal for the Services rendered in International Peacekeeping in a warzone (Kosovo, Yugoslavia) in the year 2000.

Awarded the "Police medal for meritorious service" on Indian Independence day in 2008.

Awarded with "President's medal" for distinguished service on the occasion of Indian Independence Day in 2015.
