= Bangalore City Traffic Police =

Jurisdictional structure
- Operations jurisdiction: Bangalore, India
- Map of Bangalore City Traffic Police's jurisdiction
- Area: City: 741 square kilometres (286 sq mi); Metro: 8,005 square kilometres (3,091 sq mi)
- Population: City: 8,443,675; Metro: 10,456,000
- Legal jurisdiction: Bangalore City, Karnataka
- Primary governing body: Bangalore City Police
- Secondary governing body: Karnataka State Police
- Constituting instrument: Police Act 1861
- Specialist jurisdiction: Highways, roads, traffic

Operational structure
- Headquarters: Infantry Road, Next to Indian Express Building, Bangalore
- Agency executive: D.R. B.R Ravikanthe gowda IPS, Additional Commissioner of police (traffic)
- Parent agency: Bangalore City Police

Facilities
- Traffic Police Stations: 42

Website
- Official website

The Bangalore City Traffic Police (BTP), officially Bengaluru City Traffic Police, is a specialised unit of the Bangalore City Police responsible for overseeing and enforcing traffic safety compliance on city roads as well as managing the flow of traffic in the city of Bangalore, Karnataka.

As of October 2014, the BTP employed 2684 full-time personnel. This included 1309 Police Constables (PCs), 825 Head Constables (HCs), 303 Assistant Sub-Inspectors (ASIs), 191 Police Sub-Inspectors (PSIs) 45 Police Inspectors (PIs). This number excludes 9 Assistant Commissioners of Police (ACPs), 2 Deputy Commissioners of Police (DCPs), and 1 Additional Commissioner of Police, Traffic (Addl.C.P)

The Commissioner of Police is the overall operational leader of the force, but the Force is normally managed by the Additional Commissioner of Police on behalf of the Commissioner.

A few informal names and abbreviations exist for the Bangalore Traffic Police, the most common being the BTP. Within the city, it is simply known as the Traffic Police.

The BTP's headquarters is located at #05, Infantry road, near Indian Express building.

== History ==
Although the city police system was successfully established a century ago, a traffic wing became necessary in 1930. Then Inspector General Hamilton is responsible for the formation of traffic police wing in Bangalore. The first Headquarters was at Halasur Gate Outer Station with a sanctioned strength of 2 European constables, 7 duffedars, 2 constables, 12 writers, and 37 duty officers.

== Gallery ==
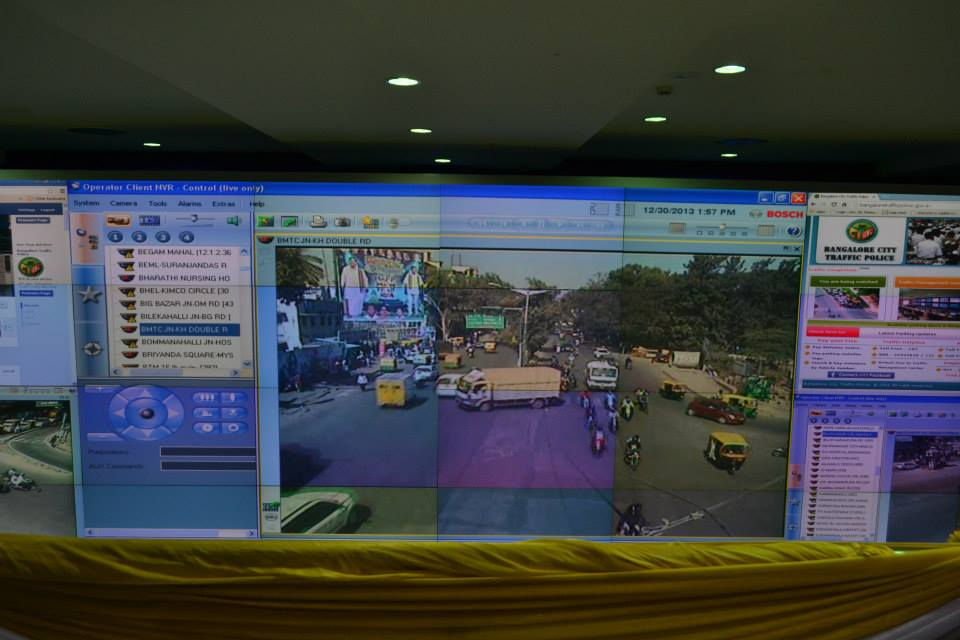
New Traffic Management Center

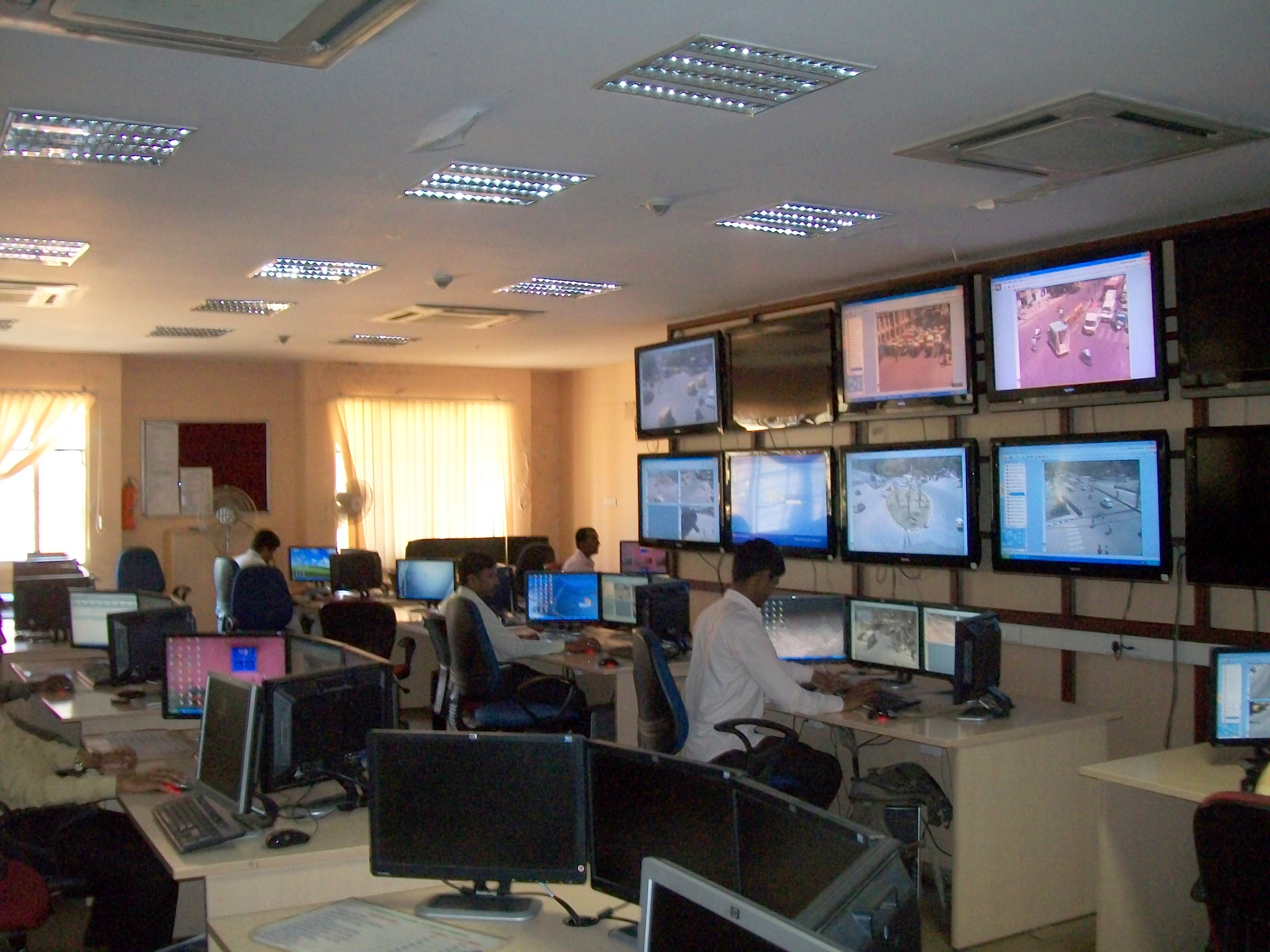
Traffic Management Center at Ashok Nagar Police Center, Bangalore.

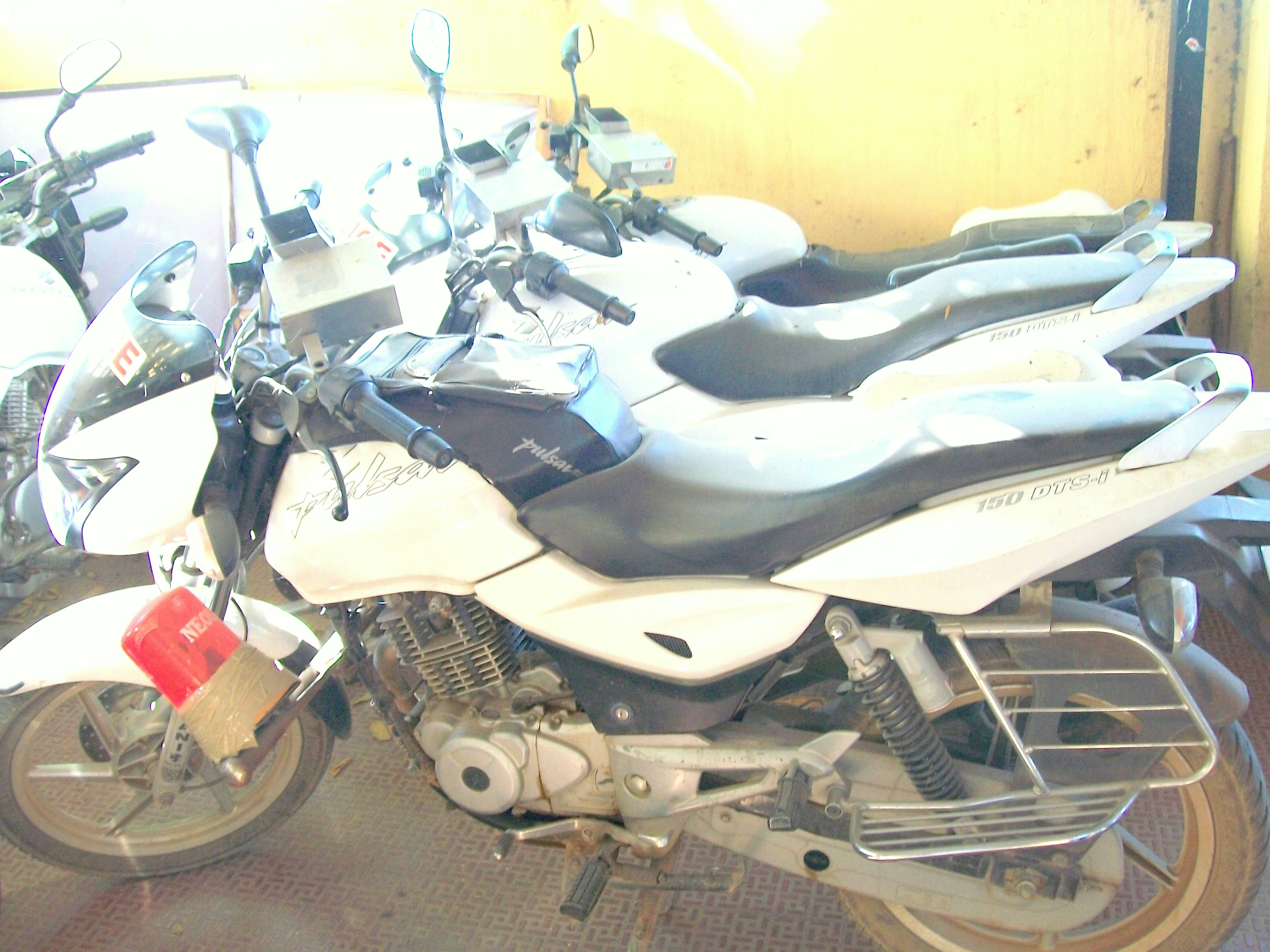
Bikes used by Bangalore Traffic Police.

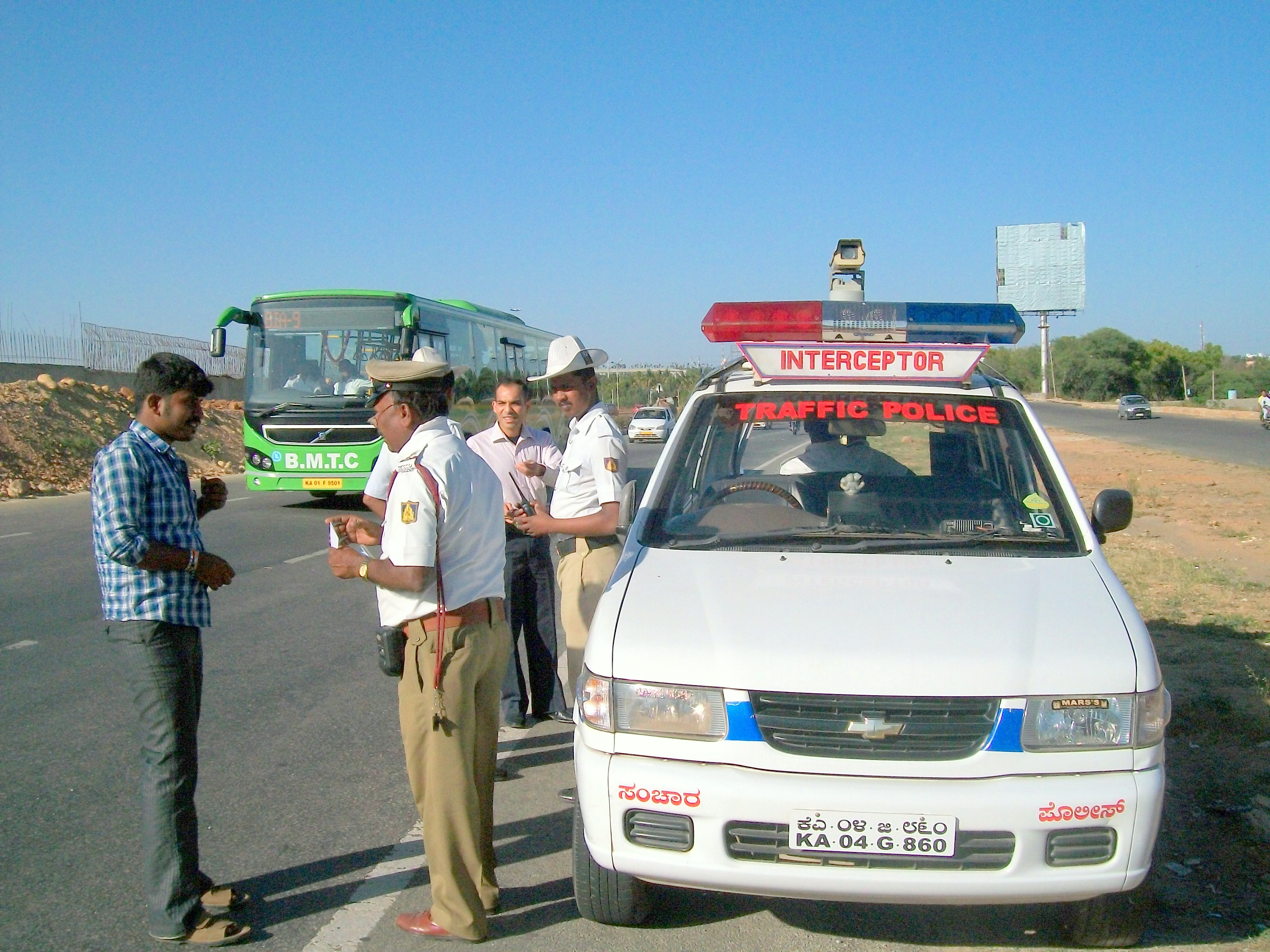
Interceptor at Bangalore Airport Road-

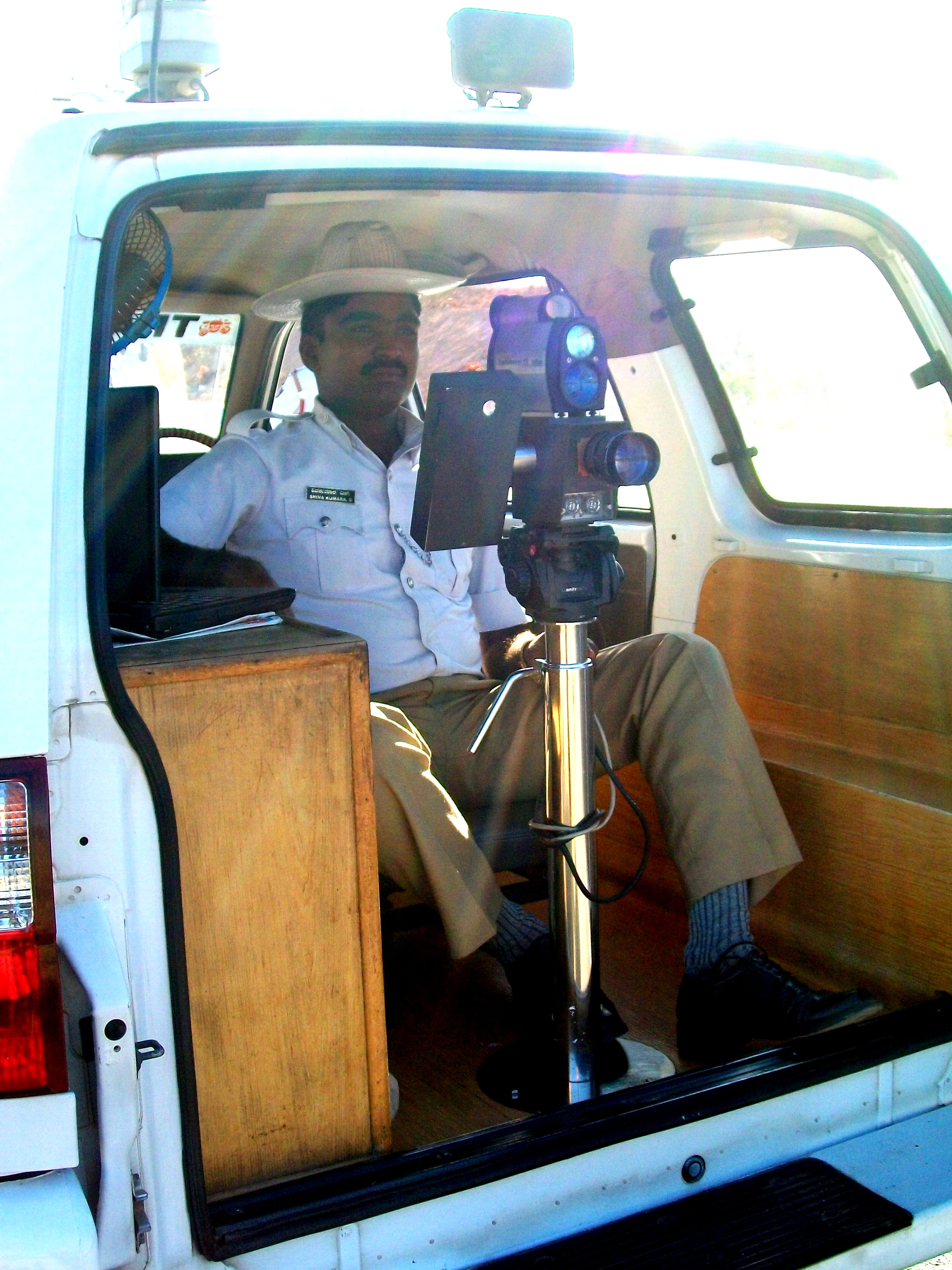
A Traffic Constable inside the Interceptor monitoring the traffic speed at Bangalore Airport Road.

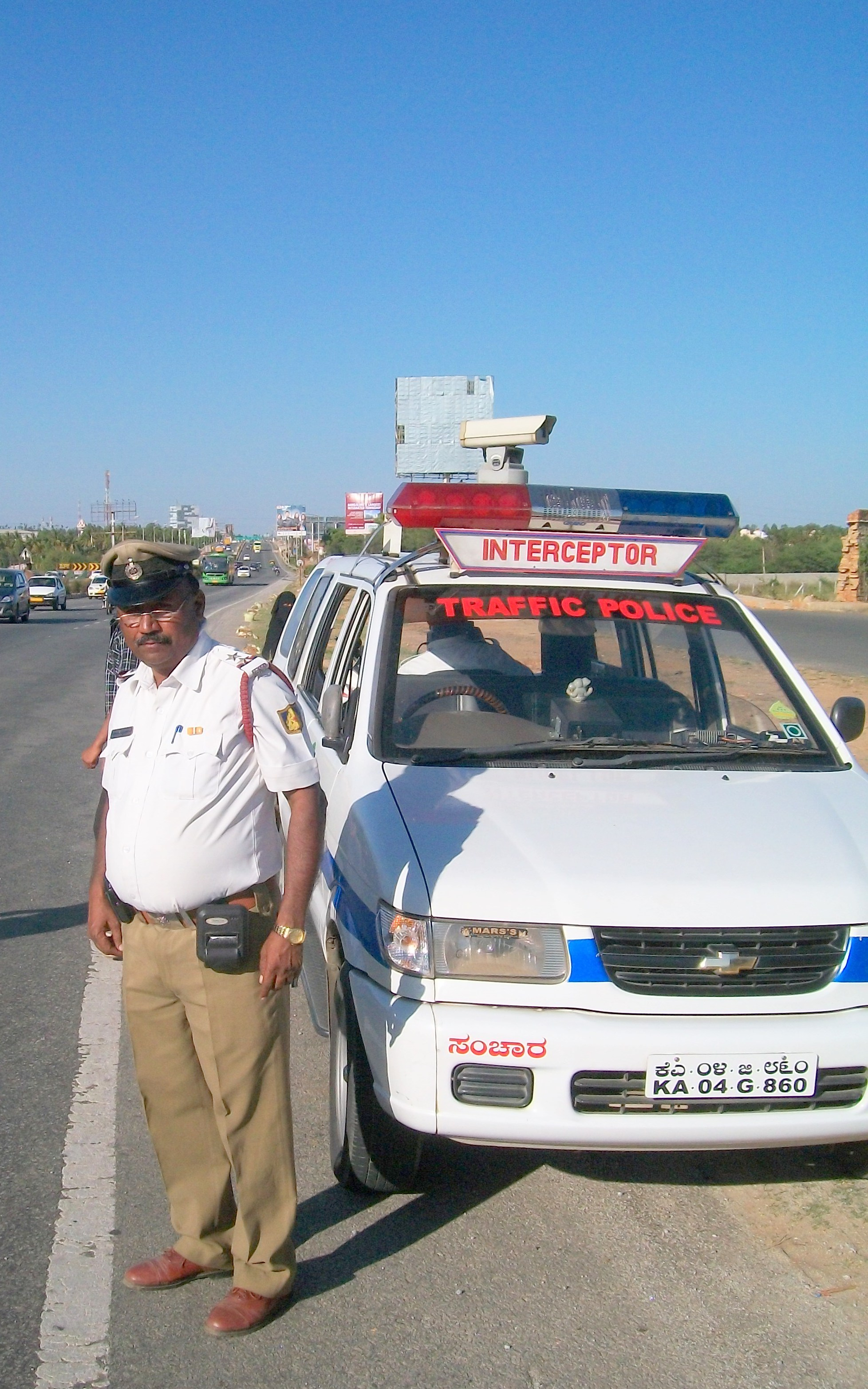
Traffic Sub-Inspector of Police with Interceptor on duty at Bangalore Airport Road.

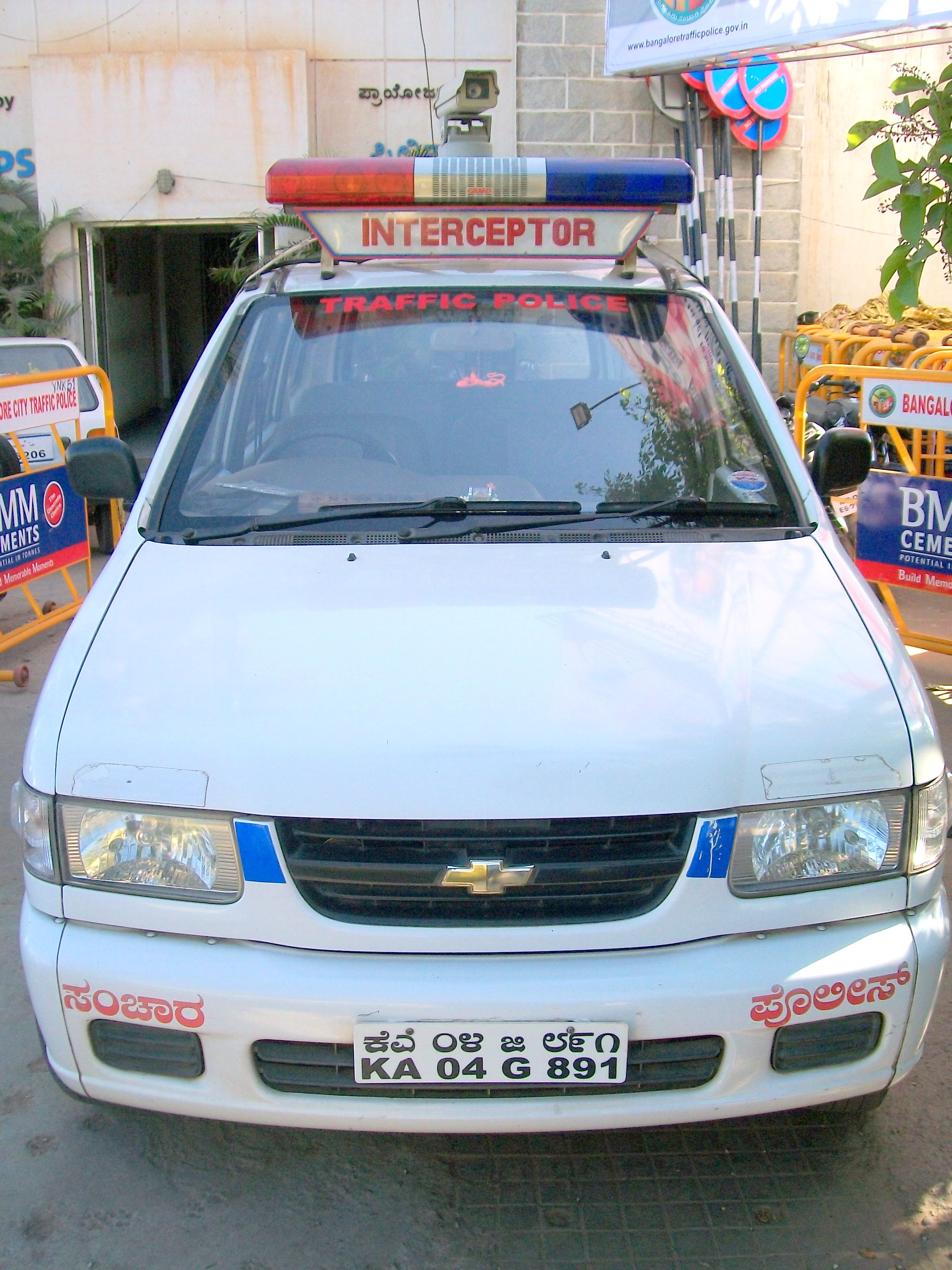
Typical Interceptors used (Make and Model: Chevrolet Travera)

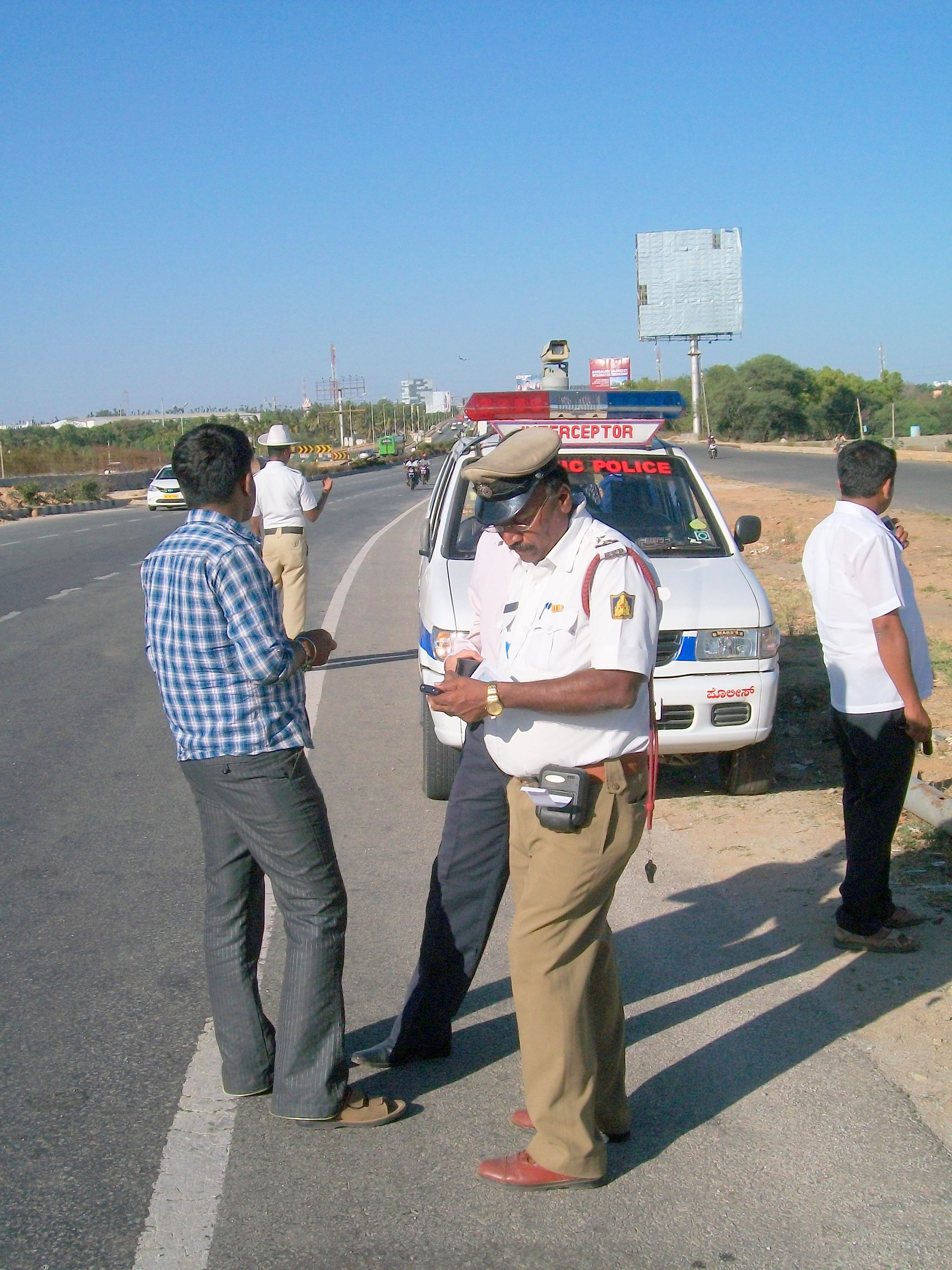
Traffic Sub-Inspector of Police with Interceptor using Black Berry phone for vehicle and driver records

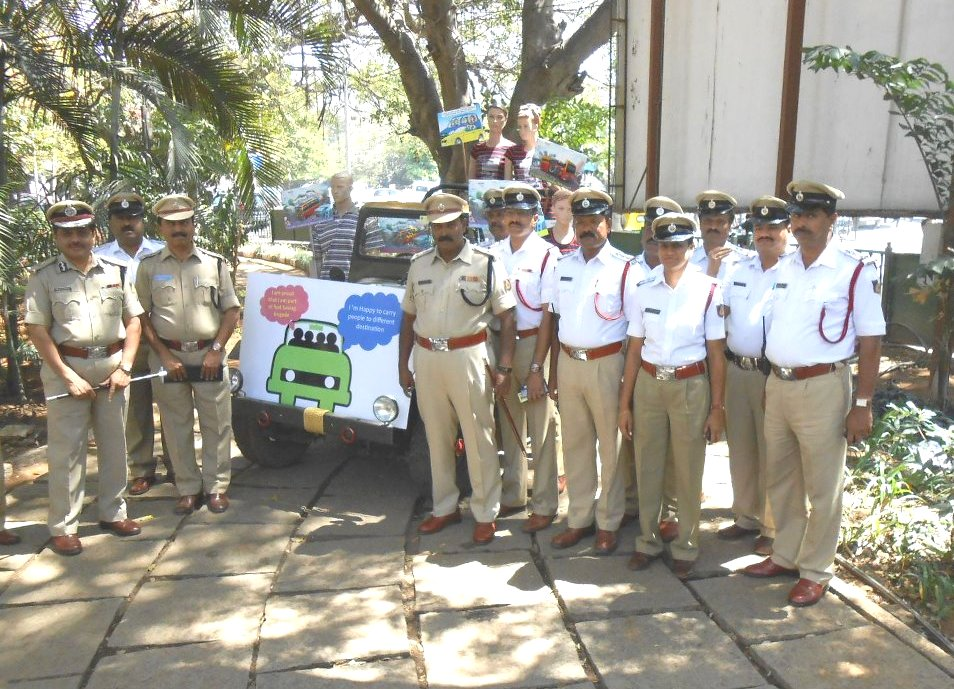
Car Polling Awareness Campaign

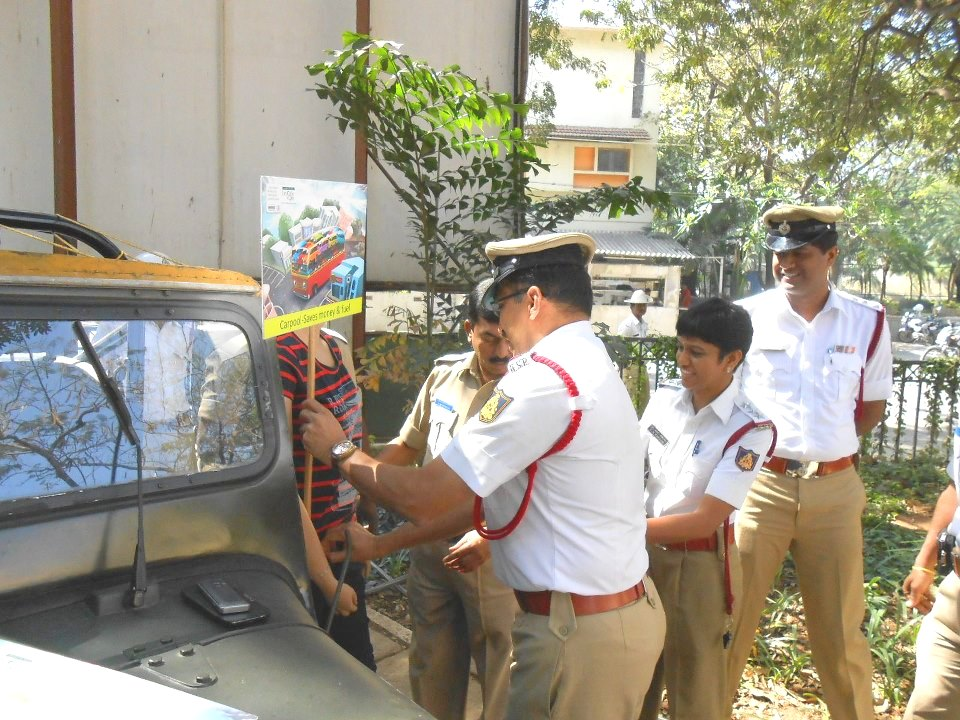
Car Polling Awareness Campaign

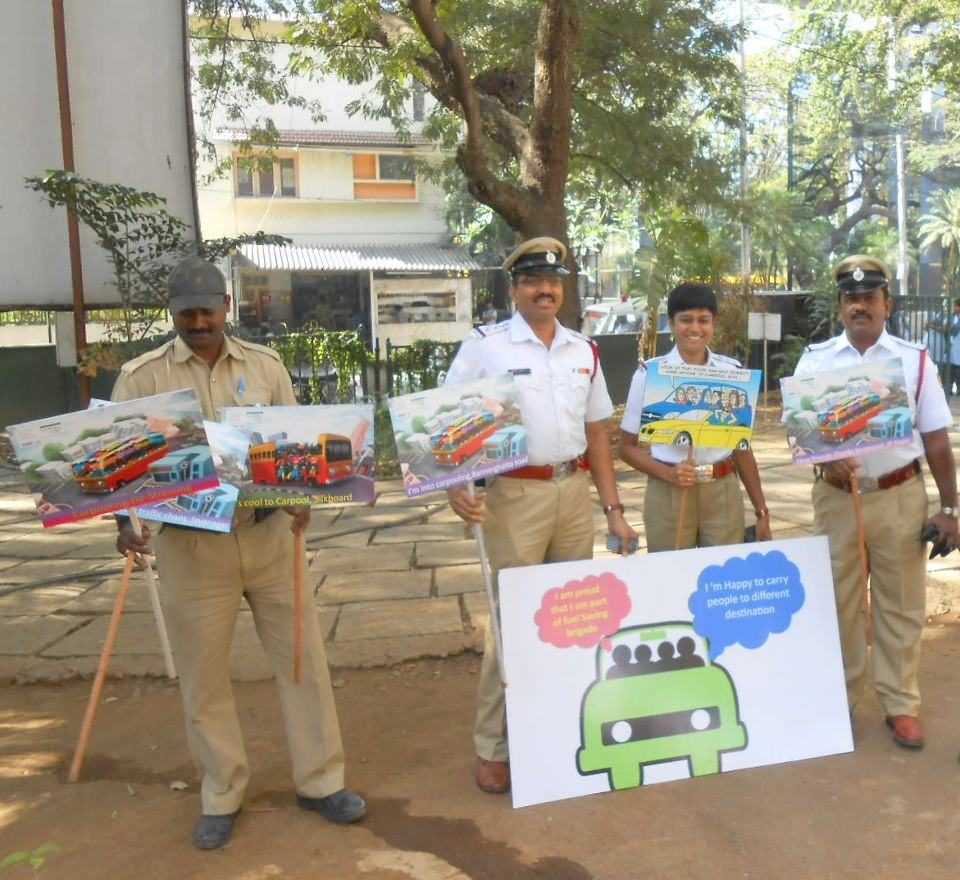
Car Polling Awareness Campaign

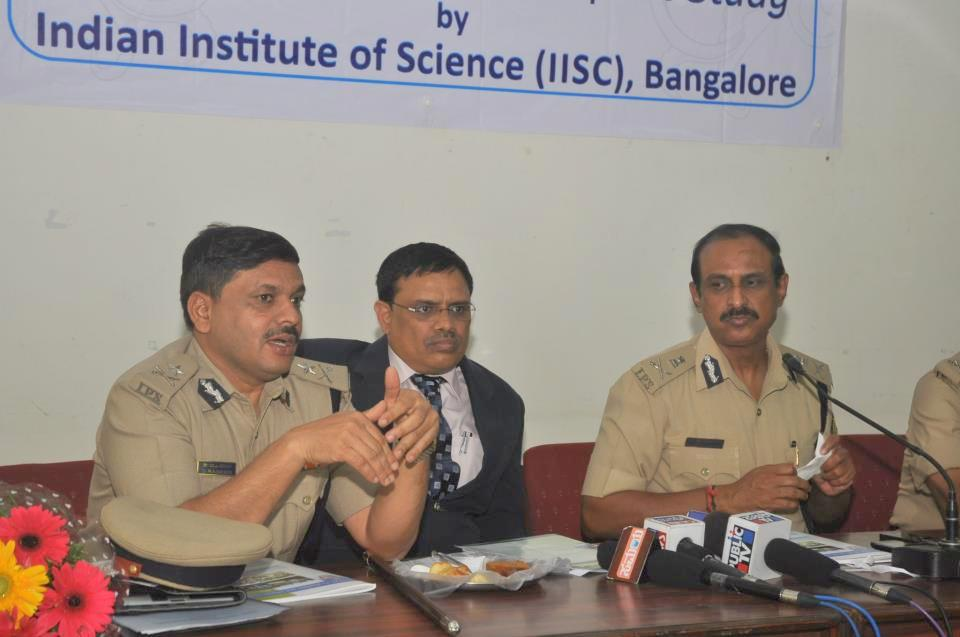
M.A. Saleem IPS, Additional Police Commissioner (left) & Chief of Bangalore City Traffic Police & Bangalore City Police Commissioner Jyothi Prakash BG Mirji, IPS (right) in press conference
