= B. G. Jyothi Prakash Mirji =

Indian Police officer (born 1953)

Beladamadu Gangadhar Jyothi Prakash Mirji (born 21 November 1953) is an Indian Police officer who served as the Commissioner of Bangalore City Police from 2 May 2011 to 5 April 2013. He joined as Deputy Superintendent of Police later getting promoted to the Indian Police Service. He retired as the Principal Secretary of the Home department, Government of Karnataka.He is well known for spearheading the operation to tackle down the dreaded forest brigand Veerappan, as the chief of the Karnataka Special Task Force. Mirji was rewarded with the President's Vishisht Seva Medal in 2008, a Police Medal for meritorious and distinguished service.
