= Commissioner of Pune City Police =

Head of the police department in Pune, India

Commissioner of Police, Pune
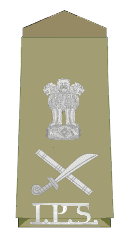
- Rank Insignia of the Police Commissioner
- Incumbent; Amitesh Kumar since February 1, 2024
- Pune City Police Department (PCPD)
- Style: The Honorable
- Status: Pune City Police Department (PCPD)
- Reports to: Home Minister of Maharashtra
- Residence: Sadhu Vaswani Road, Camp, Pune – 411001
- Appointer: Chief Minister of Maharashtra
- Term length: 1 to 3 years (Note: The Pune Police Commissioner generally serves about 1–3 years, depending on government decisions.)
- Inaugural holder: E. S. Modak
- Formation: 1 June 1965
- Website: Official Website

The Commissioner of Police, Pune is the head of Pune City Police Department (PCPD). The Government of Maharashtra appoints the Commissioner from among senior IPS officers of the state cadre.

The commissioner is an Indian Police Service officer of the rank of Director general of police (DGP) or Additional director general of police (ADGP). The commissioner heads the police force in a jurisdiction consisting of approximately 650 km^{2} area and home to a population of 1.6 Crore (16 million) with a 40 lakh (4 million) floating population.

The current Pune Commissionerate came into existence on 1 July 1965. The Pune City Police Commissionerate was established in 1965, and E. S. Modak was its first commissioner, while the current being Amitesh Kumar (since February 1, 2024). The Police Commissioner of Pune City does not exercise authority over the entire Pune district; their jurisdiction is limited to Pune City. Pimpri-Chinchwad is administered by a separate and independent Police Commissionerate with jurisdiction confined to the PCMC city area, while the remaining areas of Pune district are headed by the Superintendent of Police (SP), Pune Rural, an IPS officer operating under a different command structure.

== See also ==
- Pune district
- Commissioner of the Greater Mumbai Police
- Police Commissioner of Bangalore
- Police Commissioner of Delhi
- Commissioner of Police, Hyderabad City
