= P. G. Harlankar =

Indian police officer (died 2021)

Padmakar Ganapat Halarnkar (1932/3 – 2 January 2021) was Commissioner of Police, Bangalore City, Karnataka state, India and also Director General of Central Reserve Police Force. He was born in 1932 at Rajiwadi near Pune. He was Indian Police Service (IPS) officer of 1956 batch, Karnataka cadre. He was the Commissioner of Bangalore city from 1983 to 1986. He was Director General Central Reserve Police Force from 1 April 1988 to 30 September 1990. He was considered as honest, strict police officer who resisted pressure from politicians. He was a native of Pednem, Goa. He died on 2 January 2021 at Bengaluru at the age of 88 years.

He had a son named Samar Halarnkar.
