= Alike =

- village
- Location in Karnataka, India Alike (India)
- Coordinates: 12.9°N 75.03°E
- Country: India
- State: Karnataka
- District: Dakshina Kannada
- Nearest City: Mangalore
- Talukas: Bantwal

Government
  - Body: Local Village panchayat

Population (2001)
  - Total: 5,766

Languages
  - Official: Tulu, Kannada
- Time zone: UTC+5:30 (IST)

Alike or Aalike (Village ID 617591) is a village in Bantwal taluk of Dakshina Kannada district, Karnataka, India. The languages spoken are Tulu, Kannada, Beary, Urdu, and Konkani. According to the 2011 census it has a population of 5840 living in 1041 households. Its main agriculture product is arecanut growing.

There is a public health centre run by the government of Karnataka. The Sri Sathya Sai Loka Seva Educational Institutions has three campuses in and near Alike, with 1500 students.

== Nearby places ==
- Mangalore
- Kasaragod
- Vittla (Vittal)
