= L. Revanasiddaiah =

Indian police officer

- Known for: Introduction of Hoysala patrolling units, Makkala Sahayavani, and Vanitha Sahayavani.
- Police career
- Police service: Indian Police Service (IPS)
- Department: Karnataka Police
- Service years: 1965 -
- Status: Retired
- Rank: Director General and Inspector General of Police
- Awards: Chief Minister's Gold Medal for excellence in Investigation (1980), President’s Gold Medal for meritorious service, President’s Medal for Distinguished Service (1984)
- Other work: President of the Foundation for the Restoration of Human Dignity (FORHD)

L. Revanasiddaiah is a former Indian Police officer from Karnataka belonging to the Indian Police Service, 1965 batch. He served as the Director General and Inspector General of Police, Karnataka and was also the Additional Director of Central Bureau of Investigation. He was also the Commissioner of Bangalore City Police from 14-04-1997 to 18-11-1999. He was responsible for the introduction of the Police patrolling units, Hoysala, and also Makkala Sahayavani and Vanitha Sahayavani, the children's and women's helplines respectively. He is currently the president of the Foundation for the Restoration of Human Dignity(FORHD), an NGO into the service of the distressed children and women belonging to the families of convicts. Revanasiddaiah is the recipient of the Chief Ministers Gold Medal for excellence in Investigation in 1980, President’s Gold Medal for meritorious service, and President’s Medal for Distinguished Service in 1984.
