= Karnataka State Police =

Indian law enforcement agency

Karnataka State Police ಕರ್ನಾಟಕ ರಾಜ್ಯ ಪೊಲೀಸ್ Karnātaka Rājya Polīs
- ಕರ್ನಾಟಕ ರಾಜ್ಯ ಪೊಲೀಸ್
- Abbreviation: KSP
- Motto: Satyameva Jayate "Truth alone triumphs"

Agency overview
- Formed: April 2, 1965
- Preceding agency: Mysore State Police
- Employees: 80,000

Jurisdictional structure
- Operations jurisdiction: Karnataka, IN
- Map of Karnataka Police Department's jurisdiction
- Area: 191,791 km2
- Population: 61,130,704
- Legal jurisdiction: Karnataka
- Governing body: Home Department, Government of Karnataka
- Constituting instrument: Constitution of India
- General nature: Local civilian police

Operational structure
- Headquarters: Karnataka State Police, Bengaluru – 560001
- Elected Minister responsible: Priyank Kharge, Minister for Home
- Agency executive: M. A. Saleem, IPS, Director General and Inspector General of Police, Karnataka State
- Parent agency: Department of Home, Government of Karnataka
- Child agency: Bangalore City Police

Facilities
- Stations: 923 (2013–2014)
- Patrol Vehicles: Mahindra Bolero, Suzuki Ertiga, Chevrolet Tavera, Toyota Innova
- Animals: Dogs

Notables
- Anniversary: 2 April

Website
- ksp.karnataka.gov.in

The Karnataka State Police is the law enforcement agency for the Indian state of Karnataka. It was established in 1965 and is headquartered in Bengaluru, the capital city of Karnataka. The KSP is a state police force that works under the purview of the Department of Home Affairs, Government of Karnataka. The department is headed by the Director General and Inspector General of Police. As on First February 2026 there are 1103 Police stations in Karnataka state.

== Organization ==
The Director General and Inspector General of Police (DG & IGP) is the head of the State police department, and under him are the Director General of Police and Additional Director General of Police. Each Additional Director General of Police is in charge of a particular function: law and order, crime and technical services, administration, intelligence, the Karnataka State Reserve Police, recruitment and training.

The District Police administration is headed by a Superintendent of Police (SP). A group of districts comprise a Police Range, headed by an Inspector General of Police (IGP). Big cities have a Police Commissionerate led by the Commissioner of Police (CP). Bengaluru is headed by an officer with the rank of Additional Director General of Police (ADG). Mysuru is headed by an officer with the rank of Inspector General of Police. Belagavi, Hubballi-Dharwad, Kalaburagi and Mangaluru are headed by an officer with the rank of Deputy Inspector General of Police (DIG).

There are seven police ranges and 32 police districts in the state of Karnataka.

Ranges and districts
Range	Districts
Southern Range, Mysuru	Chamarajanagara, Hassana, Kodagu, Mandya and Mysuru
Western Range, Mangaluru	Chikkamagaluru, Dakshina Kannada, Udupi and Uttara Kannada
Eastern Range, Davangere	Chitradurga, Davanagere, Haveri and Shivamogga
Central Range, Bengaluru	Bengaluru Rural, Bengaluru Urban, Chikkaballapura, Kolar, KGF, Ramanagara and Tumakuru
Northern Range, Belagavi	Bagalkote, Belagavi, Dharwada, Gadaga and Vijayapura
North Eastern Range, Kalaburagi	BIdar, Kalaburgi and Yadagiri
Ballari Range, Ballari	Ballari, Koppala, Raichuru and Vijayanagara

The police stations are the lowest units of the police department. There are 906 police stations, 230 circle offices, 91 SDPOs and 31 DPOs (including railway police) in Karnataka state. Police stations are headed by Inspector in towns and cities. There may be two to four Sub-Inspectors (S.I.) in addition to assistant sub-inspectors (A.S.I), Head Constables (H.C.) and police constables (P.C.). Rural police stations are headed by a sub-inspector or two sub-inspectors covering law and order and crime, depending on the station's importance and sensitivity. They are grouped into circles, comprising a sub-division. Sub-divisions are headed by Deputy Superintendents of Police and circles by Police Inspectors. Additional superintendent of police's (ASP's) are also there in some districts.

Officers

- Director General & Inspector General of Police
  (DG & IGP)
- Additional Director General of Police (ADGP)
- Inspector General of Police (IGP)
- Deputy Inspector General of Police (DIG)
- Superintendent of Police (SP)
- Additional Superintendent of Police (Addl.SP)
- Assistant SP (IPS) or Deputy SP (KSPS)

Sub-ordinates

- Police Inspector/Circle Police Inspector (PI/CPI)
- Police Sub-Inspector (PSI)
- Assistant Sub-Inspector of Police (ASI)
- Head Constable (HC)
- Constable (PC)

== Insignia of Karnataka Police (State Police) ==
Gazetted officers

Indian Police Service cadre officers rank insignia
Insignia
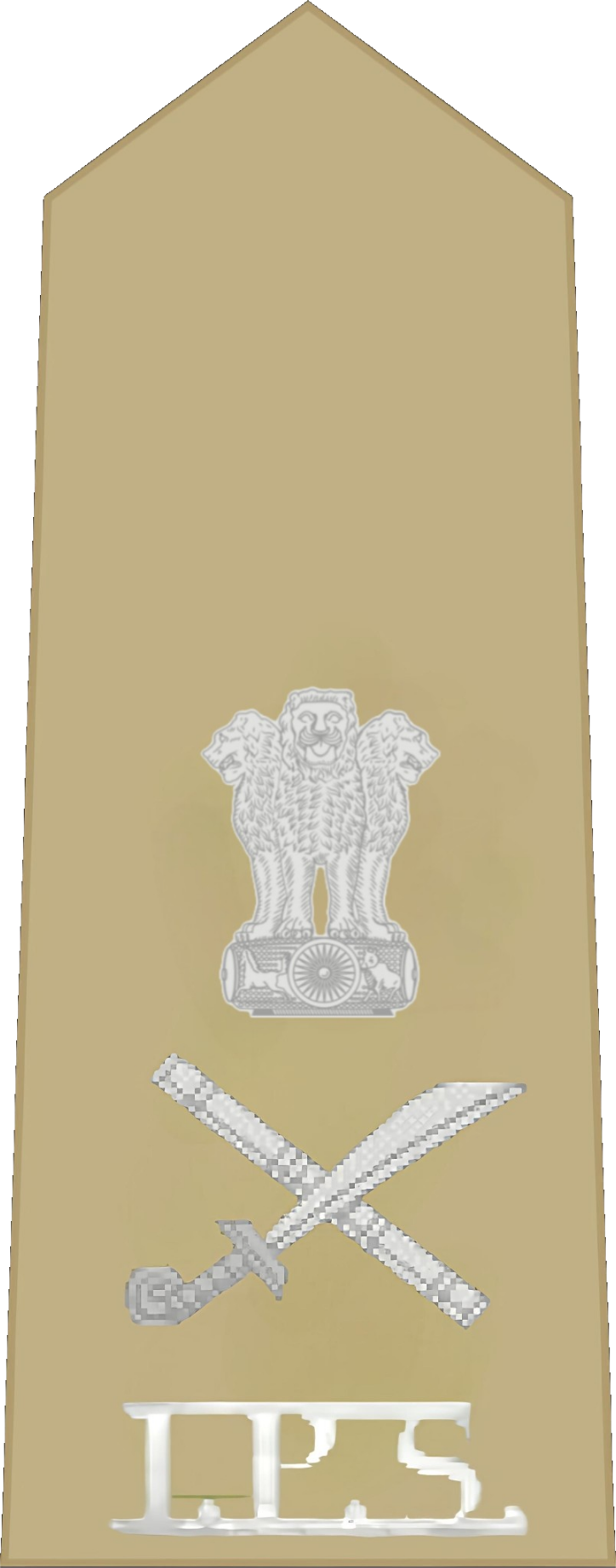
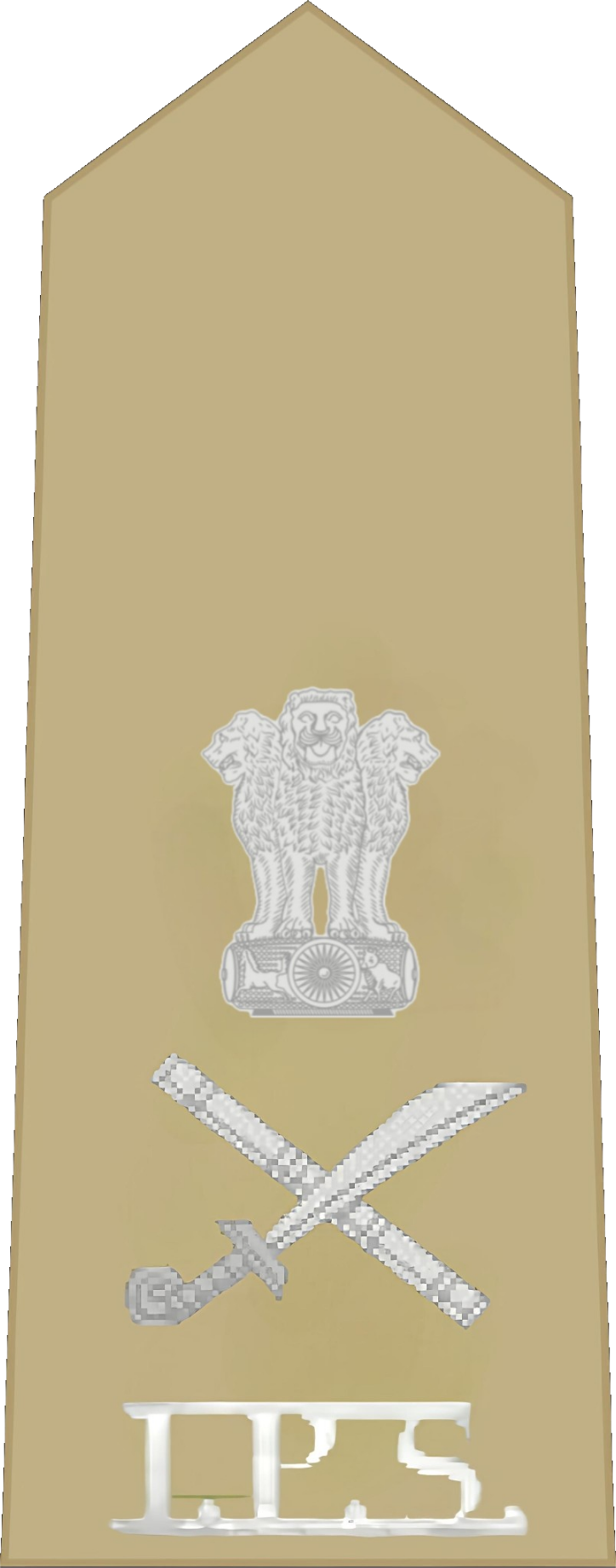
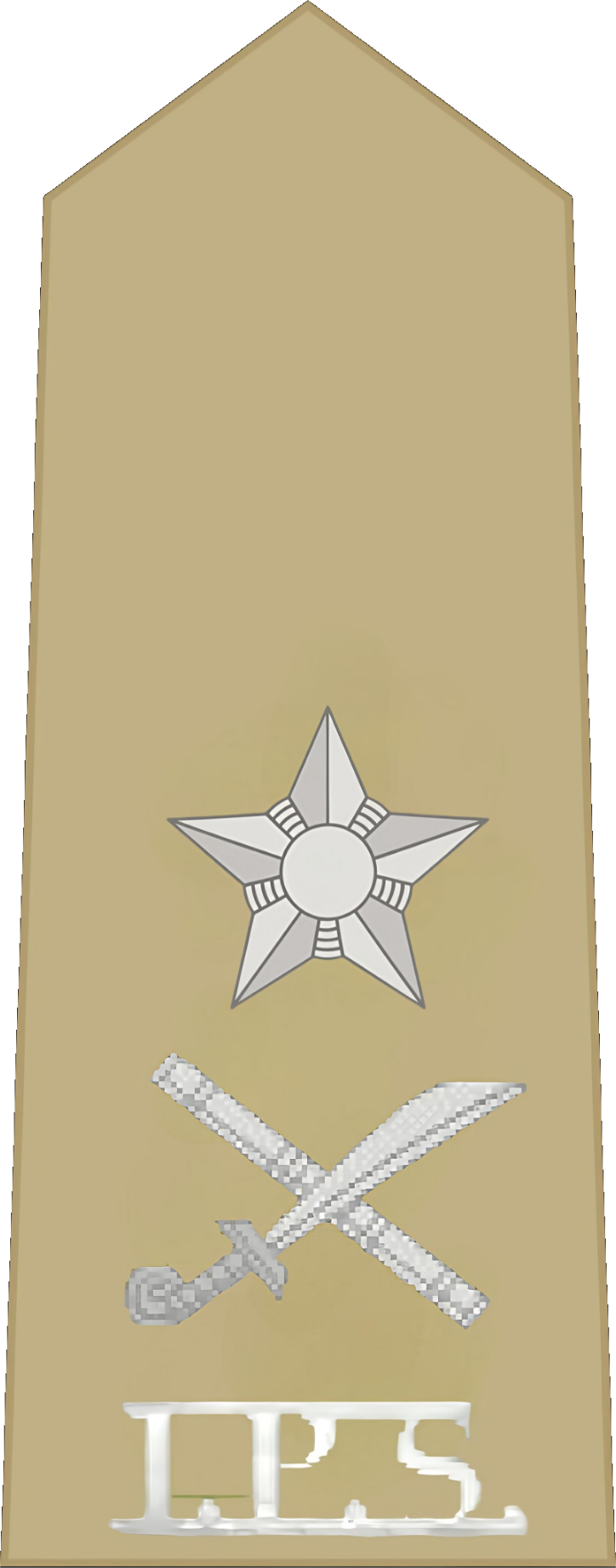
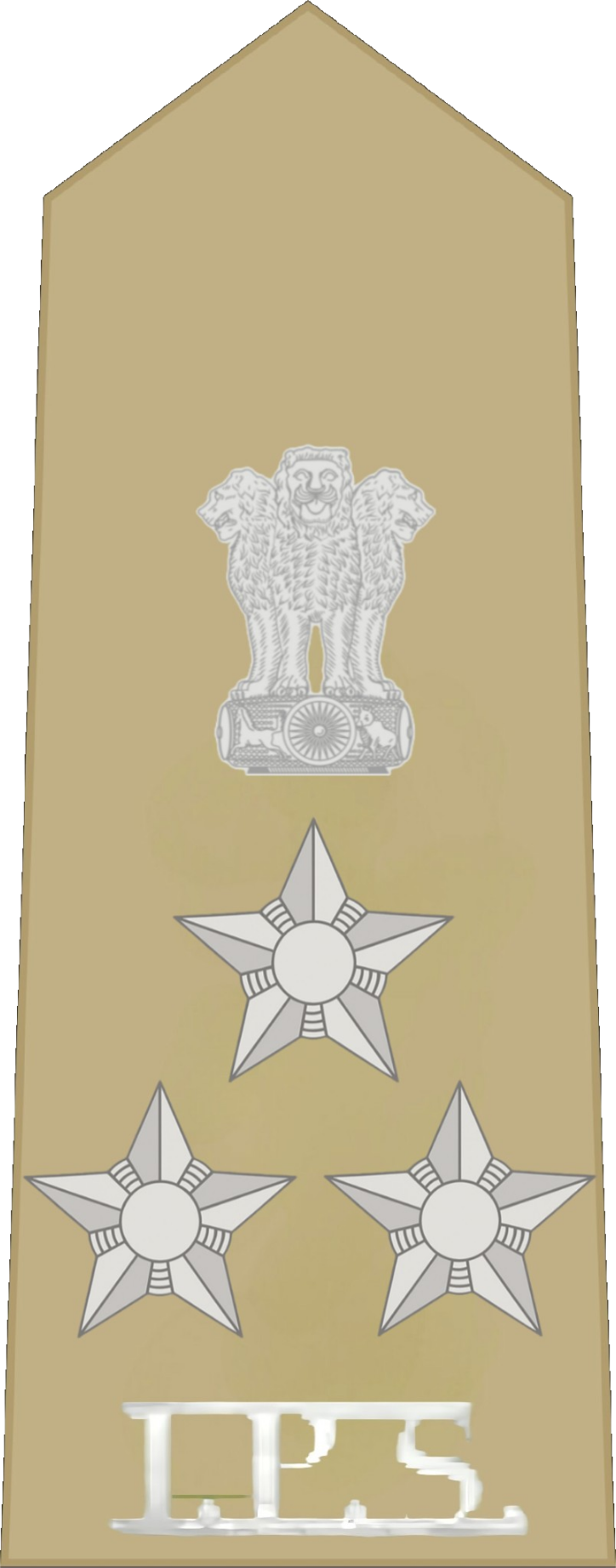
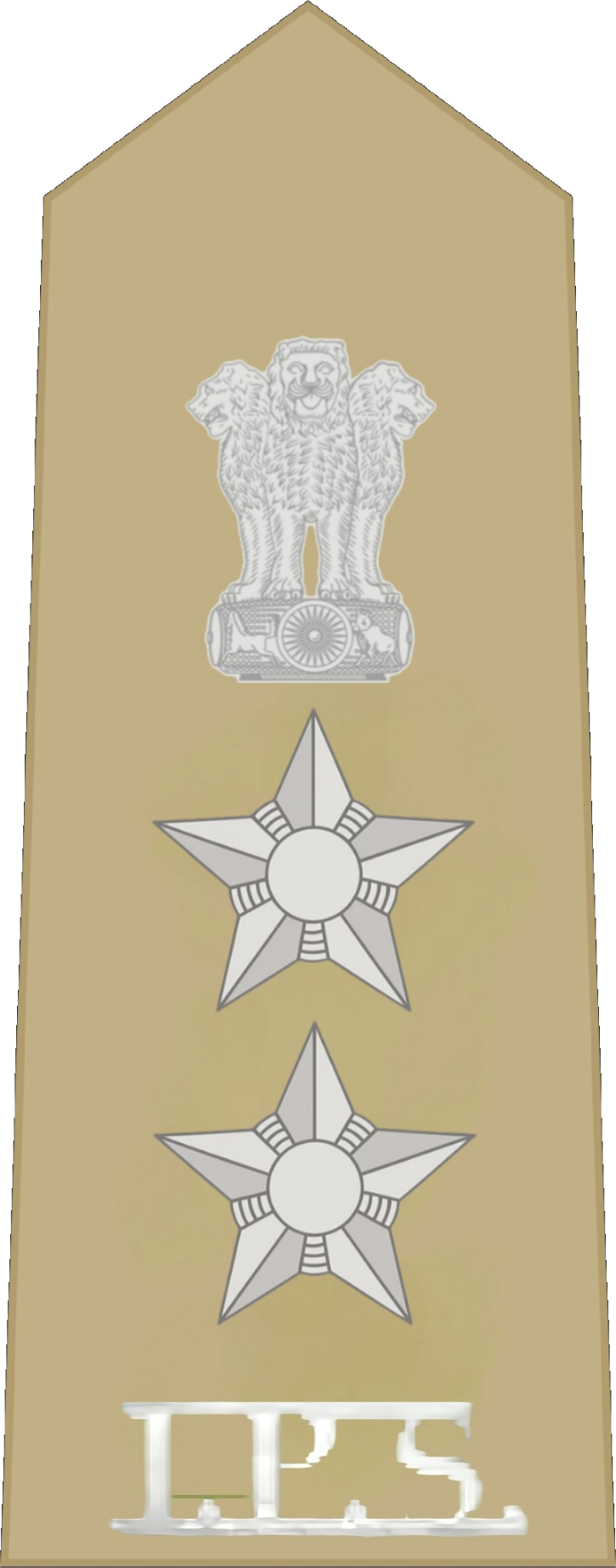
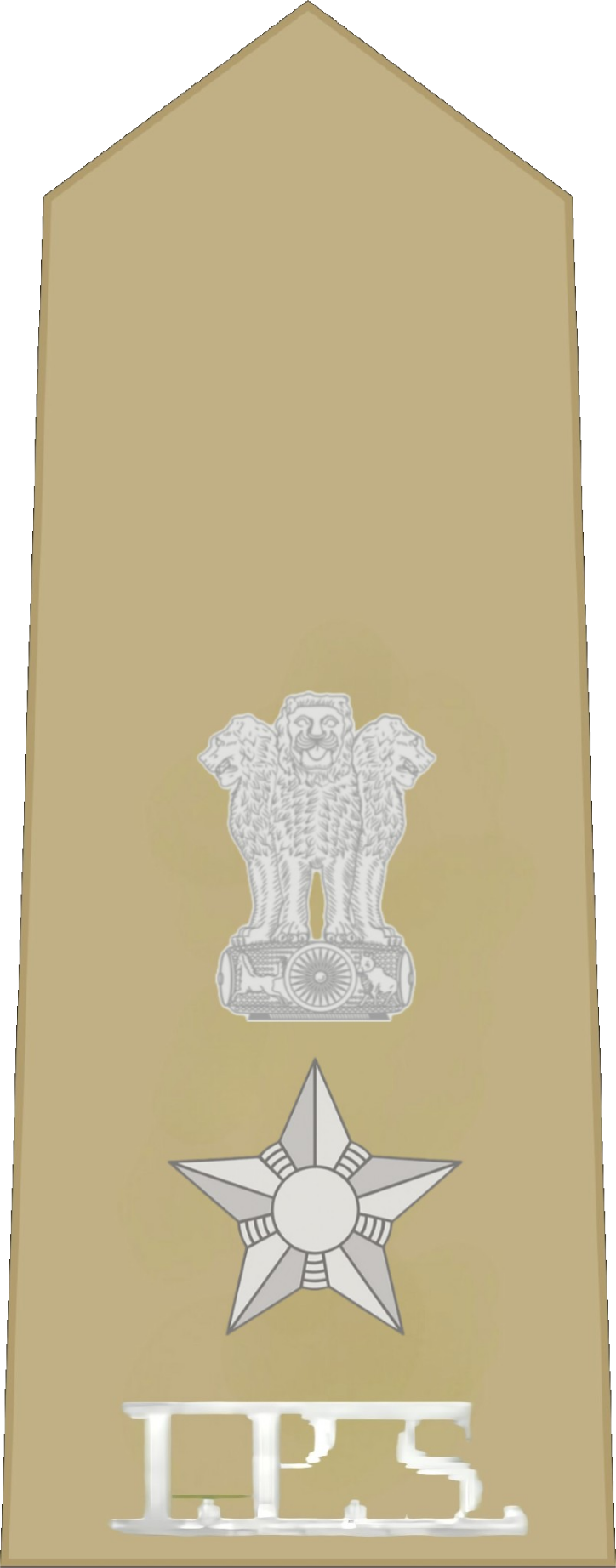
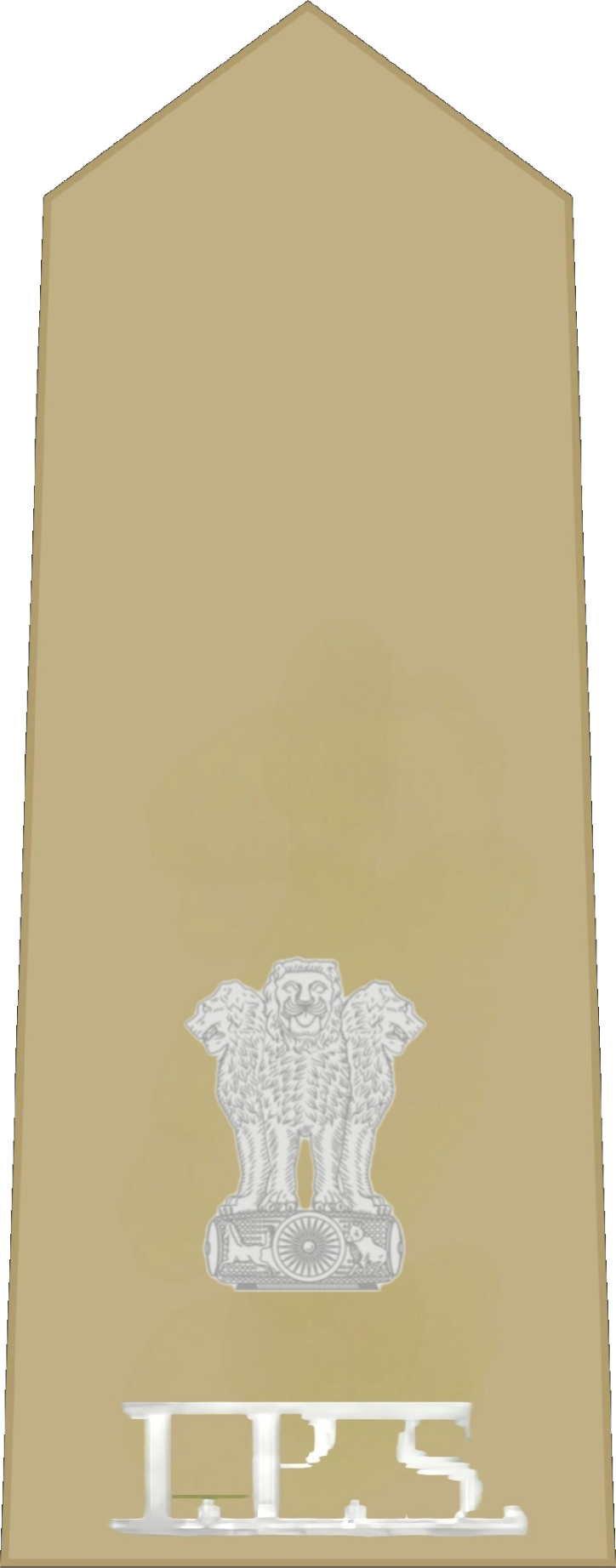
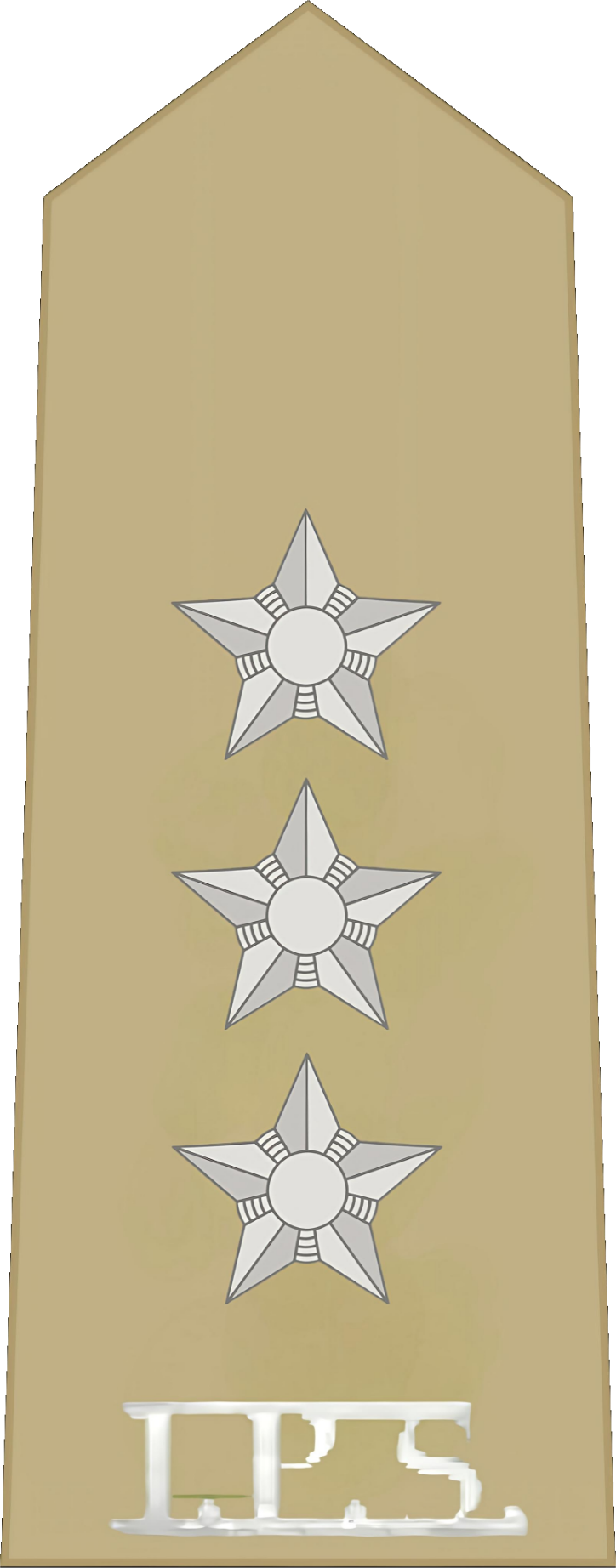
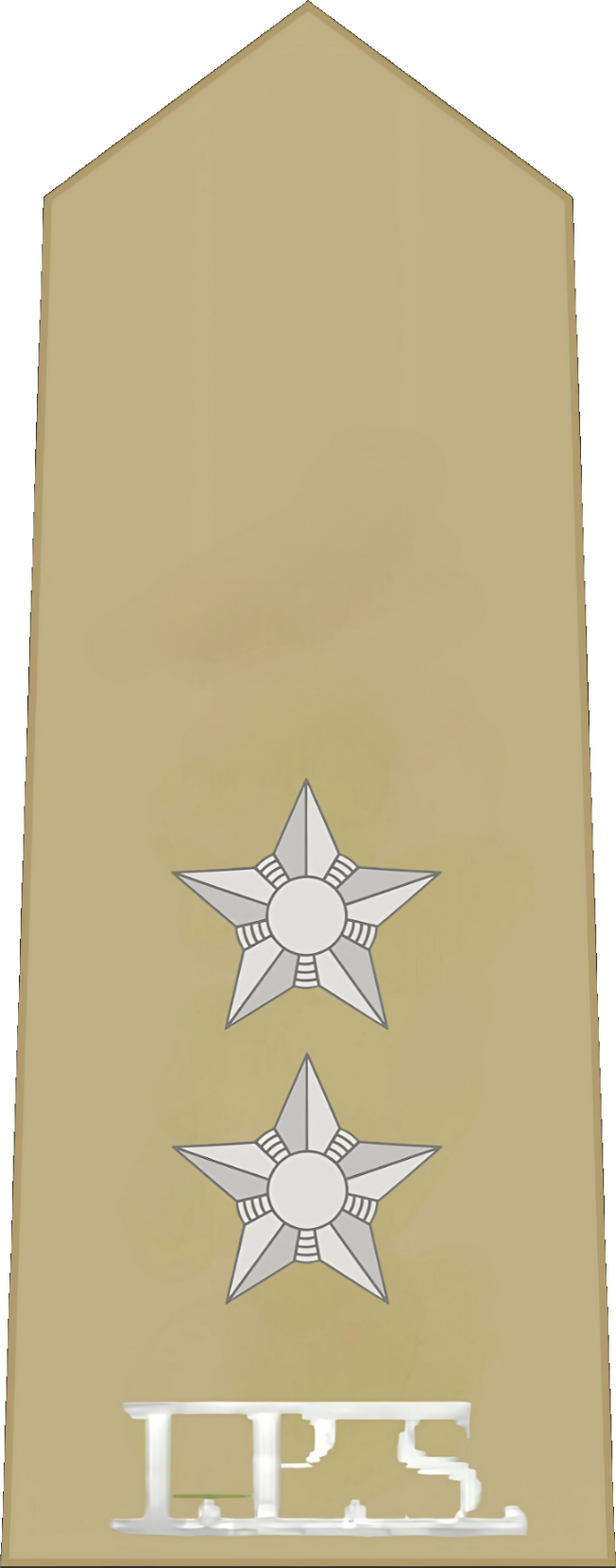
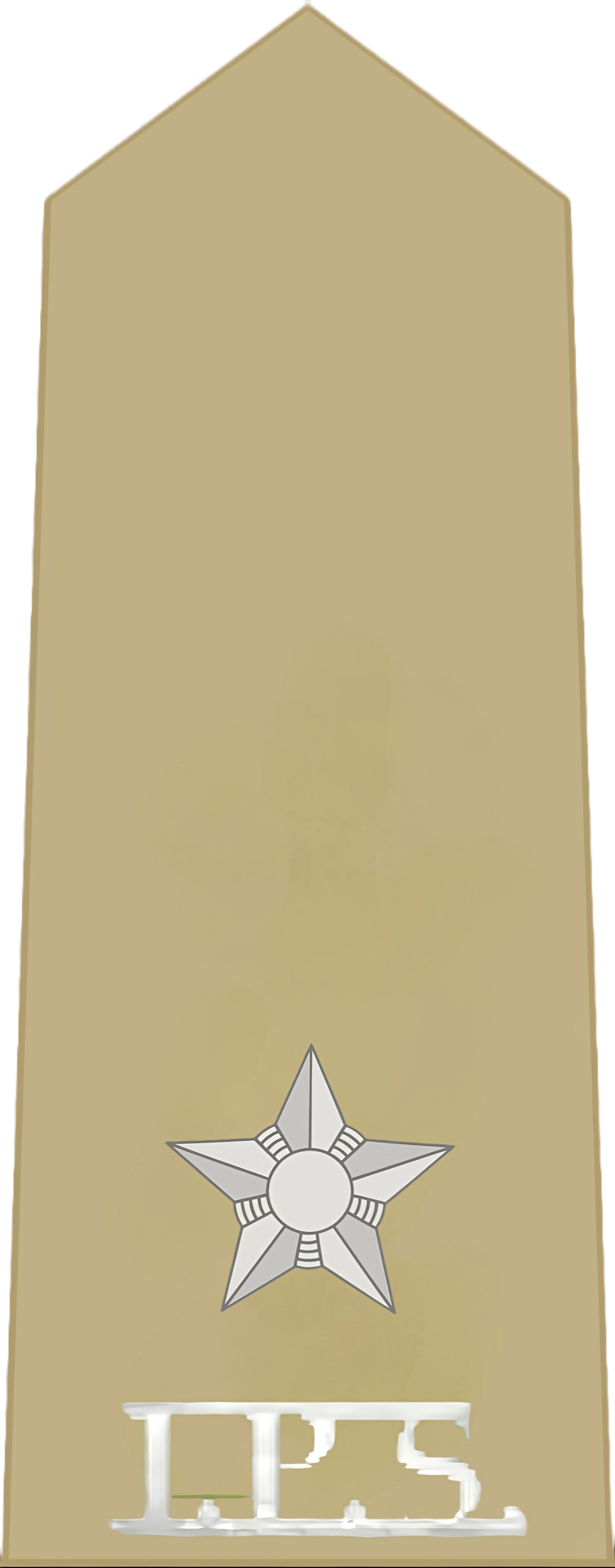
Rank
Director General of Police
Additional Director General of Police (Note: Rank insignia of DGP is similar to Additional DGP.)
Inspector General of Police
Deputy Inspector General of Police
Superintendent of Police (Selection Grade) (Note: The Senior Superintendent of Police (SSP) is a post, not a rank, typically held by an SP (selection grade or junior grade) in states like Uttar Pradesh, Jammu and Kashmir, and Punjab.)
Superintendent of Police
Additional superintendent of police
Assistant Superintendent of Police
Assistant superintendent of police (Probationary for two years)
Assistant Superintendent of Police (Probationary for one year)
Abbreviation
DGP
ADGP
IGP
DIGP
SP (SG)
SP
Addl.SP
ASP
ASP
ASP

- Note 1: The rank insignia of DGP, Spl.DGP, Addl.DGP is the same.
- Note 2: The equivalent rank to the ASP (Asst.SP) in State Police Services is the deputy superintendent of police (DSP/DySP).
- Note 3: The commissioner of police is a post typically held by DIG and above rank officers.

Karnataka State Police officers insignia
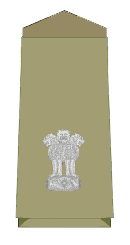
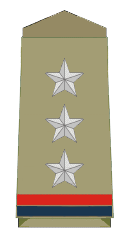
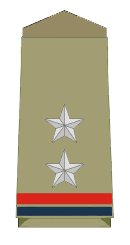
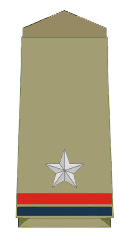
Gazetted officers
Insignia
Rank	Superintendent of Police (KSPS)	Additional Superintendent of Police (KSPS)	Deputy Superintendent of Police (KSPS)	Deputy Superintendent of Police (KSPS - probationary for two years)	Deputy Superintendent of Police (KSPS - probationary for one year)	Police Inspector and Circle Inspector
Abbreviation	SP	Addl.SP	DySP	DySP	DySP	PI and CI
Non-gazetted officers
Insignia				No insignia
Rank	Sub Inspector of Police	Assistant Sub Inspector (and 2 years probationary Sub Inspector)	Head constable	Police constable
Abbreviation	PSI/SI	ASI and probationary PSI	HC	PC

== Law and Order ==
This wing is headed by an officer with the rank of Additional Director General of Police, Law and Order.

The Law & Order Wing consists of seven police ranges, headed by Inspectors General of Police (IGPs). Each range consists two or more police districts, headed by Superintendents of Police (SPs). These police districts are the main functional units; responsible for overall policing, including crime prevention, crime detection, and maintenance of law and order in the respective districts.

== State Intelligence Department ==
The Intelligence Department is headed by an Additional Director General of Police, assisted by two Deputy Inspector General of Police and five Superintendents of Police at headquarters. The five Superintendents of Police in the Intelligence Divisions are in Bangalore, Mysore, Mangalore, Gulbarga, Belagavi, Davanagere and Ballari.

== Crime and Technical Services Wing ==
This wing is headed by the Additional Director General of Police, Crime and Technical Services. It includes the Fingerprint Bureau, Forensic Scientific Laboratory, Police Computer Wing and State Crime Record Bureau.

== Reserve police ==
In the state, the police trace their origins to the former Mysore State Imperial Service. They consist of:

- A District Armed Reserve (DAR) for each district
- A City Armed Reserve (CAR) in Bangalore, Mysore, Mangalore, Belagavi and Hubli-Dharwad
- A Special Task Force (STF)
- The Karnataka Armed Reserve Mounted Police, headquartered in Mysore
- Coastal Security Police (CSP)
- Government Railway Police (GRP)

The Karnataka State Reserve Police (KSRP) is headed by an Additional Director General of Police, assisted by an Inspector General and one Deputy Inspectors General of Police at headquarters. The Karnataka State Reserve Police consists of 12 battalions: four in Bengaluru and one each in Mysuru, Belagavi, Kalaburagi, Mangaluru, Shivamogga, Shiggaon, Hassana and Tumakuru 2 IRB battalions are situated in Munirabad (Koppala) and Vijayapura. Indian Reserve Battalion (IRB) is a specially formed reserved force. They are well trained striking force.

== Mounted police ==
In 1951 the horses in the maharaja's bodyguard were used for the Karnataka Armed Reserve Mounted Police, headquartered in Mysuru. The stables, fields and office buildings date to the maharajas' time. Mounted police are used for traffic duty, night patrol, officer training and the Mysuru Dasara. The force is made up of 90 horses and 150 officers and men.

Mounted-police riders still practice tent pegging, and are also known for games, ceremonial parades and showmanship. Its riders have won a number of prizes in national and international equestrian competitions. The mounted police is headed by S. G. Mariba Shetti, who has won gold medals at the 1995 World Police Games in Australia (1995) and in 2001 in Indianapolis (2001) and has commanded the Dasara procession since 1977.

In January 2024 The Hindu reported that mounted police patrols were being reintroduced around Cubbon Park and the Vidhana Soudha, the seat of the state legislature in Bengarluru.

== Coastal Security Police ==
The Coastal Security Police (CSP) was established in 1999, and is headed by the Superintendent of Police. It has jurisdiction over Karnataka's coastal waters along the Arabian sea from Talapady in Dakshina Kannada to Majali in Uttara Kannada; a coastline of about 320 kilometres (200 mi). Its range extends 12 nautical miles out to sea and 500 metres inland. The CSP comes under the Internal Security Division headed by Additional director general of police in Richmond Road, Bengaluru. As of January 2021, nine coastal police stations had been established and 13 "interceptor boats" were in operation.

== Forest Cell ==
The Forest Cell assists the Karnataka Forest Department with their operations.

== Policing excess and errors ==
Karnataka High Court ordered a departmental inquiry against policemen for filing false chargesheet under NDPS Act affecting careers and future of students. In another instance, Kerala Police arrested Karnataka police officers who took money from crypto traders. The Karnataka Police fired openly during the 2008 Haveri police shooting causing two deaths, resulting in a judicial probe ordered.

== Training ==
This wing is headed by the Director General of Police, Training, assisted by an Inspector General of Police (Training) and Deputy Inspector General of Police (Training). Karnataka has many training institutions:

- Karnataka Police Academy, Mysuru
- Police Training College, Naganahalli, Kalaburagi
- Karnataka State Police Training School, Channapattana
- Karnataka Police Training school, Khanapura, Belagavi
- Armed Police Training School, Yalahanka, Bengaluru
- Police Training School, Aimangala, Chitradurga
- Police training School, Thanisandra, Bengaluru
- Police Training School, Kaduru, Chilkkamagaluru
- Police Training School, Dharwad
- Police Training School, Jyothi Nagara, Mysuru
- Temporary Police Training School, Navangar, Bagalkot
- Police Training School, Munirabad, Koppala
- Police Training School, Kangralli, Belagavi
- Police Training School, Vijayapura
- CCT Training Center, Kudlu, Bengaluru
- CCT Training Center, Agara, Bengaluru
- ANF Training Center, Karkala, Udupi
- Traffic Training Institute, RK Hegade Nagara, Bengaluru
- Special Branch Training Institute, Bengaluru
- Wireless Training Institute, Bengaluru
- Police Driving And Maintenance School, Yelahanka, Bengaluru

== Special units ==
State-level units perform specialized police functions and assist civil-police units:

- Criminal Investigation Department (CID), Economic Offenses and Special Units: Headed by a Director General of Police, the unit oversees the Corps of Detectives, the Forest Cell, the Economic Offenses Unit and the Cyber Police Station.
- Directorate of Civil-Rights Enforcement: Headed by an Additional Director General of Police, Civil Rights Enforcement, and assisted by an Inspector General of Police, a Deputy Inspector General of Police and a Superintendent of Police at headquarters. the wing has six field units (each headed by a Superintendent of Police) at the police ranges in Bengaluru, Mangaluru, Davanagere, Belagavi, Kalaburagi and Mysuru. The directorate monitors and investigates cases registered under the Protection of Civil Rights Act 1955 and the Prevention of Atrocities Act, and is the watchdog of rights and benefits extended to the Scheduled Castes and Scheduled Tribes.
- Communication, Logistic and Modernization Wing: Headed by an Additional Director General of Police, the wing consists of a Police Wireless Unit and a Motor Transport Organisation (both headed by a Superintendent of Police).
- Planning & Modernization: Headed by an Inspector General of police, Planning and Modernization, the wing receives consolidation proposals for the police department and submits them to the government for approval.
- Police Housing & Welfare: Headed by an Inspector General of Police, Grievance Cell and Human Rights
- Internal Security Division: Headed by an Additional Director General of Police, the unit oversees the Terrorism and Naxalist in Karnataka State, Karnataka State Industrial Security Force (KSISF), Cyber cell, Forensic cell, and Bomb Detection Squad specially designed force called "Garuda Force" and ANF (Anti Naxal Force) units in it.

== See also ==
- Karnataka Fire and Emergency Services
- Bangalore City Police
- Law enforcement in India
