= Bengaluru City Police =

Law-enforcement agency of Bengaluru, India

Bengaluru City Police Beṅgaḷūru Nagara Polīs
- Logo of the Bengaluru City Police
- Abbreviation: BCP
- Motto: Care · Compassion · Courage

Agency overview
- Formed: 1 July 1963
- Legal personality: Bengaluru, Karnataka

Jurisdictional structure
- Federal agency: India
- Operations jurisdiction: Bengaluru, Karnataka, India
- Area: 712 km^{2}
- Population: 8,728,906 (2011 census)
- Primary governing body: Karnataka Police
- Secondary governing body: Government of Karnataka
- Constituting instrument: Police Act, 1861
- General nature: Federal law enforcement; Local civilian police

Operational structure
- Headquarters: Commissioner of Police, 2 Ali Askar Road, Vasanth Nagar, Bengaluru 560001
- Minister responsible: Priyank Kharge, Karnataka Minister of Home Affairs (excluding Intelligence)
- Agency executive: Seemanth Kumar Singh, IPS, Commissioner of Police
- Parent agency: Karnataka State Police
- Child agency: Bengaluru Traffic Police

Facilities
- Police stations: 187 (116 law-and-order, 53 traffic, 8 women, 9 CEN, 1 Central Crime Branch)

Website
- bcp.karnataka.gov.in/en

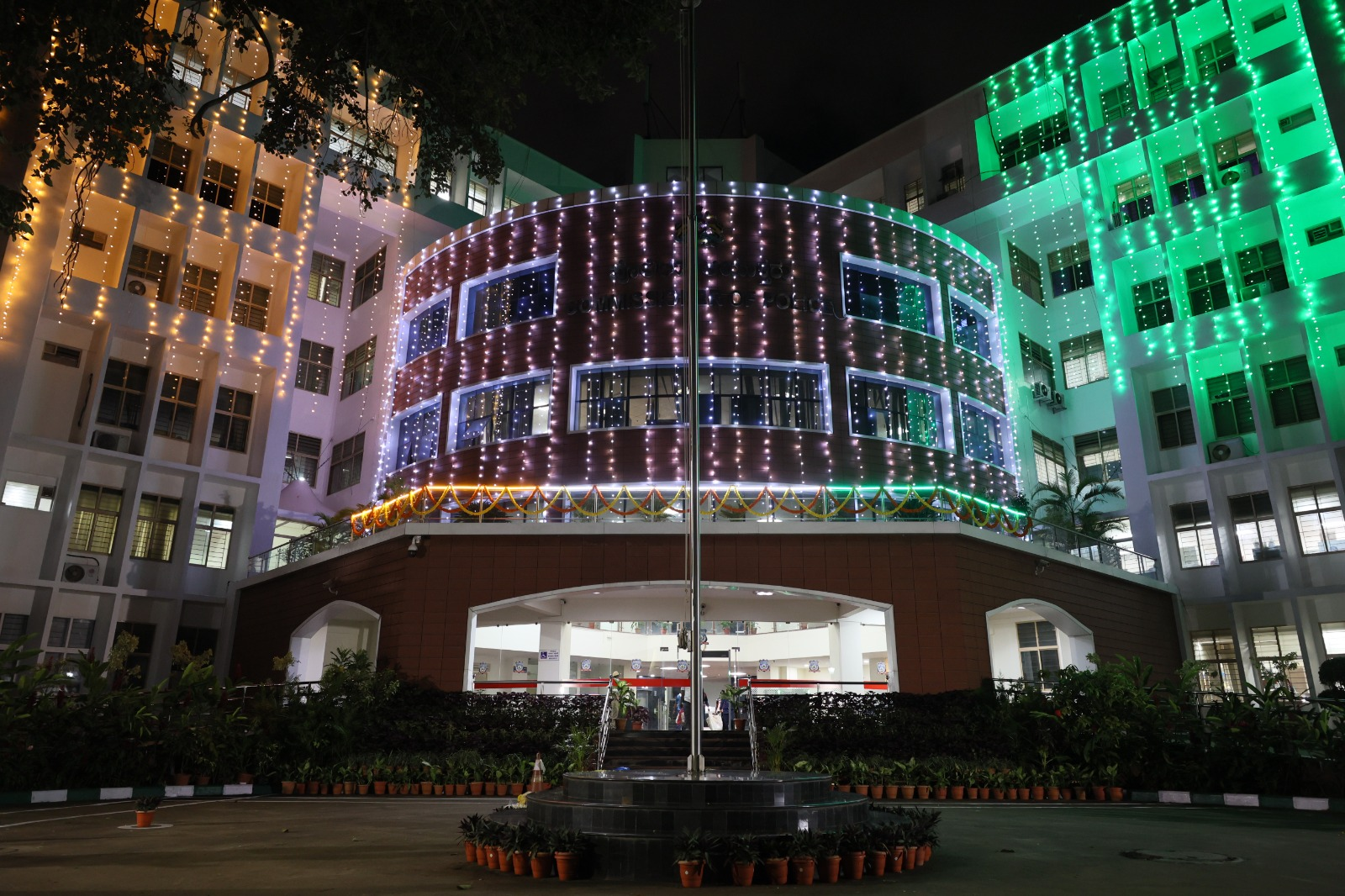
Commissioner of Police office, Bengaluru

Bengaluru City Police (BCP), also known as the Bangalore City Police, is the law enforcement agency for the city of Bengaluru, Karnataka, India. It functions under the administrative control of the Government of Karnataka and is headed by a Commissioner of Police, an Indian Police Service (IPS) officer of the rank of Additional Director General of Police. Seemanth Kumar Singh has held the post since 6 June 2025, having been appointed after his predecessor, B. Dayananda, was suspended following a fatal stampede at M. Chinnaswamy Stadium.

As of 2026, the force is organised into 11 law-and-order divisions and 4 traffic divisions, together covering 116 law-and-order police stations, 53 traffic police stations, 8 women police stations, 9 Cyber, Economic and Narcotics Crime (CEN) police stations, and the Central Crime Branch. In August 2026 the Karnataka government gave in-principle approval to a proposal splitting the single commissionerate into five smaller commissionerates aligned with the city's newly formed municipal corporations, a change that had not been implemented as of September 2026.

== History ==
Policing in Bengaluru originated in the administrative arrangements of the Kingdom of Mysore, where local officials and traditional watch systems handled law and order. Organised policing developed under British administration in the 19th century, and after India's independence in 1947 the city's police came under the Government of Karnataka.

The Bengaluru City Police was formally constituted on 1 July 1963 as the first city police force in Karnataka, with C. Chandy as its first Commissioner. The force subsequently expanded through the creation of additional divisions, police stations, and specialised wings, including units for cybercrime, narcotics, and crimes against women and children, in response to the city's growth as a technology hub.

== Organisational structure ==
The Commissioner of Police is assisted by Additional and Joint Commissioners of Police, who oversee law and order, crime, traffic, intelligence, and administration. Each of the 11 law-and-order divisions is headed by a Deputy Commissioner of Police (DCP) and subdivided into sub-divisions under an Assistant Commissioner of Police (ACP); individual police stations are commanded by a Police Inspector.

The number of law-and-order divisions was raised from eight to 11 in 2024, when the state government approved three additional divisions — North West, South West, and Electronics City — alongside the existing Central, East, West, South, South East, North, North East, and Whitefield divisions.

=== Police stations by type ===
Type of police station	Number
Law-and-order	116
Traffic	53
Women's	8
CEN (Cyber, Economic and Narcotics Crime)	9
Central Crime Branch	1
Total	187

=== Ranks and Insignia ===
Gazetted officers

Senior gazetted officers of the Bengaluru City Police
Post/designation	Abbreviation	Typical rank	Insignia
Commissioner of Police	CP	ADGP	
Additional Commissioner of Police	Addl. CP	IGP	
Joint Commissioner of Police	Jt. CP	DIG	
Deputy Commissioner of Police	DCP	Sr.SP or SP	
Assistant Commissioner of Police	ACP	DySP / Asst. SP	
The posts listed above are commissionerate designations; the rank attached to a particular post may vary according to the sanctioned post and the officer's cadre.; The Commissioner of Police (CP) is the head of the Bengaluru City Police.

== Specialised units ==
The Bengaluru City Police maintains specialised units alongside its territorial police stations, including:

- The Central Crime Branch (CCB), which investigates organised crime, financial fraud, and other cases beyond the capacity of individual stations.
- Scene of Crime Officers (SOCO), a forensic unit responsible for evidence collection and crime-scene documentation.
- The City Crime Records Branch (CCRB), which compiles and analyses citywide crime statistics.
- The Central Armed Reserve (CAR), deployed for crowd control and additional manpower during large public events.
- An Intelligence Unit responsible for internal-security monitoring and threat assessment.
- Women's police stations, established to handle crimes against women.
- A K9 Unit and a Mounted Patrol for tracking, detection, and crowd-management duties.
- An Anti-Terrorist Cell that coordinates with state and national intelligence agencies.

== Traffic management ==
The Bengaluru Traffic Police (BTP) is organised into four divisions — East, West, North, and South — overseeing the 53 traffic police stations. Enforcement relies on an Intelligent Traffic Management System (ITMS), including Automatic Number Plate Recognition (ANPR) and Adaptive Traffic Signal Control (ATCS) cameras, alongside the ASTrAM mobile application for public traffic advisories.

Fine collection through automated enforcement rose sharply in 2025, with the BTP collecting a record ₹251.26 crore in traffic fines that year — nearly four times the ₹62.82 crore collected in 2024 — driven in part by two temporary 50 per cent rebate windows on pending challans.

== Technology and surveillance ==
Under the Safe City Project, the BCP has deployed a network of CCTV cameras across arterial roads and public locations, coordinated through a centralised Command Centre and Control Room. The project has drawn international attention, including a visit by Dubai Police officials to study Bengaluru's Safe City infrastructure.

AI-assisted heatmapping and CCTV analytics have been used for crowd management during New Year's Eve celebrations. For New Year 2026, the force deployed 78 watchtowers across the city and extended Metro and BMTC services to manage crowd movement, with police personnel stationed on trains and buses until 3 a.m.

== Emergency services ==
Emergency response is coordinated through the national 112 helpline (Emergency Response Support System), which dispatches police, fire, and ambulance services and has been used to rescue individuals in medical distress.

Women's safety is additionally supported through Safety Island, a network of 50 SOS-enabled kiosks installed at high-footfall locations under the Safe City Project; each kiosk connects directly to the police control room and is fitted with cameras and two-way audio. Some locations, such as Banashankari, have recorded disproportionately high SOS usage. The Karnataka State Police mobile application (KSP App) provides linked SOS alerts, online complaint filing, and a "Safe Connect" feature that over 150 citizens had used to seek help as of early 2026.

Cyber and financial fraud is handled through the national 1930 helpline. Additional dedicated helplines operate under the PARIHAR initiative: Vanitha Sahayavani (1091) for women, the Elders Helpline (1090), and the Child Helpline (1098), operated by CHILDLINE India Foundation. The Neravu project, under the Nirbhaya Scheme and the Safe City Project, installed 60 portable emergency assistance cabins across the city, primarily for women in distress.

== Crime prevention and public safety ==
Preventive policing includes beat patrols, area domination exercises, and community-engagement programmes such as Mane Manege Police (police outreach at the neighbourhood level) and Friends of Police, a volunteer initiative supporting local crime prevention. During New Year celebrations the force typically deploys around 20,000 personnel citywide as part of coordinated public-safety operations.

== 2026 proposal to split the commissionerate ==
In a letter dated 1 August 2026 to the Director General and Inspector General of Police, Commissioner Seemant Kumar Singh proposed dividing the single Bengaluru commissionerate — then covering 712 km^{2} with a sanctioned strength of 26,296 personnel — into five separate commissionerates (Central, East, West, North, and South), extending jurisdiction into parts of Bengaluru Rural and Ramanagara districts and upgrading the top post to Chief Police Commissioner. The plan called for 6,633 additional posts at an estimated cost of ₹764.87 crore. The Karnataka cabinet subsequently granted in-principle approval to the proposal.

Chief Minister D. K. Shivakumar publicly confirmed the restructuring during his Independence Day address on 15 August 2026, describing it as part of a broader decentralisation effort that also created the Greater Bengaluru Authority and five municipal corporations to replace the Bruhat Bengaluru Mahanagara Palike. He said the city's policing infrastructure, originally designed for a population of around 1 million, was no longer adequate, and announced a related plan to form a dedicated Anti-Rowdy Squad.

The proposal drew criticism from IPS officers, some of whom characterised it as an attempt by the state administrative service to reduce the influence of the police service, and from the opposition BJP, which cited an estimated cost of ₹75,000 crore. Serving and retired officers gave mixed assessments in follow-up reporting: some argued that smaller commissionerates would allow more localised command and control, while others warned of added administrative layers, unresolved resource gaps, and risks to coordination during large-scale events. As of September 2026, no formal notification implementing the split, appointing new commissioners, or defining jurisdictional boundaries had been issued; the proposal remained approved in principle but not yet in effect.

== Awards and recognition ==
In 2016–17, the Bengaluru City Police received the Innovative Use of GIS Technology award for its social-media and Namma-100 Command Centre initiative, and the Innovative Use of Mobile Technology award for its e-Lost & Found Report application.

In 2025, the force received the BluGreen Awards 2025 Certificate of Recognition under the Solid Waste sector for its contribution to environmental sustainability. It also placed third in the State Government institutions category at both the 217th Republic Day Flower Show (2025) and the 218th Independence Day Flower Show (2025) at Lalbagh, Bengaluru.

== Leadership ==
The Commissioner of Police is the chief executive authority of the Bengaluru City Police Commissionerate, responsible for law enforcement, crime prevention, traffic management, and public safety within the city. The Commissioner reports through the Home Department of the Government of Karnataka, currently headed by Home Minister Priyank Kharge under Chief Minister D. K. Shivakumar, who took office on 3 June 2026 following a change of leadership within the state's ruling Congress party; his cabinet reassigned the Revenue and Sports portfolios to Deputy Chief Minister G. Parameshwara, who had previously held the Home portfolio.

=== List of Commissioners of Police ===
No.	Name	Tenure
1	C. Chandy, IPS	1 July 1963 – 19 April 1966
2	Kadhar Ali, IPS	20 April 1966 – 31 October 1968
3	H. Veerabhadraiah, IPS	31 October 1968 – 1 June 1972
4	K. G. Ramanna, IPS	2 June 1972 – 19 September 1973
5	M. L. Chandrashekar, IPS	20 September 1973 – 1 June 1976
6	T. Albert Manoraj, IPS	2 June 1976 – 31 October 1976
7	B. N. Garudachar, IPS	31 October 1976 – 30 December 1980
8	A. R. Nizamuddin, IPS	31 December 1980 – 2 March 1983
9	P. G. Harlankar, IPS	2 March 1983 – 8 December 1986
10	K. U. Balakrishna Rao, IPS	8 December 1986 – 31 October 1987
11	A. R. Sridharan, IPS	31 October 1987 – 1 December 1988
12	S. N. S. Murthy, IPS	1 December 1988 – 5 June 1989
13	Ramaligam, IPS	5 June 1989 – 31 July 1992
14	Chandulal, IPS	31 July 1992 – 15 September 1993
15	P. Kodanda Ramaiah, IPS	15 September 1993 – 21 December 1994
16	T. Srinivasalu, IPS	21 December 1994 – 13 June 1996
17	S. C. Burman, IPS	13 June 1996 – 2 April 1997
18	L. Revanasiddiah, IPS	14 April 1997 – 18 November 1999
19	T. Madiyal, IPS	19 November 1999 – 31 October 2001
20	H. T. Sangliana, IPS	31 October 2001 – 21 October 2002
21	M. D. Singh, IPS	21 October 2002 – 2 May 2003
22	Mariswami, IPS	2 May 2003 – 8 June 2005
23	Ajay Kumar Singh, IPS	8 June 2005 – 21 June 2006
24	Achyut Rao, IPS	21 June 2006 – 11 July 2008
25	Shankar Bidari, IPS	11 July 2008 – 2 May 2011
26	B. G. Jyothi Prakash Mirji, IPS	2 May 2011 – 5 April 2013
27	Ragavendra H. Auradkar, IPS	5 April 2013 – 20 May 2013
28	B. G. Jyothi Prakash Mirji, IPS	20 May 2013 – 30 June 2013
29	Ragavendra H. Auradkar, IPS	30 June 2013 – 21 July 2014
30	M. N. Reddy, IPS	21 July 2014 – 31 July 2015
31	N. S. Megharikh, IPS	31 July 2015 – 31 December 2016
32	Praveen Sood, IPS	1 January 2017 – 31 July 2017
33	T. Suneel Kumar, IPS	31 July 2017 – 17 June 2019
34	Alok Kumar, IPS	17 June 2019 – 2 August 2019
35	Bhaskar Rao, IPS	2 August 2019 – 1 August 2020
36	Kamal Pant, IPS	1 August 2020 – 17 May 2022
37	Pratap Reddy, IPS	17 May 2022 – 30 May 2023
38	B. Dayananda, IPS	30 May 2023 – 5 June 2025
39	Seemanth Kumar Singh, IPS	6 June 2025 – present

== See also ==
- Karnataka Police
- Greater Bengaluru Authority
- Commissioner of the Bengaluru City Police
